= Lewis Greer Zirkle Jr. =

Orthopaedic Surgeon and Philanthropist

Lewis Greer Zirkle Jr (born July 23, 1940) is a board-certified orthopaedic surgeon known for developing surgical implants and curriculum for fracture care in low- and middle-income countries, or LMICs. Born in Pittsfield, Massachusetts, Zirkle attended Davidson College and Duke University School of Medicine. During his time in Medical School, he was drafted into the United States Army and served as an orthopaedic surgeon during the Vietnam War.

On January 29, 1999, Zirkle founded SIGN Fracture Care International (SIGN), a 501(c)(3) non- profit organization, aimed at aiding orthopaedic surgeons and patients in LMICs. Between 1972 and 2019, he traveled to 35 countries to teach surgery and orthopaedic care. In 2018 he was awarded the Department of Defense Medal for Distinguished Public Service for his work with the injured poor.

== Biography ==
=== Early life ===
Zirkle was born in Pittsfield, Massachusetts, USA on July 23, 1940. He was the second son born to Lewis Zirkle Sr. and Vivian Shaw Zirkle. Zirkle grew up in North Carolina where his father was employed by General Electric. He attended Newton-Conover High School in Newton, North Carolina where he played football. As a teenager during the summers, Zirkle worked at a lumber mill stacking lumber, and later on wanted to become a carpenter.

Zirkle met his late wife Sara Kay Shilling while attending medical school. Sara was a year ahead of him and specialized in pediatric care, with a subspecialty in developmental behavior. They married in 1963 and had three daughters and nine grandchildren. Sara died on June 19, 2022.

=== Education ===
Zirkle initially considered a career as a professional carpenter but chose to pursue higher education instead. He attended Davidson College on a football scholarship, where he began taking pre-med classes. Zirkle was accepted to Duke University Medical Center in Durham, North Carolina, as a medical student.

Dr. Lenox Baker became a mentor to Zirkle after his first year at Duke. In his third year of medical school, Zirkle was invited to join the Duke Orthopaedic program as a resident allowing him to treat patients and assist in surgeries. Zirkle was able to skip the second year of general surgery after the first year, due to Dr. Baker accepting him into the orthopaedic surgery specialization early.

Due to Zirkle's involvement with the Army, he was not given an official certification of completion for Orthopaedic Training from Duke Orthopaedics until 2024.

=== Military Service & Residency ===
Zirkle was prepared to start his surgical training when he was drafted into the Army in 1968. Due to his early acceptance into orthopaedic training, he was designated as an orthopaedic surgeon in the Army rather than a general medical officer, having completed one year of orthopaedic training.

His military service included time treating military officials and civilian patients at the 93rd Evac Hospital in the Republic of Vietnam between 1968-1969 and at Fitzsimmons General Hospital in the United States between 1969-1970. Zirkle continued his orthopaedic residency while in the service at Letterman General Hospital between April 1970 to January 1971, Shriner's Hospital for Crippled Children between January 1971 to January 1972, and Fort Ord between January 1972 to April 1973. During his annual leave at Fort Ord in 1972, Zirkle and his wife Sara participated in a volunteer effort with CARE MEDICO in Indonesia, a program established by Dr. Tom Dooley. This initial volunteer experience inspired Zirkle to continue returning to Indonesia for many years following his leave from the military to heal patients and train doctors and medical students.

=== Orthopedic career ===
Between 1973 and 2015, Zirkle worked in private orthopaedic practice until he retired in 2008 to focus on SIGN Fracture Care. In 1976, he helped build The Northwest Orthopaedic and Sports Medicine practice, that has since become a division of Kadlec Clinic.

Throughout his career, Zirkle used his vacation time to travel to low-and middle-income countries (LMICs) such as Indonesia and Vietnam, where he established a rapport with the local physicians. During one of his visits to Indonesia, he found that the supplies being donated to the hospital were not suitable to aid in the fracture care that was needed. He then devised a plan to provide medical supplies and tools to orthopaedic surgeons in these LMICs, enabling them to treat fracture patients without relying on traction.

=== Medical legacy ===
Zirkle's contributions to orthopaedics in LMICs include creating medical instruments, such as target arms and slot finders, to replace the need for a C-arm in an operating room, as well as implants like intramedullary nails, plates, and screws for treating tibia, femur, and humerus fractures. His establishment of SIGN Fracture Care has facilitated the training and education of surgeons in LMICs on the SIGN Technique. Over the course of 25 years, Zirkle has trained over 5,000 surgeons and has helped to heal patients in more than 50 different LMICs. This initiative was developed to improve the healing process of fractured bones, aiming for optimal functional outcomes with minimal healing time and little to no financial burden on patients or their families.

==== SIGN Implants ====
The SIGN Nail is an intramedullary nail that is held in place by interlocking screws to stabilize a fractured bone and enable bone healing. The SIGN Fin Nail does not require interlocking screws at the distal end, which makes surgery simpler and faster. The SIGN Pediatric Nail uses fins from the Fin Nail and is scaled to better fit in young patients. The interlock bypasses the growth plates, and the fins allow the implant to slide inside the bone canal, so it does not inhibit growth. These nails are used to treat fractures of the tibia, femur, and humerus.

==== SIGN Technique ====
The SIGN Technique involves using specifically designed intramedullary nails that can be inserted without the need for advanced medical imaging equipment. This technique helps provide effective and affordable fracture care where resources are limited.

== Published Works ==
- Mismatch of current intramedullary nails with the anterior bow of the femur (2004)
- Injuries in developing countries--How can we help? The role of orthopaedic surgeons (2008)
- Injuries: the neglected burden in developing countries (2009)
- The Role of SIGN in the Development of a Global Orthopaedic Trauma Database (2010)
- Low infection rates after 34,361 intramedullary nail operations in 55 low- and middle-income countries: validation of the Surgical Implant Generation Network (SIGN) online surgical database. (2011)
- Antimicrobial locked intramedullary fixation of long bone fractures: technology for the developing world (2012)
- Achieving locked intramedullary fixation of long bone fractures: technology for the developing world (2012)
- Risk factors for infection after 46,113 intramedullary nail operations in low- and middle-income countries (2013)
- Comparison of SIGN Pediatric and Fin nails in pediatric diaphyseal femur fractures: early clinical results (2015)
- The SIGN Nail: Factors in a Successful Device for Low-Resource Settings (2015)
- Management of Distal Tibial Metaphyseal Fractures With the SIGN Intramedullary Nail in 3 Developing Countries. (2015)
- Interlocked Intramedullary Nail Without Fluoroscopy (2016)
- Understanding and Addressing the Global Need for Orthopaedic Trauma Care (2016)
- State of Pelvic and Acetabular Surgery in the Developing World: A Global Survey of Orthopaedic Surgeons at Surgical Implant Generation Network (SIGN) Hospitals. (2017)
- Development of a Unifying Target and Consensus Indicators for Global Surgical Systems Strengthening: Proposed by the Global Alliance for Surgery, Obstetric, Trauma, and Anesthesia Care (The G4 Alliance). (2017)
- We Walk the World- A Journey of Healing (2017)
- Evaluation of Intramedullary Fixation for Pediatric Femoral Shaft Fractures in Developing Countries (2018)
- Consequences Following Distal Femoral Growth Plate Violation in an Ovine Model With an Intramedullary Implant: A Pilot Study. (2018)
- Clinical Outcomes and Complications of the Surgical Implant Generation Network (SIGN) Intramedullary Nail: A Systematic Review and Meta-Analysis. (2019)
- Risk Factors for Infection After Intramedullary Nailing of Open Tibial Shaft Fractures in Low- and Middle-Income Countries. (2019)
- Clinical and radiographic outcomes following retrograde SIGN fin nailing for femoral shaft fractures. (2020)
- Development of Squat-and-Smile Test as Proxy for Femoral Shaft Fracture-Healing in Patients in Dar es Salaam, Tanzania. (2021)
- Retrograde Intramedullary Nailing of Pediatric Femoral Shaft Fractures Does Not Result in Growth Arrest at the Distal Femoral Physis-A Retrospective Cases Series. (2021)
- Fixation of intertrochanteric femur fractures using the SIGN intramedullary nail augmented by a lateral plate in a resource-limited setting without intraoperative fluoroscopy: assessment of functional outcomes at one-year follow-up at Juba Teaching Hospital. (2021)
- The Influence of Retrograde Femoral Nail Removal With and Without Interpositional Fat Grafting on Distal Femoral Physeal Behavior: A Sheep Study. (2022)
- Rate of Tibiotalocalcaneal (TTC) Fusion Using the Surgical Implant Generation Network (SIGN) Intramedullary Nail in Developing Countries. (2023)
- Outcome of tibial shaft fractures treated with the SIGN FIN nail at Addis Ababa Emergency, Burn, and Trauma Hospital (AaEBT) Addis Ababa, Ethiopia. (2023)
- Predictors of nonunion for transverse femoral shaft fractures treated with intramedullary nailing: a SIGN database study. (2023)
- Intramedullary Fixation for Pediatric Femoral Nonunion in Low- and Middle-Income Countries. (2023)
- Delays in Debridement of Open Femoral and Tibial Fractures Increase Risk of Infection. (2023)

== Awards and honors ==
- Department of Defense Medal for Distinguished Public Service (2018)
- Duke Humanitarian Award (2001)
- Orthopaedic Trauma Association Lifetime Achievement Award (2022)
