= SIGN Fracture Care =

American non-profit orthopaedic manufacturer

- SIGN Fracture Care International
- Nickname: SIGN
- Founded: January 29, 1999; 27 years ago
- Founder: Dr Lewis G. Zirkle, Jr., president
- Type: Non-profit organization 501(c)(3)
- Tax ID no.: 91-1952283
- Purpose: Building orthopaedic capacity in LMIC by providing orthopaedic education and medical device design, manufacture, and donation of implants.
- Headquarters: Richland, Washington, U.S.
- Region served: Global
- Chief executive officer: Jeanne Dillner
- Budget: US$8,722,000 (2024)
- Revenue: US$6,205,211 (2024)
- Expenses: US$7,246,960 (2024)
- Staff: 39 (2024)
- Website: https://signfracturecare.org
- Remarks: Vision: To create equality of fracture care throughout the world.
- Formerly called: Surgical Implant Generation Network

SIGN Fracture Care International is a 501(c)(3) non-profit medical device manufacturing organization founded by Lewis Greer Zirkle Jr. Zirkle established SIGN after he patented a set of orthopaedic implants and instruments for use in low-resource hospitals. SIGN now manufactures and donates these instruments and implants to partner hospitals in low- and middle-income countries (LMIC). In addition to the distribution of orthopaedic products, SIGN provides surgical education to doctors operating in LMIC.

== History ==
In 1968 Zirkle was drafted into the United States Army to serve in the ongoing Vietnam War. While operating as a surgeon with the 93rd Evacuation Hospital, Zirkle treated wounded American and Vietnamese soldiers. Eventually, he began operating on Vietnamese civilians.

After returning from Vietnam, Zirkle rotated through several hospitals while finishing his Army contract. During this time, he sought more ways to treat injured people in LMIC. In 1972, Zirkle traveled to Indonesia to provide training for local orthopaedic surgeons. Along with traveling, he also brought donations of medical equipment to the Indonesian hospitals. It wasn't until 1996, when Zirkle encountered a patient who had been bed-ridden for three years due to a fractured femur, that he questioned the effectiveness of his travels. Zirkle questioned the Indonesian surgeon overseeing the patient as to why surgery had not been performed. The surgeon informed him that the patient could not afford an implant, nor were the supplied implants suitable for use. This interaction led Zirkle to realize another solution was needed to treat patients who live in LMIC.

Zirkle recognized that providing training for surgeons was inadequate without also supplying usable implants and instruments. To accomplish this goal, he needed to partner with a US-based surgical implant manufacturing company. After many rejections, Dr. Zirkle connected with Portland-based Acumed, Inc. Along with Acumed engineers, Zirkle created a preliminary set of intramedullary (IM) nails and instruments that Zirkle took to Vietnam. After receiving instruction in the SIGN system, the Vietnamese surgeons demonstrated their ability to use the nails.

SIGN officially launched on 29 January 1999. By September, Dr. Zirkle had set up a small shop in Richland, Washington with a manual lathe and a mill for metal working. Dr. Zirkle and Acumed founder Randall Huebner handcrafted two IM nails in Richland, which Huebner took to Acumed headquarters for mass production. By the end of 1999, the SIGN technique was piloted in four hospitals (two in Vietnam, one in Indonesia, and one in Nepal).

== Operations ==
=== Medical Device Manufacturing ===
SIGN's Pediatric Fin Nail uses the fin design, but is scaled to fit in the bones of younger patients and avoids using screws in growth centers of the bone, allowing the patient to grow during healing and avoiding long-term complications.

SIGN manufactures a system of orthopaedic instruments used to insert the nail and stabilize it with interlocking screws. This system does not rely on live-view C-arm x-ray systems in the operating room. Instead, SIGN's Target Arm and Slot Finder guide insertion of the nail and positions screws for stabilization.

SIGN is registered with the United States Food and Drug Administration (FDA). SIGN manufactures finished medical devices in compliance with the Code of Federal Regulations, FDA Quality Management System Regulation.

==== Patents ====
SIGN Instruments and Implants patented with the United States Patent and Trademarks Office include:

- SIGN Hip Construct (US-8157803-B1)
- SIGN Target Arm and Slot Finder (US-20020151897-A1, US-20040082955-A1, and US-7066943-B2)
- SIGN Bone Fixation System (US-10441317-B2)

=== Surgeon education ===
SIGN partners with surgeons based in LMIC by providing orthopaedic education opportunities. SIGN hosts an annual conference for international surgeons and partners with global orthopaedic partners to provide regional trainings.

==== SIGN Surgical Database ====
The SIGN Surgical Database is an online platform composed of patient information, pre-operative x-rays, and post-operative x-rays plus any comments the surgeon has about the case. Follow-up appointments are added to the case entry to track healing progress. Once a case is uploaded, experienced surgeons will review the procedure. The reviewers provide feedback to the surgeon, both on what they did well and any areas of improvement.

==== Annual SIGN International Orthopaedic Conference ====
The Annual SIGN International Orthopaedic Conference has been held in Richland nearly every year since 2001. During the COVID-19 pandemic, the in-person conference was canceled with leadership opting to instead use online training tools. The SIGN Conference began as a way for Dr. Zirkle to present SIGN's mission to US-based orthopaedic surgeons. In 2004, LMIC surgeons attended the SIGN Conference for the first time, representing Kenya and India. As the conference grew over time, the focus shifted from promotional to educational. Currently, the conference is attended by surgeons from low-resource countries who want to enhance their surgical skills.

== Activities by Location ==
As of January 2025, SIGN partners with more than 5,000 surgeons at 447 hospitals in 60 countries. Surgeons trained by SIGN have cared for more than 450,000 patients with fractures since 1999 .

=== Countries with active SIGN programs by region ===
Africa
Country	# of Programs	Active Since
Angola	1	2013
Benin	1	2021
Burkina Faso	1	2022
Burundi	8	2010
Cameroon	6	2007
Chad	4	2012
Dem. Rep. of the Congo	6	2012
Eswatini	1	2024
Ethiopia	50	2009
Gabonese Republic	1	2010
Ghana	6	2014
Guinea	2	2019
Kenya	19	2007
Lesotho	1	2022
Liberia	4	2007
Madagascar	1	2020
Malawi	6	2007
Mali	1	2016
Niger	2	2007
Nigeria	18	2007
Rwanda	5	2007
Sierra Leone	2	2009
Somalia	2	2021
Somaliland	4	2019
South Sudan	3	2012
Tanzania	38	2007
The Gambia	1	2017
Togo	1	2014
Uganda	9	2010
Zambia	2	2013
Zimbabwe	6	2012

Americas
Country	# of Programs	Active Since
Dominican Republic	4	2007
Ecuador	3	2007
Haiti	17	2007
Honduras	3	2016
Nicaragua	2	2007
Peru	2	2007
Saint Lucia	1	2007
Venezuela	1	2019

Asia
Country	# of Programs	Active Since
Afghanistan	21	2007
Armenia	3	2020
Bangladesh	8	2007
Bhutan	2	2007
Cambodia	17	2007
India	1	2007
Indonesia	3	2007
Iraq	2	2007
Lao PDR	4	2012
Mongolia	2	2008
Myanmar	16	2007
Nepal	10	2007
Pakistan	9	2007
The Philippines	10	2007
Vietnam	1	2007
Yemen	1	2021

Oceania
Country	# of Programs	Active Since
Palau	1	2024
Papua New Guinea	1	2018
Solomon Islands	1	2014

Europe
Country	# of Programs	Active Since
Bosnia and Hezegovina	1	2024
Ukraine	13	2022

== Awards and honors ==
- 2010: Smart Map Expo Manufacturer of the Year Award
- 2013: US Patents and Trademark Office Patents for Humanity Award, Medical—Diagnostics & Devices Category
- 2024: ESOT Institutional Award
