= Emerging Pathogens Institute =

University of Florida research center

Coordinates: 29.637187°N 82.352038°W

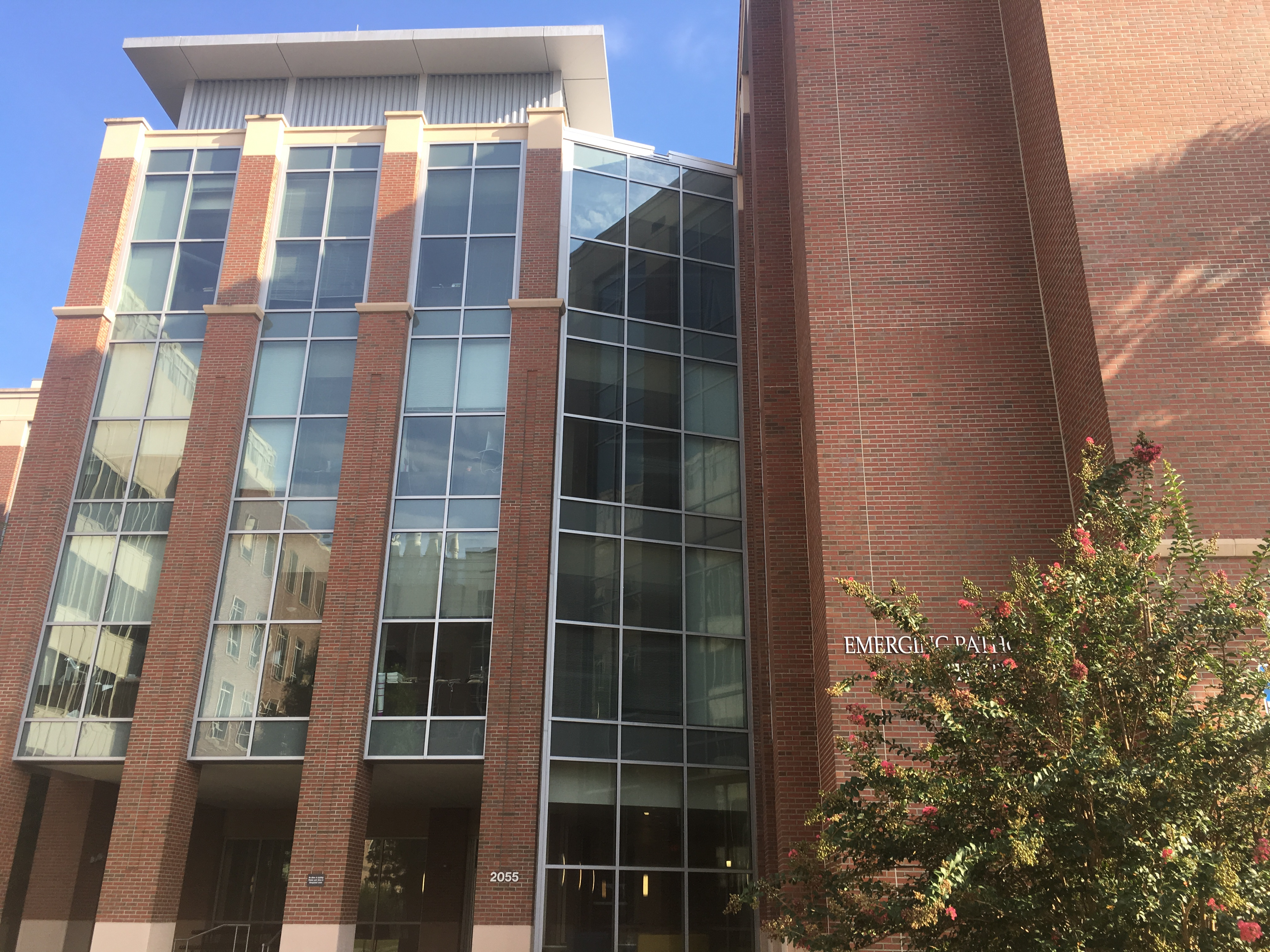
- The Emerging Pathogen Research Facility
- Established: 2007
- Director: J. Glenn Morris
- Location: Gainesville, Florida, USA
- Website: Official website

The Emerging Pathogens Institute (EPI) is an interdisciplinary research institution associated with the University of Florida. The institute focuses on fusing key disciplines to develop outreach, education, and research capabilities designed to preserve the region's health and economy, as well as to prevent or contain new and re-emerging diseases. Researchers within the institute work in more than 30 countries, with over 250 affiliated faculty members stemming from 11 University of Florida colleges, centers, and institutes. The 90,000-square-foot building includes laboratories and collaborative space for bioinformatics and mathematical modeling.

== History ==
The idea of this institute was first created by the University of Florida faculty and researchers, prompted by the recognition of a need for a facility that could drive pathogen-related research in FlorUida. Funding for the EPI was provided by the Florida State Legislature in 2006. In 2007, Dr. J. Glenn Morris was recruited from the University of Maryland, Baltimore to serve as the founding director of the EPI. Construction on a new, dedicated 90,000-square-foot research facility was completed in 2009. The structure houses the institute and numerous top researchers, as well as the Southeastern National Tuberculosis Center (SNTC), the Southern HIV and Alcohol Research Consortium (SHARC) and one of the CDC Centers of Excellence in Vector-borne Diseases.

In March 2009, the institute received a substantial grant from the Bill and Melinda Gates Foundation. This was the first time that the University of Florida has ever received direct funding from this foundation, and the grant was provided to help researchers develop tools to fight malaria.

== Major areas of research ==
- Vector-Borne Diseases
  - Zika, Dengue, Chikungunya, Malaria, Tick-borne diseases
- Viral respiratory pathogens
  - Coronavirus, Influenza
- Tuberculosis
  - Drug-resistant Tuberculosis
  - Non-Tuberculosis Mycobacterial Disease
- Enteric and Foodborne Illnesses
  - Cholera, diarrheal disease
  - Foodborne disease policy and control
- Plant Pathogens
- Antibiotic Resistance/Hospital Infection Control
  - MRSA
- HIV
- Zoonoses

== Global research ==
The Emerging Pathogens Institute channels multidisciplinary programs focused on plant, human and animal pathogens, including viral discovery, vector-borne pathogens and, most recently, coronaviruses and pandemic preparedness. Publications include papers in top scientific journals, including Science, Nature and Proceedings of the National Academy of Sciences. Given the speed with which pathogens can move globally, work in the EPI has had a strong international focus, with collaborations in place with investigators in over 50 countries.

EPI investigators have been involved in research on various coronavirus species for a number of years. With the onset of the pandemic, the EPI has played a role in population-based studies of COVID-19, including studies of transmission within schools. Other areas of research have included development of mathematical models predicting spread of the virus in Florida in successive pandemic waves, the critical role of aerosols in transmission of the virus and the transmission of coronaviruses of animal origin into humans.

== Directors ==
2007–Present J. Glenn Morris

== See also ==
- University of Florida
- Buildings at the University of Florida
- Infectious Disease Pharmacokinetics Laboratory
