= J. Glenn Morris =

American physician and epidemiologist

- Born: November 8, 1951 (age 74); Jackson, Mississippi
- Citizenship: United States
- Education: Tulane University (MD, MPH); Rice University (BA)
- Known for: Emerging infectious diseases
- Spouse: Deborah Morris
- Children: 3
- Scientific career
- Institutions: University of Florida; University of Maryland

John Glenn Morris Jr. (born November 8, 1951) is an American physician and epidemiologist. He is the founding director of the Emerging Pathogens Institute, an interdisciplinary research facility located within the University of Florida, having served between 2007 and 2024.

== Early life and education ==
=== Early life ===
Morris was born in Jackson, Mississippi, To John Glenn Morris Sr. (1918–2006) and Pauline Love Morris (1918–1999). John Glenn Morris Sr. was a theologian who received his Doctor of Philosophy from the Southern Baptist Theological Seminary in 1946, completing a dissertation entitled Christianity and social change in China, 1912–1942. Both of Morris' parents served as Christian missionaries in Bangkok, Thailand; John Glenn Morris Sr. taught Hebrew and Greek to Thai and Chinese and Pauline Love Morris worked with refugees. Morris moved to Thailand at the age of six weeks but periodically resided in the United States, specifically in Louisville, Kentucky and Kansas City, Missouri.

=== Education ===
Morris received his primary education from International School Bangkok, graduating in 1969. As an undergraduate, Morris attended Rice University and obtained Bachelors of Arts in both medieval Chinese history and biology in 1973. Morris then received a Doctor of Medicine and Master of Public Health & Tropical Medicine from Tulane University in 1977. During his medical training, Morris was appointed a Hawthorne Scholar, receiving full tuition for his studies, and was a member of the Alpha Omega Alpha Honor Medical Society. Morris went on to complete residency at affiliated hospitals of the University of Texas Southwestern Medical School. After, Morris participated in the Centers for Disease Control and Prevention's Epidemic Intelligence Service, a two-year postdoctoral training in field epidemiology. Upon his completion, he completed a residency at Emory University School of Medicine and infectious disease fellowship at the University of Maryland School of Medicine.

== Career ==
Following the completion of his infectious disease fellowship, Morris held clinical and academic appointments in the University of Maryland Medical System and University of Maryland School of Public Health, the latter of which he would serve as interim dean. While there, Morris played a role in investigating the human health effects of Pfiesteria, a dinoflagellate with a hypothesized negative effect on human learning and memory.

Concurrently, Morris served as an authority on molecular epidemiology and pathogenesis of emerging infectious diseases, particularly in the agricultural sector. Morris was appointed the Director of Epidemiology and Emergency Response Program, and later founded the Food Safety and Inspection Services Office of Public Health and Science, both within the United States Department of Agriculture (USDA); while at the USDA, he was instrumental in the development of FoodNet, a federal network for foodborne illness monitoring.

In 2007, he was appointed director of the Emerging Pathogens Institute, an interdisciplinary research facility located within the University of Florida; he has also maintained both clinical appointments at University of Florida Health and Veterans Administration Hospital, and academic appointments at the University of Florida College of Medicine. Morris has continued to advocate for issues of public health consequence such as federal food safety programs and responses to emerging pathogens like the Zika and Keystone viruses. More recently, he has been engaged in research on coronavirus transmission and the epidemiology of COVID-19. Alongside microbial pathogens, he has researched the human health effects of ciguatera fish poisoning and the Deepwater Horizon oil spill. He also currently serves as Director of the NIOSH Southeastern Coastal Center for Agricultural Health and Safety.

In addition to clinical and academic roles, Morris serves as an associate editor for the Centers for Disease Control and Prevention's Emerging Infectious Diseases journal. Previously, Morris served as the director of Intralytix, a private biotechnology firm that in part develops phage therapy.

=== Cholera ===
Morris' experience in the Epidemic Intelligence Service included the response to a series of cholera outbreaks in Rangsit, Thailand. Since the program's completion, Morris has published over eighty articles relating to the clinical and public health consequences of cholera and its causative agent, Vibrio cholerae. This has included studies in Bangladesh, Haiti and Goma in the Democratic Republic of Congo.

== Media ==
Morris frequently appears in the media about the public health response to the COVID-19 pandemic in Florida.

== Honors and awards ==
- Admiral of the Chesapeake by Maryland Governor Parris Glendening, 1997
- Secretary of Defense Medal for Outstanding Public Service, 2003
- James D. Bruce Memorial Award for Distinguished Contributions in Preventive Medicine, American College of Physicians

== Books and book chapters ==
- Morris, J.G., Potter M. Foodborne Infections and Intoxications – 4th Edition. Elsevier; 2013.
- Morris, J.G., Vugia, D.J. Foodborne Infections and Intoxicants – 5th Edition. Elsevier; 2021.
- Morris, J.G. “Cholera and Other Vibrioses.” In: Quah, S.R. and Cockerham, W.C. (eds.) The International Encyclopedia of Public Health, 2nd edition. vol. 2, pp. 1–8. Oxford: Academic Press.
- Morris, J.G. “Human illness associated with harmful algal blooms.” In: Bennett, J.E., Dolin, R., Blaser, M.J. (eds). Principles & Practice of Infectious Diseases, 8th edition. Elsevier 2013
