= Department of Defense Medal for Distinguished Public Service =

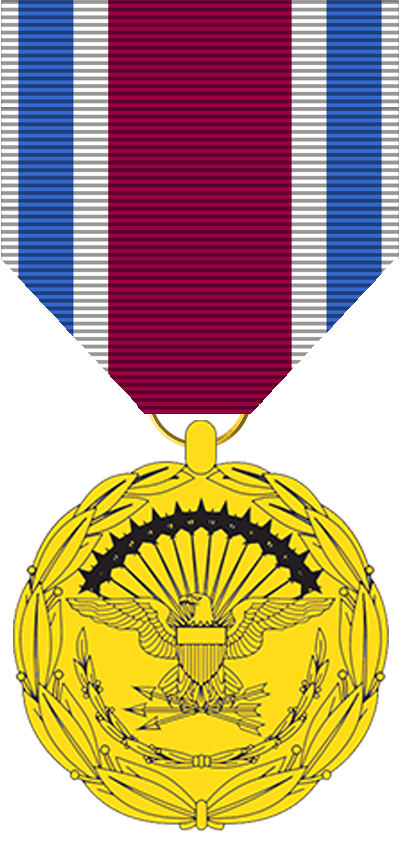
- Type: Civilian public service award
- Awarded for: Exceptionally distinguished service of significance to a DoD Component or function, or Department of Defense as a whole.
- Country: United States
- Presented by: U.S. Secretary of Defense
- Eligibility: Non-career federal employees, private citizens, and foreign nationals.
- Ribbon

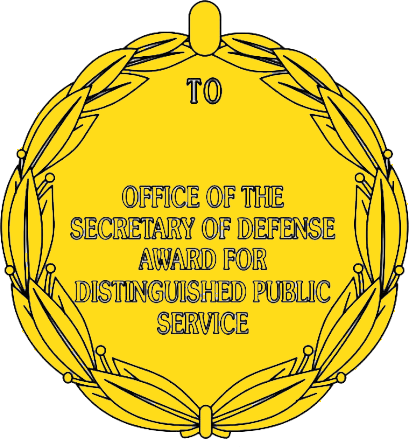
- Reverse
- Established: 1947

Precedence
- Next (lower): Secretary of Defense Medal for Outstanding Public Service

The Department of Defense Medal for Distinguished Public Service is the highest award that is presented by the United States Secretary of Defense to a private citizen, politician, non-career federal employee, or foreign national. It is presented for exceptionally distinguished service of significance to the Department of Defense as a whole, or a DoD Component or function, where recognition at the component level would not be sufficient for the service rendered.

== Eligibility ==
Department of Defense Honorary Awards Programs chart

To be eligible for consideration the individual must have rendered exceptionally distinguished service of significance to the Department of Defense as a whole. Recognition may also be given for distinguished service of such exceptional significance to a Department of Defense Component or Function that recognition at the Component level would be insufficient. The service or assistance may have been rendered at considerable personal sacrifice and inconvenience and should be motivated by patriotism, good citizenship, and a sense of public responsibility.

Normally, it is required that nominees have a direct working relationship with the most senior officials in the Federal government, e.g., Secretary of Defense, Deputy Secretary of Defense, Chairman of the Joint Chiefs of Staff, Secretary of State.

An individual may receive this award more than once with subsequent awards consisting of a bronze, silver, or gold palm, respectively.

== Description ==
The award consists of a gold medal, a miniature medal, a rosette, and a citation signed by the Secretary of Defense.

The obverse of the medal depicts an eagle facing to the right clutching three arrows, below the eagle is a half laurel wreath. Above the eagle are thirteen stars with rays between the stars. This imagery is identical to the seal of the Department of Defense. The reverse contains the inscription "TO...FOR DISTINGUISHED PUBLIC SERVICE TO THE DEPARTMENT OF DEFENSE". The edge of the medallion is surrounded by a laurel wreath on both the obverse and reverse. The medal is suspended from ribbon containing one central strip in maroon, with a white stripe on each side separating it from two blue stripes, with a thin white stripe at each edge.

== Notable recipients ==
- Kelly Johnson, 1981
- Joe Biden, 2025
- Jill Biden, 2025
- Madeleine Korbel Albright, 2016
- Mohammed bin Abdulrahman bin Jassim Al Thani, 2021
- Avi Berkowitz, 2021
- Ehud Barak, 2012
- Zbigniew Brzezinski, 2016
- George W. Bush, 2009
- Peter Carington, 6th Baron Carrington
- Ash Carter, 2013
- Bill Clinton, 2001
- Hillary Clinton, 2013
- Kristin Krohn Devold, 2006
- Eric Fanning, 2017
- Michèle Flournoy, 2012
- Bob Hope, 1971
- Robert Hunter, 1995
- Jim Inhofe, 2022
- Deborah Lee James, 2017
- Jeh Johnson, 2016
- Frank Kendall III, 2017
- Henry Kissinger, 2016
- Shigeru Kitamura, 2020
- Michael Kratsios
- Jared Kushner, 2021
- Marcel Lettre, 2017
- Craig H. Martell, 2024
- Michael J. McCord, 2017
- John M. McHugh, 2015
- Brian P. McKeon, 2017
- Judith A. Miller
- Ernest Moniz, 2016
- Jamie M. Morin, 2017
- Robert O'Brien
- Barack Obama, 2017
- Zohar Palti, 2022
- DJ Patil, 2016
- Edward Angus Powell Jr.
- Ronald Reagan, 1989
- Paul Ryan, 2018
- Dan Scavino, 2021
- Eric Schmidt, 2017
- Christopher Scolese, 2026
- Brent Scowcroft, 2016
- Javier Solana, 1999
- Steven Spielberg, 1999
- Jens Stoltenberg, 2024
- John Warner, 2016
- Kathryn Wheelbarger, 2020
- Manfred Woerner, 1993
- Albert Wohlstetter
- Robert O. Work, 2017
- Lewis Greer Zirkle Jr., 2018
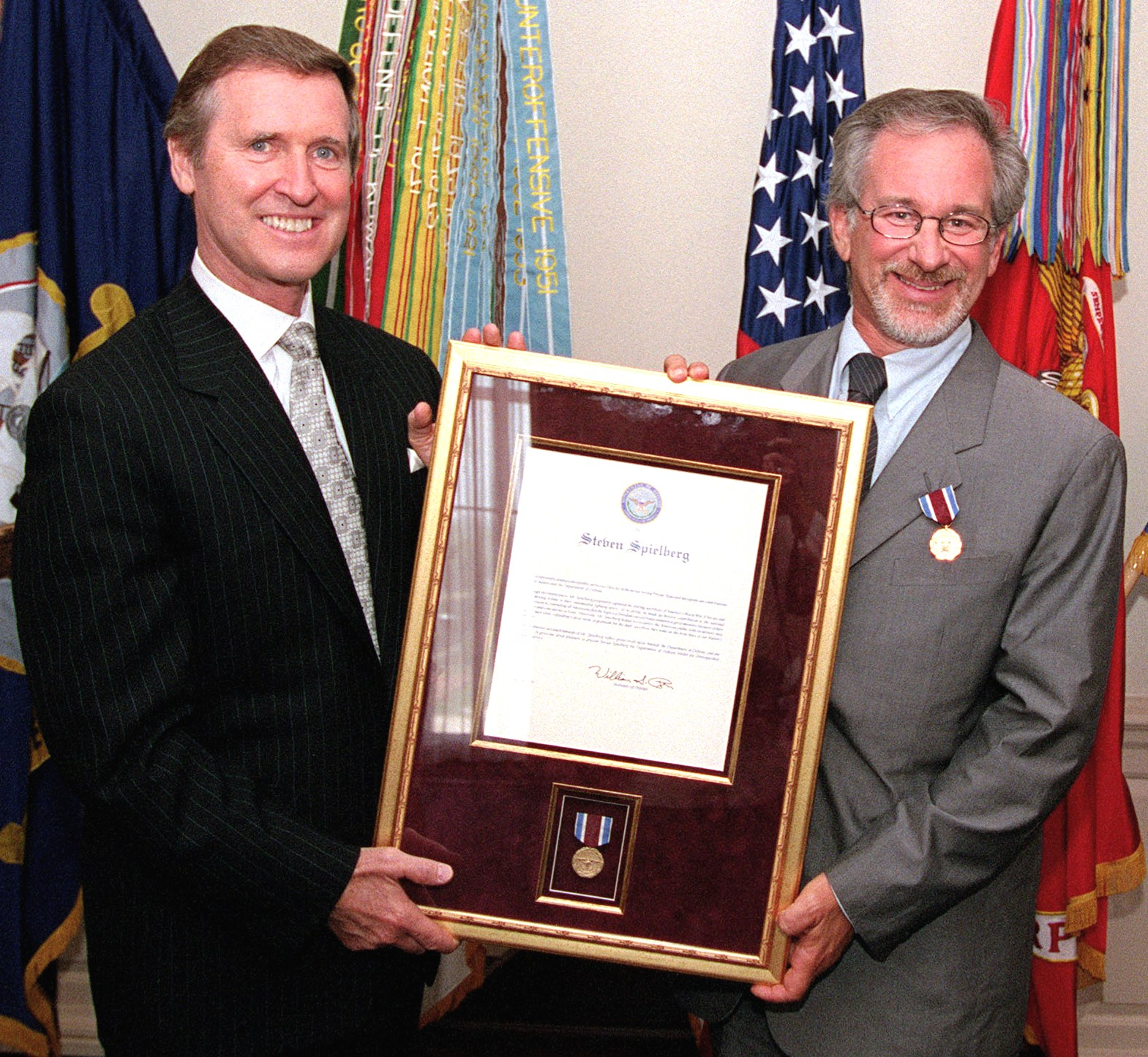
Secretary of Defense William S. Cohen presents a framed citation accompanying the medal given to Steven Spielberg.

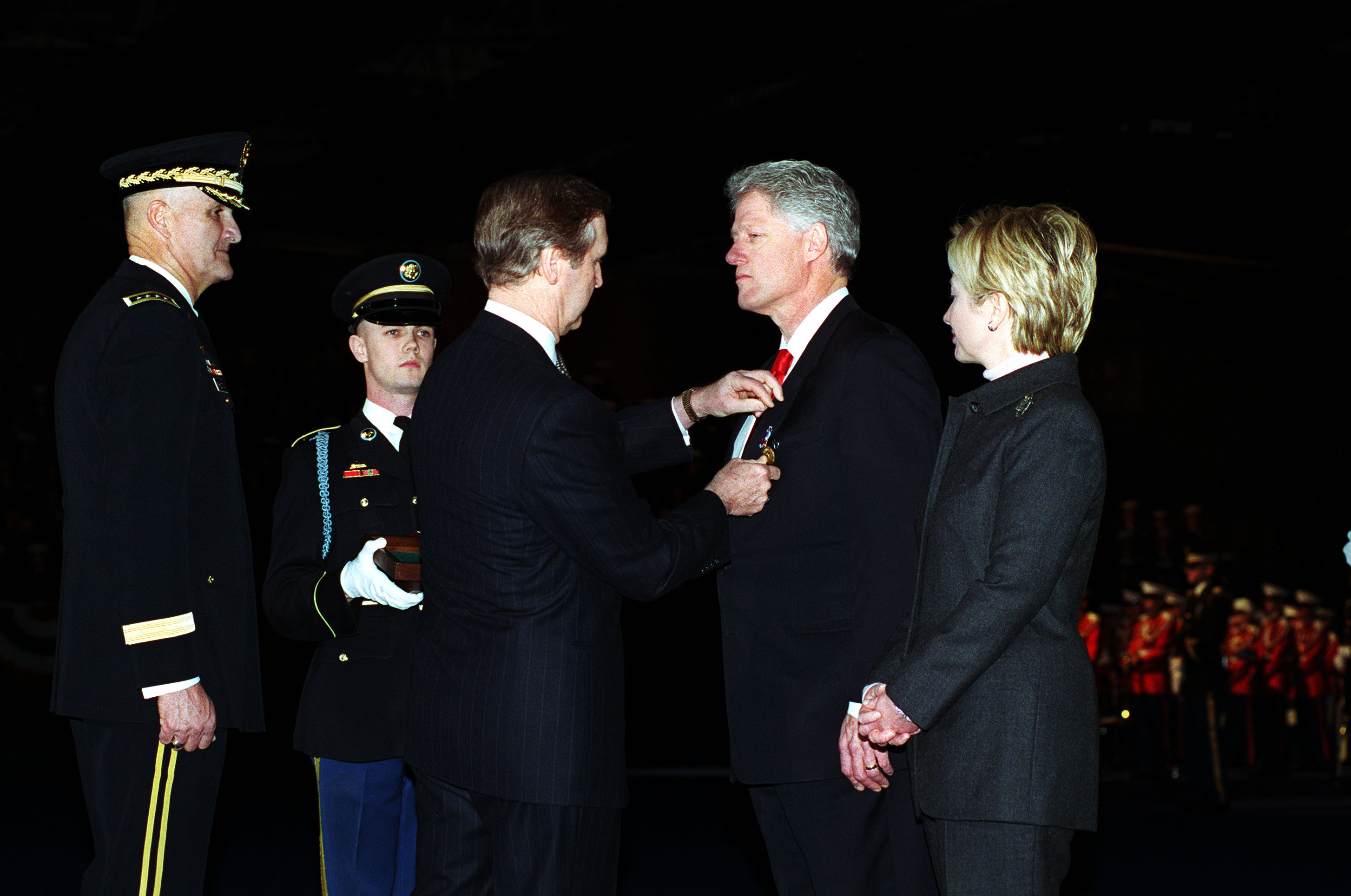
Secretary of Defense William S. Cohen presents the medal to President Bill Clinton.

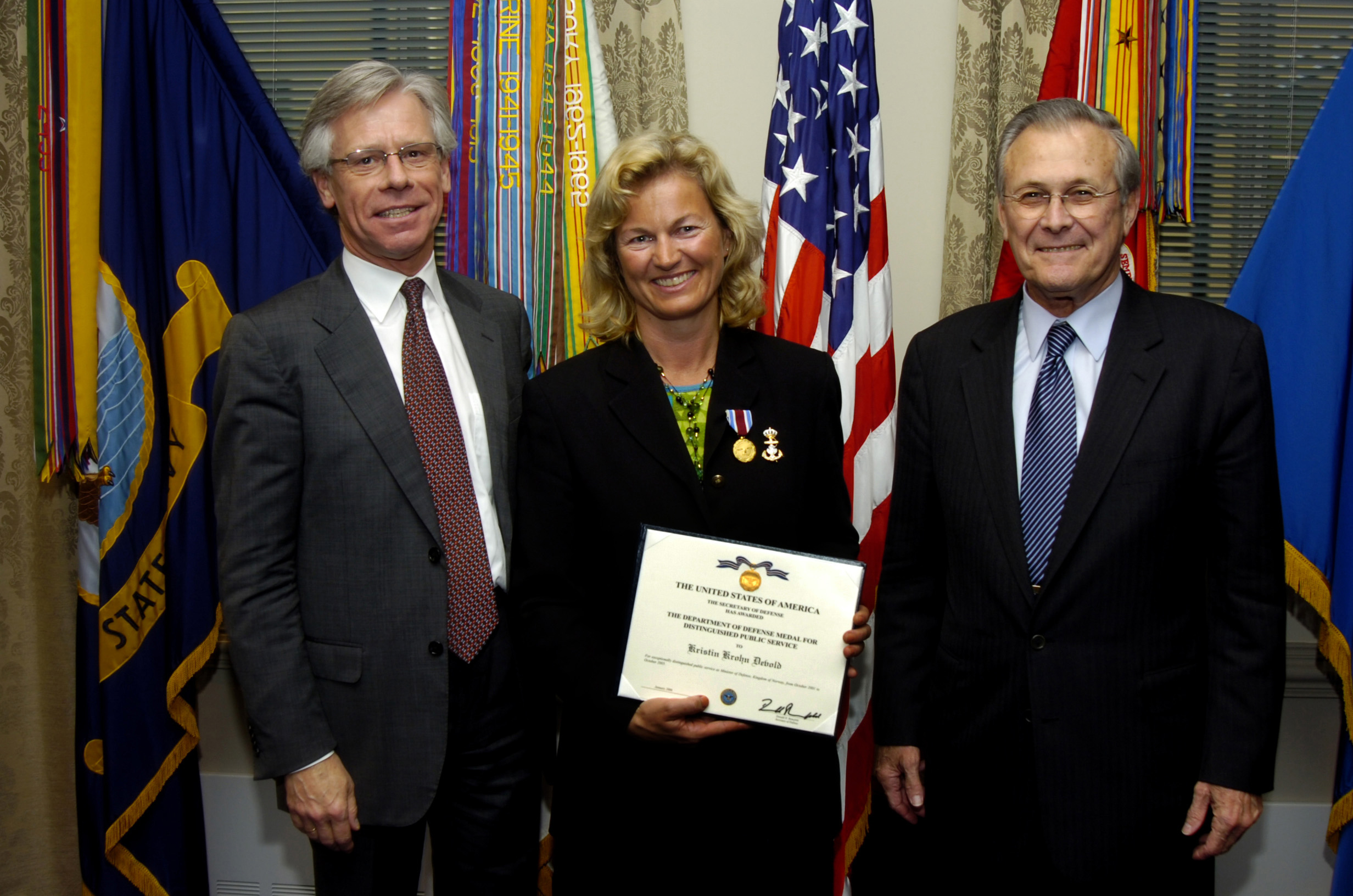
Secretary of Defense Donald H. Rumsfeld presents Kristin Devold with the medal.

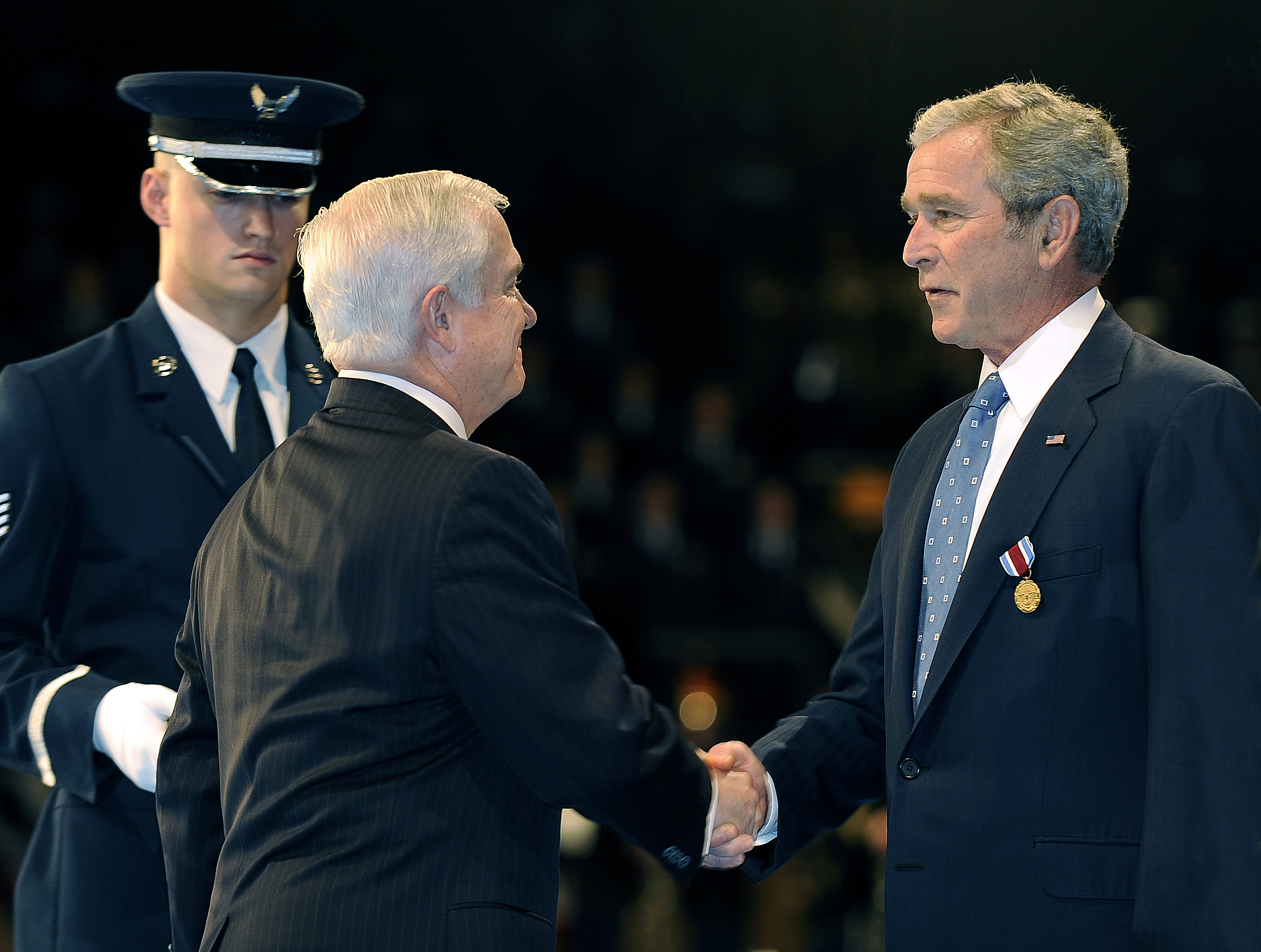
Secretary of Defense Robert M. Gates awards the medal to President George W. Bush.

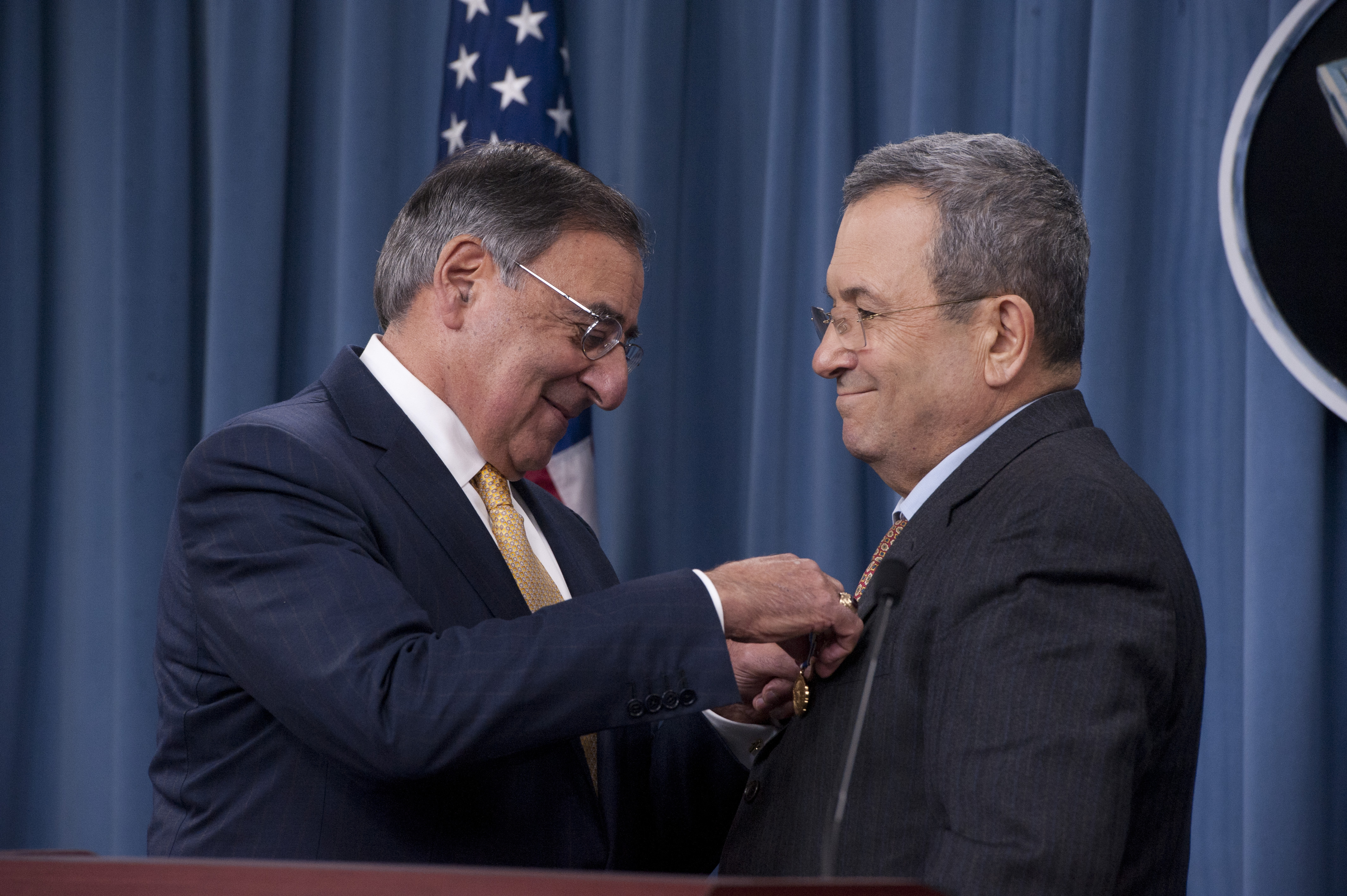
Secretary of Defense Leon E. Panetta presents Israeli Minister of Defense Ehud Barak with the medal.

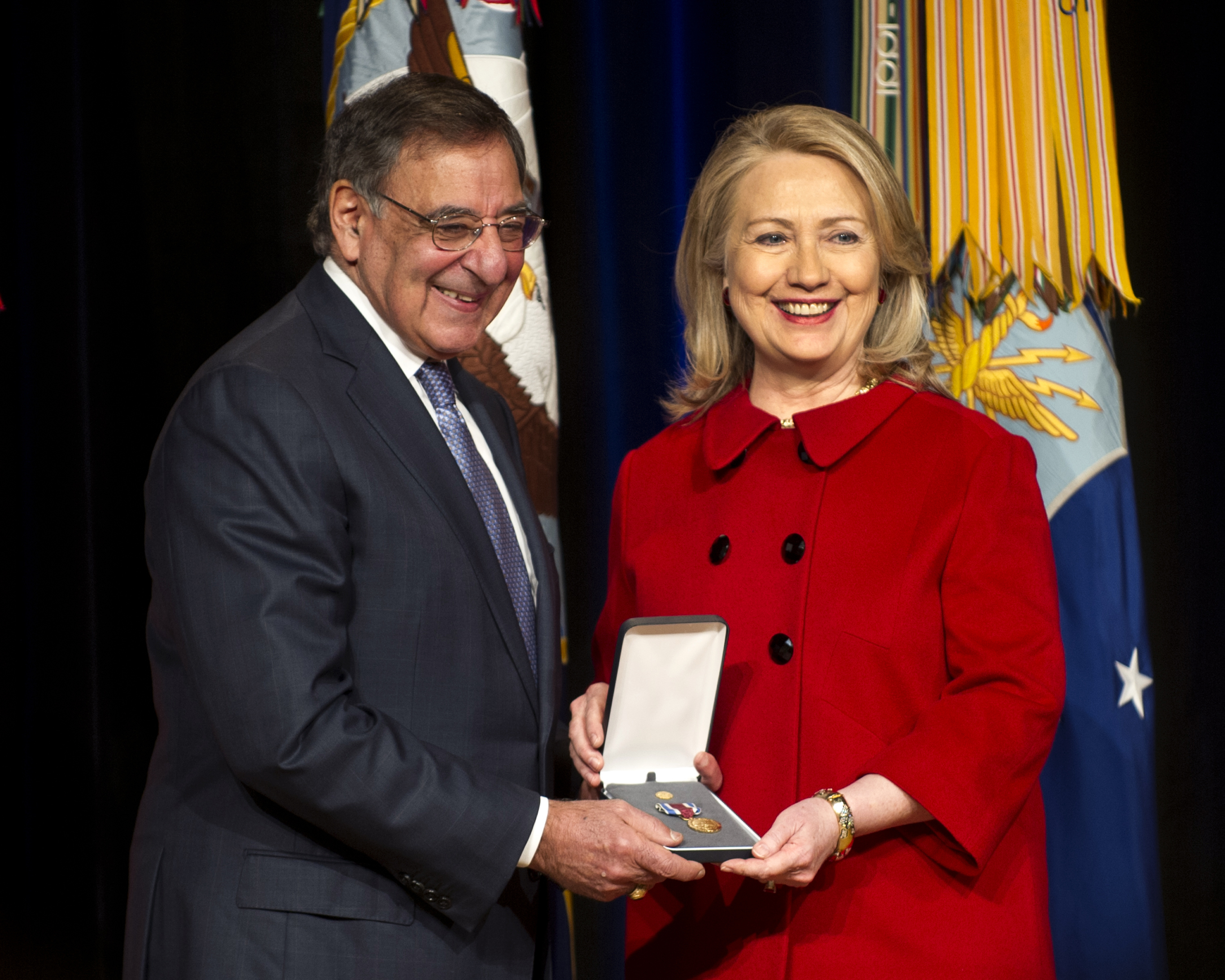
Secretary Panetta presents former Secretary of State Hillary Rodham Clinton with the medal.

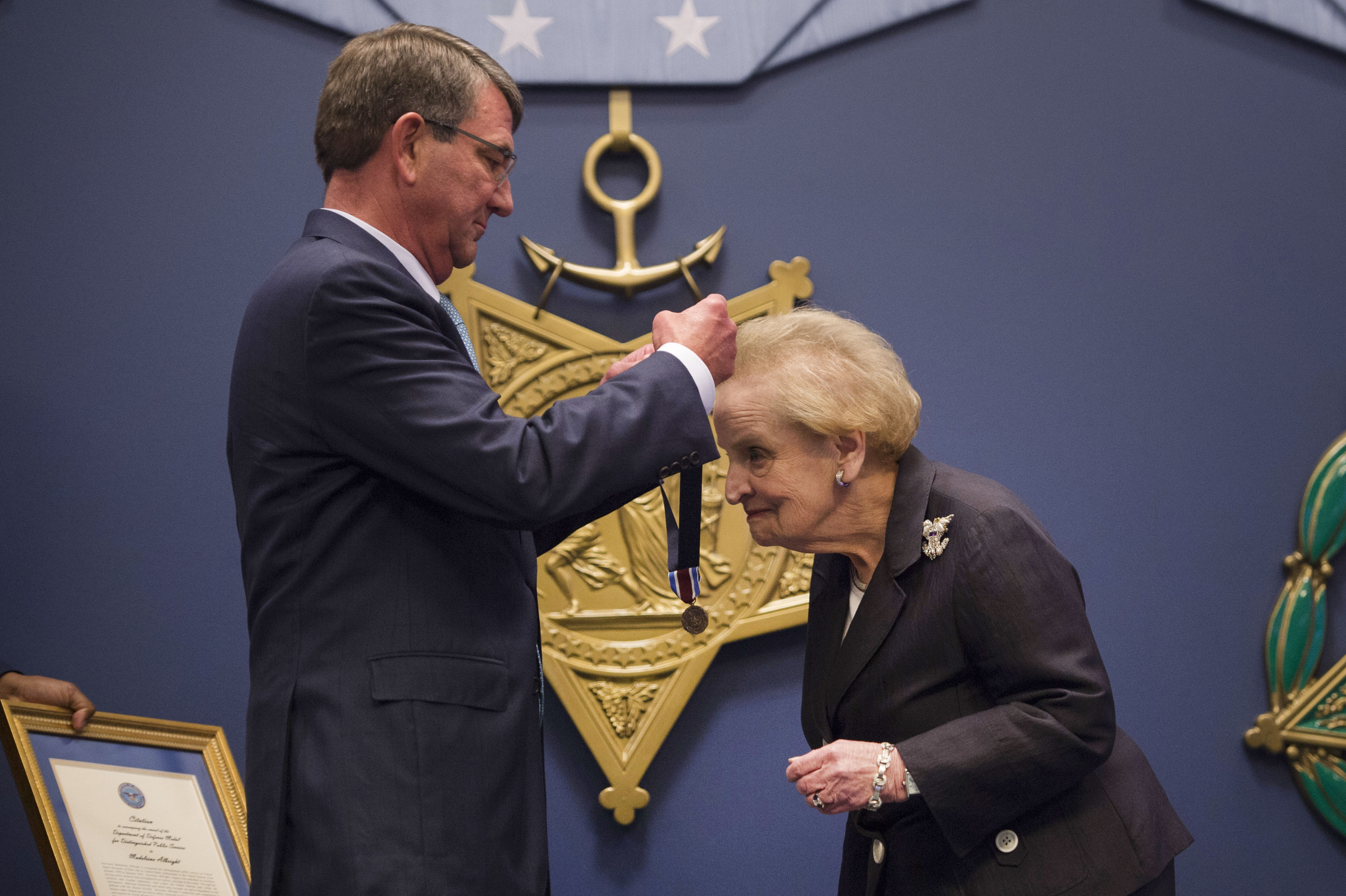
Secretary of Defense Ash Carter presents the medal to Madeleine Albright.

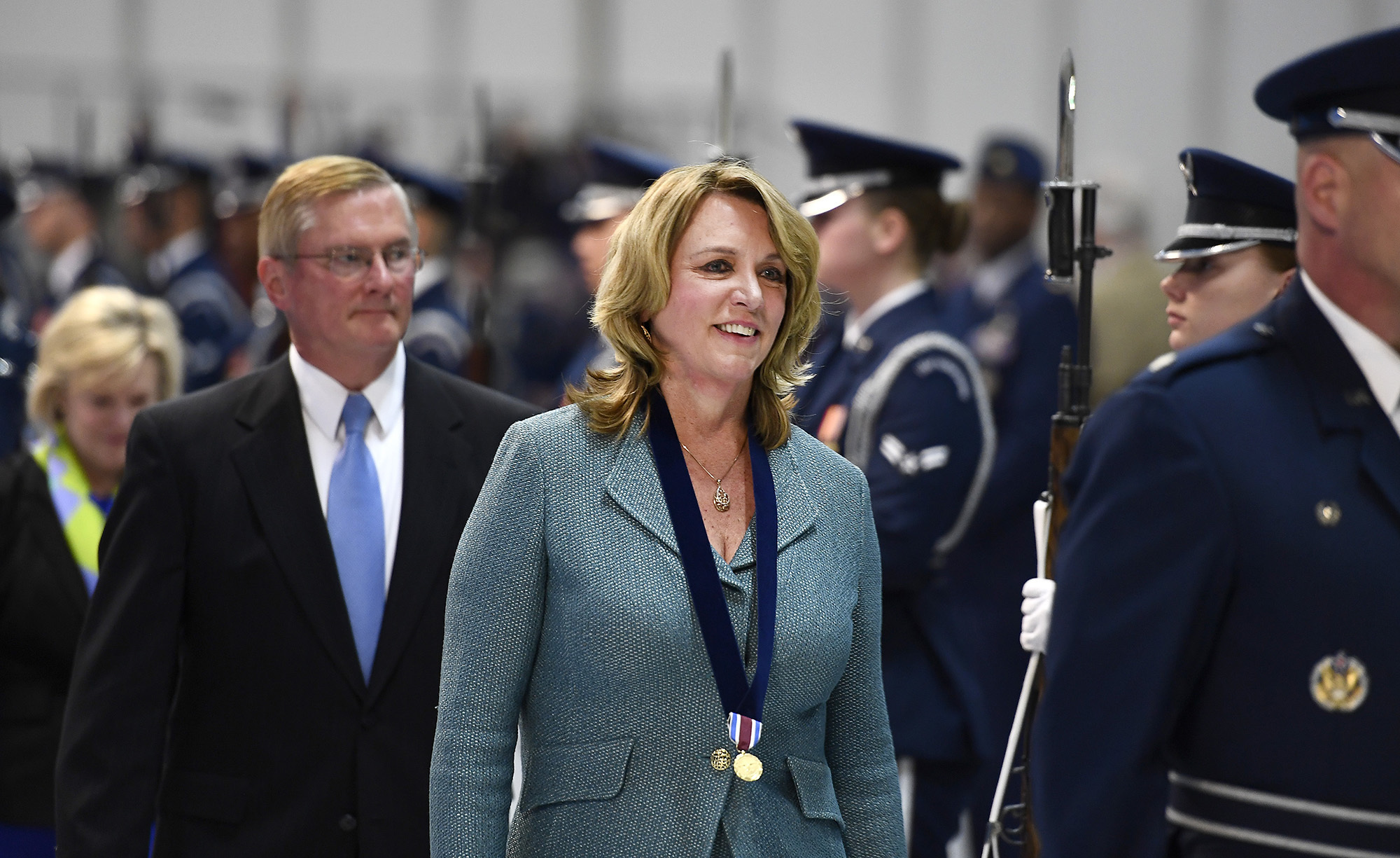
Secretary of the Air Force Deborah Lee James departs her farewell ceremony at Joint Base Andrews wearing the medal.

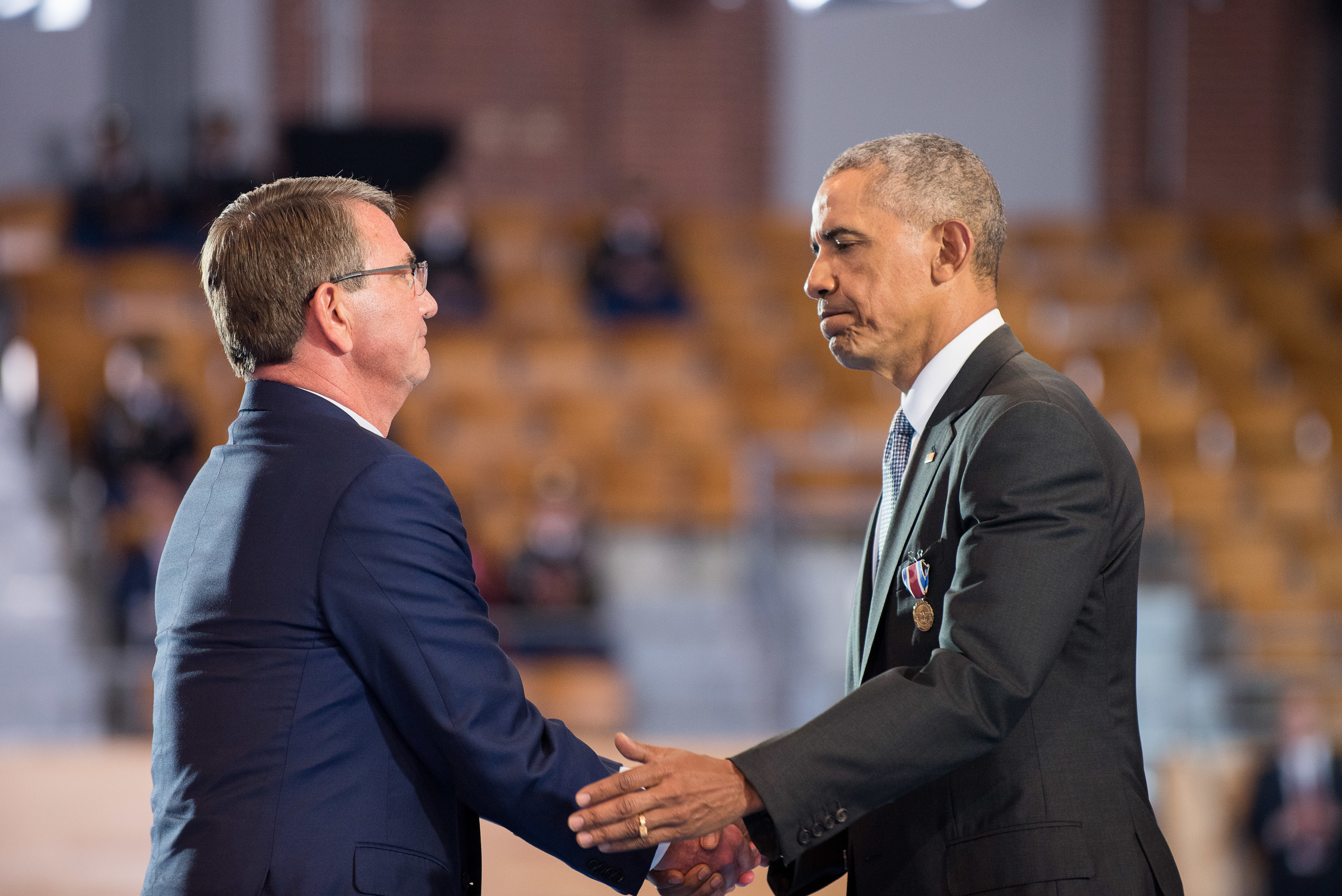
Secretary Carter awards President Obama with the medal during an Armed Forces full honor review farewell ceremony.

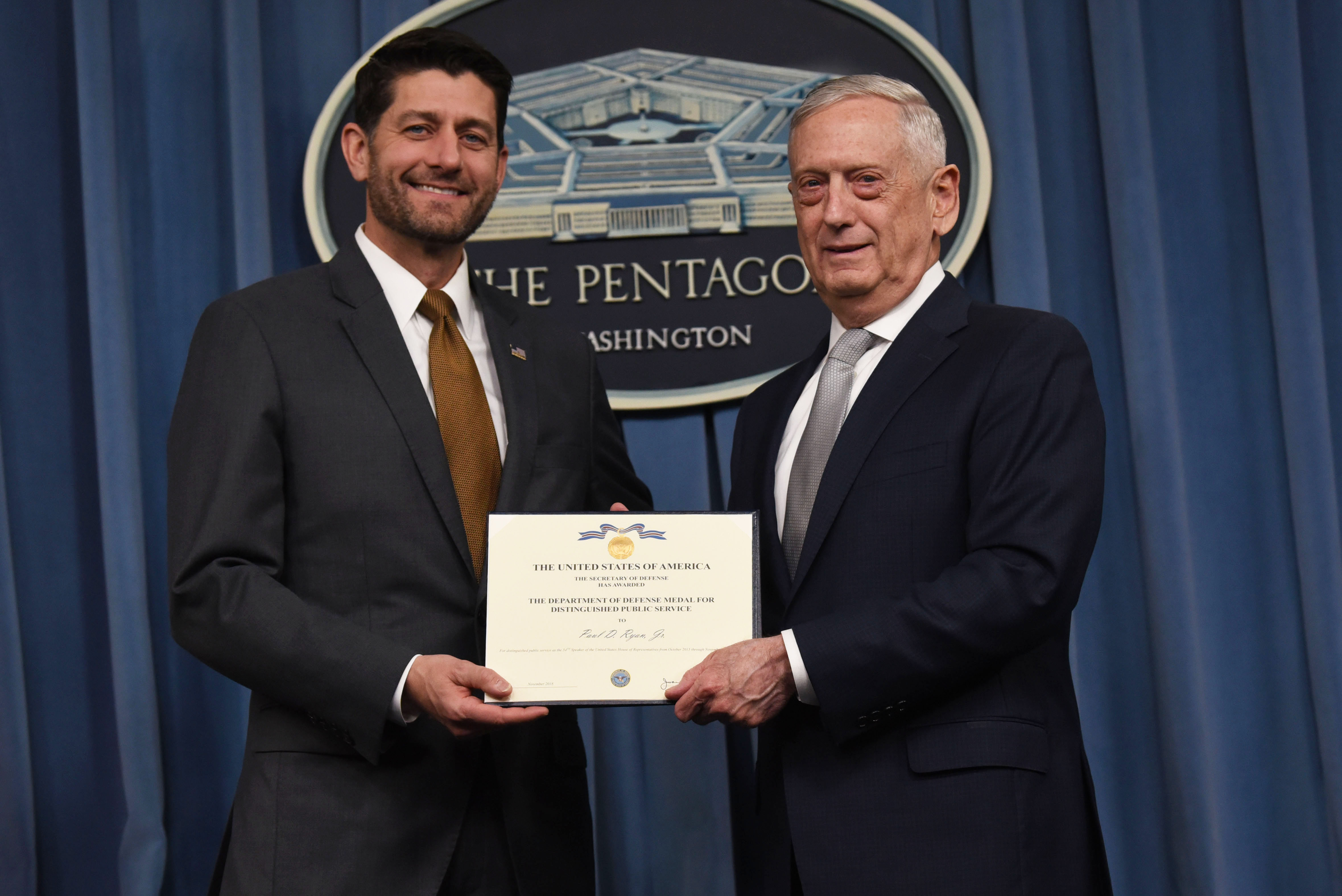
Secretary of Defense James N. Mattis awards House Speaker Paul Ryan with the medal.

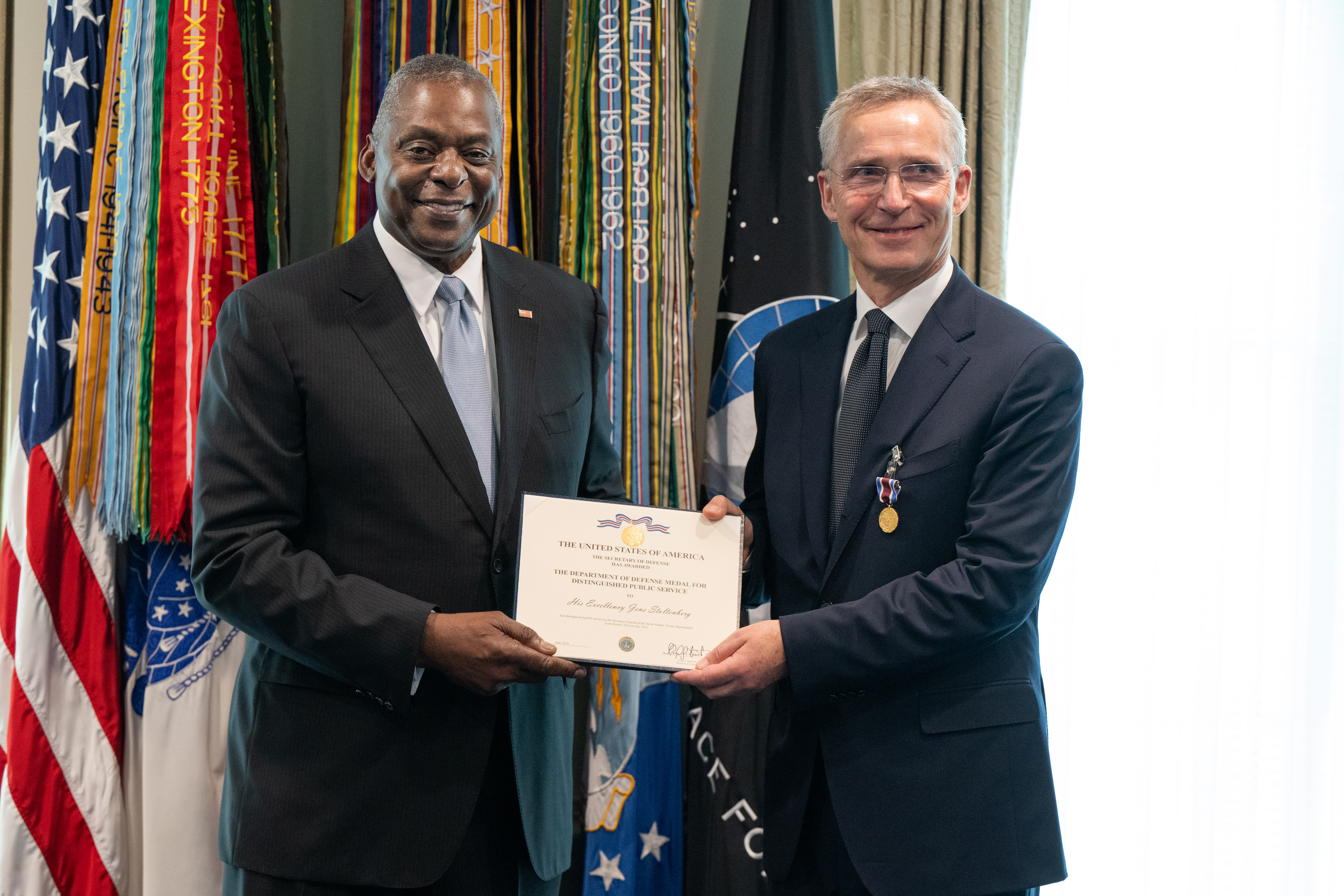
Secretary of Defense Lloyd J. Austin III awards the medal to NATO Secretary General Jens Stoltenberg

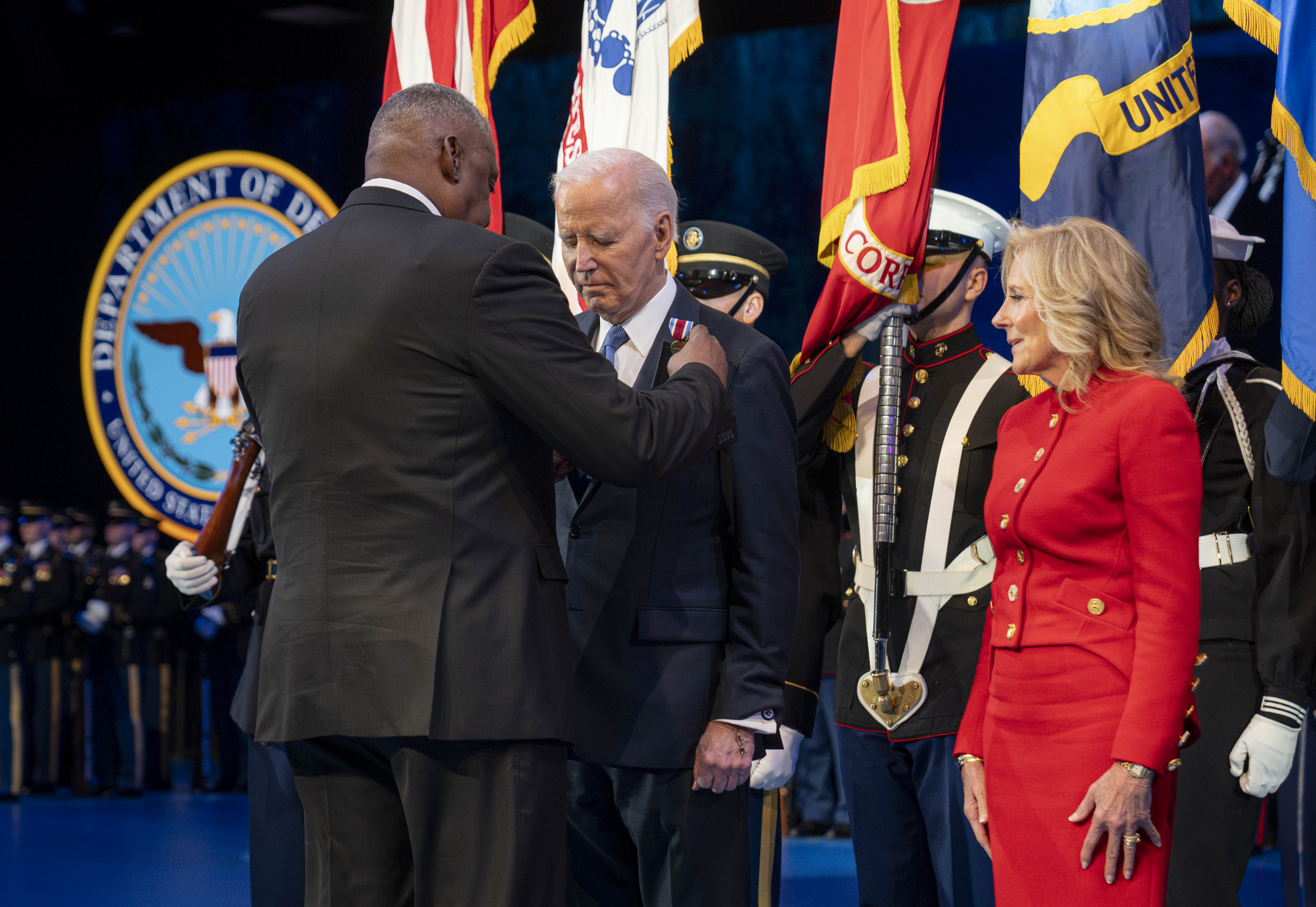
Secretary of Defense Austin III awards the medal to President Biden

== See also ==
- Awards and decorations of the United States government
- Navy Distinguished Public Service Award
