= Handzlik =

Handzlik is a surname. Notable people with the surname include:

- Dagmara Handzlik (born 1986), Cypriot long-distance runner
- Małgorzata Handzlik (born 1965), Polish politician
- Mariusz Handzlik (1965–2010), Polish diplomat
