= Robert L. Gordon III =

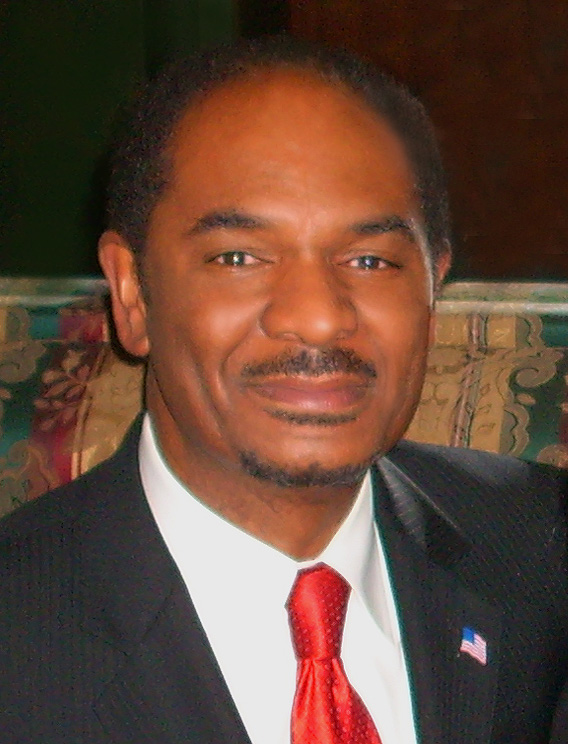
- Born: Robert Lee Gordon III; March 15, 1957 (age 69); Richmond, Virginia
- Education: West Point (BS); Princeton (MPA)
- Occupations: Executive, technology and services
- Known for: Deputy Under Secretary of Defense; Deputy Assistant Secretary of Defense (Military Community and Family Policy); Co-founder, Service America; Founding Chair, ServiceNation: Mission Serve; featured speaker on leadership, technology, and service
- Spouse: Millie Gordon
- Children: Robert L. Gordon IV; Daniel C. Gordon
- Awards: The Secretary of Defense Medal for Outstanding Public Service, The Franklin Award, Bernard Gill Urban Service-Learning Leadership Award - National Youth Leadership Council, Edward P. Bullard Distinguished Alumnus Award, Princeton University; Rotary’s Distinguished Presidential Citation; honorific Order of Saint Barbara (two awards); Legion of Merit; the Defense Meritorious Service Medal; the Outstanding Volunteer Service Medal

Robert "Rob" L. Gordon III is a cross-sector leader in the government, military, academic, nonprofit and high tech sectors. Gordon was appointed the Deputy Under Secretary of Defense for Military Community and Family Policy on July 19, 2010, serving under U.S. President Barack Obama. In the Defense Department he was responsible for defense-wide policy, program execution and oversight of global community support programs to care for, support, and empower 2 million Service members, 1.2 million military spouses, 2 million children, and over 2 million military families worldwide. He oversaw the Department of Defense school system (DoDEA) that at that time served approximately 90,000 students in 194 schools in 14 districts located in 12 foreign countries, seven states, Guam, and Puerto Rico. He oversaw voluntary education for over half a million active duty military service members; defense resale for over 500 commissaries and exchanges; military spouse education and career advancement for 1.2 million military spouses; child development and youth activities programs; state liaison initiatives; family assistance and non-medical counseling services; and collaborated with Congressional leaders, White House leaders, business and non profit sectors, chambers of commerce, academic communities, and a multitude of federal and state agencies to strengthen the resilience and well-being of the military community.

Included within the purview of his office was the strategic development of quality education for more than one million military school aged children. His oversight included two Armed Forces Retirement Homes, casualty and mortuary affairs, and military funeral honors. During his tenure, Gordon spearheaded the creation of the Military Spouse Employment Partnership initiative, a partnership with currently more than 400 employer partners nationwide that have hired over 120,000 military spouses since the program's inception. He also led the effort to overhaul the infrastructure of 160 public schools on military installations across the United States. For his service he was awarded the Secretary of Defense Medal for Outstanding Public Service.

Gordon is currently the Senior Strategic Leader for AI and Digital Innovation at Document Storage Systems, Inc.(DSS). He is formerly the President of Be the Change, a social impact organization that creates manages national issue-based campaigns to inspire broad cross-sector coalitions to bring about positive changes in American society. Gordon was a senior executive at City Year, an education-based national service program that engages 17 to 24-year-old young adults to serve as full-time national service corps members at one of 27 cities across the United States as tutors and mentors, running after-school programs and leading youth leadership programs.

Gordon was also the Founding Chair of ServiceNation: Mission Serve, a nationwide initiative established in 2009 within the Service Nation network that activates and convenes civilian and military organizations across the United States to more effectively focus on issues associated with Veterans, military families, and active-duty service members reintegrating back into the communities across the country.

== Biography ==
=== Upbringing, education, and family life ===
Born in Richmond, Virginia, Gordon is the son of an American Army officer and a schoolteacher. Most of his youth was spent overseas in Taiwan and Germany. As a child he lived with his family in the Tian Mu district in Taipei, Taiwan, where he attended the Dominican International School in downtown Taipei. He also lived in Frankfurt and Augsburg, Germany, where he attended Augsburg American High School for two years. As a military brat, Gordon lived in New York, Virginia, and Colorado in the United States. He graduated in 1975 from General William J. Palmer High School in Colorado Springs, Colorado. He is a graduate of both West Point and Princeton University.

=== Military career ===
Gordon entered the United States Military Academy at West Point in 1975 and graduated in 1979 with a BS degree. He was commissioned a second lieutenant in the Field Artillery. He went to Ranger School after his West Point graduation and afterwards was assigned to the 4th Infantry Division (Mechanized) near Colorado Springs, Colorado. He held numerous artillery assignments and was selected to be the Aide-de-Camp to then Brigadier General Colin Powell from 1981 to 1982. After his tour at Fort Carson he attended the Field Artillery Advanced Course at Fort Sill, Oklahoma, where he was the Distinguished Graduate. Gordon then commanded a heavy artillery company in Bamberg, Germany, and soon thereafter was selected to return to West Point to teach in the Department of Social Sciences. He attended the Princeton School of Public and International Affairs at Princeton University, and earned an MA degree in Public Affairs in 1989. Gordon was assigned to the Department of Social Sciences at West Point where he served as both an instructor and Assistant Professor of American Politics, and the Executive Officer of the Department. Gordon then won the prestigious White House Fellowship and served in both the Department of Veterans Affairs and the White House. Following his fellowship he returned to field duty at Fort Carson, and eventually was assigned to West Point as the Director of American Politics in the Department of Social Sciences. His military education includes the Field Artillery Officer Advanced Course, the United States Army Command and General Staff College and an instructor and graduate of the National War College. Gordon retired from the Army as a colonel.

=== Civilian national service ===
While at West Point, Gordon co-founded and was for six years the Executive Director of Service America, a privately funded program that brought together cadets at West Point and AmeriCorps members to serve as tutors, build low income housing, and improve environmental awareness in six cities in three states. Participants served in Federal Way, Bremerton, Seattle, and Yakima in Washington State; Chicago, Illinois, and Austin, Texas.

Gordon joined City Year in 2006. He sat on City Year's Board of Trustees two years prior to joining the organization. As City Year's Senior Vice President of Civic Leadership and Chief People and Program Officer, Gordon led and oversaw the People and Program Group, including the Departments of Human Resources, Recruiting, Research and Evaluation, Program Development, and the Office of the Dean. He oversaw the recruitment, selection, education, systematic learning, and training of City Year's now 3,500 person youth corps; the continued development of City Year's alumni as "leaders for life"; and the engagement of children and teens in City Year's service and civic leadership initiatives in cities across the United States. He led the creation of City Year's "Give a Year" program, now named the City Year Alumni University Partners - a network of higher education institutions that provides benefits to members of the City Year network.

As the Founding Chair of ServiceNation: Mission Serve, Gordon led the national effort to create partnerships between civilian service and military organizations that connect the two sectors in meaningful ways; address key issues for veterans, military families and active duty service members; and develop a new generation of leaders who can operate effectively in both service sectors to address the nation's most pressing security and policy challenges. Gordon, who was a member of the Leadership Council for Service Nation, worked with Ross Cohen, a fellow Princeton graduate and Army veteran, to create over 30 partnerships across the country that were inaugurated by First Lady Michelle Obama, and Jill Biden, on Veterans Day, November 11, 2009. ServiceNation: Mission Serve is now Got Your 6, a campaign of the Bob Woodruff Foundation focused on Veterans empowerment and bridging the civilian-military divide.

Throughout his life he has been involved in leadership, strategy, service, policymaking and education. From 1992 to 1993, as a White House Fellow, Gordon served in the White House as the Director of Special Operations for the Office of National Service and helped to found the AmeriCorps program. Before serving in the White House, he was the Special Assistant to three Secretaries of Veterans Affairs - the late Ed Derwinski and Jesse Brown; and Anthony Principi.

Gordon has spent considerable time abroad researching national service systems. He was a member of a U.S. citizen's delegation to Italy in 1997 to help reform Italy's national service system. In 2006, he was a member of the American Jewish Committee Task Force to recommended a new national service strategy for the United States.

Gordon is a member of the French-American Foundation and selected to its Young Leaders Program from 1994 - 1996, and a former board member. He served as a Center for Public Management Fellow at the Brookings Institution in 1996, and is also a former President of the West Point-Highland Falls Rotary Club and the recipient of Rotary's Distinguished Presidential Citation. In 2006 he was the recipient of Princeton University's Edward P. Bullard Distinguished Alumnus Award, and he was the recipient of the Bernard Gill Urban Service-Learning Leadership Award from National Youth Leadership Council.

Gordon moved into the world of high technology after leaving government service, and was the Chief Strategy Officer of Upskill, a smart glasses software company headquartered in Vienna, Virginia; and Chief Global officer of Connected Living.

Gordon is a former board member of SeaChange Capital. He was the Practitioner in Residence at Princeton University's School of Public and International Affairs (SPIA) from 2007 to 2008, and was on SPIA's advisory council. He is an advisor to several technology startups, including Unite US and Warrior Centric Health. He is a board member of Grab the Torch, the Service Year Alliance, and AVID. In 2017 Gordon was the recipient of the Franklin Award by the National Conference on Citizenship.
