= Walter Oi =

American economist (1929–2013)

Walter Yasuo Oi (Japanese: 大井 庸男, July 1, 1929 – December 24, 2013) was the Elmer B. Milliman Professor of Economics at the University of Rochester in Rochester, New York. He was a fellow of the American Academy of Arts and Sciences, a distinguished fellow of the Society of Labor Economists, and a recipient of the Secretary of Defense Medal for Outstanding Public Service. He is credited with providing the economic basis for a voluntary military and the elimination of a draft.

== Early life ==
Oi was born in Los Angeles, California. He obtained a Ph.D. in Economics from the University of Chicago in 1961.

At age 13, Oi and his family were detained by U.S. authorities and sent along with other Japanese-Americans to an internment camp following the signing of Executive Order 9066. For the first few days of his internment, Oi and his family lived in a stall at Santa Anita Park.

Oi was already losing his eyesight during World War II.

== Role in the development of an all volunteer force ==
In his contribution to The Costs and Implications of an All-Volunteer Force (1967) (of which he was also editor) Oi outlined the different calculations required to differentiate between the budgetary cost of military personnel and the economic cost to the nation of conscription. He identified the hidden costs of drafted force as the impact on the mental well-being of those drafted. Oi estimated the loss in monetary terms of this effect to be between $826 million and $1.134 billion.

Oi was then employed as the staff economist on President Nixon's Commission on an All-Volunteer Armed Force (the Gates Commission) in the early 1970s. His research was used as a key piece of evidence in the debate to end the policy of conscription. Conscription ended in 1973.

== Role in relation to disability ==
Oi was the vice-chair of the President's Commission on Employment of People with Disabilities.

== Awards and honors ==
Oi was elected a fellow of the American Academy of Arts and Sciences in 1993. Oi was named a distinguished fellow of the American Economic Association, a distinguished fellow of the Society of Labor Economists, and a fellow of the Econometrics Society. In 2000, Oi received the Secretary of Defense Medal for Outstanding Public Service for his work leading to the adoption of an all-volunteer military.

== Personal ==
During World War II, Oi was interned at Amache, the Granada internment camp since he was a Nisei, an American of second generation Japanese descent.

Oi had been gradually losing his sight for the majority of his life and unable to read text since entering college. By 1956, he was totally blind. He continued to teach, collaborate and work until he died, aged 84, in Rochester, New York.

== Bibliography ==
- Oi, Walter Y, ed. (1967). The Costs and Implications of an All-Volunteer Force. Chicago: University of Chicago Press.
- Oi, Walter Y (1967). "The Economic Cost of the Draft". American Economic Review. 57 (2): 39–62.
- Oi, Walter Y. (1992). "Work for Americans with Disabilities". The Annals of the American Academy of Political and Social Science. 523 (1). American Academy of Political Science: 159–174. doi:10.1177/0002716292523001014. S2CID 154396344.
