= Secretary of Defense Medal for Outstanding Public Service =

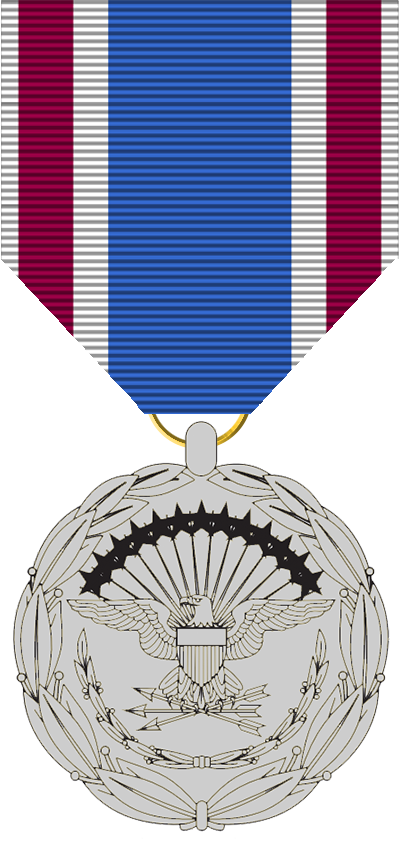
- Type: Civilian public service award
- Awarded for: “Demonstration of outstanding service of significance to the Department of Defense involving personal sacrifice and inconvenience in the performance or assistance of such service; and motivation by patriotism, good citizenship, and a sense of public responsibility”
- Country: United States
- Presented by: Secretary of Defense
- Eligibility: Non-career Federal employees, private citizens, and foreign nationals.
- Ribbon

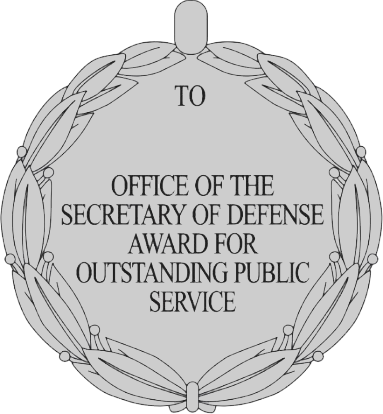
- Reverse
- Status: Currently awarded

Precedence
- Next (higher): Department of Defense Medal for Distinguished Public Service
- Next (lower): Office of the Secretary of Defense Medal for Exceptional Public Service

The Secretary of Defense Medal for Outstanding Public Service is the second highest award presented by the Secretary of Defense to non-career Federal employees, private citizens, and foreign nationals for contributions, assistance, or support to Department of Defense functions that are extensive enough to warrant recognition, but are lesser in scope and impact than is required for the DoD Medal for Distinguished Public Service. The Secretary of Defense is the approval authority. This award consists of a silver medal, a miniature medal, a rosette, and a citation signed by the Secretary of Defense. An individual may receive this award more than once. Subsequent awards consist of the foregoing recognition devices and a bronze, silver, or gold palm, as appropriate.

== Notable recipients ==
- David S. Alberts
- Richard Armitage
- David J. Barron
- Steven G. Bradbury
- Carl Brashear
- Laura Bush
- Hillary Clinton
- Natalie Crawford
- Gloria C. Duffy
- Michele Flournoy
- Brett Giroir
- Robert L. Gordon III
- Mariusz Handzlik
- William A. Jeffrey
- Deborah Lee James
- Jill Kelley
- Zalmay Khalilzad
- Jacques Paul Klein
- George K. Krikorian
- Zachary J. Lemnios
- MITRE Corporation
- Michael P. Mulroy
- Walter Oi
- Elissa Slotkin
- James B. Thayer
- J. Glenn Morris

== See also ==
- Awards and decorations of the United States government
