= Natalie Crawford =

American operations researcher

Natalie Wilson Crawford
- Born: 1939; Boonville, Indiana
- Died: 2025 (aged 85–86)
- Education: University of California, Los Angeles
- Known for: Air defense analysis; military aircraft force planning; directing RAND's Project Air Force
- Awards: Member, National Academy of Engineering; Fellow, American Institute of Aeronautics and Astronautics; Secretary of Defense Medal for Outstanding Public Service
- Scientific career
- Fields: Operations research, military strategy, air and space policy
- Workplaces: RAND Corporation; Frederick S. Pardee RAND Graduate School

Natalie Wilson Crawford (1939 – 2025) was an American operations researcher and military strategist specializing in air defense, air and space power, and military aircraft force planning. She worked at the RAND Corporation for more than 60 years and directed RAND's Project Air Force from 1997 to 2006.

== Education and career ==
Crawford is originally from Boonville, Indiana. Her mother, the daughter of a local banker, had degrees in teaching and laboratory technology; her grandmother was a schoolteacher. Her father was a coal miner, farmer, and dry cleaning shop owner. She moved to Santa Monica, California with her family as a teenager, and majored in mathematics at the University of California, Los Angeles, supporting her studies through part-time work.

After graduating, she immediately applied to work for the RAND Corporation, but was not hired. Instead, she obtained a position as a computer programmer at North American Aviation, through a connection with an executive there for whom she had worked as a babysitter. She finally joined the RAND Corporation in 1964, at first working there as a computer programmer in the aeronautics/astronautics department's armament group. She has been a vice president of the corporation, and director of its Project Air Force from 1997 to 2006. On stepping down from this directorship, she became a senior fellow, distinguished chair in air and space policy, and professor in the Frederick S. Pardee RAND Graduate School.

Her areas of expertise included tactical aircraft, aircraft survivability, munitions and ranges, electronic combat, theater air defense, and space systems. Her major studies included work on next-generation tactical fighters, the first Gulf War air campaign, cyber operations, and future roles for unmanned air systems.

Crawford retired from RAND in 2025 and died later that year at age 86.

== Recognition ==
Crawford was elected to the National Academy of Engineering in 2001, "for outstanding engineering, development, and analytical contributions to planning for the U.S. Air Force".

In 2016, Crawford received an honorary Doctor of Engineering degree from Michigan State University.

She was named as a 2017 Honorary Fellow of the American Institute of Aeronautics and Astronautics, the highest distinction of the institute.

She was the recipient of the 2003 Vance R. Wanner Memorial Award of the Military Operations Research Society, of the 2003 Lt. Gen. Glenn A. Kent Leadership Award, of the 2006 Secretary of Defense Medal for Outstanding Public Service, of the Combat Survivability Lifetime Achievement Award of the National Defense Industrial Association, of a 2011 Lifetime Achievement Award of the Air Force Association, and of the 2012 Thomas D. White National Defense Award.
