= Infectious Disease Pharmacokinetics Laboratory =

Research facility at the University of Florida

- Type: Research/Clinical Laboratory
- Headquarters: University of Florida
- Location: United States
- Director: Dr. Charles Peloquin
- Website: Official website

The Infectious Disease Pharmacokinetics Laboratory (IDPL) is a research facility that is affiliated with the College of Pharmacy at the University of Florida.

== Overview ==
IDPL focuses on the treatments for infections that include HIV, tuberculosis, and other serious infections. This facility provides therapeutic drug monitoring (TDM) using high-performance liquid chromatography and gas chromatography. IDPL has been in existence for two decades and has developed individualized drug regimens by monitoring a patient's blood plasma or serum for target drug concentrations and then interpreting these results and advising physicians how to adjust a drug's dosage to achieve an optimal outcome. This interdisciplinary method allows IDPL to assess each patient's ability to absorb, metabolize and excrete drugs, which then enables them to recommend customized drug dosages based upon these pharmacokinetic factors as well as the severity of the patient's infection. IDPL primarily focuses on tuberculosis, but they also develop drug regimens for cancer patients with fungal infections, and people with HIV.

The Infectious Disease Pharmacokinetics Laboratory also serves as a national reference center for the determination of serum concentrations for the antimycobacterial, antifungal, and anti-HIV drugs, as well as linezolid.

== Leadership ==
The director is Dr. Charles Peloquin who has been leading this facility for over 20 years. Dr. Peloquin's research efforts focuses on therapeutic drug monitoring and clinical trials for patients with advanced mycobacterial diseases.
