= Mariusz Handzlik =

Polish diplomat (1965-2010)

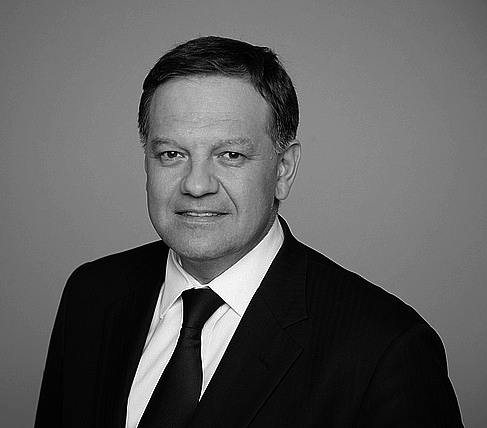
- Born: 11 June 1965; Bielsko-Biała
- Died: 10 April 2010 (aged 44); Smolensk, Russia
- Cause of death: Airplane Crash
- Citizenship: Polish
- Children: 3

Mariusz Handzlik (11 June 1965 – 10 April 2010) was a Polish diplomat, the Undersecretary of State in the Office of the President of the Republic of Poland and since October, 2008 in charge of foreign policy.

Born on 11 June 1965 in Bielsko Biała; MA in sociology of international relations, School of Social Sciences, the Catholic University of Lublin, Poland. Prime Minister’s advisor on foreign policy (1992-1994); first secretary and counselor for political and military affairs at the Embassy of the Republic of Poland in Washington, DC (1994-2000); director of Export Policy Department (2000-2001), deputy director of Security Policy Department at the Ministry of Foreign Affairs (2001-2002); ambassador at large and chairman of the Missile Technology Control Regime /MTCR/, Paris (2002-2003); minister counselor for political affairs at the Mission of Poland to the United Nations in New York (2004- 2005 ); Head of the Office of Foreign Affairs in the Presidential Chancellery (2006-2008).

Postgraduate education at the School of Social Sciences at the University of Vienna, Austria; the University of Geneva, Switzerland; the University of Cranfield, United Kingdom and the Center of International Trade and Security at the University of Georgia, United States.

Traineeship in the Committee on Foreign Affairs of the House of Representatives and the US Senate Foreign Relations Committee of the US Congress; the United Nations Research Institute for Social Development (UNRISD) and the Permanent Delegation of the Republic of Poland to NATO

In 2000 awarded “the Medal for Outstanding Public Service” by the Secretary of Defense of the United States Department of Defense.

Father of three children: daughters - Julia and Iwona, son - Jan

He was listed on the flight manifest of the Tupolev Tu-154 of the 36th Special Aviation Regiment carrying the President of Poland Lech Kaczyński which crashed near Smolensk-North airport near Pechersk near Smolensk, Russia, on 10 April 2010, killing all aboard.

Handzlik befriended Polish war hero and Righteous Gentile Jan Karski in the latter's final years. The two men were playing chess on 13 July 2000, when Karski fell ill. Alarmed, Handzlik started to call an ambulance. Karski sternly responded: “Minister Handzlik, Check! Your move.” Karski perished soon after reaching the hospital. A statue of Karski playing chess now sits outside the Polish Consulate in New York City, with a copy installed on the Georgetown campus.

== Career ==
Handzlik also served as a lecturer at Collegium Civitas, a private Polish university in Warsaw. At the time of his death, he was teaching two courses at the school entitled "U.S. Foreign and Security Policy" and "Negotiations and Responsibility to Protect".

== Honours and awards ==
Commander's Cross of the Order of Polonia Restituta - 2010, posthumously
Secretary of Defense Medal for Outstanding Public Service - 2000, United States
Grand Officer of the Order of Merit - 2008, Portugal
National Order of Merit, Class III - 2009, Malta
Commander's Cross of the Order of Merit - 2009, Hungary
Commander's Cross of the Order of Merit (Lithuania) - 2009, Lithuania
