= 95th Evacuation Hospital =

U.S military hospital

The 95th Evacuation Hospital was a U.S. military hospital during World War II, the Vietnam War, and in Germany.

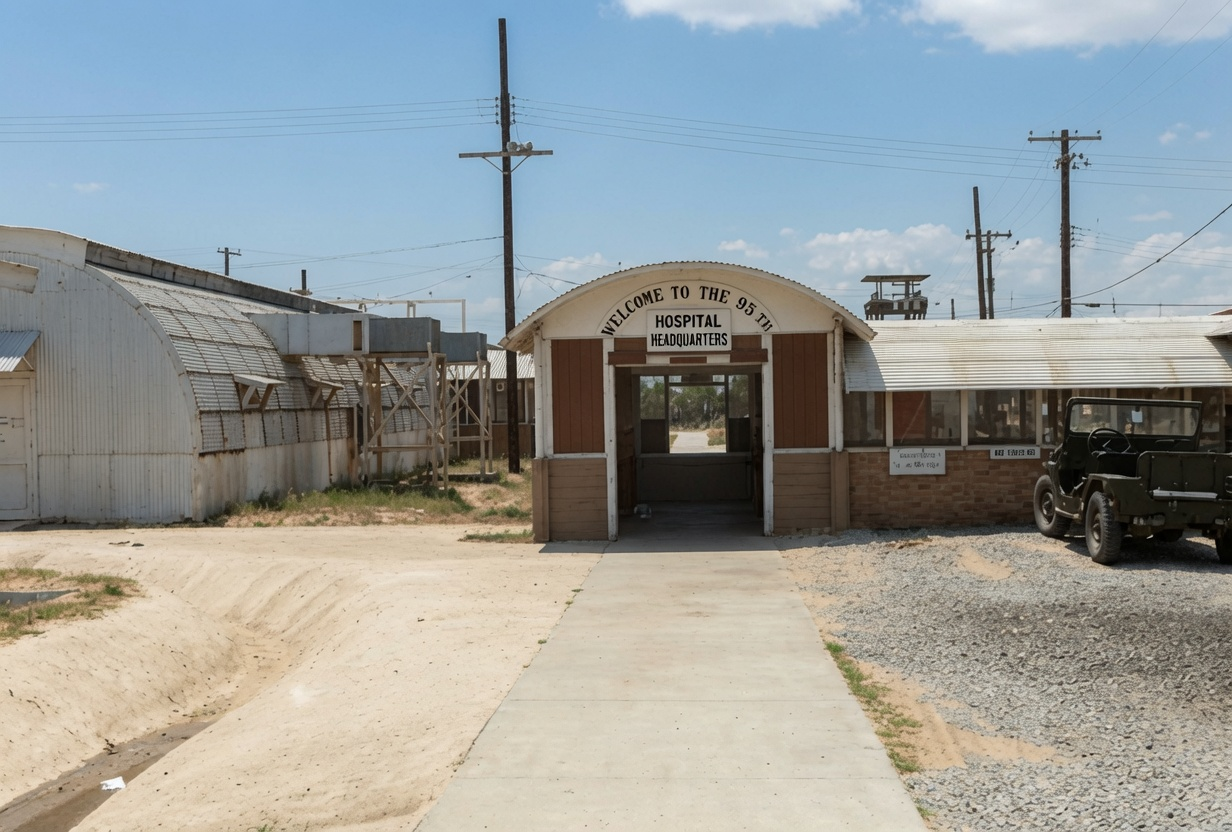
95th Evacuation Hospital Headquarters

== Background ==
The 95th Evacuation Hospital originally constituted as the 74th Surgical Hospital 21 December 1928. It was activated at Fort Warren, Cheyenne, Wyoming, 1 June 1941. The hospital was then reorganized and re-designated as the 95th Evacuation Hospital 14 August 1942. It was inactivated at Camp Kilmer, New Jersey, 3 December 1954.

The 95th Evacuation Hospital was again activated on 26 March 1963 and inactivated in South Vietnam 28 March 1973.

The 95th Evacuation Hospital was activated in Heidelberg, Germany on 15 November 1994.

== World War II ==
During World War II the 95th Evacuation Hospital operated as a 400-bed mobile hospital. The unit was staffed with approximately 40 doctors, 40 nurses, and 220 enlisted men. During operations in Morocco, Algiers, and Italy, it was attached to the U.S. Fifth Army and to the U.S. Seventh Army while operating in France and Germany.

When the 95th Evacuation Hospital landed in Italy 9 September 1943, it was the first U.S. hospital established on the European continent in World War II. In addition to Salerno, the hospital made two other amphibious landings (Anzio and Southern France).

The 95th Evacuation Hospital achieved national recognition at Anzio when, on 7 February 1944, a German plane dropped a load of fragmentation bombs on the hospital in an effort to evade two British planes, rendering the hospital inoperable, killing 28 people, and wounding an additional 60. Among the dead were two officers, three nurses, 16 enlisted men, a Red Cross worker, and two other personnel.

As a result, the 95th was sent to the then-static Cassino front where it was re-staffed and re-equipped.

== Vietnam War ==
As part of the buildup for operations in South Vietnam, the 95th was reactivated 26 March 1963 at Fort Benning, Georgia and alerted for overseas movement. The unit's advance team arrived at the proposed site of the hospital at Red Beach Base Area near Danang on 20 March 1968. By the time that the USNS Geiger arrived with the unit's equipment and the majority of its personnel six days later, the members of this advance team had completed a design plan for the site and begun construction of an access road with assistance from the Seabees. The initial phase of construction included the preparation of defensive fortifications, perimeter wire and tentage for billets. During the initial phase the unit provided its own mess, electrical power, potable water and hospital laundry facilities.

By 1 April, the vertical construction was initiated consisting of two-by-four frames for tent wards. Factored into the initial construction was the directive to ensure proper surgical conditions in the tropics for patients with traumatic injuries. There was some uncertainty. By conserving construction resources, the unit was able to construct a tropical structure suitable for air-conditioning.

Despite supply shipping delays, construction of the first 100 beds was completed by 10 April. By 30 April, the hospital was 99 percent filled, and additional beds were rapidly being added. On 8 May, 300 beds were reported operational. May 27 saw a 400-bed hospital with a census of 240 and an experience of a total of 320 medical patients, 941 surgical patients and 1058 outpatients, with a total of 1261 admission and 1021 dispositions. Seven hundred and fifty-nine of these patients were not from transfer by direct admissions, and the facility was operating as a surgical as well as an evacuation hospital. Hospital personnel adapted, finding that the combined operation of a tent evacuation hospital and a Medical Unit, Self-contained, Transportable (MUST) operating room was feasible.

During the following month the unit was continually harassed by Vietcong action in the nearby areas requiring the personnel to put in arduous 12-hour shifts of patient care and then sleep or stand watch on the perimeter during off-hours. By the end of June, the hospital had experienced an additional 1215 admissions and 1188 outpatients for a total of 2476 admissions in the first 63 days of operation.

Not only was it necessary for the staff to build and run this tent hospital, they were also required to use their spare time to visit a new site under construction on My Khe Beach between Camp Tien Sha and Marble Mountain Air Facility. Offering advice, they helped plan the future move of their respective sections onto the new site (a move that was scheduled to start by 4 July). By the last week of June, Red Beach personnel were reduced to a minimum. The patient census was also reduced as low as the situation would allow.

The actual move began with one third of the staff moving to the new site from 4–5 July. The remainder of the staff then moved approximately 60 patients. By the evening of 7 July, the hospital reported 323 beds operational.

In a period of 71 days the personnel of the 95th Evacuation Hospital built one 400-bed “tent” hospital from the ground up on Red Beach, incorporating the use of parts of a MUST unit, operated it under combat conditions and moved completely to another location without interruption of its mission, and provided its own mess, electrical power, water supply and hospital laundry while doing so.

The 95th Evacuation Hospital (Smbl) was a 320-bed air conditioned facility offering area medical support to U.S. Military units without organic medical support in the area around Da Nang, Vietnam. The hospital also provided medical care to the Free World Military Assistance Forces and civilian war casualties. The range of professional capabilities available (including four full-time dispensaries and Neurology, Dermatology, Special Radiologic Procedures, Oral Surgery, Psychiatric Consultations, Orthopedic Surgery, Neuro—Surgery, General Surgery Services) made the 95th Evacuation Hospital a referral center for difficult and sophisticated cases in Northern Military Region I. Active “on the job” training in all specialties of medicine was performed by medical corps officers and Vietnamese physicians as well. Medical, surgical and consultative assistance was provided to the Duy—Ton and Provincial Hospital of Da Nang on a regular basis.

The hospital was used as the basis for the fictional 510th Evacuation Hospital in the American television series China Beach.

== Timeline ==
- August 14, 1942 – Fort Warren, Wyoming, 74th Surgical Hospital re-designated 95th Evacuation Hospital
- September 19, 1942 – Camp Breckinridge, Morganfield, Kentucky
- April 2, 1943 – Camp Shanks, Orangeburg, New York
- April 15, 1943 – Departed New York Harbor for North Africa aboard the USS Mariposa
- April 24, 1943 – Casablanca, Morocco
- May 24, 1943 – Oujda, Morocco
- July 7, 1943 – Unit commendation
- July 8, 1943 – Ain el Turck, Algeria in support of Operation Husky (Sicily)
- September 5, 1943 – Departed Oran, Algeria, aboard the Dutch ship Marnix
- September 9, 1943 – Landed Paestum, Italy, Operation Avalanche, D-day +H-11
- October 9, 1943 – Naples, Italy
- November 28, 1943 – Capua, Italy
- January 8, 1944 – Departed Capua for Caserta, in preparation for Operation Shingle
- January 17, 1944 – Unit commendation
- January 23, 1944 – Boarded LST #163, for Anzio, Italy, Green Beach, D-day +1
- January 31, 1944 – Nettuno, Italy
- February 7, 1944 – Bombing killed 26, wounded 60, rendered hospital nonfunctional
- February 11, 1944 – Riardo (Cassino), Italy
- March 13, 1944 – Carinola, Italy
- April 10, 1944 – Unit commendation
- May 23, 1944 – Itri, Italy
- June 1, 1944 – Cori (Cisterna), Italy
- June 13, 1944 – Montalto di Castro, Italy
- July 16–18, 1944 – Sparanise, Italy, Operation Dragoon
- August 12, 1944 – Departed Pozzuoli, Italy, aboard 2 LCIs (#188 and an unknown)
- August 14, 1944 – Ajaccio, Corsica
- August 15, 1944 – Cavalaire, France, D-Day H-8
- August 17, 1944 – Cogolin, France, not in operation
- August 18, 1944 – Gonfaron, France
- August 28–31, 1944 – Closed, awaiting movement orders and transportation
- September 3, 1944 – Beaumont (Beaumont-de-Aspre)
- September 5, 1944 – St. Amour, France
- September 20, 1944 – Saulx, France
- October 9, 1944 – Epinal (Renauvoid), France
- November 1944 – Epinal (Golbey), France
- December 6, 1944 – Mutzig, France
- January 3, 1945 – Epinal (Golbey), France
- January 3, 1945 – Mutzig, France
- January 8, 1945 – Departed for Sarrebourg, France
- March 29, 1945 – Bensheim, Germany
- April 8, 1945 – Kist, Germany
- April 29, 1945 – Ebermergen, Germany
- Late May–June (possibly after May 21) – Bretton, Germany

== Personnel ==
Commanding Officers: Col. Paul K. Sauer, Lt. Col. Hubert L. Binkley (commander after Sauer was wounded in the 7 February bombing.) Chief of Surgical Service Lt. Col. Grantley W. Taylor, Chief of Medical Service Col. William Comess, Laboratory and Pharmacy Officer Capt. Harry J. Schneider, X-ray Officer Capt. Mario C. Gian, Chief of Dental Services Major Lewis A Imerman, Chief Anesthetist Capt. Marshall A. Bauer, Principal Chief Nurse Capt. Evelyn E. Swanson.

== Battles and campaigns ==
- Naples-Foggia (Operation Avalanche)
- Rome-Arno (Operation Shingle)
- Southern France (Operation Dragoon)
- Germany (Rhineland)
- Central Europe

== Decorations ==
- Meritorious Unit Commendation European Theater
- Meritorious Unit Award Vietnam 1970-71

Air Force "Outstanding Unit Award with Valor" Vietnam 1972-1973

== See also ==
- List of former United States Army medical units
