= Intralytix =

Biotechnology company based in Maryland, US

- Company type: Private
- Industry: Biotechnology
- Founded: 1998
- Headquarters: Columbia, Maryland, United States
- Key people: Alexander Sulakvelidze (President and CEO)
- Products: Bacteriophage cocktails

Intralytix, Inc. is a privately owned biotech venture incorporated in the State of Maryland on July 28, 1998. Intralytix specializes in bacteriophage based products used to control bacterial pathogens in environmental, agricultural, food processing, and medical (including skin care and oral care) settings.

== Company Background ==
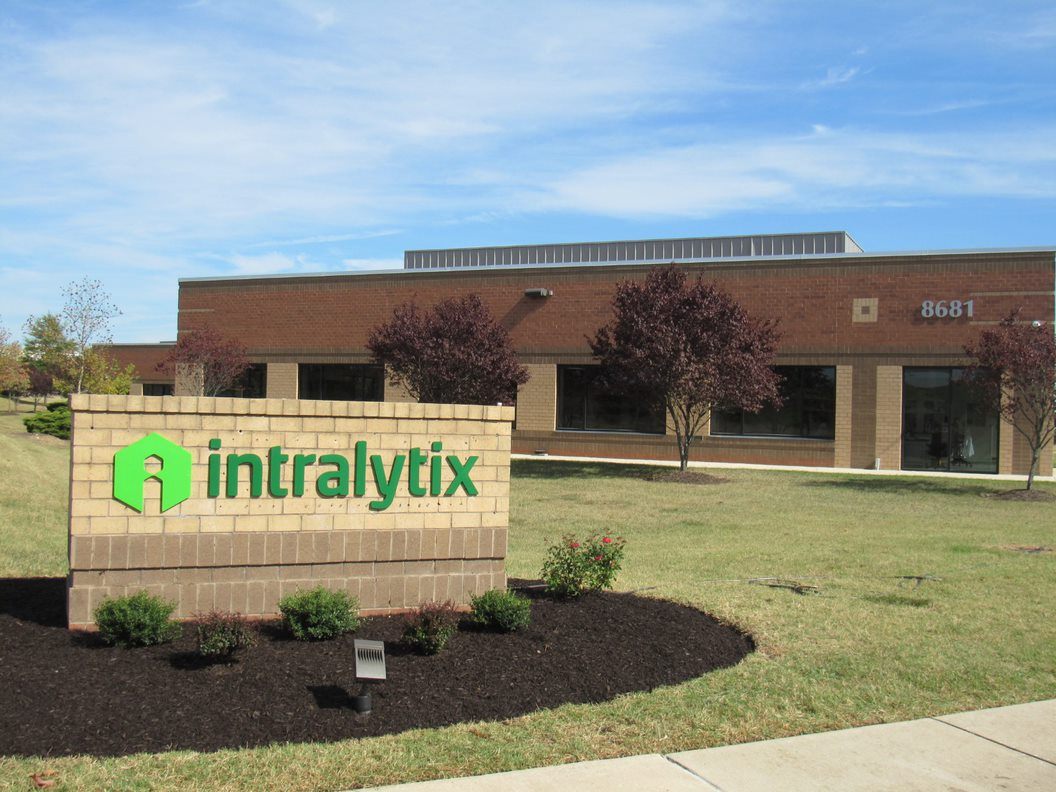
Intralytix Headquarters

Intralytix was founded in 1998 in Baltimore, Maryland, by Drs. John Glenn Morris Jr. and Alexander Sulakvelidze together with a group of other scientists and business professionals. The platform technology of Intralytix is based on using naturally occurring, non-genetically modified (non-GMO) lytic bacteriophages for developing "green" commercial products for a variety of applications. These products are all-natural, antibiotic-free ways to control disease-causing bacterial pathogens.

== Major Milestones ==
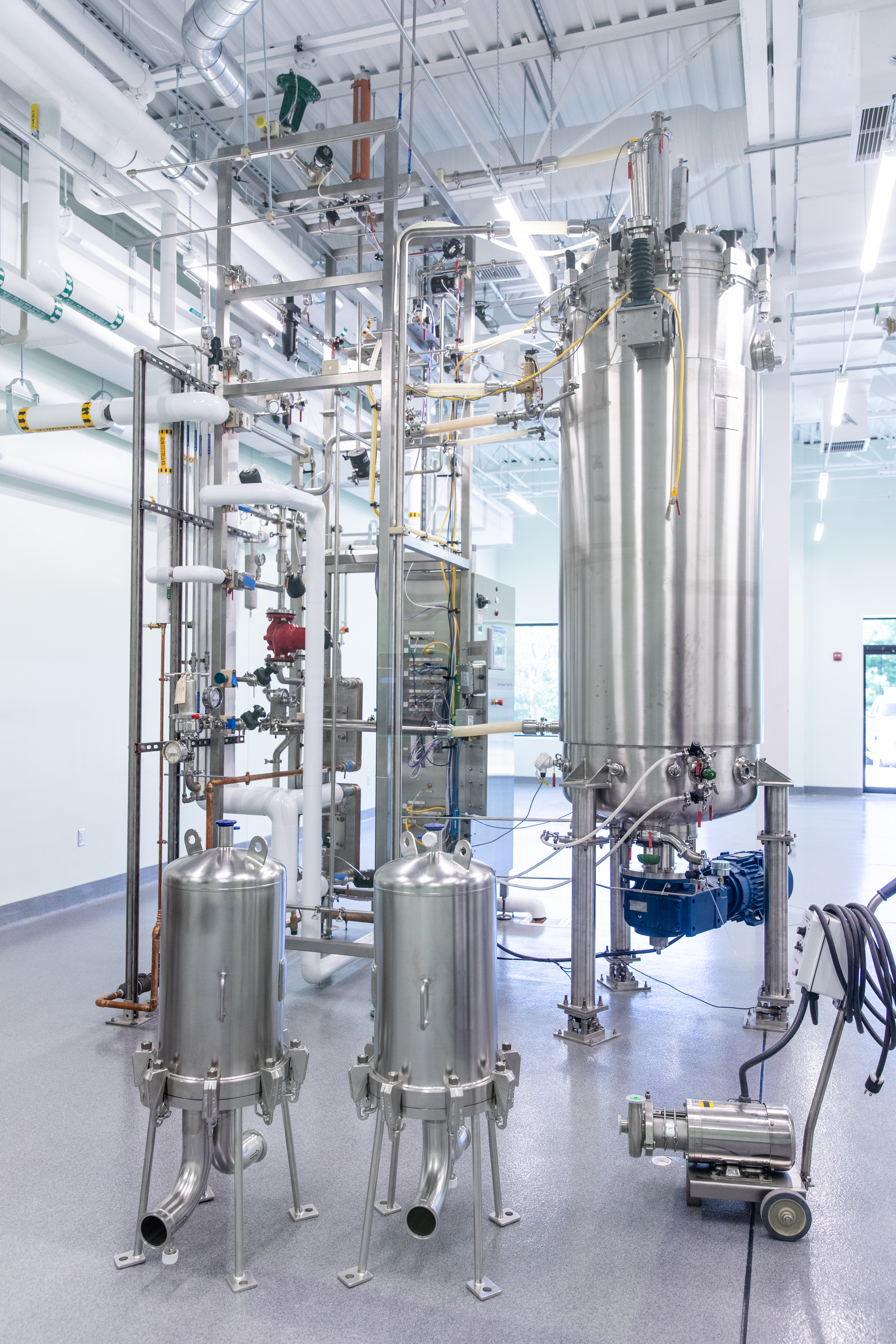
Fermentation Suite

In 2006, Intralytix was the first company in the world to receive FDA/USDA approval for a bacteriophage-based food safety product, ListShield.

That same year, Intralytix was also the first company in the world to successfully assemble a Master Drug File (MDF) application with the FDA, and to manufacture and supply its phage product for the first-ever in the US human clinical trial when phages were used to treat infected venous ulcers.

In 2018, Intralytix was granted the first FDA-approved IND for a double-blind, randomized, placebo-controlled clinical trial in the US for an orally administered phage preparation in patients with inactive Crohn's disease (NCT03808103).

As of 2022, Intralytix has the largest number of commercial FDA-approved phage food safety products with five FDA- and USDA-approved bacteriophage-based food safety products.

As of 2022, Intralytix is the largest commercial manufacturer of phage products for food safety applications in the US with a successful scale-up to a 1,500 L fermenter.

In 2024, Intralytix received the highly coveted Safe Quality Food (SQF) certification for food manufacturing. This comprehensive Hazard Analysis and Critical Control Points (HACCP)-based food safety and quality management certification sets Intralytix apart as the first and so far, the only bacteriophage company in history to attain such certification

== Intralytix Facilities ==
Intralytix is located at 8681 Robert Fulton Drive, Columbia MD 21046, US. The 33,000-square-foot building has production facilities with capabilities for:

- High-throughput robotic system for phage discovery and characterization;
- Long-term cryogenic storage of hundreds of phages and thousands of bacteria strain stocks;
- Manufacturing and production of phages in 1,500 L fermentation vessels with room to expand;
- Customized large volume phage product mixing;
- Commercial scale spray drying capabilities;
- And, high-throughput automatic filling.

== Pioneer in Food Safety ==
The first commercial bacteriophage food safety product developed was ListShield, which targets Listeria monocytogenes contamination of foods. It received FDA/USDA approval in 2006. Two years later, ListShield was approved for use as an environmental decontaminant (e.g., for decontaminating inanimate surfaces in food processing facilities) by the Environmental Protection Agency (EPA) (EPA registration #74234-1). In 2010, Intralytix began large-scale commercial sales of ListShield to the food industry.

Other phage-based food safety phage products followed. In 2011, Intralytix received regulatory clearance from the FDA for its EcoShield food safety product effective against E. coli O157:H7 (FCN No. 1018) specific for the use of EcoShield on red meat parts and trim intended to be ground. In the same year, EcoShield received regulatory clearance from the USDA's Food Safety & Inspection Service (FSIS) for use on red meat to be ground and was determined to constitute an incidental aid that will not require labeling (i.e., "clean label").

Subsequent phage preparations received regulatory clearance from the FDA through Generally Recognized As Safe (GRAS) acknowledgments. SalmoFresh, which is used to target Salmonella contamination, was declared GRAS in 2013 (GRN No. 435); ShigaShield, used to treat Shigella, received clearance by the FDA in 2017 (GRN No. 000672); and CampyShield, which is used to target Campylobacter contamination, was declared GRAS in October 2021 (GRN No. 000966). As of January 2023, Intralytix has five FDA- and USDA-approved bacteriophage-based food safety products on the market. This is the largest number of FDA-approved phage food safety products for any company worldwide.

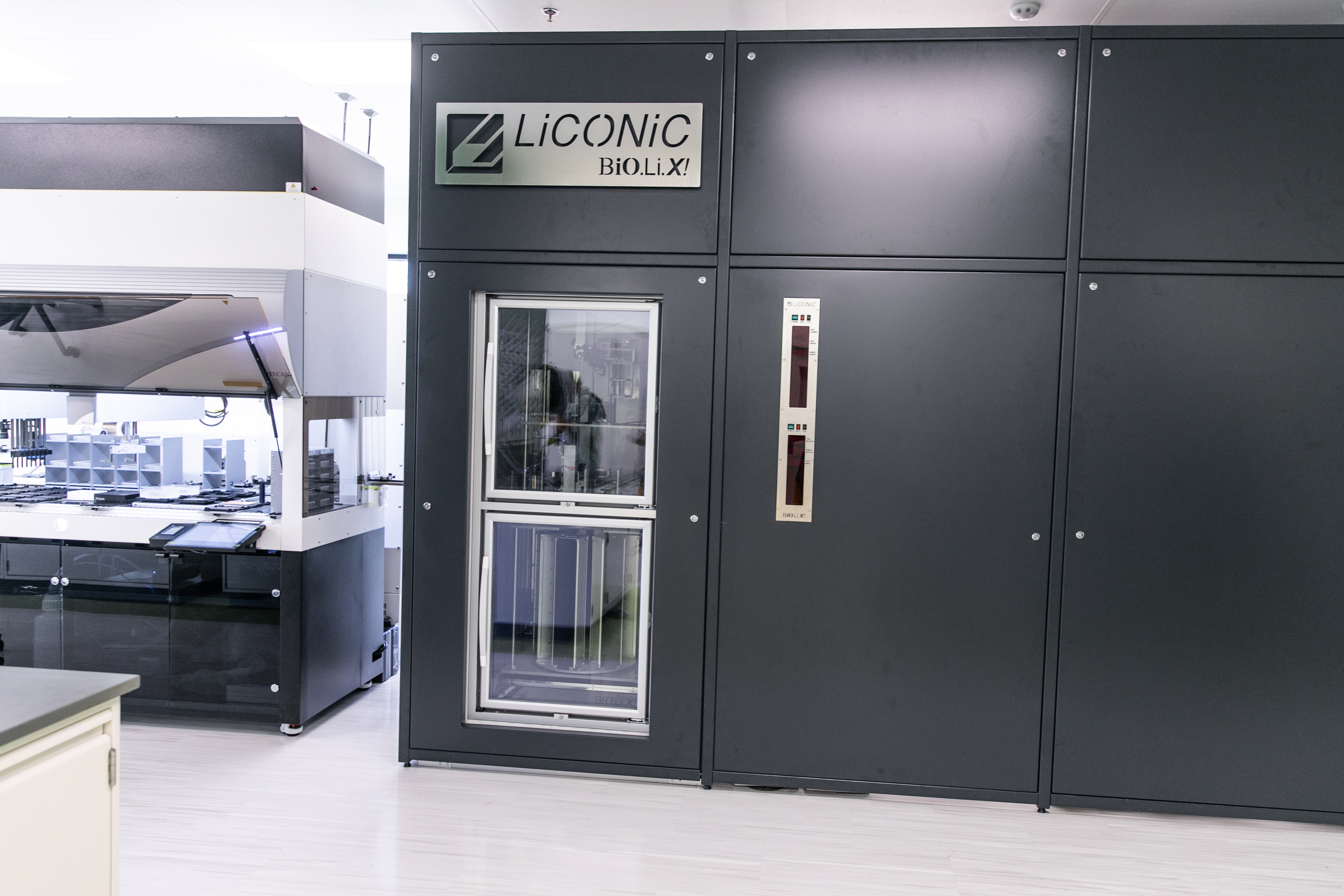
Robotic platform allows long-term storage and testing of thousands of phages and bacteria.

== Expansion into Human Therapeutics ==
In addition to its line of food safety products, Intralytix is a world leader in human health applications for phage products. It has several all-natural, antibiotic-free phage-based products capable of treating human diseases of bacterial origin in various stages of development (preclinical through Phase 2a). In 2006, under Intralytix's MDF and an investigator-initiated IND at the Southwest Regional Wound Care Center in Lubbock, Texas, Intralytix was the first company in the US to perform a first-in-human clinical trial where phages were used to treat infected venous ulcers.

The company is currently sponsoring a Phase 1/2a clinical trial (under an IND approval from the FDA) of the EcoActive phage preparation for targeting adherent-invasive E. coli associated with Crohn's disease (NCT03808103). This trial is currently enrolling patients at the Icahn School of Medicine at the Mount Sinai Hospital in New York, NY and at the Johns Hopkins University in Baltimore, MD. The trial is expected to be completed in late 2024.

In May 2020, Intralytix received a multimillion-dollar grant (AI 148054) from the National Institute of Allergy and Infectious Diseases (NIAID), National Institutes of Health (NIH), for the clinical development of its bacteriophage therapy preparation, ShigActive, for managing infections caused by the bacterial pathogen Shigella. These Phase 1/2a studies began in February 2023 (NCT05182749). Phase 1 trial was completed in March 2023, and Phase 2a trial is expected to commence in November 2023.

Also in Q3 2023, the company plans to begin clinical trials of another human therapeutic product, VRELysin, to treat Vancomycin Resistant Enterococci (NCT05715619).

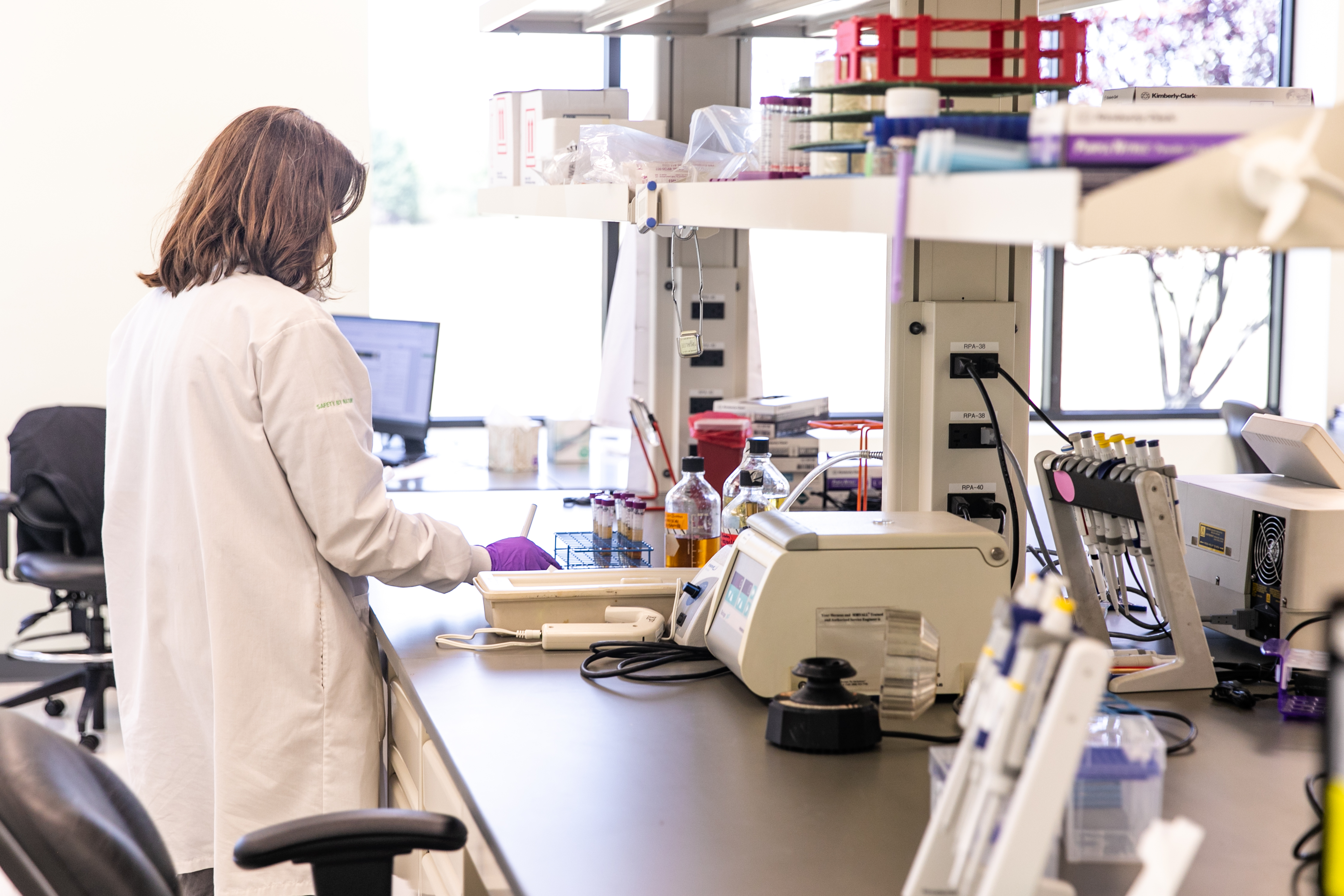
Intralytix scientist

== Awards and recognition ==
- 2006 – Intralytix wins the Popular Science magazine's "Best of What's New" award for its food safety product ListShield.

== Intellectual Property (IP) Portfolio ==
Intralytix is headed by Dr. Alexander Sulakvelidze, President and chief executive officer.

Intralytix's patent strategy is based on a multi-pronged approach, which provides broad and strong protection ranging from protecting specific bacteriophages that serve as the cornerstone of various company products to methods and applications of those bacteriophages in various settings. As of 2022, Intralytix has:

- 15 issued/allowed patents;
- Several pending patent applications worldwide.

== Intralytix Products ==
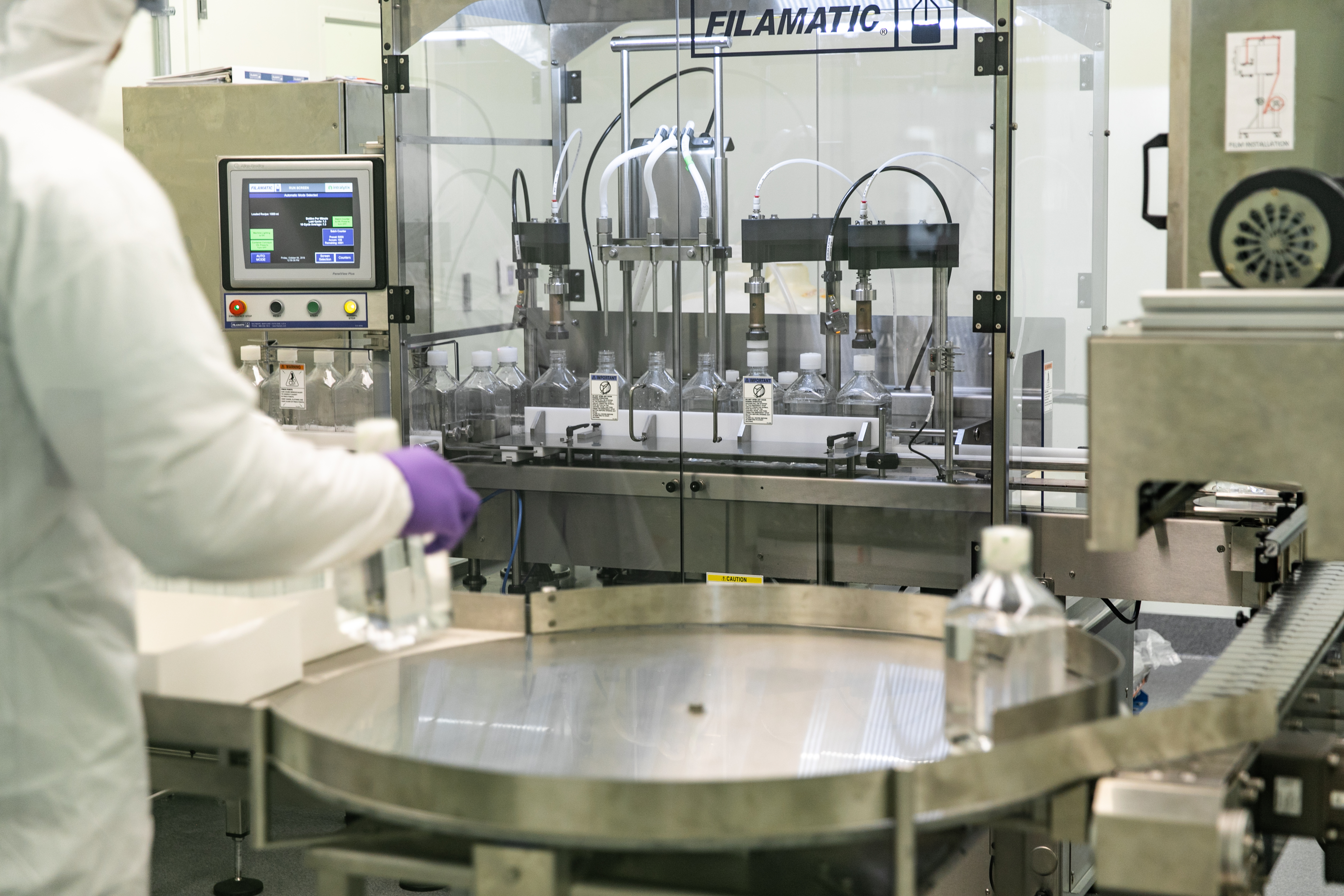
Phage production

=== Food Safety Products ===
These phage-based products are designed to be applied to food before, during, or after processing or packaging, as appropriate. They work by targeting and killing specific human (including animal) pathogenic bacteria that may be present in food. These products do not alter the color, taste, or smell of food in any way.

- CampyShield targets Campylobacter jejuni and Campylobacter coli which cause campylobacteriosis. Used to treat raw red med (e.g., whole carcasses, primal and subprimal, etc.) and raw poultry.
- ListShield targets Listeria monocytogenes which causes listeriosis. Used to treat ready-to-eat foods (e.g., meat, cheese, and fish), raw meats, fruits, and vegetables.
- SalmoFresh targets most common, highly pathogenic Salmonella enterica serotypes. Used to treat poultry products, fish, shellfish, fresh and processed fruits and vegetables, and ready-to-eat and raw red meat carcasses and parts and trimmings.
- ShigaShield targets Shigella strains responsible for the majority of foodborne disease, including S. flexneri, S. sonnei, and S. dysenteriae. Used to treat ready-to-eat meats, fish and shellfish, fresh and processed fruits, fresh and processed vegetables, and dairy products.
- EcoShield PX targets E. coli O157:H7 and Shiga toxin-producing E. coli (STEC). Used to treat various foods including beef and ground beef, chicken, fish, and fruits and vegetables.
- Ecolicide targets E. coli O157:H7 in pet food.
- SalmoLyse targets S. enterica in pet food.
- ListPhage targets L. monocytogenes in pet food.

=== Pre-Harvest Intervention Products ===
These food safety-related products are designed to be applied to live animals prior to entering the processing facility, through spray application to the animals' hide, skin, or feathers. After application, the phages act to reduce the contamination of specific target bacteria, if present on the animal, and prevent it from entering the facility.

- Ecolicide PX targets E. coli O157:H7 contamination on the hides of live animals.

=== Therapeutic Products ===
- ShigActive targets Shigella species. ShigActive has been shown to be efficacious in mice. In 2020, Intralytix was awarded a clinical trial grant by NIAID to assess the safety and efficacy of ShigActive for the management of shigellosis (AI 148054).
- EcoActive targets adherent-invasive E. coli (AIEC) associated with inflammation in Crohn's disease. A Phase 1/2a clinical trial is currently enrolling at the Mount Sinai Hospital in New York, NY and at the Johns Hopkins University in Baltimore, MD. (ClinicalTrials.gov Identifier: NCT03808103).
- VRELysin targets vancomycin-resistant Enterococcus (VRE), which in turn, may prevent subsequent infection as well as nosocomial spread (NCT05715619). A Phase 1/2a clinical trial is expected to start in Q3 2023.
