= Zohar Palti =

Israeli defense public servant

- זהר פלטי
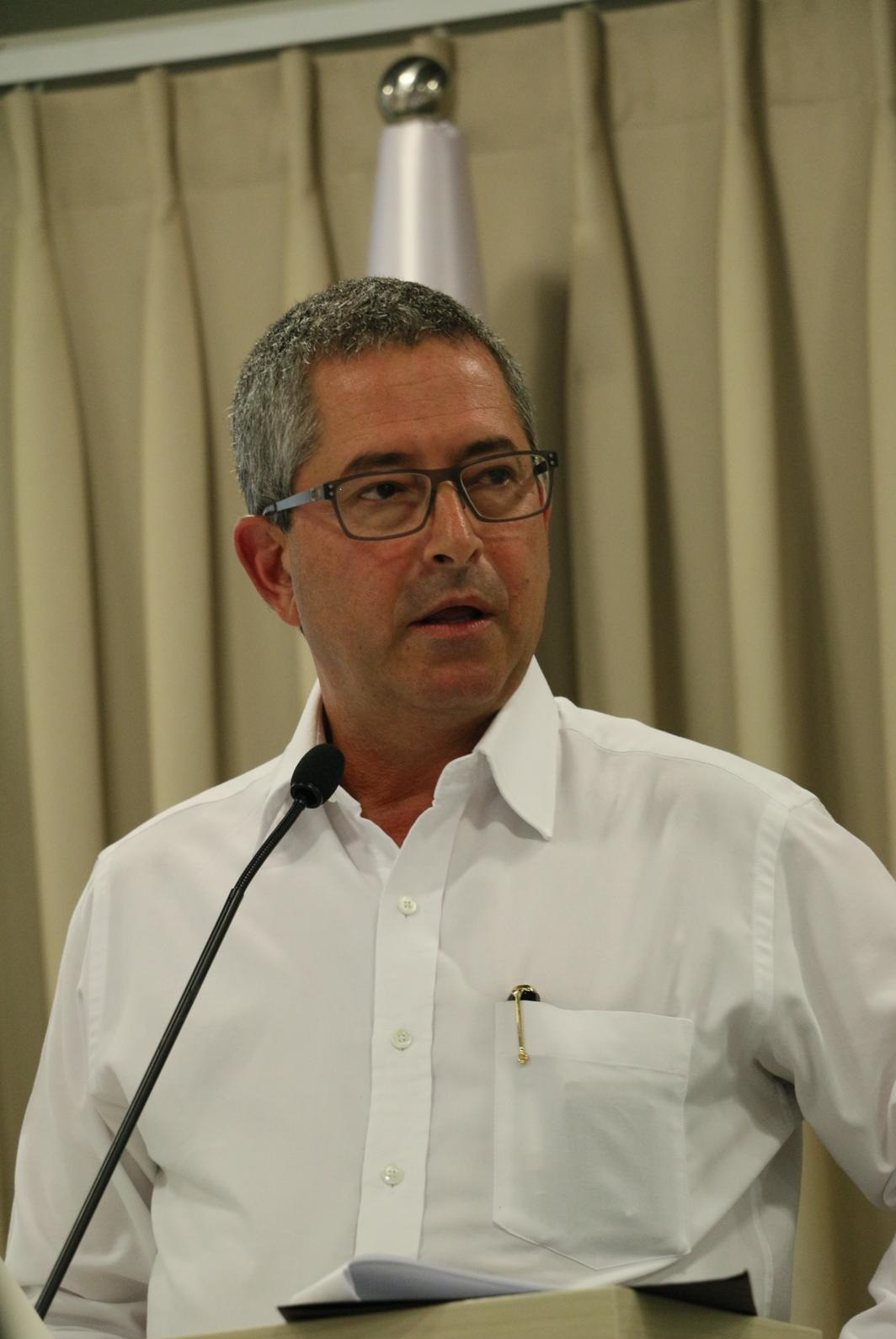
- Born: 1964 (age 61–62); Tel Aviv, Israel
- Education: Tel Aviv University (BA, MA); National Defense University (Advanced Management Program)
- Occupations: Intelligence officer; Former head of the Political-Military Bureau
- Military career
- Allegiance: Israel
- Branch: IDF Intelligence Corps; Mossad
- Service years: 1982–2016
- Rank: Colonel
- Conflicts: Syrian Civil War; Iranian nuclear program
- Other work: Senior research fellow at Harvard's Belfer Center

Head of the Political-Military Bureau
- Incumbent
- Assumed office February 2017
- Minister: Avigdor Liberman

Zohar Palti (Hebrew: זהר פלטי; born 1964) was head of the Political-Military Bureau at Israel's Ministry of Defense. He previously served as the head of the Mossad's intelligence directorate, as well as deputy head of the Research Division in the IDF Intelligence Corps at the rank of colonel.

== Early life and education ==
Palti was born in Tel Aviv and was raised in Ramat HaSharon, where he studied at the "Rutberg" High School. In 1982 he was drafted into the IDF Intelligence Corps. During his service, he served as an intelligence officer in the Golani Infantry Brigade, chief-of staff to then-deputy IDF chief of staff, Major General Matan Vilnai, intelligence officer in the Judea and Samaria Division, and head of Counter Terrorism arena in the IDF Intelligence Corps. In his final IDF posting, Palti served as deputy head of the Intelligence Corps' Research Division.

== Career ==
In 2006, Palti began working at the Mossad intelligence agency at the request of then-director, Meir Dagan, who appointed him head of the Counter Terrorism division within the organization's intelligence branch. In 2010, he was appointed head of the Mossad's strategic research division. In 2011, he was appointed by then-director Tamir Pardo as head of the intelligence directorate.

Palti's tenure as head of the Mossad's intelligence directorate was characterized by Israel and its intelligence community facing a wave of threats and challenges including revolutions across the Arab world, the Syrian Civil War, and the Iranian nuclear program.

In 2016, Palti finished his tenure and went on to be a senior research fellow at Harvard's Belfer Center. In February 2017, a professional committee, chaired by Ministry of Defense Director General, Gen. (res.) Udi Adam, recommended that Palti be selected to serve as head of the ministry's Political-Military Bureau. Minister of Defense Avigdor Liberman approved the recommendation.

Palti has BA and Executive MA in Middle-Eastern studies from Tel Aviv University, with honorary distinction. He is a graduate of the National Defense University's Advanced Management program, and was a research fellow at the Washington Institute for Near East Policy in Washington, DC. Palti was also a Reccanati-Kaplan senior fellow at Harvard's Belfer Center for Science and International Affairs.

== Personal life ==
Palti is married and has two children.
