= Pediatrics International =

- Discipline: pediatrics
- Language: English
- Edited by: Norikazu Shimizu

Publication details
- Former name(s): Acta Paediatrica Japonica
- Publisher: Wiley-Blackwell (Japan)
- Open access: yes
- Impact factor: 0.939 (2018)

Standard abbreviations
- ISO 4: Pediatr. Int.

Indexing
- ISSN: 1442-200X
- OCLC no.: 299336103

Links
- Journal homepage

Pediatrics International is a peer reviewed journal for pediatrics, published in English by the Japan Pediatrics Society.
