= 93rd Evacuation Hospital (United States) =

The 93rd Evacuation Hospital was a make-over of the 61st Surgical Hospital and operated through World War II, Vietnam, and the Gulf War.

== World War II ==
The 61st Surgical Hospital was a 100-bed field hospital. It was converted in 1942 to a 400-bed semi-mobile evacuation hospital with a staff of 40 doctors, 43 nurses, and 6 administrative officers and organized as the 93rd Evacuation Hospital (Motorized).

=== Timeline ===
- 1942–1943 – Training at Fort Meade, Maryland
- April 1943 – Embarkation at Camp Shanks, Orangeberg, New York
- April 15, 1943 – Depart for North Africa aboard USS Mariposa
- April 23, 1943 – Arrival at Casablanca, Morocco
- May 1943 – Relocated by train to Oran, Algeria at Camp Goat Hill
- June 1943 – Tizi, Algeria
- July 1943 – Palm Beach, Algiers, Algeria
- July 13, 1943 – Gela, Sicily in Operation Husky
- July 25, 1943 – Pretralia, Sicily
- August 1943 – San Stephano, Sicily
- September 15, 1943 – Paestum, Italy
- October 2, 1943 – Montella, Italy
- October 1943 – Avellino, Italy
- October 24, 1943 – January 9, 1944 – Piano de Ciazzo, Italy
- January 1944 – Naples, Italy
- January 23, 1944 – Anzio, Italy as part of Operation Shingle
- January 29, 1944 – Nattuna, Italy with the U.S. 95th Evacuation Hospital
- April 17, 1944 – Caserta, Italy
- Additional locations in Italy
- August 9, 1944 – Naples, Italy and embark
- August 15, 1944 – Operation Dragoon D-Day H-6 landing St Maxime, France
- Additional locations in France
- Ardennes, France - Battle of the Bulge
- December 19, 1944 – Bischwiller, Germany
- April, 1945 - Dachau Concentration Camp
- May 8 - July 8, 1945 - Germany
- December 12, 1945 - Camp Kilmer, New Jersey, Inactivated

=== Personnel ===
- Colonel Currier, Commanding Officer
- Major Thompson, Executive Officer
- Major Franklin Weimar Fry, Chief of Medicine and Registrar
- Chaplain McMillan
- Lt. D'Imperio
- Major Etter, Evacuation Officer
- Joseph William Genelius, Medic, Technician Five
- Jeanne A. Carter Wells, Nurse, First Lieutenant
- Cleo A. Dupy, Corporal
- Dr. Quinby DeHart Gurnee

=== Operations and Battles ===
Operation Husky
Operation Shingle
Operation Dragoon
Battle of the Bulge
Colmar Pocket

== Vietnam War ==
The 93rd Evacuation Hospital was established at Long Binh Post in December 1965.

In mid-April 1971 the facility was closed and the unit returned to the U.S. at the end of April. During its time in South Vietnam, the hospital treated 73,023 patients, including 9,353 battle casualties.

== See also ==
- List of former United States Army medical units
