= Charles A. Blanchard (lawyer) =

American lawyer (born 1959)

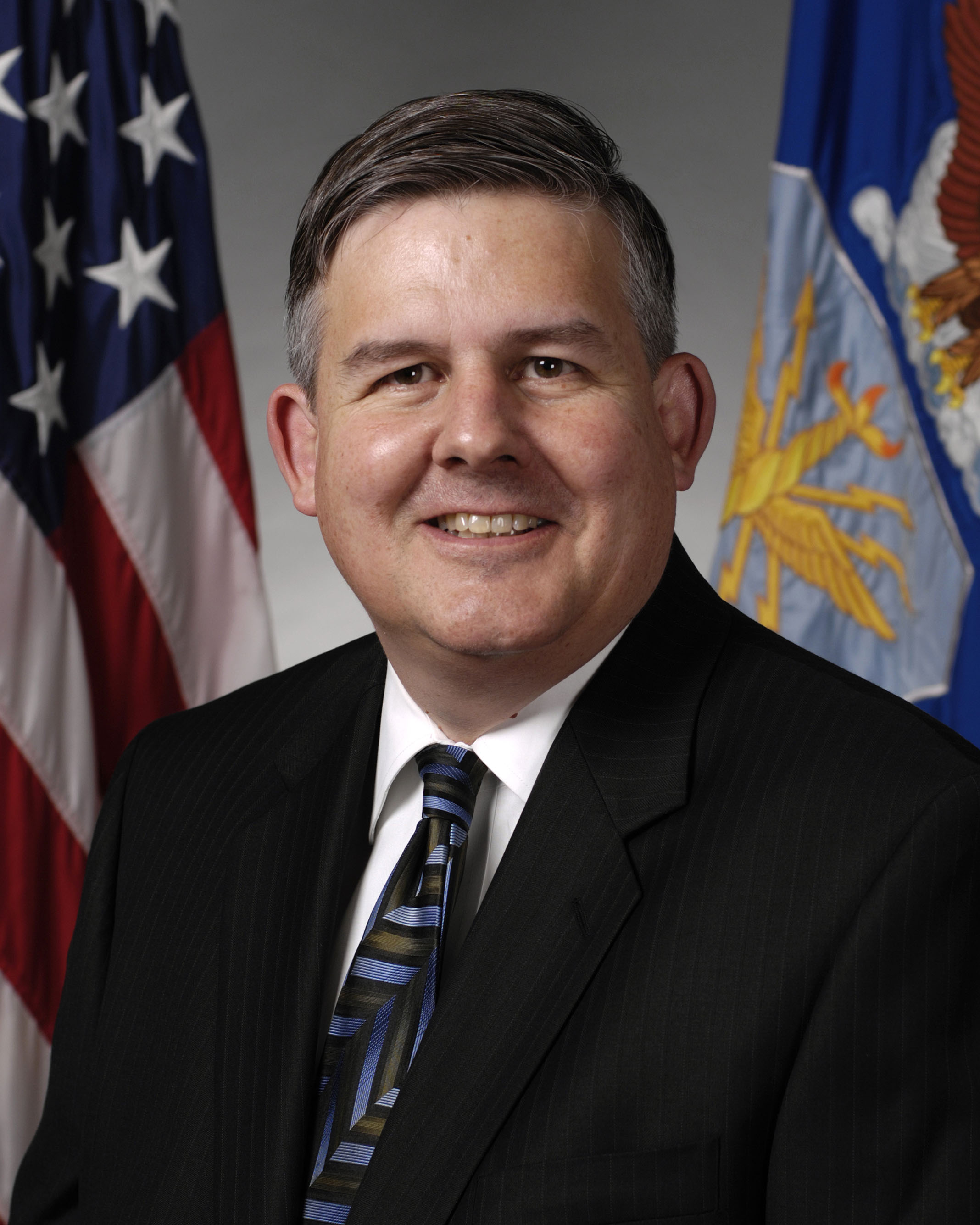
Blanchard, circa 2009

Charles Alan Blanchard (born April 14, 1959) is a United States lawyer who served as General Counsel of the Army from 1999 to 2001, and who has served as General Counsel of the Air Force, from 2009 to 2013.

== Biography ==
Charles A. Blanchard was born in San Diego, California in 1959. Raised in Oregon, he graduated from Sprague High School in Salem, Oregon in 1977. Blanchard was educated at Lewis & Clark College, receiving a B.S. in Chemistry in 1981. He then attended Harvard Law School and the John F. Kennedy School of Government, where he obtained his J.D. and M.P.P. degrees in 1985. Blanchard then became a law clerk to Judge Harry T. Edwards of the United States Court of Appeals for the District of Columbia Circuit (1985-1986) and Justice Sandra Day O'Connor of the Supreme Court of the United States (1986-1987).

In 1987, Blanchard joined the United States Office of the Independent Counsel as an Associate Independent Counsel. The next year, he joined the law firm of Brown and Bain in Phoenix, Arizona as a partner; the firm has since merged with Perkins Coie.

Blanchard left Brown and Bain in 1997 to become Chief Legal Counsel of the Office of National Drug Control Policy. In 1999, President of the United States Bill Clinton nominated him to be General Counsel of the Army and he subsequently held that office from 1999 to 2001. He then returned to his practice at Brown and Bain in Phoenix (which merged with Perkins Coie in 2004). In 2009, President Barack Obama nominated him to be General Counsel of the Air Force and he held that office from 2009 to 2013. Subsequently, Blanchard joined the law firm Arnold & Porter working in their government contracts and national security groups.

In the 2024 United States presidential election, Blanchard endorsed Kamala Harris.

== See also ==
- List of law clerks for the eighth seat of the Supreme Court of the United States

Government offices
Preceded by William Thaddeus Coleman III	General Counsel of the Army; 1999 – 2001	Succeeded by Steven J. Morello
Preceded by Mary L. Walker	General Counsel of the Air Force; 2009 – 2013	Succeeded by Gordon O. Tanner
