= Equal justice (disambiguation) =

Equal justice can refer to:

- Equal justice under law, a phrase engraved on the front of the United States Supreme Court building in Washington D.C. expressing a societal ideal that has influenced the American legal system
- Equal Justice (TV series), a television legal drama broadcast in the United States by ABC from March 27, 1990, to July 3, 1991
- Equal Justice with Judge Eboni K. Williams, a syndicated television court show that premiered in 2023
- Equal Justice Works, a Washington, DC-based nonprofit organization that focuses on careers in public service for lawyers
- Equal Justice Initiative, a non-profit organization, based in Montgomery, Alabama, that provides legal representation to prisoners who may have been wrongly convicted of crimes, poor prisoners, and others who may have been denied a fair trial
- Equal Justice for United States Military Personnel legislation, federal legislation to allow members of the United States Armed Forces to appeal court-martial convictions
