= Frank Millard =

American politician and football player (1892–1976)

Frank G. Millard
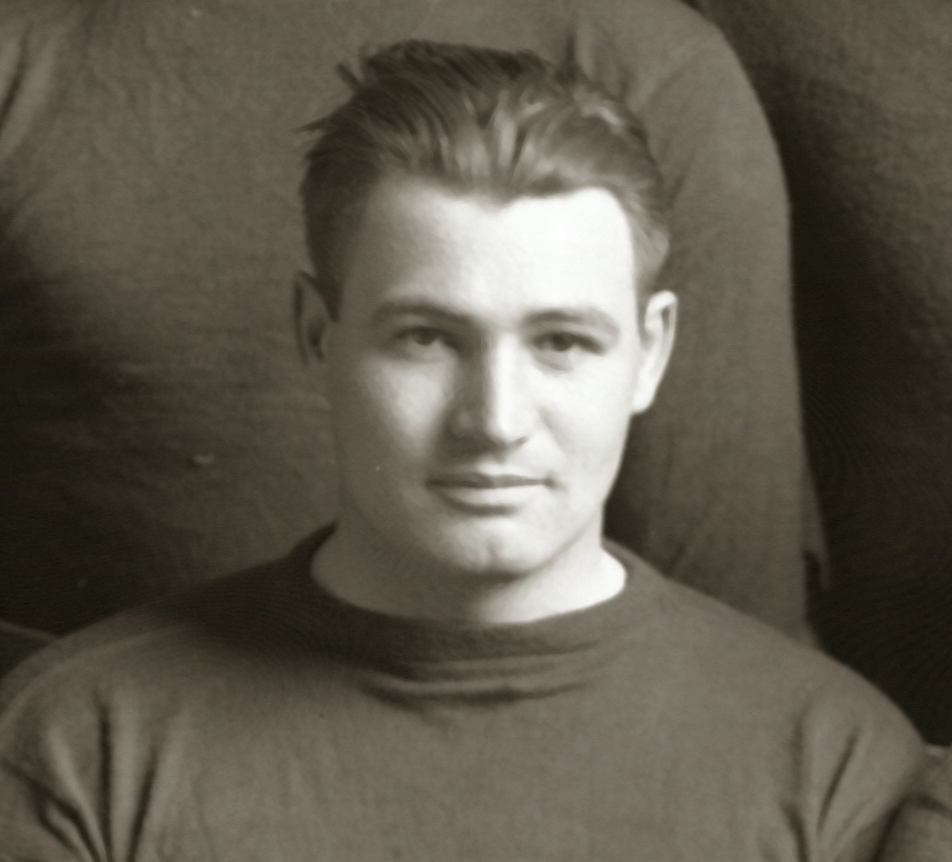

Profile
- Position: Guard

Personal information
- Born: March 1, 1892; Corunna, Michigan
- Died: November 12, 1976 (aged 84); Flint, Michigan
- Listed height: 5 ft 7 in (1.70 m)
- Listed weight: 212 lb (96 kg)

Career information
- College: Michigan

Career history
- 1912–1915: Michigan

Frank Gurnee Millard (March 1, 1892 – November 12, 1976) was an American politician and football player.

== Early life and education ==
Millard was born in Corunna, Michigan, in 1892, the son of Frank A. Millard and Emma (Gurnee) Millard. He attended the public schools in Corunna. He subsequently attended the University of Michigan, receiving his bachelor's degree in 1914 and a law degree in 1916. While attending Michigan, Millard played guard for the Michigan Wolverines football team from 1912 to 1915.

== Career ==
After receiving his law degree, Millard became an attorney in Flint, Michigan. During World War I, he served as an artillery lieutenant in the U.S. Army in France. In 1921, he helped organize the Michigan National Guard. He was active in Republican Party politics and served as the chairman of the Genesse County Republican Committee from 1922 to 1924 and in 1940. He was a member of the Republican State Central Committee from 1948 to 1950.

== Michigan Attorney General ==
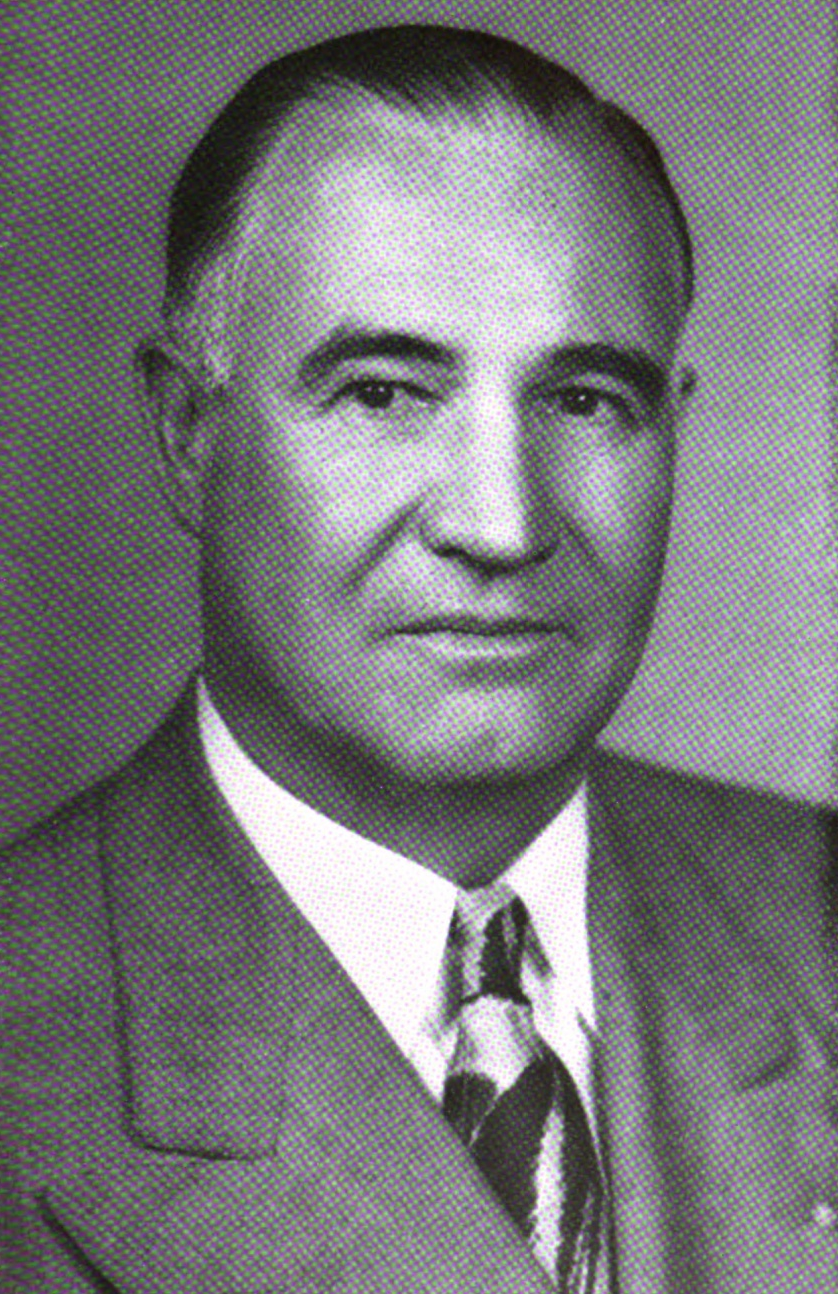
Millard as Michigan Attorney General

In 1950, Millard was elected as Michigan Attorney General. He served in that position from January 1951 through December 1954. In November 1954, he lost his re-election bid to Thomas M. Kavanagh. He was the last Republican to hold the office of Attorney General in Michigan until Mike Cox was narrowly elected to the office in 2002.

== General Counsel of the Army ==
In March 1955, he was appointed by President Dwight Eisenhower as the General Counsel of the U.S. Army. In December 1956, he was hospitalized at the University of Michigan Hospital where he underwent surgery to remove a portion of one lung. He served as the Army's General Counsel through February 1961.

Millard was married to Dorothy E. McCorkell on November 8, 1930. He died on November 12, 1976, aged 84.

Party political offices
| Preceded by Stuart B. White | Republican nominee for Michigan Attorney General; 1950, 1952, 1954 | Succeeded by Richard C. Van Dusen |
Legal offices
| Preceded by Stephen John Roth | Michigan Attorney General; 1951-1955 | Succeeded by Thomas M. Kavanagh |
Government offices
| Preceded by John G. Adams | General Counsel of the Army; April 1, 1955 – February 28, 1961 | Succeeded by Powell Pierpoint |
