= John A. Johnson =

John A. Johnson may refer to:

- John Johnson (astronomer) (born 1977), Harvard professor
- John Albert Johnson (1861–1909), Minnesota governor
- John Alvin Johnson (1915–2005), U.S. lawyer and businessman
- John A. Johnson (Minnesota politician) (1883–1962), Minnesota state legislator
- John Anders Johnson (1832–1901), member of the Wisconsin State Assembly
- Jack Johnson (John Arthur Johnson) (1878–1946), American boxer

== See also ==
- Johnny A. Johnson (born 1915), American Negro leagues baseball player
- Jonathan G. A. Johnson (born 1976), Island Governor of Saba
- John Johnson (disambiguation)
