= James E. McPherson =

American government official (born 1953)

James McPherson
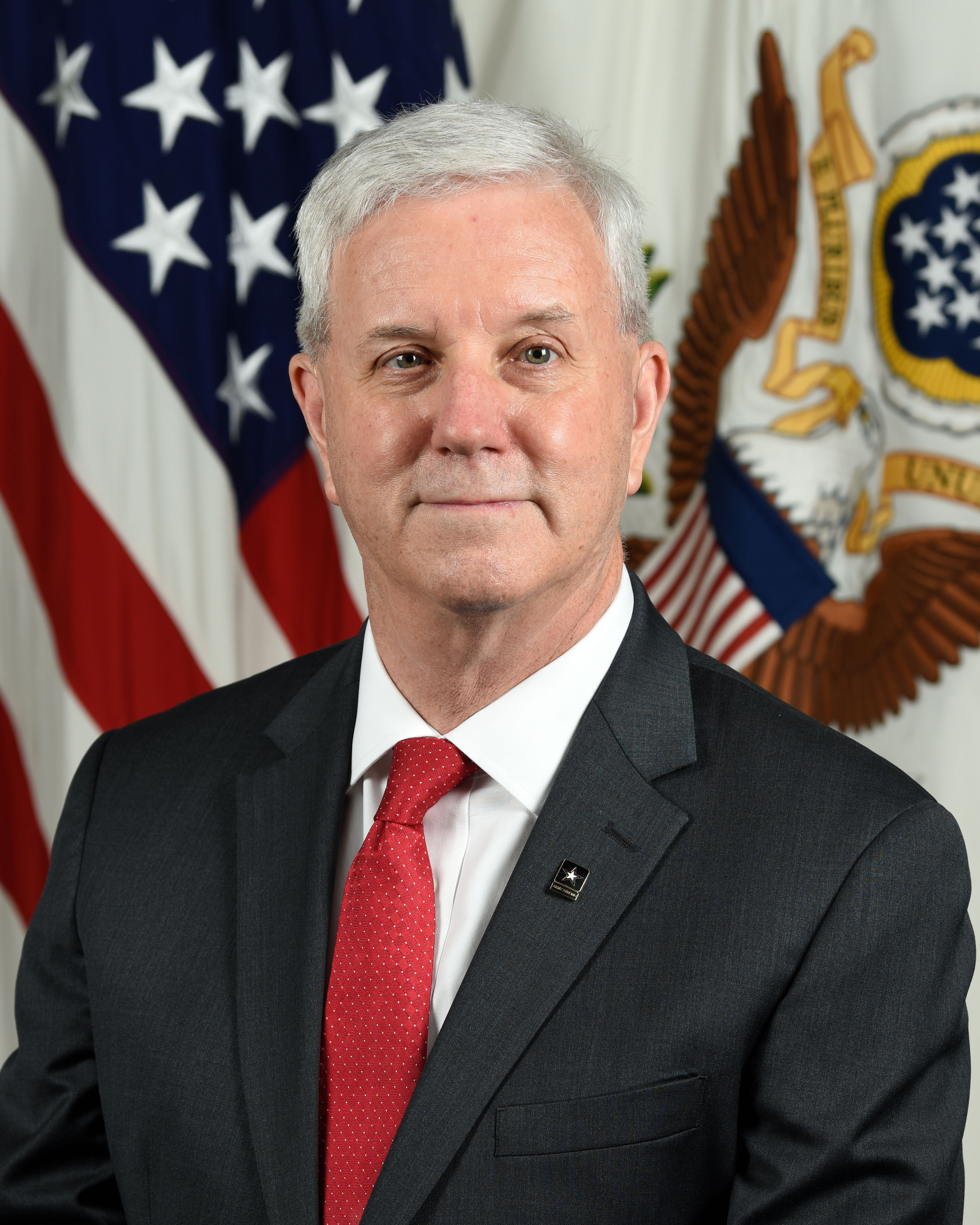

34th United States Under Secretary of the Army
- In office March 25, 2020 – January 20, 2021; Acting: July 23, 2019 – March 24, 2020
- President: Donald Trump
- Preceded by: Ryan McCarthy
- Succeeded by: Gabe Camarillo

General Counsel of the Army
- In office January 2, 2018 – March 24, 2020
- President: Donald Trump
- Preceded by: Alissa Starzak
- Succeeded by: Carrie Ricci

Acting United States Secretary of the Navy
- In office April 7, 2020 – May 29, 2020
- President: Donald Trump
- Deputy: Gregory J. Slavonic (acting)
- Preceded by: Thomas Modly (acting)
- Succeeded by: Kenneth Braithwaite

39th Judge Advocate General of the Navy
- In office 2004–2006
- President: George W. Bush
- Preceded by: Michael Lohr
- Succeeded by: Bruce E. MacDonald

Personal details
- Born: James Edwin McPherson; January 20, 1953 (age 73) Los Angeles County, California, U.S.
- Spouse: Nancy Culver McPherson (1972-1990) br>Jennifer
- Children: 2
- Education: San Diego State University (BA); University of San Diego (JD); JAG School (LLM)

Military service
- Allegiance: United States
- Branch/service: United States Army; United States Navy
- Years of service: 1972–1975 (Army); 1979–2006 (Navy)
- Rank: Rear Admiral
- Unit: Army Military Police Corps; Navy Judge Advocate General's Corps
- Awards: Legion of Merit; Meritorious Service Medal; Army Commendation Medal

James Edwin McPherson (born January 20, 1953) is an American government official and retired United States Navy rear admiral. He served as the General Counsel of the Army from January 2, 2018, to March 24, 2020. He served as the United States Under Secretary of the Army from March 25, 2020, to January 20, 2021, and in acting capacity from July 23, 2019, to March 24, 2020. He served as Acting United States Secretary of the Navy from April 7, 2020, to May 29, 2020, following the resignation of Thomas Modly.

== Education ==
McPherson is a native of San Diego. He graduated from San Diego State University in 1977 with an undergraduate degree in public administration. He received his Juris Doctor (J.D.) in 1981 from the University of San Diego School of Law, and in 1991, he was awarded a Master of Laws degree in Military Law from The Judge Advocate General's Legal Center and School at the University of Virginia, Charlottesville, Virginia. He was awarded the Degree of Doctor of Laws (honoris causa) by King University in 2023.

== Career ==
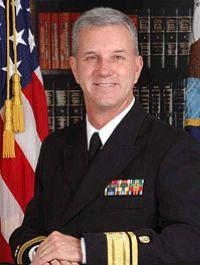
Rear Admiral James McPherson as the 39th Judge Advocate General of the Navy.

McPherson enlisted in the Army in 1972, and served three years as a military policeman, before leaving the Army for college. In 1979 he was commissioned as an ensign in the Judge Advocate General's Corps of the Naval Reserve. He interned in the Naval Legal Service Office (NLSO) in San Diego and then attended Naval Justice School, in Newport, R.I., completing his training in 1982. He served as a judge advocate and trial counsel at several Navy commands and ships before and after completing his graduate training in 1991. In June 1994, he reported to the staff of Commander, Submarine Force, U.S. Atlantic Fleet as the Force Judge Advocate. In December 1995, he joined the staff of the Vice Chief of Naval Operations as the Assistant for Legal and Legislative Matters. In October 1997, he became Special Counsel to the Chief of Naval Operations. In September 2000, he assumed command of Trial Service Office East, Norfolk, Va. In October 2002, he was promoted to rear admiral and assigned as the Deputy Judge Advocate General of the Navy and Commander of Naval Legal Service Command. On November 10, 2004, McPherson became the 39th Judge Advocate General of the Navy, a position he held until 2006.

McPherson has served as the executive director of the National Association of Attorneys General. He also served as the general counsel of the Department of Defense Counterintelligence Field Activity.

On October 13, 2017, President Donald Trump announced the nomination of McPherson to become the General Counsel of the United States Department of the Army. The United States Senate confirmed his nomination by voice vote on December 20. He was sworn in on January 2, 2018.

On December 5, 2019, Trump nominated him to be Under Secretary of the Army, a position that he had been holding since July 23, 2019, in an acting capacity, while concurrently serving as General Counsel of the Army. He was sworn in on March 25, 2020, after being confirmed by the Senate. Defense Secretary Mark Esper designated McPherson as Acting Secretary of the Navy on April 7, replacing Thomas Modly who resigned the same day.

== Award ==
McPherson is a recipient of the Navy Distinguished Service Medal, the Legion of Merit, the Meritorious Service Medal, Secretary of Defense Medal for Outstanding Public Service and Secretary of the Army Medal for Distinguished Public Service.

== Personal life ==
He and his wife Jennifer are married and have two adult children.

Military offices
Preceded by Michael Franklin Lohr	Judge Advocate General of the Navy; 2004–2006	Succeeded by Bruce E. MacDonald
Government offices
Preceded by Earl G. Matthews; Acting	General Counsel of the Army; 2018–2020	Succeeded by Michele Pearce
Political offices
Preceded by Ryan McCarthy	United States Under Secretary of the Army; 2019–2021; Acting: 2019–2020	Succeeded by Christopher Lowman; Acting
Preceded by Thomas Modly; Acting	United States Secretary of the Navy; Acting; 2020	Succeeded by Kenneth Braithwaite
