= Steven J. Morello =

American lawyer

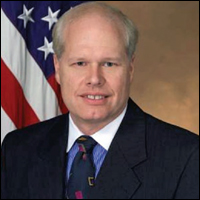
Steven J. Morello

Steven J. Morello is an American lawyer who served as General Counsel of the Army from 2001 to 2004.

== Biography ==
Steven J. Morello's mother was an enrolled member of The Sault Ste Tribe of Chippewa Indians in Michigan. Morello was educated at the Edmund A. Walsh School of Foreign Service at Georgetown University, earning a bachelor's degree in 1974. While at Georgetown, from 1972 to 1974, he worked as a Staff Assistant for Sen. Philip Hart (D)–Mich. He then attending the University of Detroit Mercy, receiving a J.D. in 1977. He later earned a Master of Business Administration degree from Boston University.

From 1978 to 1987, Morello was a judge advocate in the Judge Advocate General's Corps, United States Army. After leaving the Judge Advocate General's Corps, Morello worked as an attorney for Digital Equipment Corporation and the Northrop Corporation. In 1991, Heinz Prechter hired Morello as the General Counsel of Prechter Holdings and of the American Sunroof Corporation, a position Morello held until 2001.

He earned an M.A. in Pastoral Studies from SHMS.

In 2001, President of the United States George W. Bush nominated Morello to be the first Native American General Counsel of the Army and, after Senate confirmation, Morello held this post from 2001 until September 2004. He took office only six weeks before the September 11 attack on the Pentagon.

Morello became the General Counsel of his own tribe, The Sault Ste Marie Tribe of Chippewa Indians in 2004, serving there until 2006. From 2007 to 2009, he served as Deputy Assistant Secretary for Intergovernmental Affairs and the First Director of the Office of Indian Energy Policy and Planning in the United States Department of Energy. Since 2009, Morello has also been the principle of his own law firm, Native Law Group.

Government offices
Preceded by Charles A. Blanchard	General Counsel of the Army; 2001–2004	Succeeded by Brad Carson
