= Bernard A. Monaghan =

American lawyer

Bernard Andrew Monaghan Jr.
- Born: January 28, 1916; Birmingham, Alabama
- Died: 1987 (aged 70–71)
- Allegiance: United States of America
- Branch: United States Marine Corps
- Rank: Captain
- Other work: Lawyer

Bernard Andrew Monaghan Jr. (1916–1987) was United States General Counsel of the Army from 1952 to 1953 and Chief Executive Officer of Vulcan Materials Company from 1959 to 1981.

== Biography ==
Bernard A. Monaghan was born in Birmingham, Alabama, on January 28, 1916, son of Bernard Andrew Monaghan Sr. and Mary Frances (Jackson) Monaghan. He was educated at Birmingham–Southern College, receiving a B.A. in 1934. During his time there, he was affiliated with Alpha Tau Omega. He then attended Harvard Law School, receiving an LL.B. in 1937. He was admitted to the bar of Alabama in 1937. Monaghan then studied at Oxford University as a Rhodes Scholar, receiving a second B.A. in 1939.

In 1939, Monaghan returned to Birmingham, joining a law firm that is the predecessor firm of Bradley Arant Rose & White (which would eventually merge and become Bradley Arant Boult Cummings LLP). During World War II, Monaghan served in the United States Marine Corps as a captain. After the war, he returned to his law firm, becoming a partner in the firm in 1948. In 1952, he took a leave of absence from the firm to serve as General Counsel of the Army, holding that post from August 26, 1952, until August 14, 1953. He then returned to his Birmingham law practice. He also remained active in the United States Marine Corps Reserve, eventually attaining the rank of lieutenant colonel.

In 1958, one of Monaghan's clients, Vulcan Materials Company, asked Monaghan to join their company as executive vice president. After a year as executive vice president, in 1959 Monaghan became president and chief executive officer of Vulcan Materials. He held this position until 1981. Under Monaghan's leadership, Vulcan Materials grew dramatically, eventually becoming a Forbes 500 company.

Government offices
Preceded by Francis Shackelford	General Counsel of the Army; August 26, 1952 – August 14, 1953	Succeeded by John G. Adams
