= General Counsel of the Army =

Chief legal officer of the U.S. Army

General Counsel of the Department of the Army
- AGC
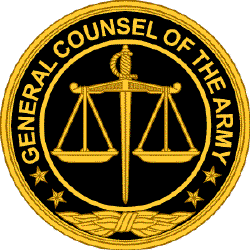
- Seal of the Office of the General Counsel

- Flag of the general counsel and the assistant secretaries of the Army

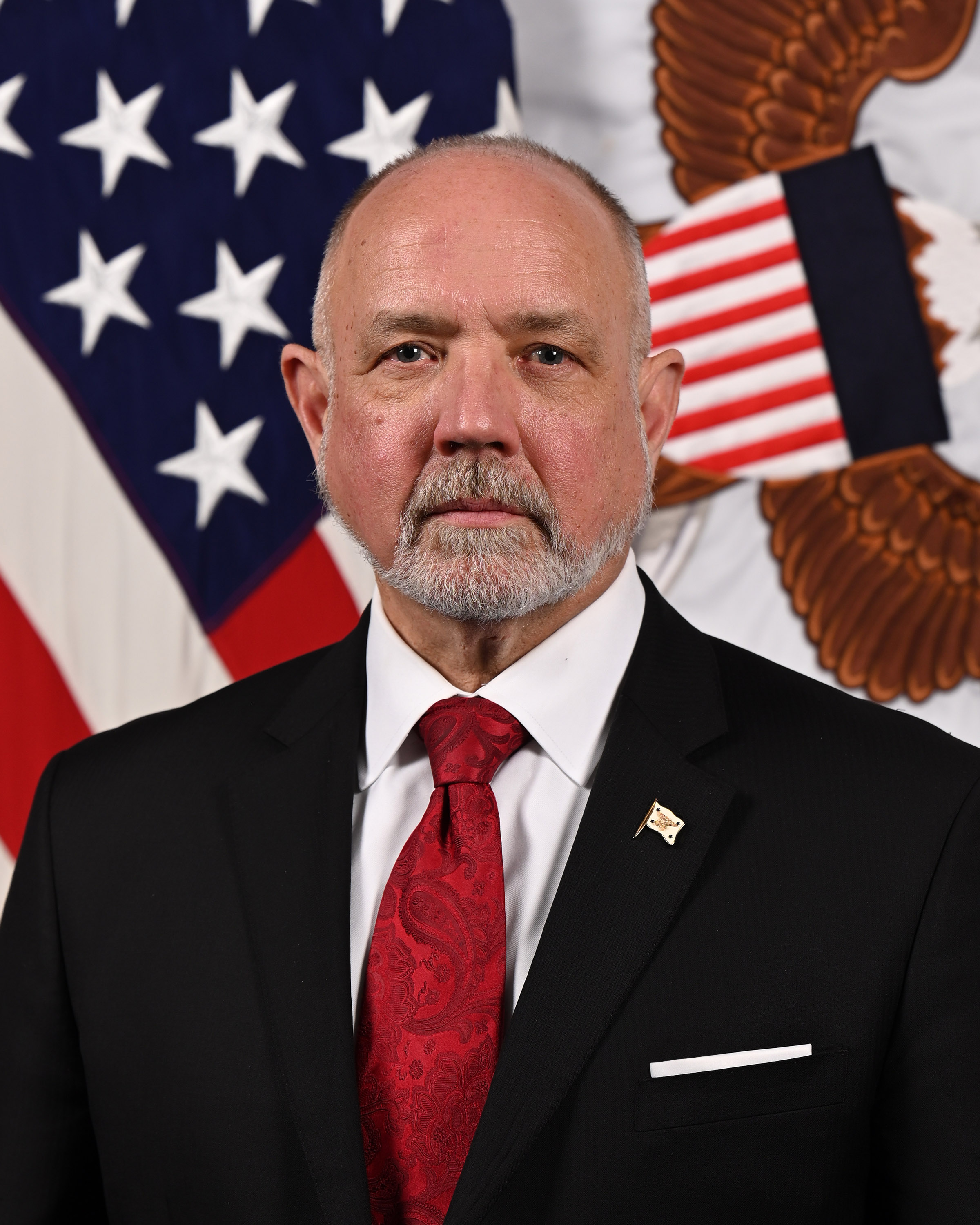
- Incumbent; Charles l. Young III since December 22, 2025
- Department of the Army; Office of the Secretary
- Style: The Honorable
- Reports to: Secretary of the Army; Under Secretary of the Army
- Seat: The Pentagon, Arlington County, Virginia, United States
- Appointer: The president; with Senate advice and consent
- Term length: No fixed term
- Constituting instrument: 10 U.S.C. § 3019
- Formation: 1949
- First holder: Karl Bendetsen
- Deputy: Principal Deputy General Counsel (PDGC)
- Salary: Executive Schedule, level IV
- Website: ogc.altess.army.mil

The general counsel of the Army (also known as the Army general counsel, abbreviated AGC) is the chief legal officer of the U.S. Department of the Army and senior legal advisor to the secretary of the Army.

U.S. law provides that the general counsel shall be appointed from the civilian life by the president of the United States, with the advice and consent of the United States Senate, and that the secretary of the Army prescribes the duties of the office.

The Office of the General Counsel of the Army also provides legal advice to the under secretary of the Army and the five assistant secretaries, as well as other members of the Army Secretariat. The general counsel of the Army also plays a role in supervising the Office of the Judge Advocate General and the Office of the Chief Counsel of the United States Army Corps of Engineers.

== Partial list of general counsels of the Army ==
Image	Name	Term start	Term end	President appointed by	Secretary served under
	Karl Bendetsen	1949	1950	Harry Truman	Gordon Gray
	Francis Shackelford	1950	1952	Harry Truman	Frank Pace
	Bernard A. Monaghan	1952	1953	Harry Truman	Frank Pace, Robert T. Stevens
	John G. Adams	1953	1955	Dwight Eisenhower	Robert T. Stevens
	Frank Millard	1955	1961	Dwight Eisenhower	Wilber M. Brucker
	Powell Pierpoint	1961	1963	John F. Kennedy	Elvis Jacob Stahr Jr., Cyrus Vance
	Joseph A. Califano Jr.	1963	1964	John F. Kennedy	Cyrus Vance
	Alfred B. Fitt	1964	1967	Lyndon B. Johnson	Stephen Ailes, Stanley Rogers Resor
	Robert E. Jordan III	1967	1971	Lyndon B. Johnson	Stanley Rogers Resor
	Robert W. Berry	1971	1974	Richard Nixon	Robert Frederick Froehlke, Howard Callaway
	Charles D. Ablard	1975	1977	Gerald Ford	Martin Richard Hoffmann
	Jill Wine-Volner	1977	1980	Jimmy Carter	Clifford Alexander, Jr.
	Sara E. Lister	1980	1981	Jimmy Carter	Clifford Alexander Jr.
	Delbert Spurlock	1981	1983	Ronald Reagan	John Otho Marsh Jr.
	Susan J. Crawford	1983	1989	Ronald Reagan	John Otho Marsh Jr.
	William J. Haynes II	1990	1993	George H. W. Bush	Michael P. W. Stone
	William Thaddeus Coleman III	1994	1999	Bill Clinton	Togo D. West Jr.
	Charles A. Blanchard	1999	2001	Bill Clinton	Louis Caldera
	Steven J. Morello	2001	2004	George W. Bush	Thomas E. White, Francis J. Harvey
	Brad Carson	2012	2014	Barack Obama	John M. McHugh
	Alissa Starzak	2015	2017	Barack Obama	Eric Fanning, Patrick Murphy, Robert M. Speer
	Earl G. Matthews (Acting)	2017	2018	Donald Trump	Robert M. Speer, Mark Esper
	James E. McPherson	2018	2020	Donald Trump	Mark Esper, Ryan McCarthy
	Michele Pearce (acting)	2020	2021	Donald Trump	Ryan McCarthy
	Craig R. Schmauder (senior official)	2021	2022	Joe Biden	John E. Whitley (acting), Christine Wormuth
	Carrie Ricci	2022	2025	Joe Biden	Christine Wormuth
	Levator Norsworthy (senior official)	2025	2025	Donald Trump	Daniel P. Driscoll
	Daniel S. Zevitz (acting)	2025	2025	Donald Trump	Daniel P. Driscoll
	Charles L. Young III	2025	Present	Donald Trump	Daniel P. Driscoll, Adam Telle (acting)

== See also ==
- General Counsel of the Department of Defense
- General Counsel of the Department of the Air Force
- General Counsel of the Navy
