= Mary L. Walker =

American lawyer

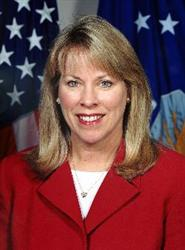
Mary L. Walker

Mary Walker (born December 1, 1948) is an American lawyer who served as a high-ranking appointee under Presidents Ronald Reagan, George H.W. Bush and George W. Bush.

== Private law practice and government career ==
Mary L. Walker was born in Dayton, Ohio on December 1, 1948. She was educated at the University of California, Berkeley, receiving an A.B. in Biological Sciences in 1970. She then attended both UCLA Law School and Boston University School of Law, receiving a J.D. in 1973.

Walker joined the legal department of the Southern Pacific Transportation Company in San Francisco in 1973. She worked there until 1976 when she joined the law firm of Richards, Watson, Dreyfuss & Gershon in Los Angeles. She was made a partner in 1979, working there until 1982.

In 1982, Walker accepted an appointment in the United States Department of Justice as Principal Deputy Assistant Attorney General in the Land and Natural Resources Division. From 1984 to 1985, she was the Deputy Solicitor of the United States Department of the Interior. On September 18, 1985, President of the United States Ronald Reagan nominated her to be Assistant Secretary of Energy (Environment, Safety, and Health). She was confirmed by the Senate and held this office until 1988.

She spent 1988-89 as Vice President of Law Environmental Inc. She was a partner at Richards, Watson & Gershon and their managing partner in San Francisco from 1989 to 1991. She was a partner of Luce, Forward, Hamilton & Scripps in San Diego from 1991 to 1994, and then a partner at Brobeck, Phleger & Harrison in San Diego from 1994 to 2001.

She was also a U.S. Commissioner on the Inter-American Tropical Tuna Commission from 1988 to 1995, a Presidential Appointment.

An evangelical Christian, Walker co-founded the Professional Women's Fellowship in San Diego, a group related to Campus Crusade for Christ.

On September 26, 2001, President George W. Bush nominated Walker to be General Counsel of the Air Force. She was confirmed by the Senate and held this office for the duration of the presidency of George W. Bush. As of 2009, she is the longest-serving General Counsel in the history of the Department of the Air Force. During her tenure there, she received many awards for her service.

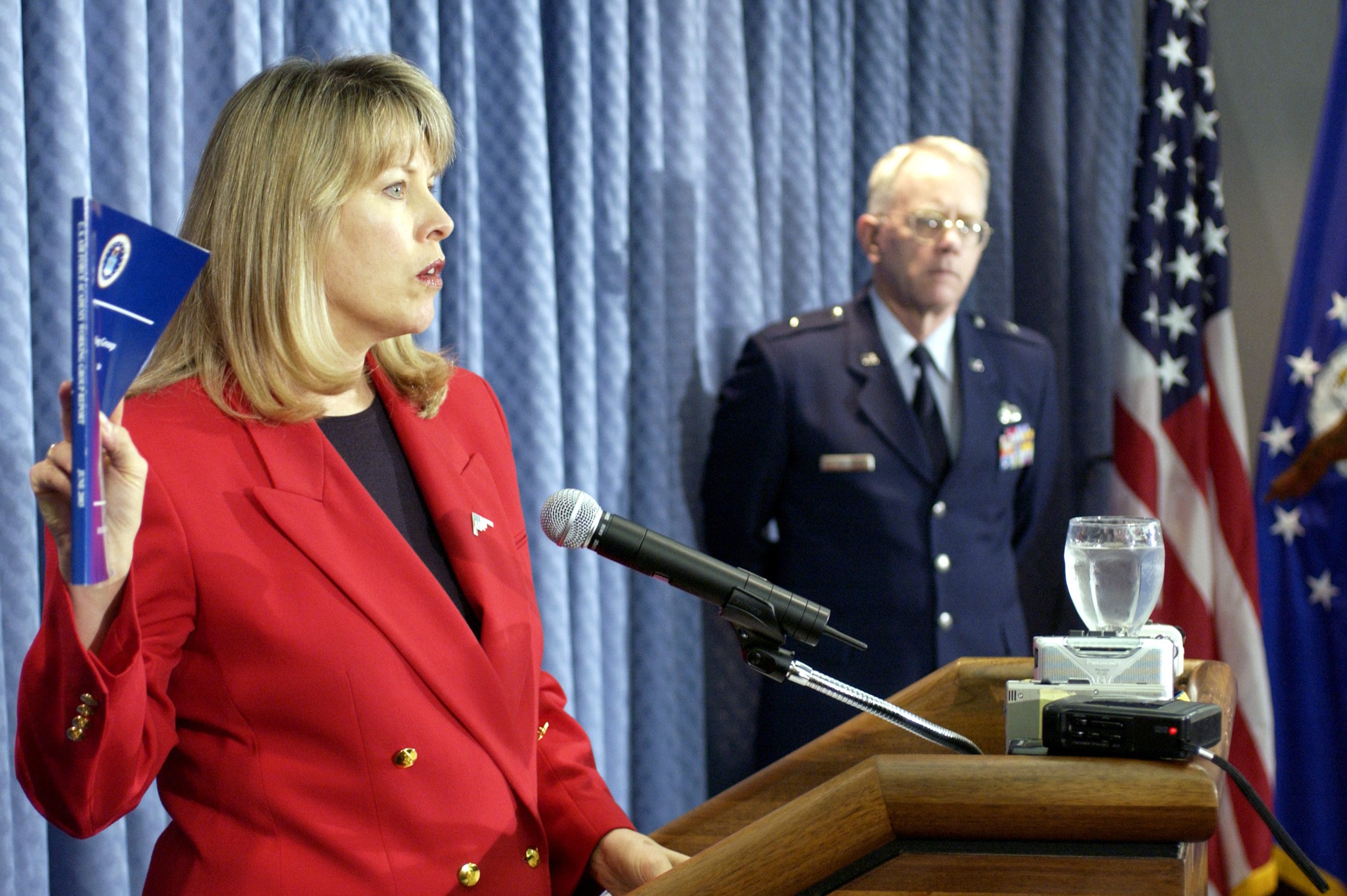
Mary L. Walker, holds a copy of the report on the US Air Force Academy (USAFA) sexual misconduct study

== Post-government career ==
Walker returned to private practice in 2009 and, as an independent contractor, provides legal services to private clients and law firms.

== Personal life ==
Walker is divorced and has one son. She lives in San Diego.

== Role in the detainee interrogation controversy ==
On January 15, 2003, as a result of concern expressed by the Army that more techniques were needed to interrogate the terrorists being held at Guantanamo, the United States Secretary of Defense Donald Rumsfeld ordered a review of what additional techniques might be available and permissible under law. Two days later, William J. Haynes, II, the General Counsel of the United States Department of Defense designated Walker as the head of a departmental working group tasked with implementing the Secretary's request. Walker established a committee of the senior lawyers in the Pentagon, both military and civilian, and a career-level working group having expertise in the substantive issues and additional techniques to be given legal and policy review.

The next week, Walker received an extensive legal memorandum, written in 2001, from the Office of Legal Counsel of the U.S. Department of Justice, authored by John Yoo and signed by Jay Bybee, the head of the Office of Legal Counsel. She was advised by William J. Haynes, General Counsel of the Department of Defense, that this legal analysis would be controlling. As the two working groups proceeded to conduct their review, on January 23, 2003, General Counsel of the Navy Alberto J. Mora, a member of the senior legal group, reviewed a hard copy of that memorandum in Walker's office (copies were not made widely available pursuant to instructions of William J. Haynes, General Counsel of the Department of Defense). This led to a disagreement between Mora and the senior legal group. Mora disagreed with the reasoning of the Department of Justice, whereas Walker agreed with Yoo's reasoning concerning the powers of the President. Walker encouraged discussion among the legal team and invited Yoo to the Pentagon to answer their questions, which he did on two occasions. Walker also encouraged Mora to share his views and to meet with General Counsel Haynes. Mora met with Haynes and circulated an opposing draft memo. Haynes did not accept Mora's views, nor did any members of the senior legal committee.

On March 6, 2003, by a unanimous vote, all members of the senior legal group (including the Navy) presented their recommendations for new techniques to Secretary Rumsfeld. These had been proposed by the technical working group and were subject to legal and policy review by the senior legal team. The recommendations to Secretary Rumsfeld stated that the reasoning behind the Department of Justice memorandum was sound, although the group expressly stated it did not need to rely upon the more far-reaching conclusions of the Justice Department's memorandum concerning the powers of the President. The final report was presented on April 4, 2003. Secretary Rumsfeld adopted the vast majority of the new techniques proposed. At the Administration's request, the Justice Department subsequently reviewed the Working Group's recommendations that were adopted by Secretary Rumsfeld and fully endorsed them.
