= Earl G. Matthews =

American attorney

Earl Matthews
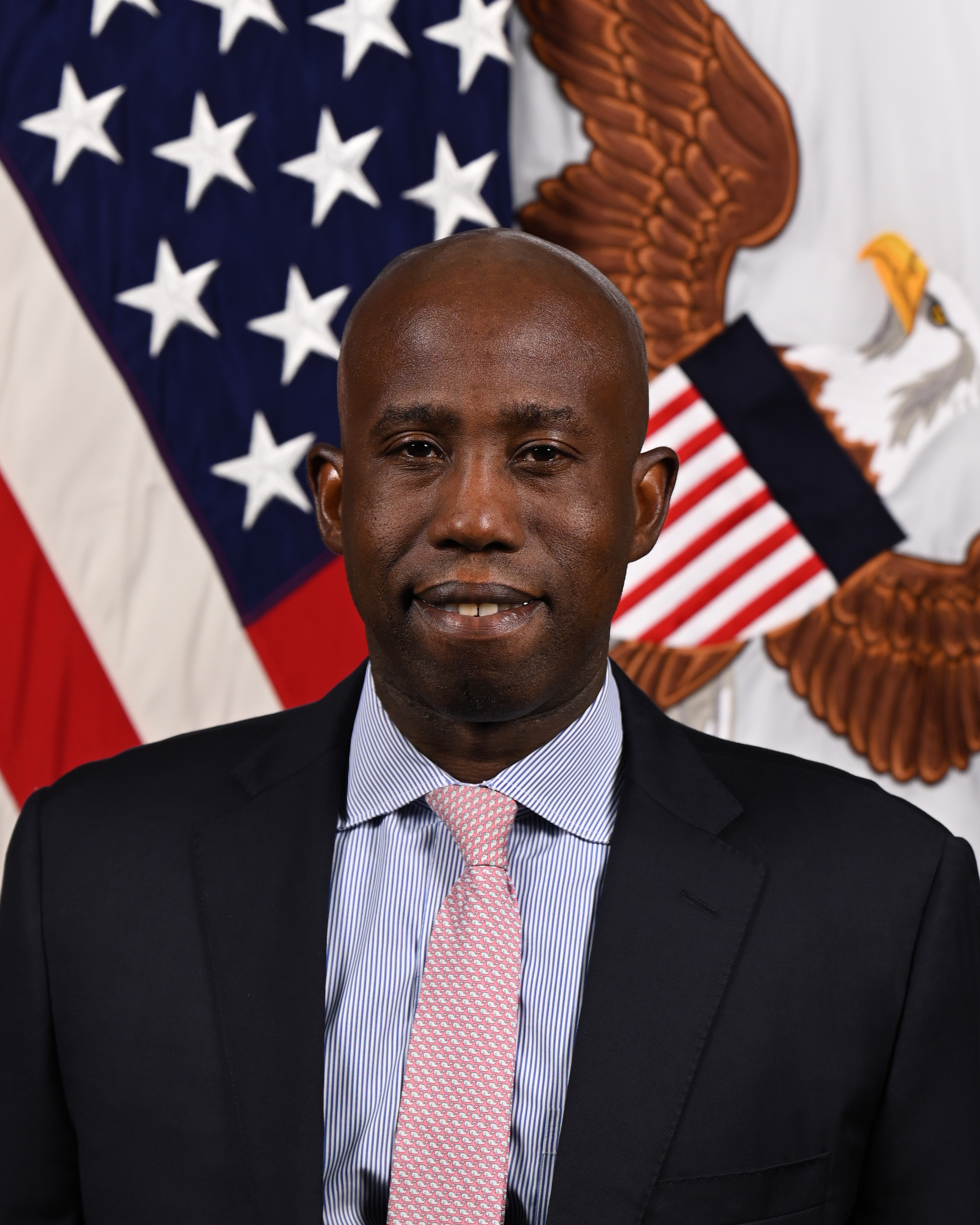
- Official portrait, 2025

General Counsel of the Department of Defense
- Incumbent
- Assumed office July 31, 2025
- President: Donald Trump
- Preceded by: Caroline D. Krass

General Counsel of the Department of the Army
- Acting
- In office June 21, 2017 – January 2, 2018
- Appointed by: Donald Trump
- Preceded by: Alissa Starzak
- Succeeded by: James E. McPherson

Personal details
- Born: Philadelphia, Pennsylvania, U.S.
- Education: Villanova University (BA); Harvard University (JD); Georgetown University (LLM); National Intelligence University (MS); United States Army War College (MS)

Military service
- Allegiance: United States
- Branch/service: United States Army
- Years of service: 2000–present
- Rank: Colonel
- Unit: District of Columbia National Guard • Office of the Staff Judge Advocate, Joint Task Force-National Capital Region
- Battles/wars: War in Afghanistan; Iraq War
- Awards: Bronze Star (2)

Earl G. Matthews is an American government official and attorney who held senior positions within the Department of the Army and at the White House during the first administration of President Donald Trump. Appointed by the second Trump administration with the advice and consent of the Senate, he was sworn in on July 31, 2025 as General Counsel of the "Department of War". As General Counsel, Mr. Matthews serves as the chief legal officer of the Department and the principal legal advisor to the "Secretary of War". He is responsible for legal determinations and legal policy across the "Department of War" and its components. Previously, Matthews was a member of Trump's Department of Defense transition team and was appointed as a Special Assistant to the Secretary of Defense, James N. Mattis on January 20, 2017. Matthews was subsequently appointed as the Principal Deputy General Counsel of the Army on June 21, 2019. He served as Acting General Counsel of the Army from June 21, 2017, until James E. McPherson was sworn in as General Counsel on January 2, 2018.

Matthews continued as Principal Deputy General Counsel of the Army until he was detailed to the White House to serve as Special Assistant to the President and Senior Director for Defense Policy and Strategy on the National Security Council staff in late May 2018.

Matthews was formally succeeded as Principal Deputy General Counsel of the Army by Robert J. Sander on July 22, 2018. Matthews was named as a Deputy Assistant to the President in January 2019 and continued to serve as Senior Director for Defense Policy and Strategy on the National Security Council (NSC) staff until his resignation from the White House in November 2019.

In December 2020, Matthews was appointed to the Defense Business Board. In January 2021, he was also appointed to the Naming Commission created in the 2021 NDAA.

== White House service ==
As a Deputy Assistant to the President, Matthews was one of the highest-ranking African-Americans in the Trump Administration. As Senior Director for Defense Policy and Strategy, he worked closely with then-National Security Advisor John R. Bolton on a range of sensitive national security matters.

Matthews was involved in the initial planning for the United States Space Force and co-authored an October 2018 White House memo to the Pentagon, with National Space Council Executive Secretary Scott Pace, requesting that the Department of Defense make a formal recommendation to President Trump as to whether the proposed Space Force should be organized an independent military department or should be organized as a separate military branch within the Department of the Air Force.

Matthews traveled with then National Security Advisor, John R. Bolton to Ukraine in August 2019 and Warsaw, Poland in September 2019 where he participated in meetings between Ukrainian president Volodymyr Zelenskyy and senior U.S. officials. In addition to Bolton, NSC Senior Director Tim Morrison and, top U.S. diplomat in Kyiv, Ambassador William Taylor also attended the meetings in Ukraine in which Matthews was present.

Matthews was also present for the meeting between Vice-president Mike Pence and Ukrainian president Volodymyr Zelenskyy which occurred in Warsaw on September 1, 2019. The Zelenskyy meetings Matthews attended in Ukraine and in Poland were a later focus of the House impeachment inquiry, but Matthews was not implicated in the inquiry. Matthews left his White House position on November 8, 2019.

In early December 2021, Colonel Earl G. Matthews released a memo that accused Charles A. Flynn, brother of Lieutenant General Michael T. Flynn, of making willful distortions of the events of January 6, describing Flynn and LTG Walter E. Piatt as "absolute and unmitigated liars" and of giving “perjured testimony before Congress”.

== Education ==
Matthews is a native of Philadelphia, Pennsylvania. He attended Villanova University and graduated with a Bachelor of Arts (B.A.), cum laude, Phi Beta Kappa, in May 1995. He earned a Juris Doctor (J.D.) degree from the Harvard Law School in June 1998, a Master of Science (M.S.) in Strategic Intelligence from the National Intelligence University in August 2005, and a Master of Laws (LL.M.) in National Security Law from the Georgetown University Law Center in 2013. In addition, Mr. Matthews earned an M.S. degree in Strategic Studies from the U.S. Army War College in 2016.

== Military background ==
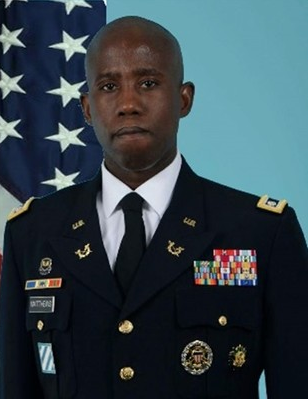
Earl G. Matthews as a Lieutenant Colonel (LTC), 2015, District of Columbia National Guard

In addition to his role as a civilian political appointee and White House staff member, Matthews concurrently serves as a Colonel (COL) within the United States Army, District of Columbia, National Guard (DCNG).

Matthews serves in the role of Staff Judge Advocate (SJA) for Joint Force Headquarters (JFHQ). As the Staff Judge Advocate for the DCNG, COL Matthews reports directly to the Commanding General and serves as the chief legal advisor on all matters regarding the DCNG.

== Awards and decorations ==
COL Matthews’ personal decorations include:

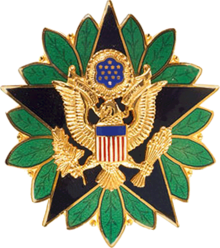
- Army Staff Identification Badge
- Joint Chiefs of Staff Identification Badge
- Bronze Star Medal with oak leaf cluster
- Defense Meritorious Service Medal
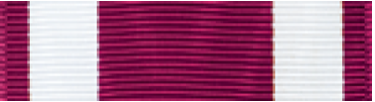
- Meritorious Service Medal
- Joint Service Commendation Medal with oak leaf cluster
- Army Commendation Medal 3 oak leaf clusters
- Army Reserve Components Achievement Medal
- Armed Forces Expeditionary Medal
- National Defense Service Medal
- Iraq Campaign Medal
- Afghanistan Campaign Medal
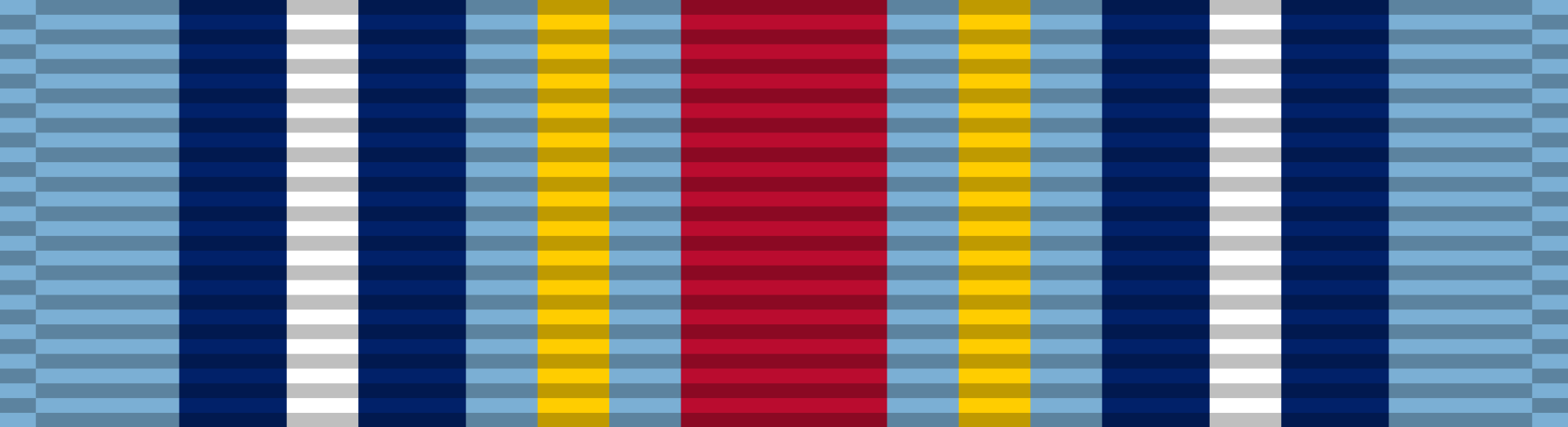
- Global War on Terrorism Expeditionary Medal
- Global War on Terrorism Service Medal
- Armed Forces Reserve Medal with “M” device and numeral three
- Overseas Service Ribbon with numeral three
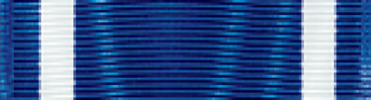
- NATO Medal
- Army Service Ribbon
- Joint Meritorious Unit Award
- Army Superior Unit Award
- Presidential Unit Citation
