= Michele Pearce =

American lawyer

Michele A. Pearce
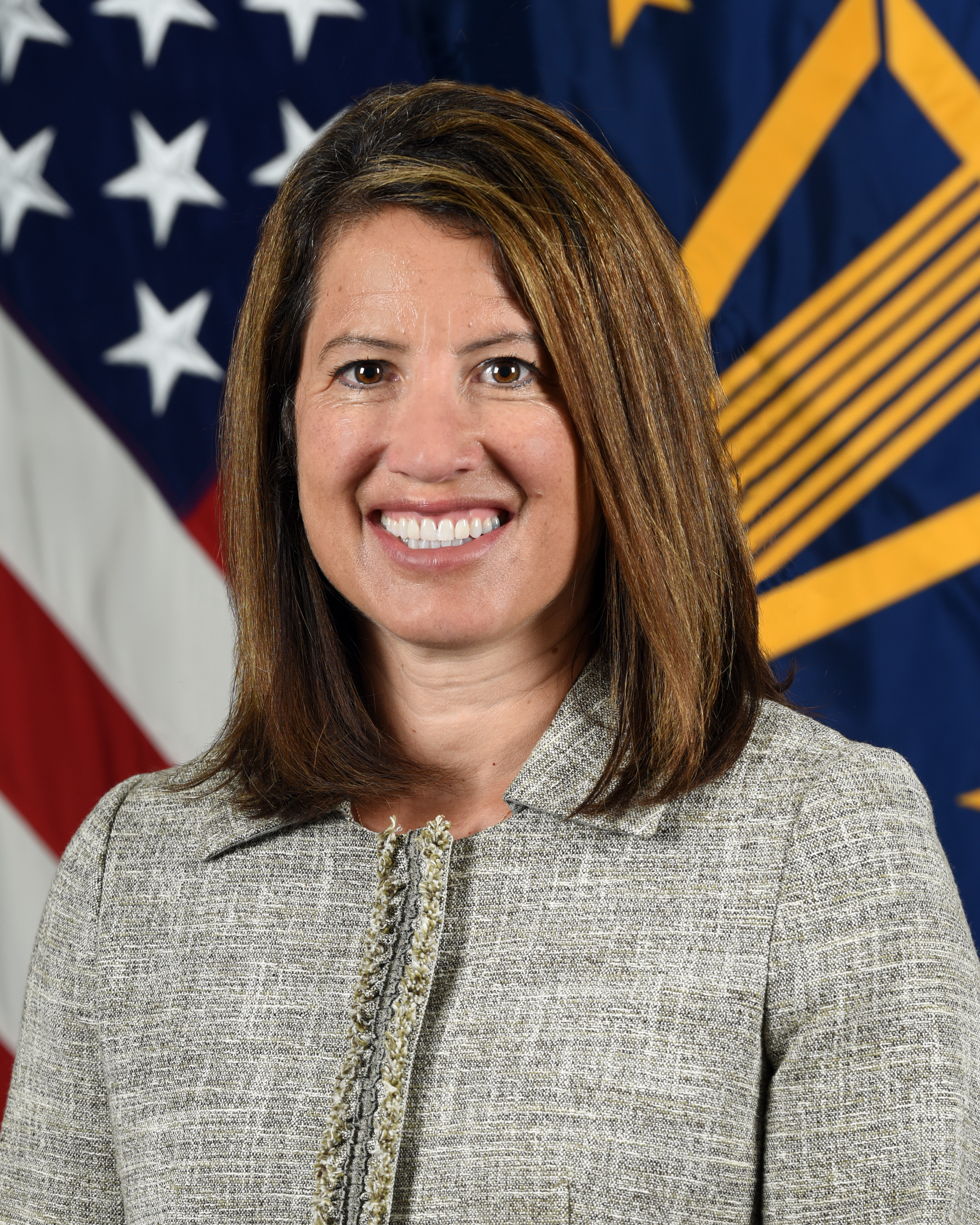

General Counsel of the Army
- Acting
- In office March 25, 2020 – January 19, 2021
- Appointed by: Donald Trump
- Preceded by: James E. McPherson
- Succeeded by: Craig R. Schmauder (senior official)

Principal Deputy General Counsel of the Department of the Army
- In office January 6, 2020 – January 19, 2021
- Appointed by: Donald Trump
- Preceded by: Robert J. Sander
- Succeeded by: Craig R. Schmauder (senior official)

Personal details
- Born: Michele Angelica Lozen; 1969 (age 56–57) Marine City, Michigan, U.S.
- Spouse(s): Lt Col (Ret) Stephen Wells Pearce, USAF
- Children: 2
- Education: Mount Holyoke College (AB); University of Connecticut School of Law (JD)

Military service
- Allegiance: United States
- Branch/service: United States Air Force
- Years of service: 1996-2009
- Rank: Lieutenant Colonel
- Battles/wars: Iraq War

Michele A. Pearce (born 1969) is an American lawyer and former government official. She served as the Principal Deputy General Counsel (PDGC) of the Army from January 6, 2020 to January 19, 2021. As PDGC, Pearce was the first assistant to the General Counsel and the number two attorney in the Department of the Army. Her duties included providing legal and policy advice to the Secretary of the Army, the Secretariat, and other Army senior leaders.

On April 9, 2020, President Trump announced his intent to nominate Pearce to serve as the General Counsel of the Army. On May 4, 2020, her nomination was sent to the Senate. On August 4, 2020, a hearing on her nomination was held before the Senate Armed Services Committee. During her confirmation hearing, Pearce testified regarding her commitment to implementing Project Inclusion focused on increasing diversity in the Army; the need for ethical implementation of artificial intelligence, employment of machine learning capabilities, and other emerging technologies; and the importance of safe and secure housing for military servicemembers and their families. The Senate Armed Services Committee voted by voice on September 15, 2020, to move Pearce's nomination forward. On January 3, 2021, her nomination was returned to the President under Rule XXXI, Paragraph 6 of the United States Senate.

== Early life and education ==
Michele Angelica Lozen was born in Marine City, Michigan, the daughter of Michael Russell Lozen (United States Navy (Ret.)) and Cecilia Rivera Sanchez Lozen. Her father, after whom Mount Lozen was named, served in Antarctica and was recognized by the U.S. Advisory Committee on Antarctic Names for exceptional service. He also served in Vietnam at Da Nang Air Base and aboard several nuclear ballistic submarines during the Cold War.

Pearce is a graduate of Mount Holyoke College and earned her J.D. degree from the University of Connecticut School of Law.

== Career ==
Prior to serving as PDGC, Pearce was the Department of Defense Deputy General Counsel (Legislation). In that role, she provided legal advice to senior leaders throughout DoD and the Military Services on matters concerning legislation, congressional testimony and investigations, and executive orders. She also served as DoD's primary point of contact on such matters with the White House Office of Management and Budget and the White House Counsel's Office.

Previously, Pearce served as the Senior Defense Advisor to Senator Susan Collins from 2015 to 2016. From 2010 to 2014, she was Staff Lead and Counsel of the Subcommittee on Readiness, Staff Lead of the Subcommittee on Oversight and Investigations, and Counsel of the Military Personnel Subcommittee to the House Committee on Armed Services.

Before working in Congress, Pearce served as the Chief Clerk to Andrew Effron, Chief Judge of the U.S. Court of Appeals for the Armed Forces, from 2009 to 2010.

== Military background ==
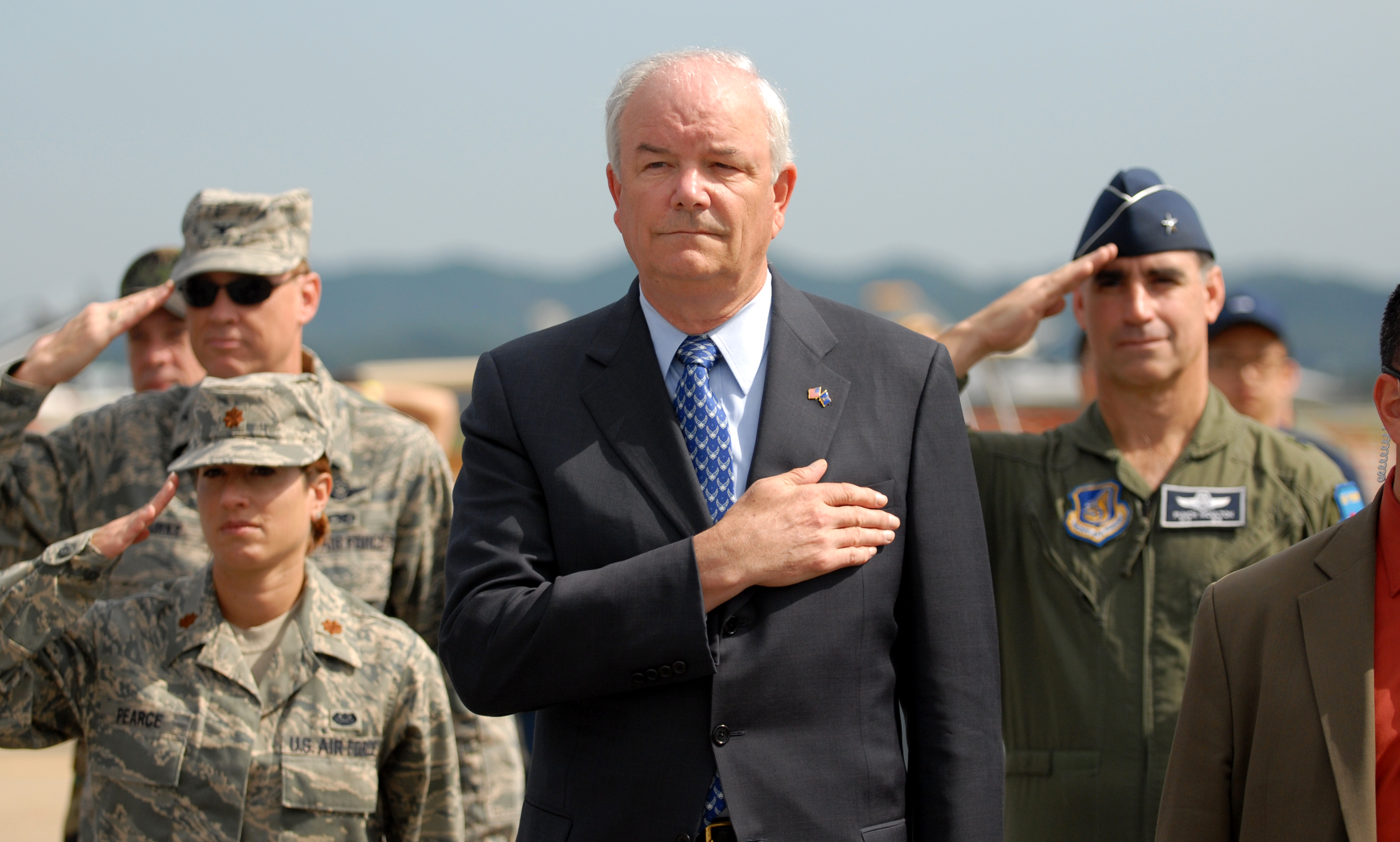
Air Force Secretary Michael W. Wynne, with Col Darryl Burke, Maj Michele Pearce and Brig Gen "Punch" Moulton, at Osan Air Base.

Pearce served on active duty in the United States Air Force Judge Advocate General's Corps from 1996 to 2009.

During her active duty service, Pearce served as an aide to the Secretary of the Air Force and as an assistant executive to The Judge Advocate General (TJAG). Pearce was also appointed by TJAG to serve as liaison officer to the Department of Defense Task Force Report on Care for Victims of Sexual Assault. She taught criminal law and trial practice as an adjunct faculty instructor at the United States Air Force Judge Advocate General's School and for the Task Force 134-Detention Operations course, responsible for training military attorneys for deployment to Iraq and Afghanistan. Earlier in her career, Pearce's assignments included serving as Chief of Military Justice at Nellis Air Force Base, Area Defense Counsel at Cannon Air Force Base, and as an Assistant Staff Judge Advocate at Mountain Home Air Force Base.

Pearce medically separated from the Air Force in 2009 after being diagnosed with lung and stomach cancer. She spent the last two years of her career undergoing chemotherapy and other treatments.

Pearce's military decorations include the Meritorious Service Medal, the Air Force Commendation Medal, the Joint Service Achievement Medal, the Air Force Achievement Medal, the Air Force Outstanding Unit Award, the Air Force Recognition Ribbon, the National Defense Service Medal, the Iraq Campaign Medal, the Global War on Terrorism Service Medal, and the Small Arms Expert Marksmanship Ribbon (Pistol).

== Memberships and community activity ==
Pearce is President of "Connect-McLean," a community civil organization based in McLean, Virginia focused on school and traffic safety initiatives and funding. She has served as Chair of the American Bar Association (ABA) Standing Committee on Armed Forces Law (SCAFL), and Executive Director of the Judge Advocates Association (JAA).
