= Carrie Ricci =

American government official

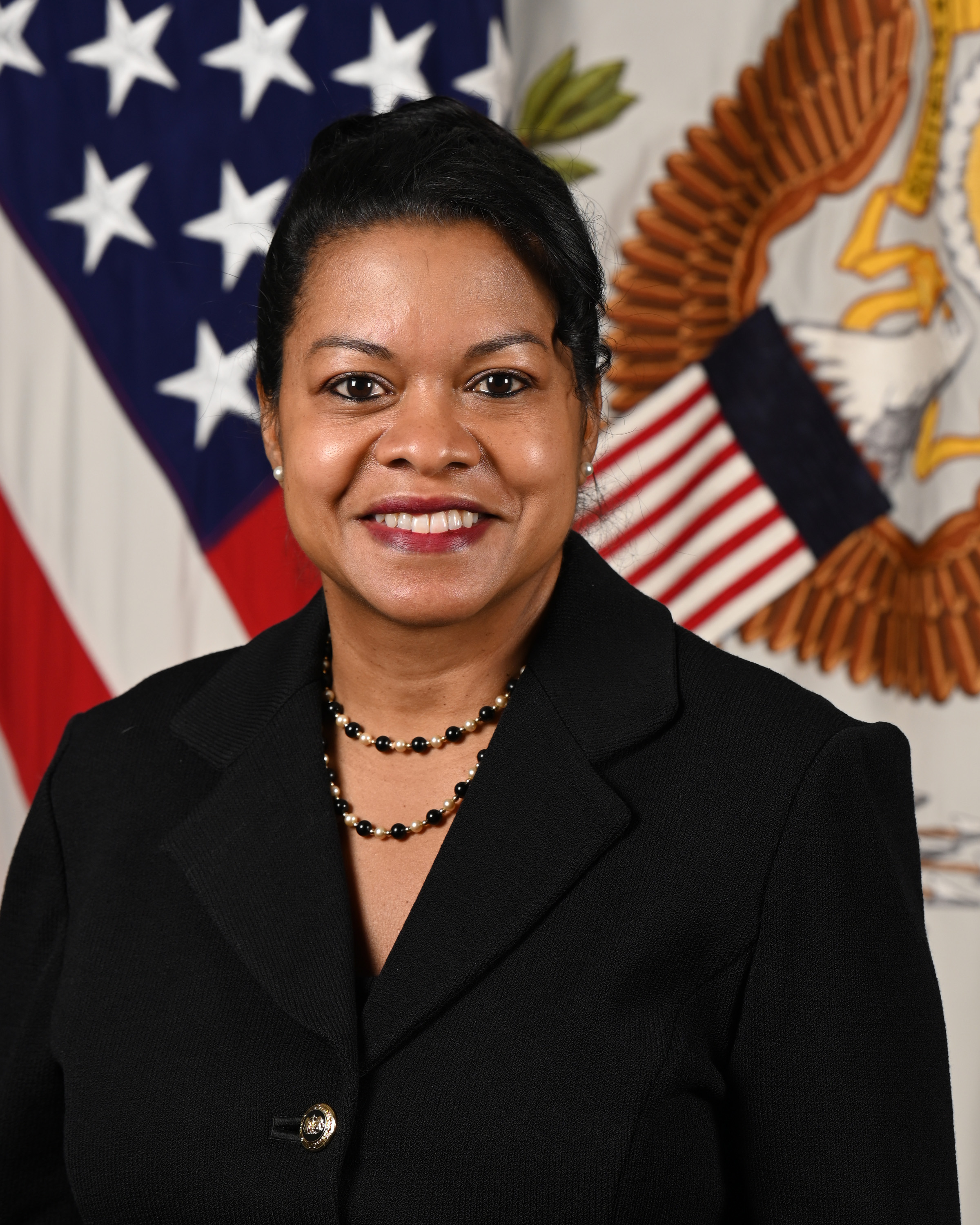

General Counsel of the Army
- In office January 3, 2022 – January 20, 2025
- President: Joe Biden
- Preceded by: James E. McPherson
- Succeeded by: Charles L. Young III

Personal details
- Education: Georgetown University (BS); University of Maryland (JD); The Judge Advocate General's Legal Center and School (LLM); George Washington University (LLM)

Military service
- Branch/service: United States Army
- Years of service: 1988–2010
- Rank: Lieutenant Colonel
- Unit: Judge Advocate General's Corps, United States Army

Carrie Frances Ricci is an American attorney and retired United States Army lieutenant colonel who had served as general counsel of the Army in the Biden administration.

== Education ==
Ricci earned a Bachelor of Science in Business Administration from Georgetown University, a Juris Doctor from the University of Maryland Francis King Carey School of Law, a Master of Laws in military and international law from the Judge Advocate General's Legal Center and School, and a Master of Laws in intellectual property, privacy, and information technology from the George Washington University Law School.

== Career ==
Ricci served in the Adjutant General’s Corps from 1988-1996, and the Judge Advocate General's Corps from 1996 to 2010, retiring with the rank of lieutenant colonel. During her tenure, Ricci served in the Army Office of the General Counsel, United States Army Intelligence and Security Command, U.S. Central Command, the Office of the Staff Judge Advocate and with the 4th Infantry Division at Fort Hood. After retiring, Ricci served as associate general counsel at the Department of Defense Education Activity from 2010 to 2012. She was also a member of the Fort Hood Independent Review Committee and Administrative Conference of the United States. She joined the United States Department of Agriculture in 2012 and served as assistant and associate general counsel for Marketing, Regulatory, and Food Safety Programs, and later Associate General Counsel for General Law.

President Joe Biden announced Ricci's nomination to be general counsel of the Army on September 21, 2021, followed by a formal nomination on September 27. Her nomination was reported out of the Senate Armed Services Committee on December 8, and she was confirmed in the Senate by voice vote on December 14. Ricci was sworn in on January 3, 2022.
