= William Thaddeus Coleman III =

American lawyer

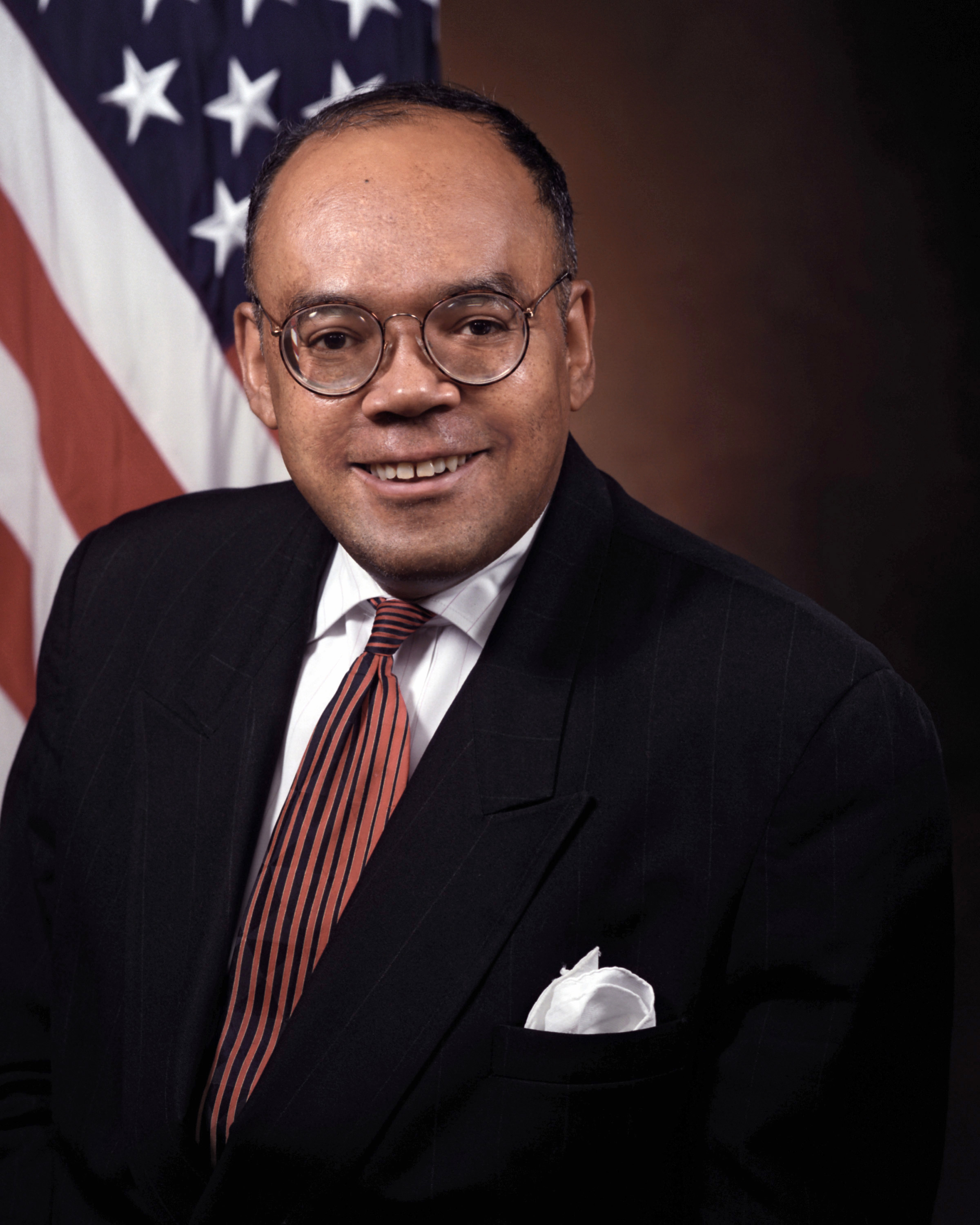
- Coleman in 1995

General Counsel of the Army
- In office 1994–1999
- President: Bill Clinton
- Preceded by: William J. Haynes II
- Succeeded by: Charles A. Blanchard

Personal details
- Born: 1947 (age 77–78) Boston, Massachusetts, U.S.
- Spouse: Allegra Saenz Coleman (m. 2003)
- Children: 2 biological, 4 stepchildren
- Parent(s): William Thaddeus Coleman Jr. Lovida Hardin
- Education: Williams College (BA); Yale University (JD)
- Profession: Lawyer

William Thaddeus Coleman III (born 1947) is an American lawyer who served as General Counsel of the Army during the Clinton administration.

== Biography ==
Coleman was born in Boston on April 20, 1947, the son of William Thaddeus Coleman Jr. and his wife Lovida. He was educated at Williams College (B.A., 1970), and Yale Law School (J.D., 1973). During his first year at law school, he was befriended by fellow law student Bill Clinton and the two were roommates during their second year of law school. After completing law school, he served as a clerk for federal District Judge Edward T. Gignoux.

Coleman was admitted to the bar of Georgia in 1974. In the 1990s, when Bill Clinton became President of the United States, he appointed Coleman General Counsel of the Army. Coleman was the subject of a minor scandal in 1997 when he was accused of sexual harassment. An investigation into the allegations by the Office of the Inspector General, U.S. Department of Defense later concluded that, while Coleman had told some off-color jokes, he had not committed sexual harassment.

Coleman married his wife, Allegra Saenz Coleman, in 2003, and together the couple have two children: William Thaddeus Coleman IV and Amadeus Alexander-Browne Coleman. He also has four stepchildren.

Government offices
Preceded by William J. Haynes, II	General Counsel of the Army; 1994 – ca. 1999	Succeeded by Charles A. Blanchard
