= Jill Wine-Banks =

American lawyer

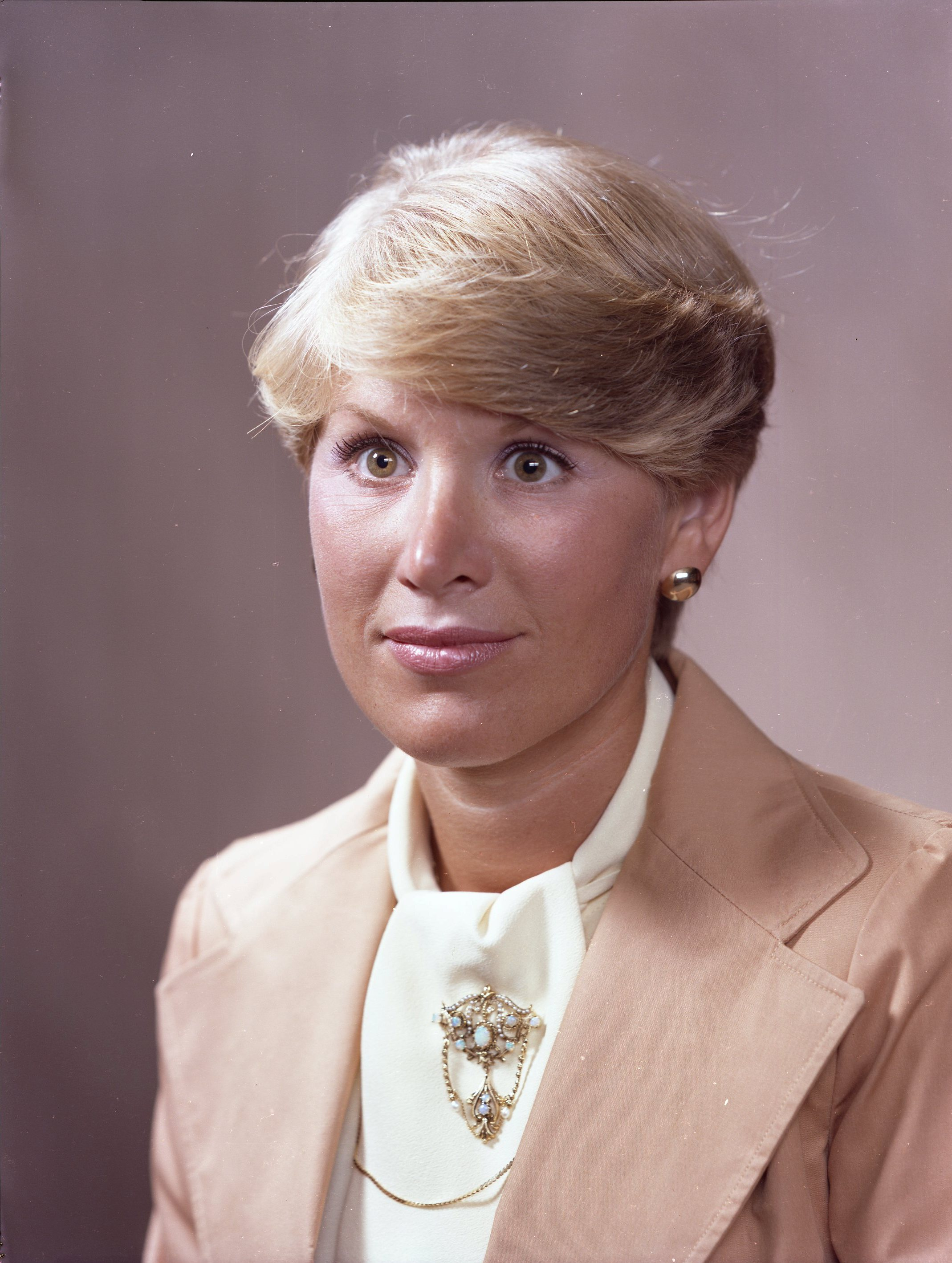
- Wine-Banks in 1977

General Counsel of the Army
- In office 1977–1980
- President: Jimmy Carter
- Preceded by: Charles D. Ablard
- Succeeded by: Sara E. Lister

Personal details
- Born: Jill Susan Wine; May 5, 1943 (age 82) Chicago, Illinois, U.S.
- Occupation: Lawyer
- Known for: Watergate prosecutor who cross-examined Rose Mary Woods about the Watergate tapes; First woman to hold the position of U.S. General Counsel of the Army; First woman to hold the position of the executive director of the American Bar Association
- Website: jillwinebanks.com

Jill Wine-Banks (born May 5, 1943, as Jill Susan Wine), formerly Jill Wine-Volner, is an American lawyer who was one of the prosecutors during the Watergate scandal. She was the first woman to serve as US General Counsel of the Army (1977–80) under President Jimmy Carter. She is also the first woman to have held the position of executive director of the American Bar Association.

== Early life and education ==
Jill Wine was born to a family of Jewish immigrants in Chicago, Illinois on May 5, 1943, as Jill Susan Wine. Her parents were Bert S. Wine and Sylvia Dawn (née Simon) Wine. She was raised in Chicago, where her father was a Certified Public Accountant. She was educated at the University of Illinois at Urbana–Champaign, receiving a B.S. in Communication studies and was president of her chapter of Iota Alpha Pi, and at Columbia Law School, receiving a J.D. in 1968. After her marriage to Ian Volner, also a lawyer, she practiced law as Jill Wine-Volner.

== Career ==
After law school, Wine-Volner joined the United States Department of Justice, becoming one of the first female attorneys in the organized crime section. During the Watergate scandal, she served on the staff of special prosecutor Leon Jaworski. In that capacity, in the proceedings before Judge John Sirica, she was responsible for cross-examining President of the United States Richard Nixon's secretary Rose Mary Woods about the 18 1/2 minute gap on the Watergate tapes. Wine-Volner was given the task of cross-examining Woods after a colleague made an inappropriate remark to the press. During cross-examination, Wine-Volner had Woods recreate the way in which Woods claimed she accidentally erased a portion of the tape when she was transcribing it. Woods had claimed to have kept her foot on the pedal on the tape recorder, and Wine-Volner succeeded in demonstrating that this was implausible.

Wine-Volner received media attention during the trial for her legal tactics and fashion choices; critics disapproved of her wearing miniskirts.

After Watergate, Wine-Volner joined a Washington, D.C., law firm. In 1977, President Jimmy Carter nominated her to serve as General Counsel of the Army, and she subsequently held that post until 1980. She was the first woman to hold the position of General Counsel of the Army. After divorcing Ian Volner, in 1980 she married her boyfriend from their high school days, Michael Banks, an antiques dealer living in Winnetka, Illinois, and changed her name to Jill Wine-Banks.

In 1980, at the behest of Albert E. Jenner, Jr., who had served on the staff of the Republicans on the House Judiciary Committee during Watergate and who had been impressed with her in-court performance, she became a partner at the Chicago law firm of Jenner & Block.

In 1987, she became the executive director of the American Bar Association, the first woman to hold that position. In 1989, there was a minor scandal after Wine-Banks persuaded the Illinois Attorney General's office, of which Wine-Banks had once been the second in command, to assign a prosecutor to investigate a veterinarian who she believed had negligently treated her Dalmatian, leading to the dog's death. After the Chicago Tribune ran a story titled "Grieving Dog Owner Unleashes Clout with State", a former ABA president, Eugene Thomas, circulated a letter in which he said that Wine-Banks "does not understand the use of power and lacks a sense of decorum and propriety in professional matters" and should be dismissed by the ABA. She left the ABA in 1990.

In 1992, Wine-Banks joined Motorola as a director and vice president, a position she held until 2000. From 1997 to 2000, she was also a vice president of Maytag. In 2001, she founded and was the chief executive officer of Winning Workplaces, a human resources firm. She left Winning Workplaces in 2003 and joined the Chicago Public Schools as chief officer for career and technical education, a post she held until 2008. Since November 2008, Wine-Banks has worked as a consultant with F & H Solutions.

Wine-Banks also has a robust career providing legal analyst commentary on MSNBC. She hosts two podcasts, SistersinLaw along with Boston Globe columnist and former lawyer Kimberly Atkins Stohr and former U.S. Attorneys Barbara McQuade and Joyce Vance, and Intergenerational Politics, which will be produced by Politicon.

== Personal life ==
Wine-Banks's marriage to Ian Volner ended in divorce. She then married antiques dealer Michael Banks.

== Books ==
- Wine-Banks, Jill (2020). The Watergate Girl: My Fight for Truth and Justice Against a Criminal President. New York: Henry Holt and Company. ISBN 9781250244321. OCLC 1113434676.

Government offices
| Preceded by Charles D. Ablard | General Counsel of the Army; 1977–1980 | Succeeded by Sara E. Lister |
