= Charles D. Ablard =

United States lawyer

- Born: October 25, 1930 (age 95); Enid, Oklahoma, U.S.
- Education: University of Oklahoma (BBA, LLB); George Washington University (LLM)

Charles D. Ablard (born October 25, 1930) is a United States lawyer who served as General Counsel of the Army from 1975 to 1977, and who has been an administrative judge in the United States Department of Defense since 2003. He retired in 2009 and has since been involved in volunteer activities in fields of diplomacy and historic preservation in Washington DC and Alexandria, Virginia.

== Biography ==
Charles D. Ablard was born on October 25, 1930, in Enid, Oklahoma. He was educated at the University of Oklahoma, receiving a bachelor's degree in business administration and the University of Oklahoma College of Law, receiving an LL.B. in 1954. From 1954 to 1956, he served as a judge advocate officer in the United States Air Force Judge Advocate General's Corps, with assignments in Japan and at the Air University at Maxwell Air Force Base. He then attended the George Washington University Law School, receiving an LL.M. in 1959.

Professionally, Ablard practiced law as a partner in the Washington, D.C. law firm of Ablard & Harrison; as General Counsel and Congressional Liaison for the United States Information Agency; Vice-President and Counsel for the Magazine Publishers Association, Inc., and the American Society of Magazine Editors; Special Counsel to the American Bar Association's Special Committee on Legal Services and Procedure; and Judicial Officer of the United States Post Office and chairman of the Post Office's Board of Contract Appeals. In the course of his practice in the 1960s, Ablard became a recognized expert on U.S. administrative law, and was the founder of the American Bar Association's Administrative Law News newsletter in 1962.

In 1972, Ablard joined the United States Department of Justice as associate deputy attorney general. In 1975, President of the United States Gerald Ford nominated Ablard to be General Counsel of the Army and, after Senate confirmation, he held this position from February 25, 1975, until January 19, 1977.

From 1980 to 1984, Ablard was a member of the Board for International Broadcasting. He later became a partner at the Washington, D.C. law firm of Gage & Tucker.

In 2003, United States Secretary of Defense Donald Rumsfeld appointed Ablard to the United States Department of Defense's Office of Hearings and Appeals.

== Works by Charles D. Ablard ==
- "Some Comparisons Between the Council on Tribunals and the Administrative Conference of the United States", The American Journal of Comparative Law (1976)
- "Judicial Review of National Security Decisions: United States and United Kingdom", William and Mary Law Review, Vol. 27, Issue 4 (1986)

Government offices
Preceded by Robert W. Berry	General Counsel of the Army; February 25, 1975 – January 19, 1977	Succeeded by Jill Wine-Banks
