= General Counsel of the Department of the Air Force =

Chief civilian lawyer of the U.S. Air Force

- SAF/GC
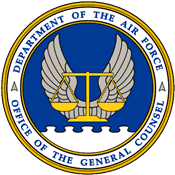
- Seal of the Office of the General Counsel

- Flag of the general counsel and assistant secretaries of the Air Force

- Incumbent; William K. Lane III since January 2026
- Department of the Air Force
- Style: The Honorable
- Reports to: Secretary of the Air Force; Under Secretary of the Air Force
- Seat: The Pentagon, Arlington County, Virginia, United States
- Nominator: The president with Senate advice and consent
- Term length: No fixed term
- Constituting instrument: 10 U.S.C. § 9019
- Formation: 1947
- First holder: Brackley Shaw
- Succession: 18th in SecDef succession by seniority of appointment
- Deputy: Principal Deputy General Counsel of the Air Force
- Salary: Executive Schedule, level IV
- Website: Official website

The general counsel of the Department of the Air Force (acronym SAF/GC) is the chief legal officer of the U.S. Department of the Air Force.

By U.S. law, the general counsel of the Department of the Air Force is appointed from civilian life by the president of the United States upon the advice and consent of the United States Senate, and performs such duties as the secretary of the Air Force specifies. According to Secretary of the Air Force Order No. 111.5, dated July 14, 2005, "The General Counsel is the chief legal officer and chief ethics official of the Department of the Air Force. Legal opinions issued by the Office of the General Counsel shall be the controlling opinions of the Department of the Air Force. The General Counsel provides advice in accordance with applicable statues on any legal subject and on other matters as directed by the Secretary." In other words, the general counsel advises the secretary of the Air Force, the under secretary, and the assistant secretaries, as well as the chief of staff of the Air Force, chief of space operations, and other military leaders of the United States Air Force and United States Space Force on legal matters, other than those statutory duties under the Uniform Code of Military Justice performed by the judge advocate general of the Air Force. The general counsel is also the ex officio governor of Wake Island and in charge of the territory's civil administration.

== List of general counsels of the Department of the Air Force (incomplete list) ==
Image	Name	Assumed office	Left office	President appointed by	Secretary served under
	Brackley Shaw	1947	1949	Harry S. Truman	W. Stuart Symington
	William T. Thurman	1950	1950	Harry S. Truman	W. Stuart Symington, Thomas K. Finletter
	James T. Hill Jr.	1950	1952	Harry S. Truman	Thomas K. Finletter
	John Alvin Johnson	1952	1958	Dwight Eisenhower	Thomas K. Finletter, Harold E. Talbott, Donald A. Quarles, James H. Douglas Jr.
	Max Golden	1958	1962	Dwight Eisenhower, John F. Kennedy	James H. Douglas Jr., Dudley C. Sharp, Eugene M. Zuckert
	Gerritt W. Wesselink	1964	1965	Lyndon B. Johnson	Eugene M. Zuckert
	Stephen N. Shulman	1965	1966	Lyndon Johnson	Eugene M. Zuckert, Harold Brown
	J. William Doolittle	1966	1968	Lyndon Johnson	Harold Brown
	John M. Steadman	1968	1970	Lyndon Johnson, Richard Nixon	Harold Brown, Robert C. Seamans, Jr.
	Jack L. Stempler	1970	1977	Richard Nixon, Gerald Ford	Robert C. Seamans, Jr., John L. McLucas, James W. Plummer, Thomas C. Reed,
	Peter B. Hamilton	1977	1978	Jimmy Carter	John C. Stetson
	Stuart R. Reichart	1979	1981	Jimmy Carter	John C. Stetson, Hans M. Mark, Verne Orr
	David E. Place	1981	1984	Ronald Reagan	Verne Orr
	Eugene R. Sullivan	1984	1986	Ronald Reagan	Verne Orr, Russell A. Rourke
	Kathleen A. Buck	1986	1987	Ronald Reagan	Russell A. Rourke, Edward C. Aldridge, Jr.
	Anne N. Foreman	1987	1989	Ronald Reagan	Edward C. Aldridge, Jr.
	Ann C. Petersen	1989	1993	George H. W. Bush	Donald B. Rice
	Gilbert F. Casellas	1993	1994	Bill Clinton	Sheila E. Widnall
	Sheila C. Cheston	1995	1998	Bill Clinton	Sheila E. Widnall
	Jeh Charles Johnson	1998	2001	Bill Clinton	F. Whitten Peters
	Mary L. Walker	2001	2008	George W. Bush	James G. Roche, Michael Wynne
	Charles A. Blanchard	2009	2013	Barack Obama	Michael B. Donley
	Joseph M. McDade Jr. (acting)	2013	2014	Barack Obama	Deborah Lee James
	Gordon O. Tanner	2014	2017	Barack Obama	Deborah Lee James
	Joseph M. McDade Jr. (acting)	2017	2018	Donald Trump	Lisa Disbrow; Heather Wilson
	Thomas E. Ayres	2018	2021	Donald Trump	Heather Wilson; Matthew Donovan (acting); Barbara Barrett
	Craig A. Smith (acting)	2021	2022	Joe Biden	John P. Roth (acting); Frank Kendall III
	Peter Beshar	2022	2025	Joe Biden	Frank Kendall III
	Shannon McGuire (acting)	2025	2026	Donald Trump	Troy Meink
	William K. Lane III	2026	Present	Donald Trump	Troy Meink

== See also ==
- General Counsel of the Department of Defense
- General Counsel of the Army
- General Counsel of the Navy
