= John G. Adams =

American politician

John Gibbons Adams (23 March 1912 – 26 June 2003) was the US Army's counsel in the Army-McCarthy Hearings. He was an Army veteran of World War II, and he worked in Washington, DC for the Defense Department before he became the US Army general counsel in 1953. From 1953 to 1955 he was the chief legal adviser to Army Secretary Robert T. Stevens.

== Publications ==
- Adams, John G. (1983). Without Precedent: The Story of the Death of McCarthyism. W. W. Norton & Company. ISBN 0-393-30230-X.

Government offices
Preceded by Bernard A. Monaghan	General Counsel of the Army; October 1, 1953 – March 31, 1955	Succeeded by Frank Millard
