= Equal Justice for United States Military Personnel legislation =

Since 2005, federal legislation has been introduced in the 109th Congress, 110th Congress, 111th Congress, 112th Congress, 113th Congress, 114th Congress, and 115th Congresses to amend Title 28 United States Code section 1259 to allow members of the United States Armed Forces to appeal court-martial convictions when the Court of Appeals for the Armed Forces denies a petition for grant of review or extraordinary relief. In the 112th Congress the Equal Justice for Our Military Act of 2011, H.R. 3133 was introduced in the House of Representatives and the Equal Justice for Our Military Act of 2011, S. 1664 was introduced in the Senate. No actions were taken on either bill.A version of the bill was re-introduced by Rep. Susan A. Davis (D-Calif.) yearly until the year before her departure from Congress in 2021. The law was eventually changed as part of the National Defense Authorization Act for Fiscal Year 2024. However, the Supreme Court still lacks administrative authority over the CAAF, including over contempt of court and attorney discipline cases. Advocates continue to argue for an expansion of the Supreme Court's jurisdiction to hear these matters.

== Controversy over Supreme Court access ==
Since the establishment of the Supreme Court by the United States Constitution in 1789, Congress has not allowed service members direct appeal to the nation’s highest federal court should the service member be convicted by courts-martial. In 1950 Congress created the modern military justice system by enacting, in 1951, the Uniform Code of Military Justice. In 1984 Congress passed the Military Justice Act of 1983, that gave service members limited access to the Supreme Court. Under existing law, Title 28 United States Code section 1259, a service member may appeal to the Supreme Court in death penalty cases or if review is granted by the Court of Appeals for the Armed Forces (CAAF) - which happens about twenty percent of the time. Also, the government can appeal any ruling in which the service member prevails by having the individual service judge advocate general certify an issue for appeal.

CAAF, as initially established in 1951 (known then as "Court of Military Appeals") was the final authority on cases arising under the military justice system, except for a limited number of cases considered by the Supreme Court under collateral proceedings, such as through writs of habeas corpus.

In March 2004, Norbert Basil MacLean III, a former United States Navy cryptologist, began to petition Congress to permit all court-martialed service members access to the Supreme Court. Under MacLean's proposal, which Rep Davis (D-Calif.) and Senator Feinstein (D-Calif.) adapted as introduced bills in the House of Representatives and Senate, service members would be able to access the nation's highest court if CAAF denied a grant of review or relief in extraordinary writ and writ-appeal cases.

An August 2006 report issued by the American Bar Association (ABA) showed that ninety percent of all court-martialed service members whose cases were eligible for review by the court could not have Supreme Court review because the court had either denied a grant of a petition for review or denied extraordinary relief. The ABA called on Congress in 2006 to change the law and permit all court-martialed service members the right of review in the high court.

== 109th Congress ==
- H.R. 1364 Equal Justice for Our Military Personnel Act, 2005, 109th Congress (referred to committee—did not pass)

On April 23, 2004, the House Armed Services Committee sent a bipartisan letter, written by Reps. Davis (D-Calif.) and John Michael McHugh (R-NY), to The Pentagon asking for feedback on MacLean's proposal. Then-Principal Deputy General Counsel Daniel J. Dell'Orto wrote to lawmakers opposing MacLean's proposal of Supreme Court access for service members. According to the Los Angeles Daily Journal, Dell'Orto stated that changing the law and giving service members greater Supreme Court access would only serve to burden the nation's highest court. Rep. Davis first introduced the Equal Justice for Our Military Act on March 17, 2005, in the 109th Congress. After its introduction the bill was opposed by the Bush administration through then-Department of Defense General Counsel William J. Haynes II. Haynes wrote to Congress in opposition stating "there is no apparent justification to modify the current review process, thereby increasing the burden upon the Supreme Court and counsel to address the myriad of matters that would be encountered with expanded certiorari jurisdiction." The bill failed in the 109th Congress.

At the behest of MacLean, Legislative Research Inc. ("LRI"), based in California, developed two decades of military justice statistics to present to Congress. LRI completed its study in March 2006. In August 2006, the American Bar Association ("ABA") issued a report and unanimously passed a resolution urging Congress to correct the law and permit U.S. armed forces members equal access to the Supreme Court. The ABA report references military justice statistics compiled as a direct result of MacLean's work on this issue noting that: "CAAF denies petitions for grant of review and petitions for relief far more often than it grants them. While there is significant variation from year to year, in 2004-05, petitions for review were denied in 78.3 percent (581) of the cases and granted in 19.54 percent (145) of the cases. Petitions for grants of extraordinary relief were denied in 70.45 percent (31) of the cases and granted in 4.55 percent (2) of the cases. Equally sobering, the statistical compilation reveals that during the same time-period, there were 7,564 court-martial convictions and only 799 petitions for grant of review granted by CAAF."

== 110th Congress ==
Reps. Susan A. Davis, (D-Calif.) and Ike Skelton (D-Mo.) of the House Armed Services Committee reintroduced the bill that had previously failed in the last Congress entitled the Equal Justice for Our Military Act of 2007, H.R. 3174. The reintroduced bill was in broader form and included not only denials for extraordinary writs but also petitions for direct review. It would amend 28 U.S.C. sections 1259(3) and (4) so that if the Court of Appeals denied review or relief to a service member an appeal could be taken to the Supreme Court. Six days after H.R. 3174's introduction, it received bipartisan support by Rep. Rodney Alexander (R-La.), a U.S. Air Force Reserve veteran, who signed on as cosponsor.

=== Senate Judiciary markup's bill and favorably reports it to full Senate ===
On September 17, 2007, a companion bill, identical to the House bill, was introduced in the Senate by Senators Feinstein (D-Calif.), then-Republican Arlen Specter, and Russ Feingold (D-Wis.), entitled Equal Justice for United States Military Personnel Act of 2007. When the Senate returned from its 2008 summer recess, Senator Hillary Clinton (D-NY), a member of the Senate Armed Services Committee, signed on as cosponsor to the bill. On September 11, 2008 the Senate Judiciary Committee unanimously voted to approve S. 2052. The next day S. 2052 was placed on the Legislative Calendar of the Senate.

=== House suspends rules and passes its version of bill ===
On September 27, 2008, the House of Representatives debated and passed, by two-thirds voice vote, the Equal Justice for Our Military Act of 2007, H.R. 3174. Rep. Lamar S. Smith (R-Tx.), the Ranking Republican on the House Judiciary Committee opposed the bill during floor debate arguing, among other things, that there were no hearings in the House Judiciary Committee. It was expected that the U.S. Senate would take up the House passed H.R. 3174 during the week of December 8, 2008. However, several print media and blogs had reported opposition by at least one Republican Senator who blocked a Senate floor vote on the bill.

== 111th Congress ==
Early in the 111th Congress two identical bills were introduced in both the U.S. House of Representatives and Senate to give servicemembers the same right to appeal to the U.S. Supreme Court as civilian citizens. On January 15, 2009, Rep. Davis (D-Calif.) Chairwoman of the House Armed Services Subcommittee on Military Personnel|Subcommittee on Military Personnel of the House Armed Services Committee reintroduced the bill in the 111th Congress as the Equal Justice for Our Military Act of 2009, H.R. 569. H.R. 569 was referred to the House Judiciary Committee. Identical legislation was also introduced on January 30, 2009, when Senators Feinstein (D-Calif.), then-Republican Arlen Specter and Russ Feingold (D-Wis.) reintroduced the Senate bill in the 111th Congress as the Equal Justice for United States Military Personnel Act of 2009, S. 357. The language of the reintroduced bills were the same as the previous bills in 110th Congress. Both the House and Senate bills were also the same language as MacLean first proposed to Congress in 2004.

In March 2009 before a joint session of the House and Senate Veterans' Affairs Committees, Ira Novoselsky, the national commander of the Jewish War Veterans of the United States of America announced that JWV was making the House bill and the issue of Supreme Court access for service members a legislative priority. Novoselsky asked the Veteran's Committee to weigh in on the important issue and stated that "JWV supports legislation that will restore due process and equal treatment under the law for our service members and veterans".

=== House subcommittee hearing ===
On June 11, 2009, the Subcommittee on Courts and Competition Policy of the U.S. House Committee on the Judiciary held a hearing on H.R. 569. Witnesses who appeared before the subcommittee included retired Army Major General John D. Alternburg, Jr., Rep. Davis, and attorney Dwight H. Sullivan. Davis and Sullivan testified in support of the bill. Altenburg testified in opposition of the bill.

On July 30, 2009, the House Subcommittee on Courts and Competition Policy held a mark up on H.R. 569 and approved the bill for full House Judiciary Committee action.

=== House Judiciary Committee markup, favorable report issued and placed on Union Calendar ===
On January 27, 2010, the full House Judiciary Committee, by voice vote, favorably reported H.R. 569 to the House of Representatives.

On July 14, 2010, a U.S. House of Representatives Report was filed which amended H.R. 569 and changed its name to the Equal Justice for Our Military Act of 2010. H.R. 569 was placed on the Union Calendar of the U.S. House of Representatives. The House Report refers to MacLean in footnotes. One in particular states that "during the full Committee mark-up of H.R. 569, Members of the Minority charged that the bill was introduced primarily for the benefit of a single individual, former Navy Officer Norbert Basil MacLean III. In fact, a number of individuals and organizations have taken note of the inherent injustice of the current law. Additionally, it should be pointed out that H.R. 569 applies only to courts-martial that were initiated on or after the effective date of the Act, which thereby forecloses any personal benefit to Mr. MacLean, whose court-martial was concluded well before this legislation was introduced."

== 112th-115th Congresses ==
The Equal Justice for Our Military Act of 2011 was re-introduced in the 112th, 113th, 114th and 115th Congresses by Rep. Susan A. Davis [D-CA-53]. Each rendition of the bill was introduced and referred to committee, going no further in the process. Rep. Davis did not submit a bill in the 116th Congress (2019-2020). On September 4th 2019, Davis announced she would not run for re-election and departed from office on January 3rd 2021.

== Congressional Research Service reports ==
On October 6, 2008, the Congressional Research Service (CRS) issued a report entitled "Supreme Court Appellate Jurisdiction Over Military Court Cases." The CRS report noted that under existing law the CAAF "functions as a gatekeeper for military appellants' access to Supreme Court review." The report further noted that "if the CAAF denies an appeal, the U.S. Supreme Court will typically lack the authority to review the decision. In contrast, criminal appellants in Article III courts have an automatic right of appeal to federal courts of appeals and then a right to petition the Supreme Court for review." On January 30, 2009, the CRS issued a second report also entitled "Supreme Court Appellate Jurisdiction Over Military Court Case." This CRS report discusses HR 569 in the 111th Congress.

== Congressional Budget Office costings ==
The United States Congressional Budget Office (CBO) issued a cost estimate on October 22, 2008, regarding the Equal Justice for United States Military Personnel Act of 2007, S.2052, 110th Congress. The CBO estimated costs to be approximately $1 million a year if S.2052 was enacted which would include the workload of Department of Defense attorneys and Supreme Court clerks. Further it estimates a possible additional $1 million to $2 million in appropriated funds for the Department of Defense to defend a case in the Supreme Court if a servicemember petitioned the high court for a writ of certiorari. However, the CBO determined that by enacting S.2052 there would be no direct spending and it would impose no costs on local, state or tribal governments.

On October 27, 2008, the Press-Enterprise noted in an article that the cost to the average family if S.2052 was enacted would be $0.16. On the topic of costs related to an increase in workload, the American Bar Association stated in a letter to House leaders that "to those that argue that permitting equal access to the courts will create workload problems, we emphatically respond that nothing is more important than the provision of fundamental due process to our service members."

On June 11, 2009, Washington, DC attorney Dwight H. Sullivan testified before a House Judiciary subcommittee that the costs, should HR 569 (111th Congress) be passed, would be approximately $1,000 per case.

On February 2, 2010, the CBO issued a cost estimate on HR 569. The CBO's estimate indicates that "Based on information provided by the Department of Defense (DoD) and the Supreme Court, CBO estimates that implementing the bill would increase the workload of DoD attorneys and Supreme Court clerks and would cost less than $1 million each year, assuming the availability of appropriated funds. We expect that the bill would make several hundred service members eligible to file petitions each year, but that only a small portion of those individuals would pursue review by the Supreme Court (based on the experience of individuals whose cases currently qualify for Supreme Court review). CBO cannot predict whether the Supreme Court would grant review of any particular petition. If the Supreme Court agreed to review any petitions, DoD would probably spend no more than $1 million in any year from appropriated funds to defend those cases. (Any such amounts would depend on the number and complexity of such cases.) Enacting H.R. 569 would not affect direct spending or revenues." The February 2010 estimate was considerably less in estimated costs compared to the previous CBO estimate in 2008.

== What others have said about the legislation ==
The major opponents and proponents of the legislation are:

=== Major opponents to the legislation ===
The following are opponents to the legislation and have either testified before Congress or sent letters in opposition which are part of the Congressional record:

==== William J. Haynes II ====
In 2002 the Army Times editorial board was critical of the Department of Defense (DoD) trying to prevent servicemembers from accessing the federal courts regarding military personnel issues. William J. Haynes II had submitted various proposals to Congress, in the DoD 2002 budget proposal, to not allow service members access to the federal courts to challenge military personnel issues such as promotions, retention actions, separations, retirement, enlistments and re-enlistments.

A front page article in the Los Angeles Daily Journal reported that Haynes opposed giving members of the U.S. Armed Forces access to the Supreme Court of the United States if they are court-martialed. In February 2006, he wrote letters to Congress opposing the Equal Justice for Our Military Act, which was pending in the 109th Congress. Haynes opined that "there is no apparent justification to modify the current review process, thereby increasing the burden upon the Supreme Court and counsel to address the myriad of matters that would be encountered with expanded certiorari jurisdiction." The next month, in March 2006, Navy veteran Norbert Basil MacLean III lobbied lawmakers with twenty-two years of military justice statistics showing that over 80 percent of all court-martialed service members are shut out of seeking U.S. Supreme Court review. In August 2006, the American Bar Association issued a report and passed a resolution urging Congress to give servicemembers Supreme Court access.

In July 2007 Representative Susan A. Davis (D-Calif.) reintroduced the Equal Justice for Our Military Act of 2007, HR.3174. And in September 2007 Senators Dianne Feinstein and Arlen Specter introduced bipartisan identical legislation entitled the Equal Justice for United States Military Personnel Act of 2007, S.2052 in the Senate. On September 27, 2008, during floor debate on HR 3174 in the U.S. House of Representatives Rep. Lamar S. Smith (R-Texas) cited a February 6, 2006, Haynes letter in support of his opposition to servicemembers having equal access to the U.S. Supreme Court. After debate the House passed HR 3174 by voice vote of a two-thirds majority.

==== Lamar Smith ====
On September 27, 2008, Representative Lamar S. Smith (R-Texas) in a House floor debate on the Equal Justice for Our Military Act of 2007, HR 3174, opposed granting access to the Supreme Court of the United States to members of the U.S. Armed Forces. Smith had argued, among other things, that there had been no hearings in the House Judiciary Committee on the subject and for this and other reasons he opposed the legislation being considered on the House suspension calendar. In his floor debate, Smith cited a February 6, 2006, letter of former Department of Defense General Counsel William J. Haynes II, who also opposed access of servicemembers to the Supreme Court. HR 3174 subsequently passed in the House by a two-thirds voice vote.

=== Proponents of the legislation ===
The following are proponents to the legislation and have either testified before Congress or sent letters in support which are part of the Congressional record:

==== Norbert Basil MacLean III ====
After MacLean was precluded from Supreme Court access by operation of 28 U.S.C. 1259(4), and learning that other service members were also, he began his advocacy to change the law. MacLean first started to petition Members of the 108th Congress in March 2004 to amend the law and permit service members access to the Supreme Court. MacLean's proposal, which was included in the HASC letter to the Defense Department, was simple: to permit a petition for writ of certiorari to be filed by any member of the U.S. Armed Forces who was denied review or relief by the CAAF. This concept would bring the Armed Forces court in line with other federal Courts of Appeal concerning Supreme Court review of federal criminal convictions. MacLean's proposal would afford service members full procedural due process protections in appellate review of courts-martial to the Supreme Court.

===== MacLean's commentary calling on Congress to take action to allow service members court access =====
The Los Angeles Daily Journal, the San Francisco Daily Journal, the Los Angeles Times and the Legal Times published MacLean's commentary calling upon Congress to take action on pending bills allowing for service members to access the Supreme Court.

Date	Publication	Title
2009-03-20	Los Angeles Daily Journal and San Francisco Daily Journal	"Case Highlights Need for Action on Service Members' Court Access"
2008-09-10	Los Angeles Times	"Separate and unequal military justice"
2008-06-09	Legal Times	"Who Hears the Troops?"

===== Criticism of MacLean's position =====
U.S. Department of Defense officials in the George W. Bush administration were critical of MacLean's proposal to Congress. Department of Defense Principal Deputy General Counsel Daniel J. Dell'Orto indicated opposition to the issue of access to the Supreme Court for members of the U.S. Armed Forces. The House Armed Services Committee wrote a letter to the Defense Department attaching correspondence from MacLean on the inequity. Dell'Orto wrote back to the Armed Services committee criticizing MacLean's proposal for fear it would "increase the burden upon the Supreme Court." In 2006 then-Department of Defense General Counsel William J. Haynes II was critical of MacLean's proposal and indicated that the Bush administration opposes giving servicemembers equal access to the Supreme Court. In February 2006 Haynes opined to Congress that "there is no apparent justification to modify the current review process, thereby increasing the burden upon the Supreme Court and counsel to address the myriad of matters that would be encountered with expanded certiorari jurisdiction."

After the House of Representatives passed the Equal Justice for Our Military Act of 2007, Robert E. Reed, an associate general counsel at the Department of Defense in the George W. Bush administration told The New York Times the legislation would increase the burdens on the Supreme Court and Defense Department lawyers, adding that supporters were not taking a “panoramic view.” “A lot of those supporters are only looking at this as a motherhood, apple pie sort of issue,” he said. “There’s a logic and a rationale to this. We’re not just trying to be mean and difficult for the defendants.” Reed's comment to The New York Times may have been in response to MacLean's 2007 comment to the San Diego Union Tribune when he (MacLean) said "I think there is a high likelihood that this bill will pass because voting against it would be like voting against Mom and warm apple pie.” Finally, Reed told The New York Times “It’s the same old people with the same old arguments and the same propositions.”

===== Praise of MacLean's position =====
Despite critics in the George W. Bush administration, in 2005, the press secretary for Rep. Davis said in the Los Angeles Daily Journal that after considering MacLean's arguments, Davis believes both prosecution and defense should have equal opportunity to appeal to the Supreme Court. "He brought up a very important issue of equality under the law," Aaron Hunter, press secretary said.

The American Bar Association mentioned MacLean in its resolution and report to Congress in 2006 which urged the law be changed to permit members of the U.S. Armed Forces to have equal access to the Supreme Court. The ABA report references MacLean's work on military justice statistics.

During a 5 June 2009 House Judiciary subcommittee hearing on H.R. 569 (111th Congress), Rep. Davis made reference to MacLean in her testimony as "a tireless champion for this issue and other military justice reform on behalf of the service members and veterans that fall under the jurisdiction of those [military courts of appeal]."

=== Support of veteran's groups, legal associations and retired judges ===
The following organizations support service members' access to the Supreme Court:

- American Bar Association
- Fleet Reserve Association
- Jewish War Veterans of the United States of America
- Military Officers Association of America
- National Association of Criminal Defense Lawyers
- National Institute of Military Justice

Three retired chief judges of the Court of Appeals for the Armed Forces support the proposed legislation:

- Walter T. Cox III
- Robinson O. Everett
- Eugene R. Sullivan
