= Gordon O. Tanner =

American lawyer (born 1948)

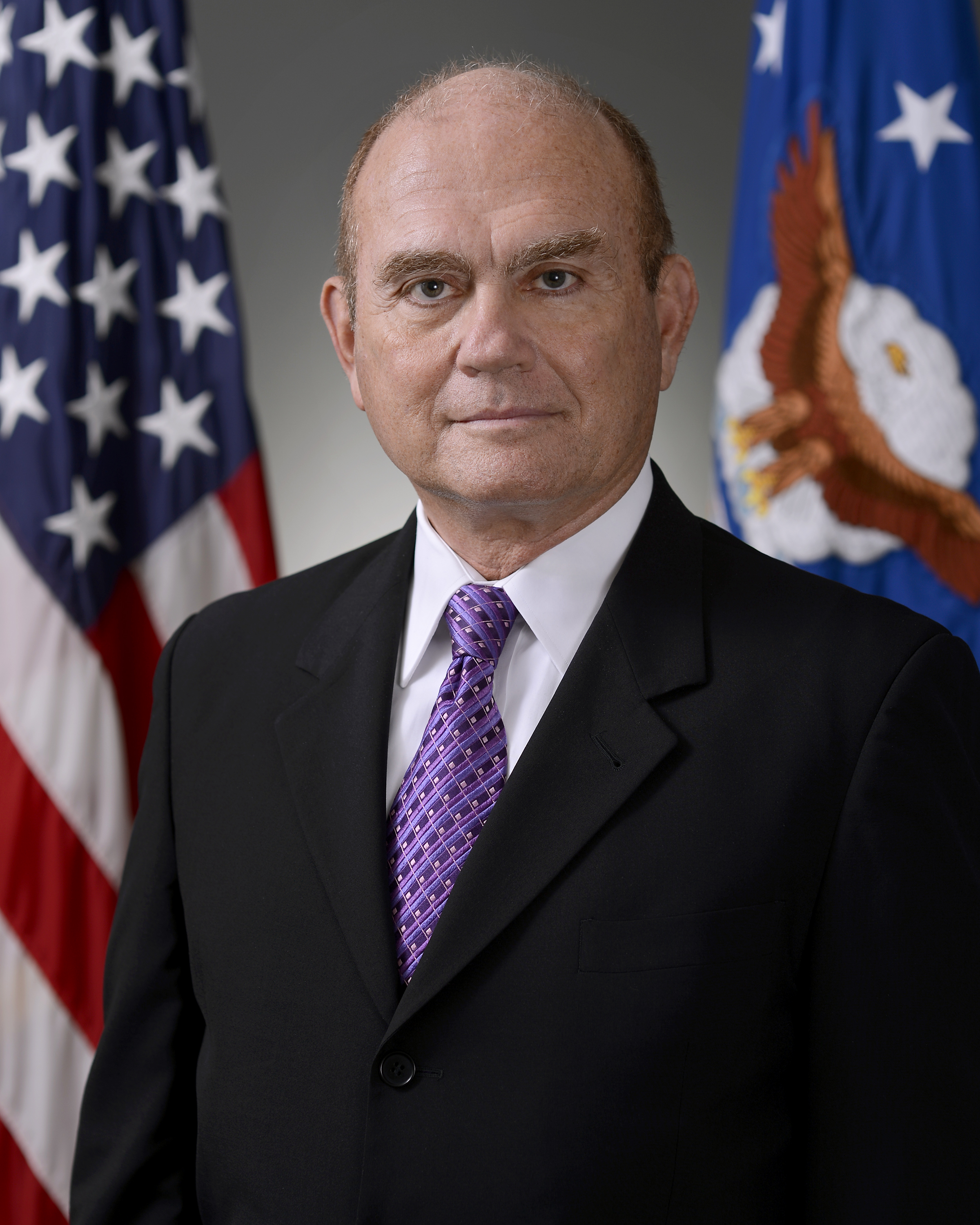

General Counsel of the United States Air Force
- In office September 2014 – January 2, 2017
- President: Barack Obama
- Secretary: Deborah Lee James
- Preceded by: Joseph M. McDade, Jr. (acting)
- Succeeded by: Joseph M. McDade, Jr. (acting)

Personal details
- Born: Gordon Owen Tanner; October 28, 1948 (age 77) Mobile, Alabama, U.S.
- Spouse: Robert L. Patlan
- Education: University of Alabama (BA); Vanderbilt University School of Law (JD)

Military service
- Branch/service: United States Air Force
- Years of service: 1973-2002
- Rank: Colonel
- Unit: Air Force Reserve; Air Force Judge Advocate General Corps

Gordon Owen Tanner (born October 28, 1948) is an American lawyer who served as the General Counsel of the Air Force, the chief legal officer of the U.S. Department of the Air Force, from 2014 to 2017. Tanner also served as the governor of Wake Island during the same period.

== Biography ==
He was born in Mobile, Alabama on October 28, 1948. He was educated at the University of Alabama, receiving a B.A. in political science in 1970. He then attended Vanderbilt University School of Law where he obtained his J.D. degree in 1973. He then served on active duty military service with the United States Air Force as a Judge Advocate assigned to Tyndall Air Force Base, Florida from 1973 until 1977. Following his active duty military service, he continued his military service in the United States Air Force Reserve until he retired as a colonel in 2002.

For his military service, he was awarded the Legion of Merit, Air Force Meritorious Service Medal with four oak leaf clusters, Air Force Decoration for Exceptional Civilian Service, Air Force Commendation Medal, Air Force Achievement Medal, Air Force Outstanding Unit Award, Armed Forces Reserve Medal, Air Force Longevity Service Award with device, and Air Force Training Ribbon.

In 1977, he joined the law firm of McDermott, Slepian, Windom & Reed in Mobile, Alabama, which firm later merged with Sirote & Permutt, where he remained as a partner in its corporate and real estate practice until 1997. In 2000, Tanner joined the Office of the Air Force General Counsel in its San Antonio, Texas office as Chief Counsel, Housing Division where he led that office until 2008. He became the Air Force Deputy General Counsel (Environment and Installations) in Washington, DC in 2008. He continued in that position until he was selected as the Air Force Deputy Assistant Secretary (Reserve Affairs) in 2011. In 2012 he was selected as the Air Force Principal Deputy General Counsel where he served until 2013 when he was named as the Air Force Principal Deputy Assistant Secretary (Manpower & Reserve Affairs).

President Barack Obama nominated Tanner as the Air Force General Counsel on April 7, 2014, and he was confirmed to that position by the United States Senate on September 16, 2014. He served as the Air Force General Counsel until January 21, 2017, where he provided oversight, guidance and direction for legal advice provided by more than 2,600 Department of the Air Force military and civilian lawyers worldwide. In addition, Tanner served as the governor of Wake Island from 2014 until 2017. Tanner was the first-ever presidential appointee confirmed by the Senate who was not only openly gay and married to a same-sex spouse, but also a military veteran.

Upon his retirement, he organized the consulting firm of Tanner Ford Battle LLC where he continues to provide strategic advice to business organizations that deal with the federal government.
