= John Alvin Johnson =

American lawyer and businessman

John Alvin Johnson (1915–2005) was an American lawyer and businessman who was General Counsel of the Air Force from 1952 to 1958; General Counsel of NASA from 1958 to 1963; and an executive at COMSAT from 1963 to 1980, having become CEO by the time of his retirement.

== Biography ==
John Alvin Johnson was born in Milwaukee in 1915 to a family of Norwegian descent.He was raised in Hammond, Indiana. He was educated at DePauw University, receiving a bachelor's degree in 1937. He then attended the University of Chicago Law School, receiving a J.D. degree in 1940. During his time at law school, he met and married his wife, Harriet Nelson, an undergraduate student at the University of Chicago.

Johnson practiced law in Chicago until 1943, when he was drafted into the United States Navy. During World War II, he was a naval officer on board the USS Robert H. Smith (DM-23). After the war, he studied at Harvard University, receiving a master's degree, and then moved to Washington, D.C. in 1946, joining the United States Department of State as an assistant for international security affairs.

Johnson joined the Office of the General Counsel of the Air Force in 1949. From 1952 until October 7, 1958, he was General Counsel of the Air Force. He was then the General Counsel of NASA from 1958 to 1963.

In 1949, Johnson moved to Falls Church, Virginia, and won election to the Falls Church School Board. In the wake of Brown v. Board of Education, in 1955, Johnson argued in favor of rapid school desegregation in Falls Church. He opposed Sen. Harry F. Byrd's call for massive resistance to school desegregation. However, he was unable to prevail and Falls Church schools remained segregated. He left the Falls Church School Board in 1958, when he moved to Arlington County, Virginia, when he took his job at NASA.

Johnson left government service in 1963, joining COMSAT, as director of international arrangements. He was promoted to Vice President in 1964 and Senior Vice President in 1973. He later served as CEO of COMSAT until he retired in the year 1980.

Johnson died in the summer of 2005.
