= William J. Haynes II =

American lawyer and politician

Jim Haynes
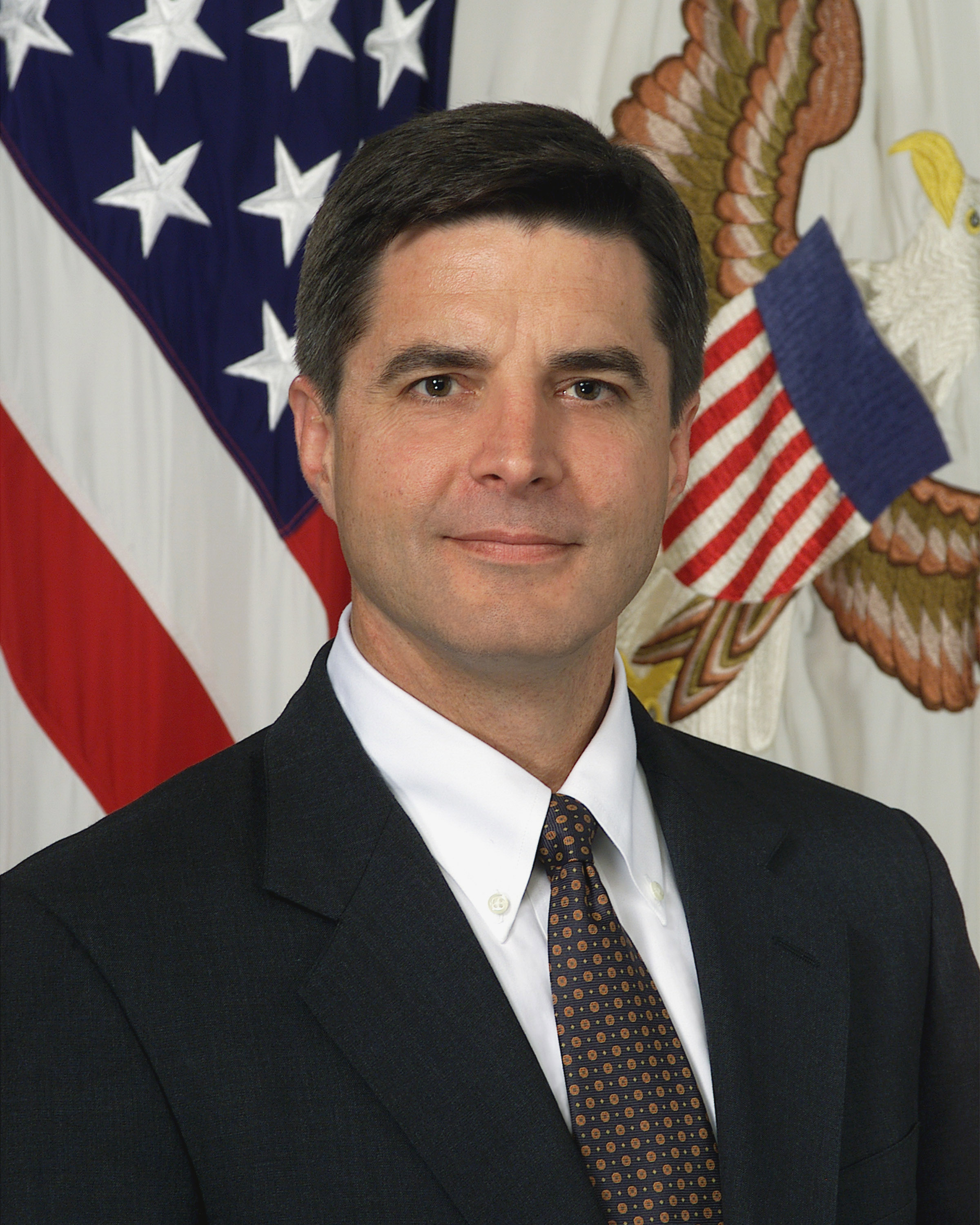

General Counsel of the Department of Defense
- In office May 24, 2001 – March 10, 2008
- President: George W. Bush
- Preceded by: Douglas Dworkin
- Succeeded by: Jeh Johnson

General Counsel of the Army
- In office 1990–1993
- President: George H. W. Bush
- Preceded by: Susan J. Crawford
- Succeeded by: William Thaddeus Coleman III

Personal details
- Born: William James Haynes II; March 30, 1958 (age 68) Waco, Texas, U.S.
- Party: Republican
- Education: Davidson College (BA); Harvard University (JD)

William James "Jim" Haynes II (born March 30, 1958) is an American lawyer and was General Counsel of the Department of Defense during much of 43rd President George W. Bush's administration and his war on terror. Haynes resigned as general counsel effective March 2008.

He had been general counsel of the Department of the Army during the administration of the 41st president, George H. W. Bush, a partner with the law firm of Jenner & Block, an associate general counsel of General Dynamics Corporation, and, beginning in 2008, chief corporate counsel of Chevron Corporation. Haynes is currently general counsel and executive vice president of SIGA Technologies, Inc.

== Childhood and education ==
Haynes was born in Waco, Texas, to William James Haynes and his wife. His family moved frequently during his childhood. He participated in the Boy Scouts while growing up, eventually achieving the rank of Eagle Scout. In 1976 Haynes graduated from Parkway High School in Bossier City, Louisiana, where he played tennis and won a state championship in wrestling.

Haynes earned an ROTC scholarship to attend Davidson College. During college Haynes played varsity tennis and was inducted into Phi Beta Kappa and Omicron Delta Kappa, and he graduated cum laude in 1980.

Haynes received his J.D. from Harvard Law School in 1983. During his second year at Harvard, Haynes volunteered at the Harvard Legal Aid Bureau. At the time, the president of the bureau was Deval Patrick, future Governor of Massachusetts, who was a year ahead of Haynes in law school.

Following law school, Haynes spent a year as a law clerk to U.S. District Judge James Bryan McMillan of the United States District Court for the Western District of North Carolina, an appointee of President Lyndon B. Johnson who famously ordered that the Charlotte-Mecklenburg County school system should integrate by means of crosstown busing.

== Early public service and private sector work ==
Following his clerkship, Haynes was commissioned an army second lieutenant through the ROTC program and entered active duty in 1984. He served four years, advising and representing the Department of the Army in matters ranging from international research and development agreements, to hazardous waste cleanups, to government contracts. Haynes was twice awarded the Army Meritorious Service Medal, in 1986 and again in 1988.

After leaving active duty, Haynes briefly worked as an associate at the D.C. law firm Sutherland Asbill & Brennan before being tapped by President George H. W. Bush to be general counsel of the Department of the Army. Haynes was confirmed in early 1990 and remained through noon of inauguration day in 1993, serving as chief legal officer of the army during the period of the conclusion of the Cold War, the liberation of Kuwait during Desert Shield and Desert Storm, and the beginning of the contraction of the defense industry.

In 1993, Haynes joined the D.C. office of Jenner & Block as a partner. Upon moving to General Dynamics Corporation in 1996, Haynes was initially staff vice president and associate general counsel, and later general counsel for the company's Marine Group. In early 1999, Haynes spent four months as a volunteer in central Asia working on microcredit programs for Mercy Corps International, before returning to his partnership at Jenner & Block.

== General Counsel of the Department of Defense ==
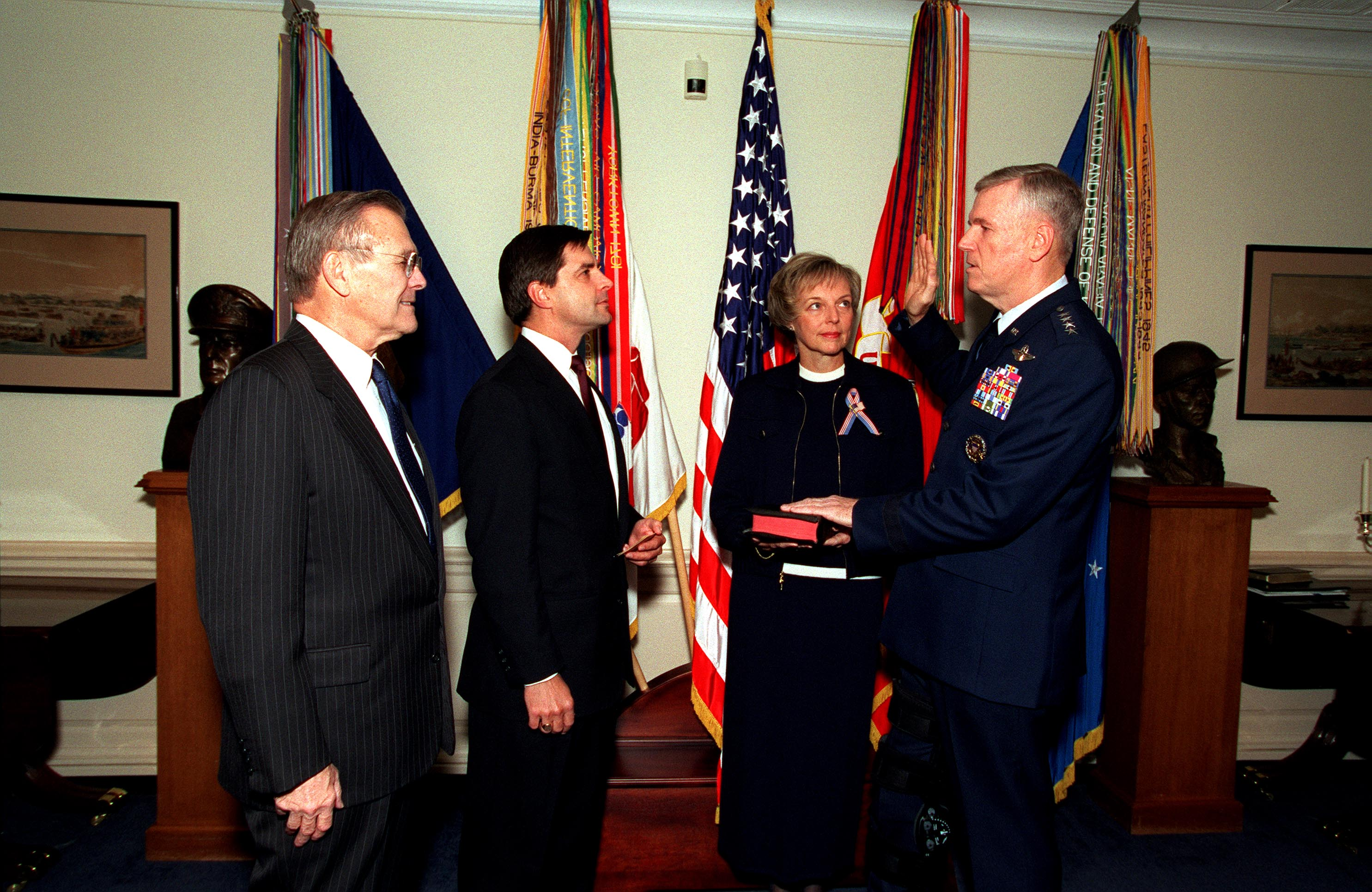
Haynes sworn in the incoming Chairman of the Joint Chiefs of Staff General Richard B. Myers at The Pentagon on October 1, 2001.

Shortly after his inauguration, President George W. Bush appointed Haynes to be General Counsel of the Department of Defense. Donald Rumsfeld was the 21st Secretary of Defense from 2001 to 2006 under President George W. Bush. In his capacity as general counsel, Haynes oversaw some 10,000 lawyers, and advised on the department's internal affairs and its relations with other government and non-government agencies at home and abroad. Because of the position's wide-ranging responsibility for overseeing thousands of ongoing cases, legislative matters, and policy decisions, the DoD's general counsel has been described as "one of the most powerful and influential lawyers in the entire federal government."

Haynes was in one of the Pentagon's command centers on September 11, 2001, when American Airlines Flight 77 crashed into the western face of the building. At the time, Haynes was on the far side of the Pentagon. Later, during the 2008 Lewis F. Powell, Jr. Lecture before the American College of Trial Lawyers, he recalled feeling "a shudder pulse the monstrous concrete structure," and that he sent a deputy of his to a survival site, in case any additional attacks were to affect the Pentagon.

As general counsel, Haynes was often sent to meet with foreign officials. In 2003, for instance, he met with British Attorney General Peter Goldsmith to discuss the cases of two British men held in Guantanamo Bay (a total of six British residents were held there). In 2007, Secretary of Defense Robert Gates dispatched Haynes to Turkey to speak with officials about militants in the country thought to be using U.S.-supplied weaponry.

Haynes also advised the Bush administration in its effort to create military commissions that would try detainees held at the Guantanamo Bay detention camp. The commissions were authorized by Military Commission Order No. 1, which Secretary of Defense Donald Rumsfeld issued on March 21, 2002. No detainees were tried under the provisions of that order. In 2006, the Supreme Court ruled in Hamdan v. Rumsfeld that the commissions were unconstitutional, and that congressional authorization was required before any commissions could commence.

Col. Morris Davis, the former chief prosecutor of military commissions at Guantanamo described how he was pressured into indicting Guantanamo prisoners for war crimes as soon as the Military Commissions Act was signed into law by Bush in October 2006 and even before the "Manual for Military Commissions" was prepared and no "convening authority" to oversee was appointed yet. His experience was that of receiving a call from Haynes as early as January 2007 asking him how quickly he could charge the Australian prisoner David Hicks.

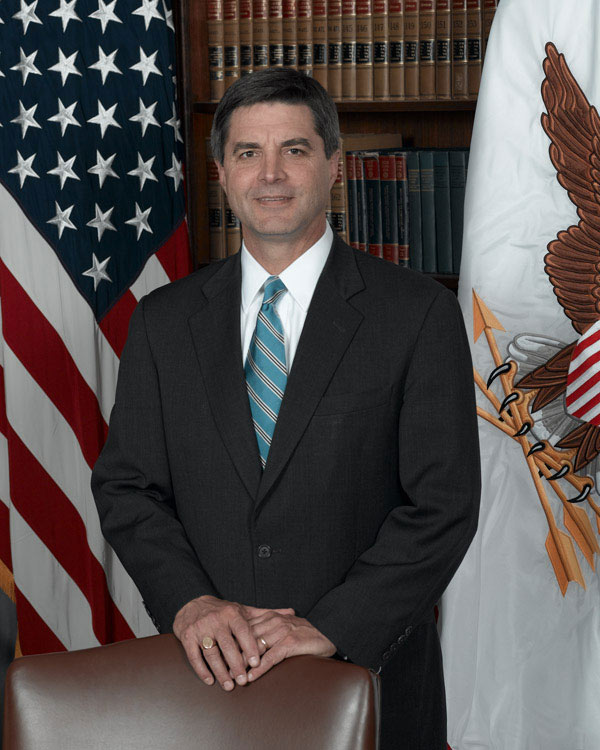
Haynes official Portrait during his tenure as United States Department of Defense General Counsel.

In chapter 13 (pp. 213–237) of her book The Dark Side, Jane Mayer describes how Alberto Mora, then the general counsel of the US Navy, as early as 2003 mounted a challenge to the interrogation policy used by the United States which he saw as potentially leading to war crimes charges. Mora reportedly warned Haynes, Donald Rumsfeld's chief counsel, to "protect your client!" To rebut Mora's and others' concerns about the legality of the conduct of the interrogation policy followed not only by DoD personnel but also by the CIA, Haynes apparently solicited an opinion from John C. Yoo, then in the Justice Department's Office of Legal Counsel, which opinion, in spite of being based on a questionable legal foundation, countenanced "enhanced interrogation techniques." For reasons which Haynes never disclosed, this opinion was adopted as official policy in spite of Mora's objections. Underlining his rebuke, Haynes never informed Mora that the policy adopted by the DoD took no account of Mora's objections.

Harvard law professor Jack Goldsmith, who briefly worked at the Pentagon as Special Counsel under Haynes before becoming head of the Office of Legal Counsel, United States Department of Justice (2003-2004), notes in his book, The Terror Presidency (2007), that at the time Haynes did urge the powers that be in the Bush administration to seek and obtain congressional authorization for the policy and military commissions, but that others in the administration felt doing so was unnecessary.

In November 2002, Haynes wrote a memo for Rumsfeld concerning interrogation techniques to be used at Guantanamo Bay. This followed what were known as the Torture Memos of August 2002, largely written by Yoo and issued by the Office of Legal Counsel to the CIA and DOD, with two signed as well by Jay S. Bybee. These also authorized the use of so-called "enhanced interrogation techniques," brutal interrogation tactics that are widely considered to be torture. Haynes's memo, which the Secretary of Defense approved, recommended authorizing several techniques, but advised against the authorization of three more-aggressive techniques, including one that resembled waterboarding. Such treatment of detainees, Haynes noted, would be inconsistent with American Armed Forces' "tradition of restraint."

That memo led journalist Stuart Taylor to write, in a 2008 article for the National Journal, that Haynes "is the only former [Bush administration] official whose paper trail also shows that he blocked a request to use waterboarding and two other harsh methods that administration lawyers had advised were legal...." Brookings Institution fellow Benjamin Wittes went further in the pages of The New Republic, claiming Haynes's memo was "the reason that the military, unlike the CIA, never waterboarded anybody."

While the memo was criticized for recommending techniques that were used abusively at Abu Ghraib in Iraq and elsewhere, it did not apply to interrogators working anywhere outside Guantanamo Bay. But, on March 14, 2003, five days before the United States began the invasion of Iraq, John Yoo of the DOJ Office of Legal Counsel issued a legal opinion/memo to Haynes, concluding that federal laws related to the use of torture of prisoners and suspects did not apply to interrogations overseas.

In August 2004, the Independent Panel to Review Department of Defense Detention Operations, which was convened in the wake of the Abu Ghraib scandal that broke in April 2004, issued a report claiming that the methods Haynes recommended were "strictly limited for use at Guantanamo" and that officers there "used those...techniques with only two detainees, gaining important and time sensitive information in the process."

The panel's report faulted Haynes for formulating his November 2002 interrogation memo to the Secretary of Defense without giving greater consideration to the input of Judge Advocates General and the general counsels of the armed services. The authors of the report suggest that had Haynes done so, the military might not have needed to revise its Guantanamo interrogation standards in April 2003, following objections from some within the military that the standards adopted in late-2002 might lead to abuse of detainees.

In March 2008, Haynes resigned from his position at the Pentagon. His nearly seven years in office made him the longest-serving general counsel in the history of the Department of Defense. Upon his departure, Secretary of Defense Robert Gates awarded Haynes the Department of Defense Medal for Distinguished Public Service, the highest award for a civilian appointee.

== Fourth Circuit nomination ==
In 2003, Haynes was nominated by George W. Bush to the United States Court of Appeals for the Fourth Circuit. During the more than three years that Haynes's nomination was pending, the American Bar Association evaluated him twice and both times rated him Well-Qualified, the highest rating given to judicial nominees. Haynes received the support of a number of prominent lawyers, including Cass Sunstein and former NAACP Legal Defense Fund chairman William Thaddeus Coleman Jr.

The Judiciary Committee approved Haynes's nomination in November 2003, but he did not receive a vote in the full Senate. Although re-nominated in subsequent Congresses, Haynes never moved past the committee level. Republican Senator Lindsey Graham of South Carolina was revealed to be the principal opponent to the appointment. In December 2006, after the Senate adjourned following the Democratic gains of the 2006 elections, Haynes asked President Bush to forego re-nominating him to the Court of Appeals. Scott Horton in a February 2008 blog in Harper's noted that Graham was a reserve judge in the Judge Advocate General's Corps (JAG) and had opposed Haynes' conflicts with JAG lawyers at Defense.

== Dick Durbin questions ==
Senator Dick Durbin asked questions of Brett Kavanaugh during his circuit court confirmation hearing in 2006 regarding the vetting of Haynes for a nomination to the federal bench, saying "At the time of the Haynes nomination, what did you know about Mr. Haynes' role in crafting the administration's detention and interrogation policies?" Kavanaugh responded, "Senator, I did not – I was not involved and am not involved in the questions about the rules governing detention of combatants or – and so I do not have the involvement with that." "And with respect to Mr. Haynes' nomination, I've – I know Jim Haynes, but it was not one of the nominations that I handled." But in 2007 Durbin read a Washington Post report regarding the resistance of Navy General Counsel Alberto J. Mora, to the so-called "Torture Memos" which seemed to imply that Kavanaugh had not given honest answers. He recently tweeted a copy of a letter to Kavanaugh, saying, "In 2007 I sent Brett Kavanaugh this letter asking to explain his inaccurate and misleading testimony to the Senate Judiciary Committee. I'm still waiting for an answer."

== Recent private sector work and academia ==
Later in March 2008, Haynes joined Chevron Corporation as its Chief Corporate Counsel.

In June 2012, Haynes took over as general counsel and executive vice president of SIGA Technologies, Inc., a pharmaceutical company headquartered in New York City. Additionally, he holds an appointment as a Distinguished Fellow at the George Mason University School of Law Center for Infrastructure Protection and Homeland Security.

== See also ==
- Director of Operations, Planning and Development for Military Commissions
- Equal Justice for United States Military Personnel Act of 2007

== Honors and awards ==
In 2005, Haynes received Davidson's Distinguished Alumnus Award. He also holds an honorary LLD from Stetson University College of Law. In 2003 and 2008, Haynes received the Navy Distinguished Public Service Award.

== Notes ==
Government offices
Preceded by Susan J. Crawford	General Counsel of the Army; 1990–1993	Succeeded by William Thaddeus Coleman III
Preceded by Douglas Dworkin	General Counsel of the Department of Defense; 2001–2008	Succeeded by Jeh Johnson
