= Leonard Niederlehner =

American lawyer (1914–1991)

Deputy General Counsel of Defense
- In office 1953 – December 10, 1991
- President: See list: Dwight D. Eisenhower John F. Kennedy Lyndon B. Johnson Richard Nixon Gerald Ford Jimmy Carter Ronald Reagan George H. W. Bush

General Counsel of Defense (Acting)
- In office August 7, 1987 – October 25, 1987
- President: Ronald Reagan
- Preceded by: Henry L. Garrett III
- Succeeded by: Kathleen A. Buck
- In office January 20, 1981 – April 1, 1981
- President: Ronald Reagan
- Preceded by: Togo D. West Jr.
- Succeeded by: William Howard Taft IV
- In office October 15, 1979 – February 1, 1980
- President: Jimmy Carter
- Preceded by: Deanne C. Siemer
- In office August 6, 1975 – January 1, 1976
- President: Gerald Ford
- Preceded by: Martin Richard Hoffman
- Succeeded by: Richard A. Wiley
- In office May 22, 1973 – March 13, 1974
- President: Richard Nixon
- Preceded by: J. Fred Buzhardt
- Succeeded by: Martin Richard Hoffmann
- In office August 1, 1967 – August 20, 1970
- President: Lyndon B. Johnson; Richard Nixon
- Preceded by: Paul Warnke
- Succeeded by: J. Fred Buzhardt
- In office July 1, 1964 – September 19, 1966
- President: Lyndon B. Johnson
- Preceded by: John McNaughton
- Succeeded by: Paul Warnke

Assistant General Counsel of Defense (Logistics)
- In office 1952–1953

Personal details
- Born: Leonard Niederlehner; October 12, 1914 Cincinnati, Ohio
- Died: December 10, 1991 (aged 77) Arlington County, Virginia
- Spouse: Helen Warfield
- Children: James R. Niederlehner; Barbara Niederlehner Willis; John L. Niederlehner
- Education: University of Cincinnati (BL)

Military service
- Branch/service: United States Navy Reserve
- Years of service: 1942-1946
- Rank: Lieutenant commander

Leonard Niederlehner (October 12, 1914 - December 10, 1991) was an American lawyer who served as Deputy General Counsel for the Department of Defense for nearly four decades, from 1953 until his death in 1991.

== Biography ==
Niederlehner was born on October 12, 1914, in Cincinnati, Ohio, to Louis William Niederlehner and Agnes Clark. He attended the University of Cincinnati and graduated with a Bachelor of Laws degree in 1937 and passed the Ohio bar that same year. In 1938 he moved to Washington, D.C., and worked as a secretary for Congressman Herbert S. Bigelow. He later served as a lawyer for the Federal Security Agency in 1941 and served during World War II in the United States Navy Reserve as a lieutenant commander. After the war he was counsel for the Navy's Bureau of Yards and Docks and later for the Army-Navy Munitions Board. In 1952 he became assistant general counsel for logistics in the Department of Defense, and he served in that capacity until 1953 when he was named deputy general counsel. He would serve on and off as acting general counsel a total of seven times.

He received the Rockefeller Public Service Award in 1961, four Department of Defense Distinguished Civilian Service medals, the National Civil Service League Award in 1965, the President's Medal for Distinguished Civilian Service in 1979, the President's Award for Meritorious Executive in 1980, the Department of Defense Distinguished Public Service Award in 1981 and the presidential rank of Meritorious Executive in 1985 and 1991.

He was former Arlington District Chairman of the Boy Scouts, and he had received the Silver Beaver Award for contributions to scouting. He was a member of Cherrydale United Methodist Church in Arlington and an enthusiastic sailor.

== Personal life ==
Niederlehner married Helen Warfield on July 2, 1948, and had three children, James, Barbara and John. They had four grandchildren. Helen died in 1983.
