= Cyrus Vance =

American lawyer and diplomat (1917–2002)

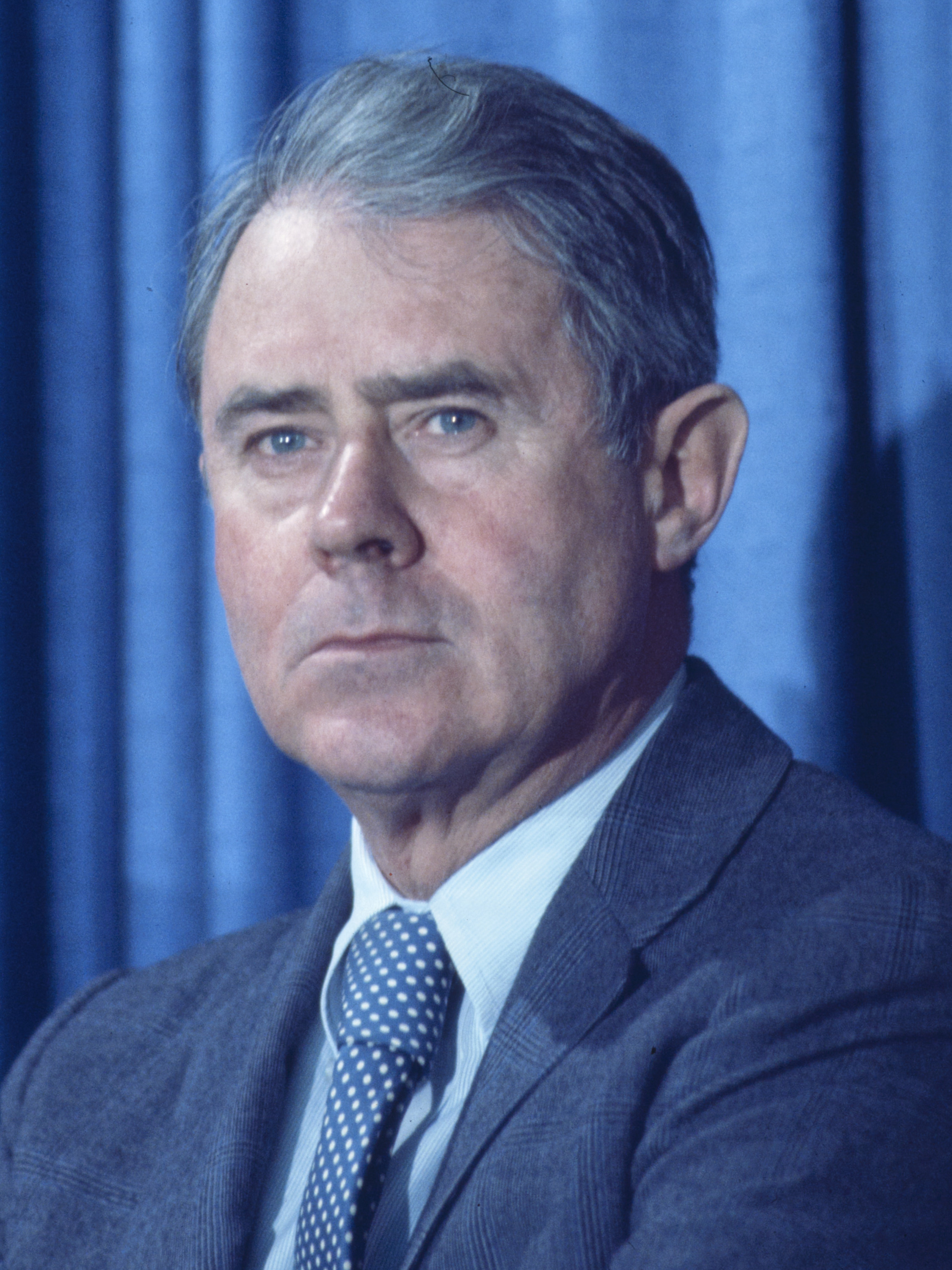
- Vance in 1977

57th United States Secretary of State
- In office January 20, 1977 – April 28, 1980
- President: Jimmy Carter
- Deputy: Warren Christopher
- Preceded by: Henry Kissinger
- Succeeded by: Edmund Muskie

11th United States Deputy Secretary of Defense
- In office January 28, 1964 – June 30, 1967
- President: Lyndon B. Johnson
- Preceded by: Roswell Gilpatric
- Succeeded by: Paul Nitze

7th United States Secretary of the Army
- In office July 5, 1962 – January 21, 1964
- President: John F. Kennedy; Lyndon B. Johnson
- Preceded by: Elvis Jacob Stahr Jr.
- Succeeded by: Stephen Ailes

General Counsel of the Department of Defense
- In office January 29, 1961 – June 30, 1962
- President: John F. Kennedy
- Preceded by: Vincent Burke
- Succeeded by: John McNaughton

Personal details
- Born: Cyrus Roberts Vance; March 27, 1917 Clarksburg, West Virginia, U.S.
- Died: January 12, 2002 (aged 84) New York City, U.S.
- Resting place: Arlington National Cemetery
- Party: Democratic
- Spouse: Gay Sloane (m. 1947)
- Children: 5, including Cyrus Jr.
- Relatives: John W. Davis (adoptive father)
- Education: Yale University (BA, LLB)

Military service
- Allegiance: United States
- Branch/service: United States Navy
- Years of service: 1942–1946
- Rank: Lieutenant
- Unit: USS Hale (DD-642)
- Battles/wars: World War II

Cyrus Roberts Vance (March 27, 1917 – January 12, 2002) was an American lawyer and diplomat who served as the 57th United States Secretary of State under President Jimmy Carter from 1977 to 1980. Prior to serving in that position, he was the United States Deputy Secretary of Defense in the Johnson administration. During the Kennedy administration he was Secretary of the Army and General Counsel of the Department of Defense.

As Secretary of State, Vance approached foreign policy with an emphasis on negotiation over conflict and a special interest in arms reduction. In April 1980, he resigned in protest of Operation Eagle Claw, the secret mission to rescue American hostages in Iran. He was succeeded by Edmund Muskie.

Vance was the cousin (and adoptive son) of 1924 Democratic presidential nominee and lawyer John W. Davis. He was the father of Manhattan District Attorney Cyrus Vance Jr.

== Early life and family ==
Cyrus Vance was born on March 27, 1917, in Clarksburg, West Virginia. He was the son of John Carl Vance II and his wife, Amy (Roberts) Vance, and had an elder brother, John Carl Vance III. Following Vance's birth, his family relocated to Bronxville, New York, so that his father could commute to New York City, where he was an insurance broker. Vance's father was also a landowner and worked for a government agency during World War I. He died unexpectedly of pneumonia in 1922.

Vance's mother was Amy Roberts Vance, who had a prominent family history in Philadelphia and was active in civic affairs. Following her husband's death, she moved her family to Switzerland for a year, where Vance and his brother learned French at L'Institut Sillig in Vevey. Vance's much older cousin (referred to as an "uncle" within the family) John W. Davis, an Ambassador to the United Kingdom and 1924 United States presidential candidate, became his mentor and adopted him.

Vance graduated from Kent School in 1935 and earned a bachelor's degree in 1939 from Yale College, where he was a member of the secret Scroll and Key society and earned three varsity letters in ice hockey. He graduated from Yale Law School in 1942. While there, his classmates included Sargent Shriver, William Scranton, Stanley Rogers Resor, and William Bundy, with all of whom he would later work.

During World War II, Vance served in the United States Navy as a gunnery officer on the destroyer USS Hale (DD-642) until 1946. He saw sea action in the Battle of Tarawa, the Battle of Saipan, the Battle of Guam (1944), the Bougainville Campaign, and the Philippines Campaign (1944–1945). After the war, he worked for the Mead Corporation for a year before joining the law firm Simpson Thacher & Bartlett in New York City.

At the age of 29, Vance married Grace Elsie "Gay" Sloane on February 15, 1947. She was a Bryn Mawr College graduate and was the daughter of the board chairman of the W. & J. Sloane furniture company in New York City. They had five children:

- Elsie Nicoll Vance
- Amy Sloane Vance
- Grace Roberts Vance
- Camilla Vance Holmes
- Cyrus R. Vance Jr.

== Political career ==
In 1957, Senator Lyndon B. Johnson asked Vance to leave Wall Street to work for the United States Senate Committee on Armed Services, where he helped draft the National Aeronautics and Space Act, leading to the creation of NASA.

In 1961, Defense Secretary Robert McNamara recruited Vance to become General Counsel of the Department of Defense. He was then made the Secretary of the Army by President John F. Kennedy. He was Secretary when Army units were sent to northern Mississippi in 1962 to protect James Meredith and ensure that the court-ordered integration of the University of Mississippi took place.

In 1964, Vance became the United States Deputy Secretary of Defense and now-President Johnson sent him to the Panama Canal Zone after student riots. After the 1967 Detroit riot, Johnson sent him to Michigan. Vance next attempted to delay the Cyprus dispute as the President's personal envoy, brokering the Greek-Turkish agreement of Dec. 1, 1967. In 1968, Johnson sent him to South Korea to deal with the USS Pueblo hostage situation.

Vance first supported the Vietnam War but by the late 1960s changed his views and resigned from office, advising the president to withdraw US troops from South Vietnam. In 1968, Vance served as a deputy to W. Averell Harriman during the peace negotiations in Paris with the North Vietnamese. However, the South Vietnamese government refused to participate, in the hopes that Richard Nixon would win the US presidential election and deliver a more favourable settlement. Vance called Saigon's decision "one of the great tragedies in history". He received the Presidential Medal of Freedom in January 1969.

In May 1970, Vance was appointed to serve as a commissioner in a landmark panel known as the Knapp Commission, which was formed and assigned by New York City Mayor John V. Lindsay to investigate systemic corruption in the New York Police Department. The Knapp Commission held televised hearings into police corruption and issued a final report of its findings in 1972. The work of the Knapp Commission led to the prosecution of police officers on charges of corruption and culminated in significant, if short-lived, reforms and oversight of the police department, including the appointment of a temporary special prosecutor to investigate and prosecute corruption committed by NYPD officers, district attorneys, and judges.

From 1974 to 1976, Vance served as president of the New York City Bar Association. Vance returned to his law practice at Simpson Thacher & Bartlett in 1980, but was repeatedly called back to public service throughout the 1980s and 1990s, participating in diplomatic missions to Bosnia, Croatia, and South Africa. Vance helped negotiate the dispute over the Nagorno-Karabakh region.

=== Secretary of State ===
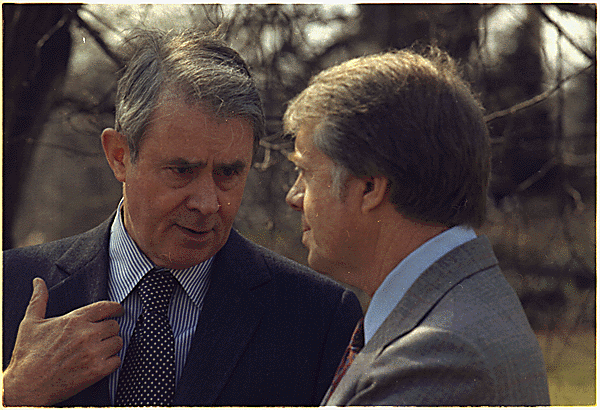
Vance talks with President Carter on the White House lawn, March 1977

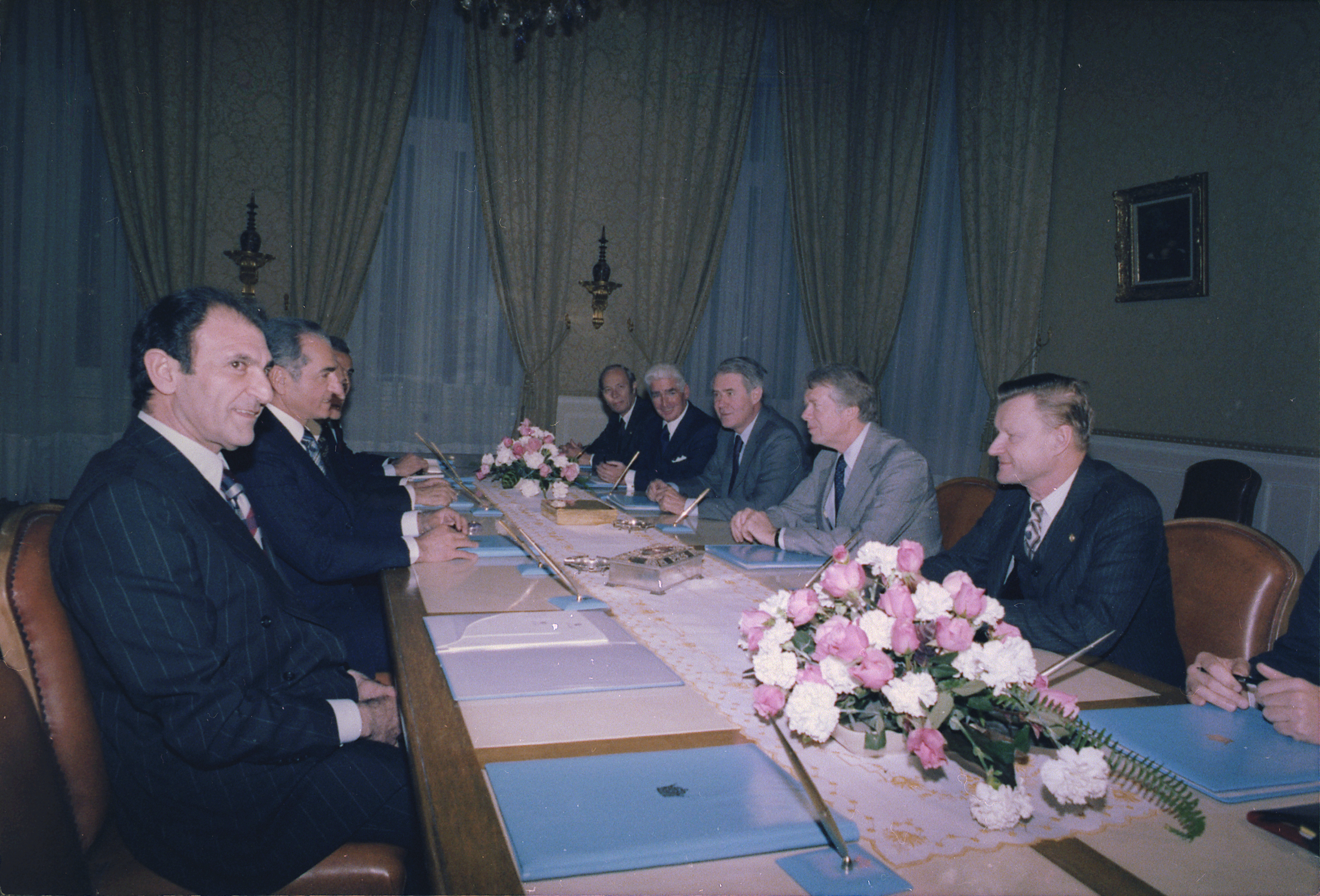
The Shah of Iran Mohammad Reza Pahlavi meeting with Alfred Leroy Atherton, William H. Sullivan, Vance, President Jimmy Carter, and Zbigniew Brzezinski in 1977

President Jimmy Carter initially wanted to nominate George Ball to become Secretary of State, but, fearing Ball was too liberal to be confirmed, nominated Vance instead. Vance played an integral role as the administration negotiated the Panama Canal Treaties, along with peace talks in Rhodesia, Namibia and South Africa. He worked closely with Israeli Ministers Moshe Dayan and Ezer Weizman to secure the Camp David Accords in 1978. Vance insisted that the President make Paul Warnke Director of the Arms Control and Disarmament Agency, over strong opposition by Senator Henry M. Jackson.

Vance also pushed for détente with the Soviet Union, and clashed frequently with the more hawkish National Security Advisor Zbigniew Brzezinski. Vance tried to advance arms limitations by working on the SALT II agreement with the Soviet Union, which he saw as the central diplomatic issue of the time, but Brzezinski lobbied for a tougher more assertive policy vis-a-vis the Soviets. He argued for strong condemnation of Soviet activity in Africa and in the Third World and successfully lobbied for normalized relations with the People's Republic of China in 1978.

As Brzezinski took control of the negotiations, Vance was marginalized and his influence began to wane. When revolution erupted in Iran in late 1978, the two were divided on how to support the United States' ally the Shah of Iran. Vance argued in favor of reforms while Brzezinski urged him to crack down – the 'iron fist' approach. Unable to receive a direct course of action from Carter, the mixed messages that the Shah received from Vance and Brzezinski contributed to his confusion and indecision as he fled Iran in January 1979 and his regime collapsed.

Vance negotiated the SALT II agreement directly with Soviet Ambassador Anatoly Dobrynin, bypassing American Ambassador Malcolm Toon, who then criticized the agreement. In June 1979, President Carter and Soviet General Secretary Leonid Brezhnev signed the treaty in Vienna's Hofburg Imperial Palace, in front of the international press, but the Senate ultimately did not ratify it. After the Soviet invasion of Afghanistan on December 27, 1979, Vance's opposition to what he had called "visceral anti-Sovietism" led to a rapid reduction of his stature.

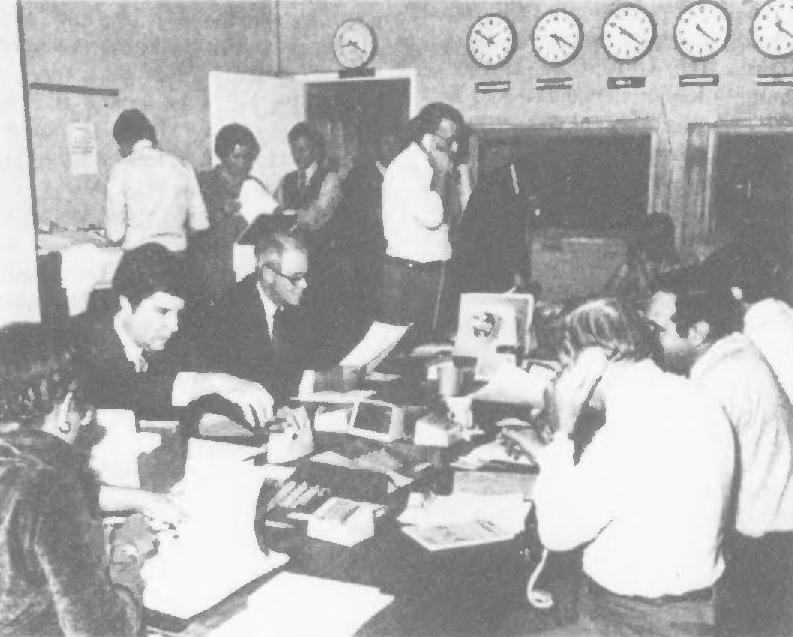
Vance working to free hostages in the State Department Operations Center, 1979

Vance's attempt to surreptitiously negotiate a solution to the Iran hostage crisis with Ayatollah Ruhollah Khomeini through the Palestine Liberation Organization failed badly. Believing that diplomatic initiatives could see the hostages safely returned home, Vance initially fought off attempts by Brzezinski to pursue a military solution. Vance, struggling with gout, went to Florida on April 10, 1980, for a long weekend. On April 11, the National Security Council held a newly scheduled meeting and authorized Operation Eagle Claw, a military expedition into Tehran to rescue the hostages. Deputy Secretary Warren Christopher, who attended the meeting in Vance's place, did not inform him. Furious, on April 21, Vance handed in his resignation, calling Brzezinski "evil". The only secretaries of State who had previously resigned in protest were Lewis Cass, who resigned in the buildup to the Civil War, and William Jennings Bryan, who resigned in the buildup to World War I.

President Carter aborted the operation after only five of the eight helicopters he had sent into the Dasht-e Kavir desert arrived in operational condition. As U.S. forces prepared to depart from the staging area, a helicopter collided with a transport plane, causing a fire that killed eight servicemen. Vance's resignation was confirmed several days later, and he was replaced by Senator Edmund Muskie. A second rescue mission was planned but never carried out, and the diplomatic efforts to negotiate the release of the hostages were handed over to Deputy Secretary Christopher. The hostages were released during the first inauguration of Ronald Reagan, after 444 days in captivity.

== Later career in law and as special envoy ==
In 1991, he was named Special Envoy of the Secretary-General of the United Nations for Croatia and proposed the Vance plan for solution of conflict in Croatia. Authorities of Croatia and Serbia agreed to Vance's plan, but the leaders of SAO Krajina rejected it, even though it offered Serbs quite a large degree of autonomy by the rest of the world's standards, as it did not include full independence for Krajina. He continued his work as member of Zagreb 4 group. The plan they drafted, named Z-4, was effectively superseded when Croatian forces retook the Krajina region (Operation Storm) in 1995.

In January 1993, as the United Nations Special Envoy to Bosnia, Vance and Lord David Owen, the EU representative, began negotiating a peace plan for the ending the War in Bosnia. The plan was rejected, and Vance announced his resignation as Special Envoy to the UN Secretary-General. He was replaced by Norwegian Foreign Minister Thorvald Stoltenberg.

In 1997, he was made the original honorary chair of the American Iranian Council.

== Later life ==
Vance was a member of both the American Academy of Arts and Sciences and the American Philosophical Society.

In 1993, Vance was awarded the United States Military Academy's Sylvanus Thayer Award.

In 1995 he again acted as Special Envoy of the Secretary-General of the United Nations and signed the interim accord as witness in the negotiations between the Republic of Macedonia and Greece. Vance was a member of the Trilateral Commission.

Vance also served on the board of directors of IBM, Pan American World Airways, Manufacturers Hanover Trust, U.S. Steel, and The New York Times, as a trustee of the Yale Corporation, as chairman of the board of the Rockefeller Foundation, and vice chairman of the Council on Foreign Relations.

== Death ==
Vance suffered for several years from Alzheimer's disease, and died at Mount Sinai Hospital in New York City, on January 12, 2002, aged 84, of pneumonia and other complications. His funeral was held at the Church of the Heavenly Rest in Manhattan. His remains are interred at the Arlington National Cemetery in Arlington County, Virginia. His wife Grace died in New York City on March 22, 2008, at the age of 89.

== Legacy ==
He received the Presidential Medal of Freedom in 1969.

In 1980, Vance received the U.S. Senator John Heinz Award for Greatest Public Service by an Elected or Appointed Official, an award given out annually by Jefferson Awards.

He received the Freedom Medal in 1993.

The house of Vance's mother, which was known as the Stealey-Goff-Vance House, was listed on the National Register of Historic Places in 1979. It is home to the Harrison County Historical Society.

In 1999, Vance was presented the Lifetime Contributions to American Diplomacy Award by the American Foreign Service Association.

In the 2012 movie Argo, he was portrayed by actor Bob Gunton.

Legal offices
Preceded by J. Vincent Byrne Jr.	General Counsel of the Department of Defense; January 29, 1961 – June 30, 1962	Succeeded by John McNaughton
Political offices
Preceded by Elvis Jacob Stahr Jr.	U.S. Secretary of the Army; Served under: John F. Kennedy, Lyndon B. Johnson; July 1962 – January 1964	Succeeded by Stephen Ailes
Preceded by Roswell Gilpatric	United States Deputy Secretary of Defense; 1964–1967	Succeeded by Paul Nitze
Preceded by Henry Kissinger	U.S. Secretary of State; Served under: Jimmy Carter; 1977–1980	Succeeded by Edmund Muskie
Non-profit organization positions
Preceded by C. Douglas Dillon	Chairman of the Rockefeller Foundation; 1975 — 1977	Succeeded by Theodore Hesburgh
