= General Counsel of the Department of Defense =

Chief legal officer of the United States Department of Defense

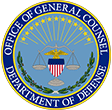
- Seal of the Office of General Counsel

- Flag of the general counsel

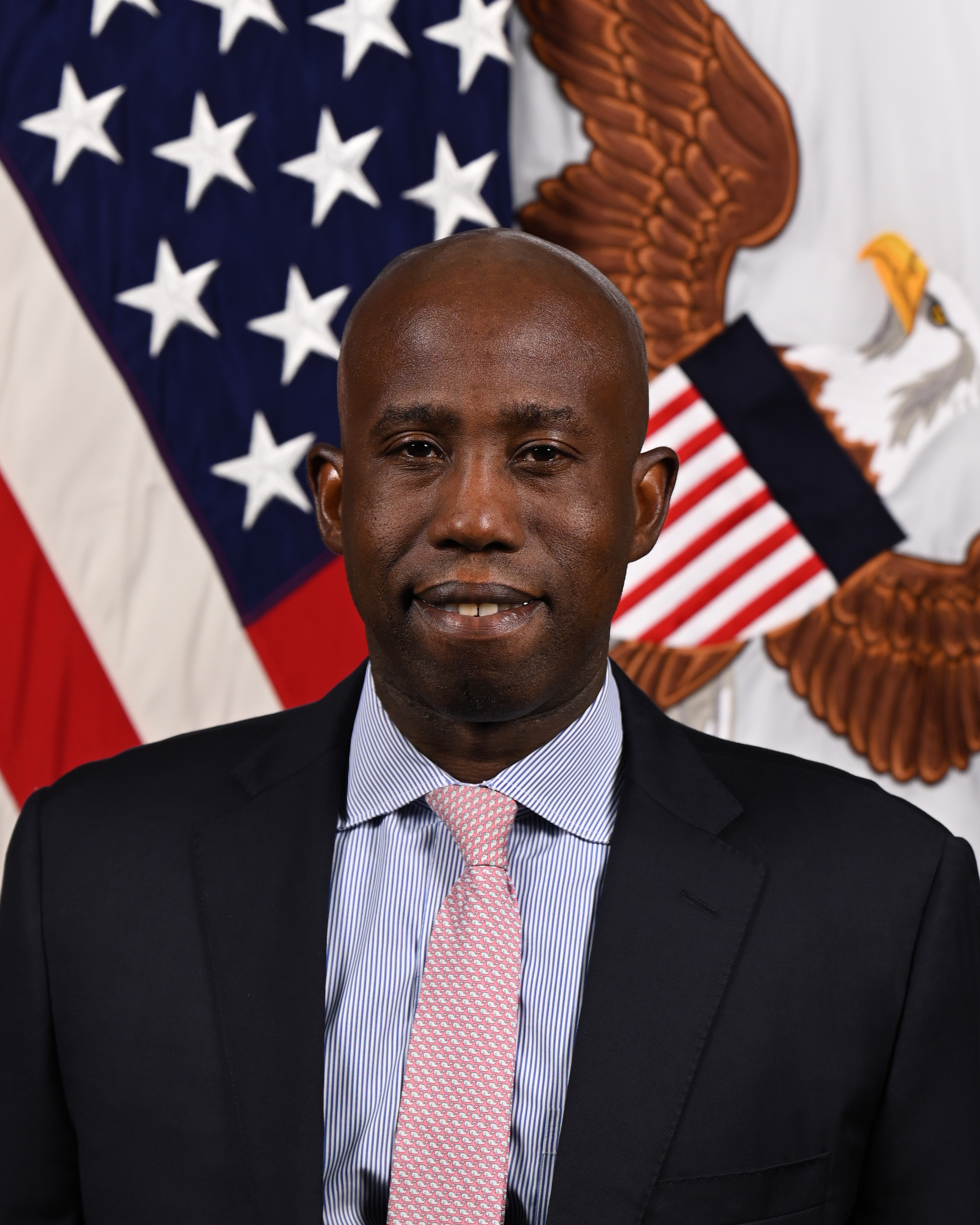
- Incumbent; Earl G. Matthews since July 31, 2025
- Department of Defense; Office of the Secretary
- Style: The Honorable
- Reports to: Secretary of Defense; Deputy Secretary of Defense
- Seat: The Pentagon, Arlington County, Virginia, United States
- Appointer: The president with Senate advice and consent
- Term length: No fixed term
- Constituting instrument: 10 U.S.C. § 140
- Precursor: Assistant Secretary of Defense for Legal and Legislative Affairs
- Formation: 1953
- First holder: H. Struve Hensel
- Deputy: Principal Deputy General Counsel
- Salary: Executive Schedule, level IV
- Website: ogc.osd.mil

The general counsel of the Department of Defense is the chief legal officer of the Department of Defense (DoD), advising both the secretary and deputy secretary on all legal matters and services, and providing legal advice to Office of the Secretary of Defense organizations and, as appropriate, other DOD components.

The general counsel develops the department's legislative program and coordinates DoD positions on legislation and executive orders; coordinates the appeals process for denied FOIA requests; oversees the performance and standards of DoD attorneys; establishes policy on general legal issues and determines the DoD position on specific legal problems; maintains repository for all international agreements coordinated, negotiated, or concluded by DoD personnel; and is "dual-hatted" as director of the Defense Legal Services Agency.

This position was established by Reorganization Plan No. 6 of 1953 and by Defense Directive 5145.1, signed 24 August 1953. The position derived its responsibilities from one of the original three special assistants to the secretary (established in 1947) and the assistant secretary of defense (legal and legislative affairs) (established in 1949).

The Standards of Conduct Office (SOCO) is an element of the Defense Legal Services Agency within the Office of General Counsel.

== Office holders ==
General counsels of the Department of Defense
Image	Name	Tenure	SecDef(s) served under	President(s) served under
	H. Struve Hensel	August 17, 1953 – March 4, 1954	Charles Erwin Wilson	Dwight Eisenhower
	Wilber M. Brucker	April 23, 1954 – July 20, 1955	Charles Erwin Wilson	Dwight Eisenhower
	Mansfield D. Sprague	October 6, 1955 – February 27, 1957	Charles Erwin Wilson	Dwight Eisenhower
	Robert Dechert	February 28, 1957 – July 15, 1959	Charles Erwin Wilson; Neil H. McElroy	Dwight Eisenhower
	J. Vincent Burke Jr.	September 14, 1959 – January 20, 1961	Neil H. McElroy; Thomas S. Gates	Dwight Eisenhower
	Cyrus Vance	January 29, 1961 – June 30, 1962	Robert S. McNamara	John F. Kennedy
	John McNaughton	July 5, 1962 – June 25, 1964	Robert S. McNamara	John F. Kennedy; Lyndon B. Johnson
	Leonard Niederlehner (Acting)	July 1, 1964 – September 19, 1966	Robert S. McNamara	Lyndon B. Johnson
	Paul Warnke	October 3, 1966 – July 31, 1967	Robert S. McNamara	Lyndon B. Johnson
	Leonard Niederlehner (Acting)	August 1, 1967 – August 20, 1970	Robert S. McNamara; Clark Clifford; Melvin Laird	Lyndon B. Johnson; Richard Nixon
	J. Fred Buzhardt	August 20, 1970 – January 4, 1974	Melvin Laird; Elliot Richardson; James R. Schlesinger	Richard Nixon
	Leonard Niederlehner (Acting)	May 22, 1973 – March 13, 1974	James R. Schlesinger	Richard Nixon
	Martin Richard Hoffmann	March 14, 1974 – August 5, 1975	James R. Schlesinger	Richard Nixon; Gerald Ford
	Leonard Niederlehner (Acting)	August 6, 1975 – January 1, 1976	James R. Schlesinger; Donald Rumsfeld	Gerald Ford
	Richard A. Wiley	January 2, 1976 – January 15, 1977	Donald Rumsfeld	Gerald Ford
	Deanne C. Siemer	April 28, 1977 – October 15, 1979	Harold Brown	Jimmy Carter
	Leonard Niederlehner (Acting)	October 15, 1979 – February 1, 1980	Harold Brown	Jimmy Carter
	Togo D. West Jr.	February 1, 1980 – January 20, 1981	Harold Brown	Jimmy Carter
	Leonard Niederlehner (Acting)	January 20, 1981 – April 1, 1981	Caspar Weinberger	Ronald Reagan
	William Howard Taft IV	April 2, 1981 – May 2, 1984	Caspar Weinberger	Ronald Reagan
	Chapman B. Cox	May 3, 1984 – December 16, 1985	Caspar Weinberger	Ronald Reagan
	Henry L. Garrett III	February 5, 1986 – August 6, 1987	Caspar Weinberger	Ronald Reagan
	Leonard Niederlehner (Acting)	August 7, 1987 – October 25, 1987	Caspar Weinberger	Ronald Reagan
	Kathleen A. Buck	October 26, 1987 – December 30, 1989	Caspar Weinberger; Frank Carlucci; William Howard Taft IV; Dick Cheney	Ronald Reagan; George H. W. Bush
	Terrence O'Donnell	October 30, 1989 – March 6, 1992	Dick Cheney	George H. W. Bush
	C. Paul Beach Jr. (Acting)	March 7, 1992 – August 11, 1992	Dick Cheney	George H. W. Bush
	David Addington	August 12, 1992 – January 20, 1993	Dick Cheney	George H. W. Bush
	John H. McNeil (Acting)	January 20, 1993 – May 5, 1993	Les Aspin	Bill Clinton
	Jamie Gorelick	May 5, 1993 – March 17, 1994	Lee Aspin; William Perry	Bill Clinton
	Stephen W. Preston (Acting)	March 28, 1994 – September 28, 1994	William Perry	Bill Clinton
	Judith A. Miller	September 29, 1994 – November 7, 1999	William Perry; William Cohen	Bill Clinton
	Douglas A. Dworkin	November 7, 1999 – June 14, 2000 (Acting); June 14, 2000 – January 19, 2001	William Cohen	Bill Clinton
	William J. Haynes II	May 24, 2001 – February 26, 2008	Donald Rumsfeld; Robert Gates	George W. Bush
	Jeh Johnson	February 10, 2009 – December 31, 2012	Robert Gates; Leon Panetta	Barack Obama
	Robert S. Taylor (Acting)	January 1, 2013 – October 25, 2013	Leon Panetta; Chuck Hagel	Barack Obama
	Stephen W. Preston	October 25, 2013 – June 1, 2015	Chuck Hagel; Ashton Carter	Barack Obama
	Robert S. Taylor (Acting)	June 1, 2015 – June 14, 2016	Ashton Carter	Barack Obama
	Jennifer M. O'Connor	June 14, 2016 – January, 20 2017	Ashton Carter	Barack Obama
	William S. Castle (Acting)	August 2017 – August 20, 2018	James Mattis	Donald Trump
	Paul C. Ney Jr.	August 20, 2018 – January 20, 2021	James Mattis; Mark Esper; Christopher C. Miller (acting)	Donald Trump
	Beth George (Acting)	January 20, 2021 – August 2, 2021	David Norquist (acting); Lloyd Austin	Joe Biden
	Caroline Krass	August 2, 2021 – January 20, 2025	Lloyd Austin	Joe Biden
	Charles L. Young III (acting)	January 20, 2025 – July 31, 2025	Pete Hegseth	Donald Trump
	Earl G. Matthews	July 31, 2025 – Present	Pete Hegseth	Donald Trump

== See also ==
- General Counsel of the Department of the Air Force
- General Counsel of the Army
- General Counsel of the Navy
