= Ralph Earle (ambassador) =

American diplomat (1928–2020)

Director of the Arms Control and Disarmament Agency
- In office January 3, 1980 – January 15, 1981
- President: Jimmy Carter
- Preceded by: George M. Seignious
- Succeeded by: Eugene V. Rostow

Personal details
- Born: September 26, 1928 Bryn Mawr, Pennsylvania, U.S.
- Died: January 13, 2020 (aged 91) Sarasota, Florida, U.S.
- Resting place: Arlington National Cemetery
- Relatives: George Earle (father)
- Education: Harvard University (BA, LLB)

Ralph Earle II (September 26, 1928 - January 13, 2020) was an American diplomat and arms control negotiator. He was a key architect of several major international arms control accords. He served as the United States' chief negotiator at the SALT II round of talks on nuclear disarmament from 1978 to 1979, as director of the Arms Control and Disarmament Agency (ACDA) between 1980 and 1981 and as deputy director at the ACDA from 1994 to 1999.

== Early life and education ==
Earle was born in Bryn Mawr, Pennsylvania, on September 26, 1928. He was the son of the former Governor of Pennsylvania, George H. Earle III and Huberta Potter Earle Sheaffer. He attended Episcopal Academy in Newtown Square, Pennsylvania and graduated from Deerfield Academy in Deerfield, Massachusetts in 1946. He graduated with a Bachelors degree in history from Harvard College in 1950 and Harvard Law School and served in the United States Army during the Korean War. Earle is a member of the influential Van Leer family. His paternal second great-grandfather was American Revolutionary War captain Samuel Van Leer.

== Career ==
Following law school and a clerkship with Federal Judge Bailey Aldrich, he worked for the law firm of Morgan, Lewis & Bockius and became a partner.

In 1968, he was appointed to be Principal Deputy Assistant Secretary of Defense for International Security Affairs and was a protege of Paul Nitze. Earle served as the Defense Advisor to the US Mission to NATO from 1969 to 1972. He joined the U.S.-Soviet SALT II negotiations as an alternate to chief negotiator Paul Warnke. Soviet diplomat Vladimir Semyonov was initially frustrated to meet often with the second in command negotiator, but their relationship strengthened through a mutual appreciation of classical music and shared experiences of both having teenage daughters.

In 1978, after the resignation of Warnke, Earle was appointed by President Jimmy Carter as the United States' chief negotiator at the Strategic Arms Limitation Talks (SALT II) with the Soviets and given the rank of Ambassador. He served as Director of the Arms Control and Disarmament Agency (ACDA) from 1980 to 1981. Earle received the Distinguished Honor Award from the ACDA for his role in the SALT II negotiations. He re-joined ACDA from 1994 to 1999 as its deputy director.

He was an active member of the Lawyers' Alliance for World Security (LAWS) and served on the Arms Control Association Board of Directors from 1987 to 1994.

He was a member of the American Law Institute, the Council on Foreign Relations, and the International Institute for Strategic Studies. In 2009, Ambassador Earle was awarded Deerfield Academy's Heritage Award—which recognizes "an alumnus/a whose professional and personal achievements represent a special contribution to the betterment of society."

== Personal life ==
Earle was married first to Eleanor Forbes Owens Earle and then to Julie von Sternberg Earle. He had five children: Eleanor Earle Mascheroni, Ralph Earle III, Duncan Owens Earle, Amanda Earle Ciccarelli, and Caroline Earle Walsh.

He died on January 13, 2020, from complications due to Parkinson's disease and was interred at Arlington National Cemetery on August 25, 2021.

== Bibliography ==
- Chief, U.S. SALT Delegation Ralph Earle II, SALT II Senate Testimony, pages 27-32, United States Department of State, Washington, D.C., July 9-11, 1979.
- Don't Abandon SALT II, Bulletin of the Atomic Scientists, pages 8-9, Aug-Sep 1986, Vol. 43, No. 1.

Diplomatic posts
Preceded by George M. Seignious	Director of the Arms Control and Disarmament Agency; 1980–1981	Succeeded by Eugene V. Rostow
