= Paul Warnke =

American lawyer and diplomat (1920-2001)

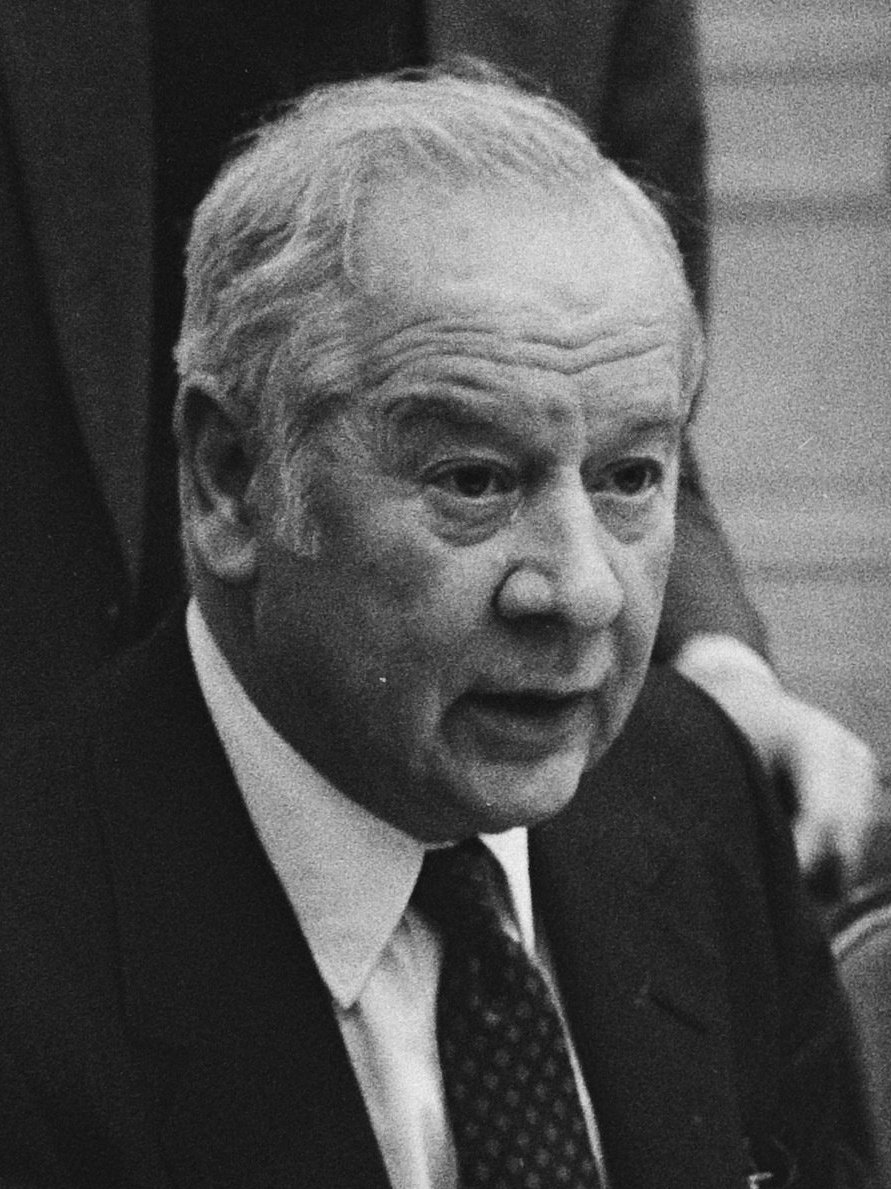

Director of the Arms Control and Disarmament Agency
- In office March 14, 1977 – October 31, 1978
- President: Jimmy Carter
- Preceded by: Fred Iklé
- Succeeded by: George M. Seignious

Assistant Secretary of Defense for International Security Affairs
- In office August 1, 1967 – February 15, 1969
- President: Lyndon B. Johnson; Richard Nixon
- Preceded by: John T. McNaughton
- Succeeded by: G. Warren Nutter

General Counsel of the Department of Defense
- In office October 3, 1966 – July 31, 1967
- President: Lyndon B. Johnson
- Preceded by: Leonard Niederlehner (acting)
- Succeeded by: Leonard Niederlehner (acting)

Personal details
- Born: Paul Culliton Warnke; January 31, 1920 Webster, Massachusetts, U.S.
- Died: October 31, 2001 (aged 81) Washington, D.C., U.S.
- Education: Yale University (BA); Columbia University (LLB)

Paul Culliton Warnke (January 31, 1920 – October 31, 2001) was an American diplomat.

== Early life and education ==
Warnke was born in Webster, Massachusetts, but spent most of his childhood in Marlborough, Massachusetts, where his father managed a shoe factory. He attended Yale University then served in the U. S. Coast Guard for five years during World War II. While in the Coast Guard, he was on a subchaser, tanker and a landing ship tank (LST), and served in the Atlantic Ocean and Pacific Theater. He rose to the rank of lieutenant. After completing his military service, he entered Columbia Law School, graduating in 1948.

== Career ==
In 1948, he joined the law firm Covington & Burling, run by Dean Acheson. He became a partner in 1956.

He hoped for a good job in the John F. Kennedy administration, but did not receive any appealing offers. However, he was offered the position of General Counsel to the Secretary of Defense in 1967 during the Lyndon Johnson Administration. He took that position and served under Robert McNamara, moving on to become Assistant Secretary of Defense for International Security Affairs from 1967 to 1969 under McNamara and then Clark Clifford.

During his time in the Defense Department, Warnke played a critical role in opposing expansion of the Vietnam War. In 1967, when Johnson asked Nicholas Katzenbach to gather a group of advisors to find “a way to peace in Vietnam,” Katzenbach invited Warnke to participate in weekly, off-the-record discussions with Cyrus Vance, Paul Nitze, Richard Helms, Averell Harriman and others. In that group, Warnke argued that the war was unwinnable. The discussions convinced Katzenbach to advise the president that negotiations were the only way short of unilateral withdrawal to get the United States out of Vietnam. After the Tet Offensive in early 1968, Warnke led an effort by civilian leaders in the Pentagon to express their views to the new Secretary of Defense, Clark Clifford, "about the difficult military situation and the need to consider peace negotiations".

While serving as the General Legal Counsel of the Secretary of Defense, he expressed doubt as to Israel’s explanation of the 1967 USS Liberty incident: “I found it hard to believe that it was, in fact, an honest mistake on the part of the Israeli air force units. I still find it impossible to believe that it was. I suspect that in the heat of battle they figured that the presence of this American ship was inimical to their interests, and that somebody without authorization attacked it.”

In 1968, Warnke led US government negotiations with Yitzhak Rabin about the Israeli purchase of US aircraft. Warnke worried greatly about the United States becoming the "principal provider" of arms to Israel. He was also greatly worried that Israel was close to the development of nuclear weapons. The two men disagreed on the definition of the word "introduce."

Under President Jimmy Carter he was chief SALT negotiator and Director of the Arms Control and Disarmament Agency. He helped negotiate the unratified SALT II agreement with the Soviet Union and was a tireless advocate of slowing the arms race. Warnke saw arms control as a step-by-step process, like "trying to get down from the top of a tall tree. If you go down a branch at a time, you're gonna end up on solid ground. If you try and do it in a single step, you're gonna make one hell of a mess."

Unlike many of his critics, most famously Paul Nitze, Warnke didn't believe in the late 1970s that the Soviets had a desire to attack the United States or that they would succeed if they did. Warnke believed that the United States, with a "triad" of strong defenses-in the air, on land, in the sea-had a strong enough military to deter any Soviet assault.

After leaving the Carter administration, he returned to private law practice and his work with Clark Clifford, forming Clifford & Warnke. He also stayed active in political issues as a member of the Committee for National Security, and he was elected to the Common Cause National Governing Board in 1983. After the elderly Clifford became entangled in the BCCI scandal and was unable to practice, Warnke and many of the other lawyers in the firm moved to Howrey & Simon.

Warnke died in Washington, D.C.

=== Apes on a Treadmill essay ===
After serving briefly under Richard Nixon in the same position, he joined the law firm of his former boss, which became known as Clifford, Warnke, Glass, McIlwaine & Finney. During this period he served as an adviser to presidential candidate George McGovern and also wrote a noteworthy article in Foreign Policy magazine, "Apes on a Treadmill". That piece criticized the current buildup of nuclear weapons by both sides and suggested that the United States unilaterally stop developing the B-1 bomber and the Trident submarine for six months. His hope was that the Soviets would respond with "reciprocal restraint".

Political offices
Preceded by Leonard Niederlehner; Acting	General Counsel of the Department of Defense; 1966–1967	Succeeded by Leonard Niederlehner; Acting
Preceded by John T. McNaughton	Assistant Secretary of Defense for International Security Affairs; 1967–1969	Succeeded by G. Warren Nutter
Diplomatic posts
Preceded by Fred Iklé	Director of the Arms Control and Disarmament Agency; 1977–1978	Succeeded by George M. Seignious
