= J. Fred Buzhardt =

American lawyer (1924–1978)

J. Fred Buzhardt Jr.
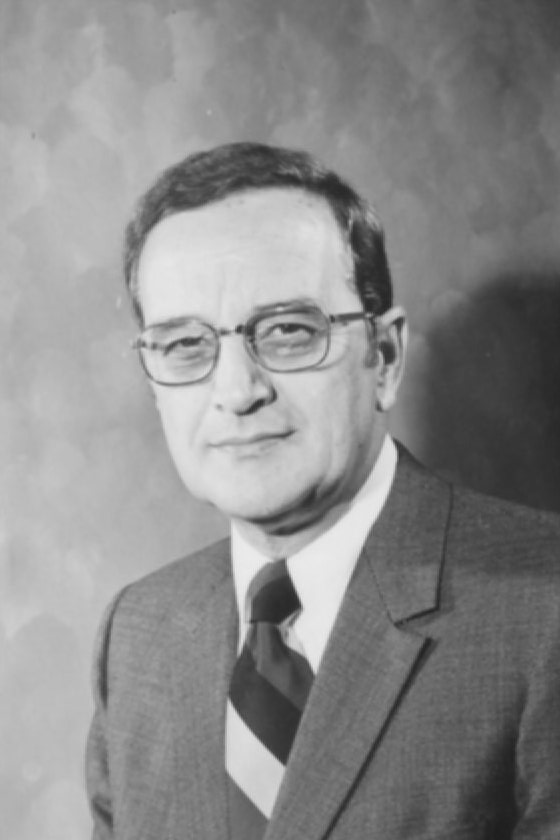
- Closeup portrait study of Fred Buzhardt.

General Counsel of the Department of Defense
- In office 1970–1973
- President: Richard Nixon
- Preceded by: Leonard Niederlehner
- Succeeded by: Martin R. Hoffmann

Personal details
- Born: Joseph Fred Buzhardt Jr; February 21, 1924 Greenwood, South Carolina
- Died: December 16, 1978 (aged 54) Hilton Head, South Carolina
- Spouse: Imogene Sanders
- Education: West Point Military Academy (B.S.); University of South Carolina (LL.B)

Joseph Fred Buzhardt Jr (February 21, 1924 – December 16, 1978) was an American attorney and public servant. He is best known for serving as special White House Counsel to Richard Nixon during the Watergate scandal. Previously he had served as General Counsel of the Department of Defense and as a legislative aide to Senator Strom Thurmond.

== Early life ==
Buzhardt was born in Greenwood, South Carolina, to Joseph Fred Buzhardt Sr., and Edna Hardin Buzhardt. The family later moved to McCormick, South Carolina, and Buzhardt graduated from McCormick High School with honors.

== Early career ==
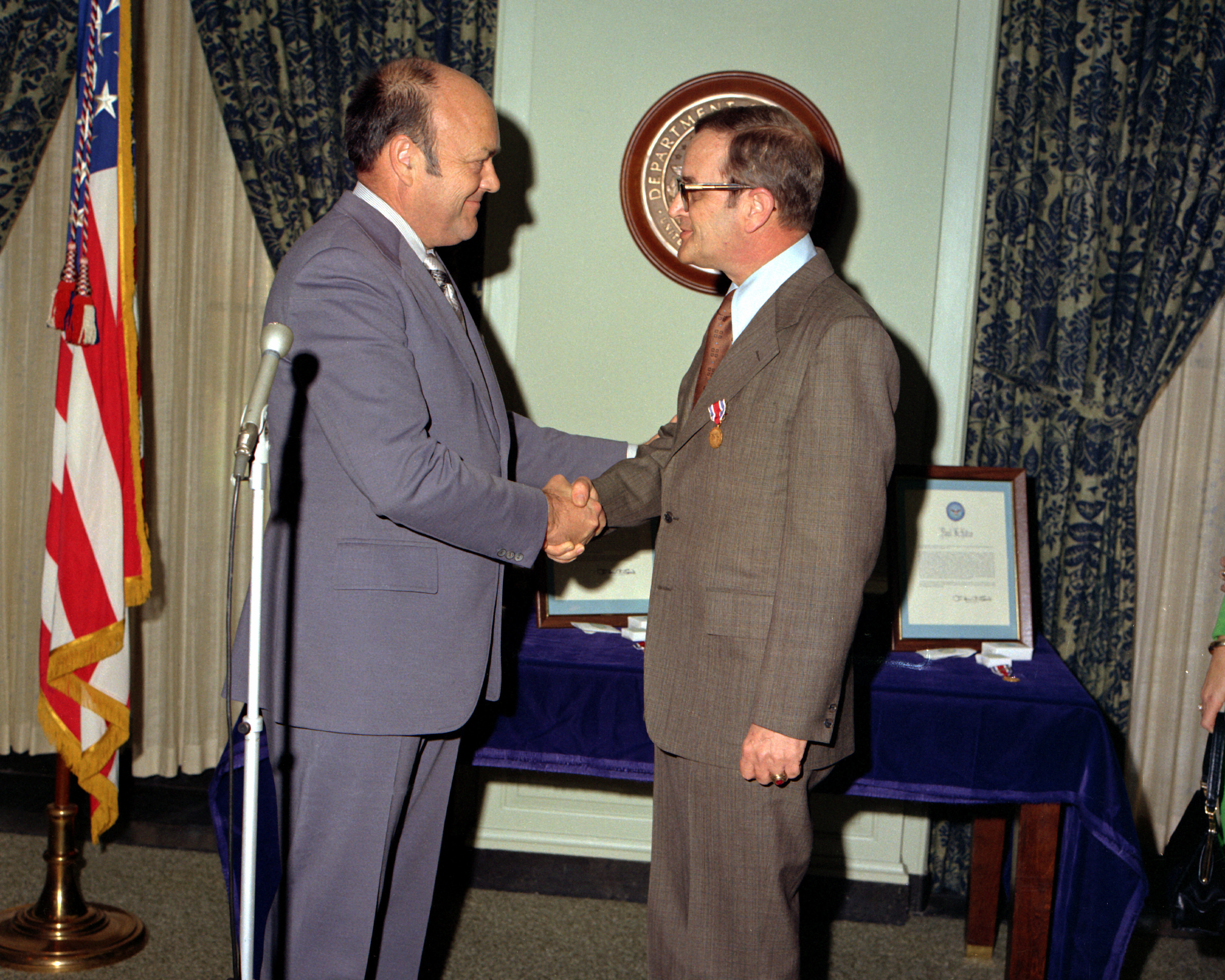
Buzhardt (right), receives the Department of Defense Distinguished Public Service Medal from Secretary of Defense Melvin Laird in 1973.

He first attended Wofford College from 1941 to 1943 before he was appointed to the US Military Academy. He graduated from West Point in 1946 and then served in the US Air Force. Following his military service, he attended the University of South Carolina and earned a law degree in 1952. He then returned to McCormick and entered private practice, alongside his father.

Buzhardt left private practice in 1958 to become a legislative assistant to Senator Strom Thurmond. During the 1964 presidential campaign, Buzhardt, along with William J. Baroody Jr. and Anthony J. Jurich, advised the Republican National Committee on military affairs. Buzhardt succeeded Harry S. Dent Sr., as Thurmond's administrative assistant in 1965. Buzhardt left Thurmond's staff in 1966, but the two remained close.

In 1968 Dent and Buzhardt attempted to talk Thurmond out of his proposed marriage to Nancy Moore, a former beauty queen and 44 years his junior. Their efforts were unsuccessful and apparently did not affect either man's relationship with Thurmond. Buzhardt was one of only 35 people, 26 of whom were family, in attendance at Thurmond's wedding to Moore in December 1968. According to Dent, Buzhardt was "like a son" to Thurmond, who had practiced law with Buzhardt's father.

Buzhardt stayed active in Republican party politics in South Carolina, serving as Marshall Parker's campaign manager for the latter's unsuccessful bid for US senator in 1968. That year, Buzhardt was named as an alternate delegate to the Republican National Convention, which would nominate Richard Nixon for the presidency. After the Republican victory in November, incoming Secretary of Defense Melvin Laird tapped Buzhardt for his staff.

== Watergate ==
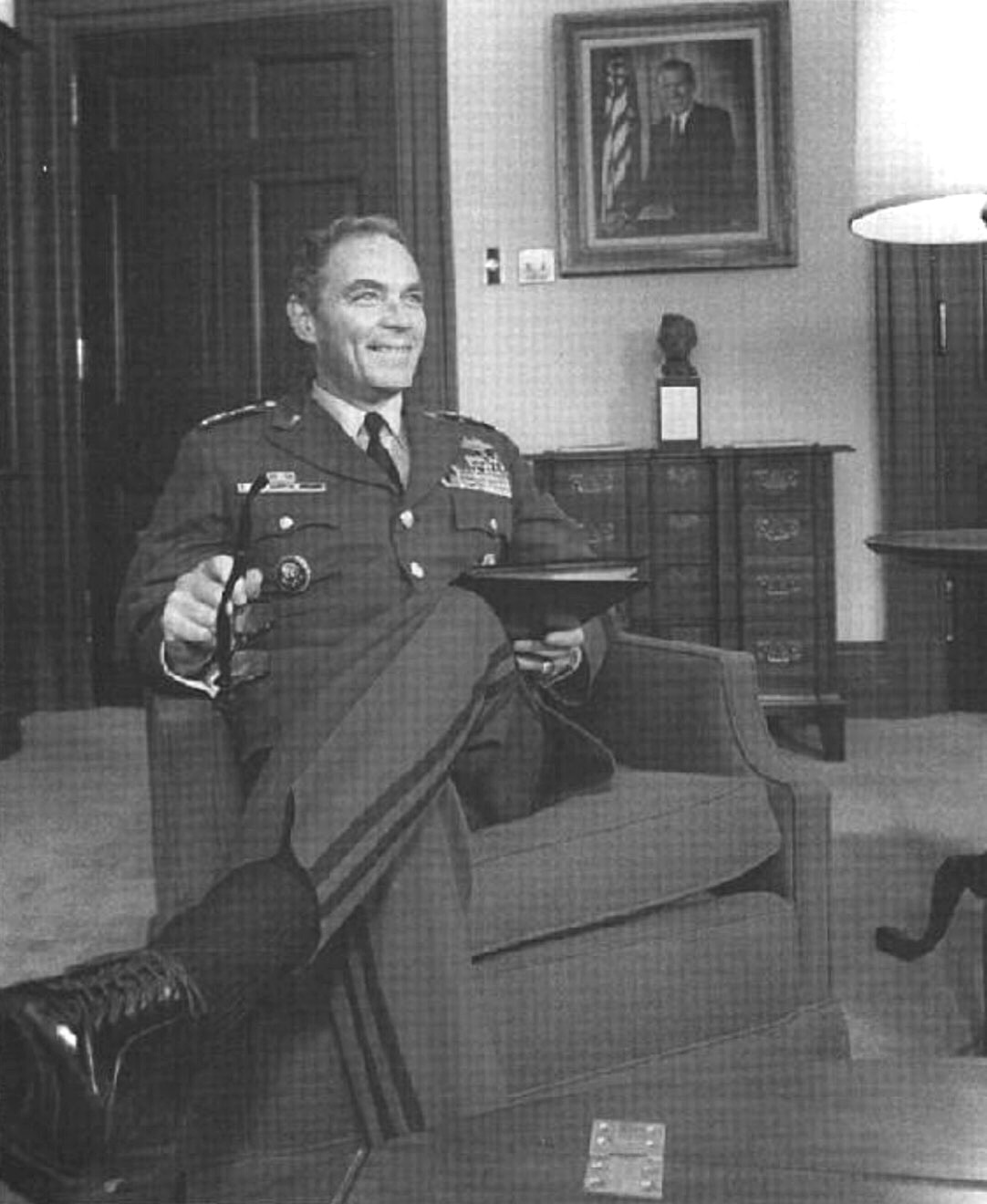
White House Chief of Staff General Alexander Haig sought Buzhardt's help with John Dean's allegations.

Buzhardt was named as special White House counsel for Watergate matters on May 10, 1973. Alexander Haig, President Nixon's new White House Chief of Staff following the resignation of H. R. Haldeman, told Buzhardt that his role at the White House would be temporary, and so he retained his title at the Defense Department. His first task as special counsel was to investigate former White House Counsel John Dean. Dean, whom the president had fired the previous week, was cooperating with investigators and was believed to possess classified documents. Buzhardt, through his contacts in the intelligence community, determined that the documents were related to the Huston Plan, an illegal proposed expansion of domestic surveillance.

It was Buzhardt who inadvertently tipped off Senate Watergate Committee investigators about the existence of the White House tapes. Nixon and Haig, who were aware of the sound-activated taping system in the Oval Office, had given to Buzhardt, who was not aware of it, detailed accounts of Nixon's meetings with Dean, including verbatim quotes. Buzhardt, in turn, conveyed the material to Fred Thompson, then minority counsel to the Watergate Committee. As recounted by Scott Armstrong, the majority staff discovered the transcript and questioned former White House aide Alexander Butterfield about its provenance. The questions led directly to Butterfield's July 16, 1973 disclosure of the taping system to the committee and then the public. Thompson, informed of the disclosure, in turn, warned Buzhardt, who then learned of it, for the first time, in that indirect way. Buzhardt would spend hundreds of hours listening to the tapes to determine their contents before the tapes were conveyed to investigators.

After Butterfield's revelation of the taping system, Buzhardt was active in resisting efforts by the Watergate special prosecutor to obtain them. That November, after Nixon agreed to surrender some tapes, it became Buzhardt's task to inform U.S. District Judge John Sirica, who had issued the subpoenas for the tapes, that one of them contained an 18 1/2 minute erased gap. The tape in question contained a conversation between the president and H. R. Haldeman from June 20, 1972, just a few days after the Watergate break-in.

Additionally, Buzhardt was involved in the negotiations that led to Vice President Spiro Agnew's resignation after being accused of accepting illegal payments. Judah Best, Agnew's attorney, recalled later that Buzhardt threatened to "personally... strap on his old '.45' and 'take care' of the situation" if anyone leaked the negotiations to the press. The negotiations did not leak, and Agnew resigned on October 10, 1973.

According to Bob Woodward in a 2026 memoir, Buzhardt confessed to him that Nixon was a "incorrigible liar whom [he] personally disliked."

== Later life ==
In a widely reported interview published in 1975, Buzhardt inquired whether the public would prefer "a competent scoundrel or an honest boob" as president, and he lamented that invasive media coverage inhibited good governance. Although Buzhardt denied it, Washington Post columnist David S. Broder interpreted the remark as a thinly veiled attack on Gerald Ford, Nixon's successor.

Buzhardt died of a heart attack at Hilton Head, South Carolina.

== Legacy ==
Buzhardt co-operated with Bob Woodward and Carl Bernstein during the research for a book, which became The Final Days, by sitting for eight "extensive" interviews. In the 1989 film adaptation of the book, Richard Kiley portrayed Buzhardt. Kiley called Buzhardt "one of the mystery men, very much behind the scenes, and yet he played a key role."

Leonard Garment, his former colleague in the Nixon White House, recalled Buzhardt as "one of the most profoundly moral men I have known."

Buzhardt's papers are at Clemson University.

== Sources ==
- Armstrong, Scott (March 1989). "Friday the Thirteenth". Journal of American History. 75 (4): 1234–1244. doi:10.2307/1908638. JSTOR 1908638.
- Bass, Jack; Thompson, Marilyn W. (1998). Ol' Strom: An Unauthorized Biography of Strom Thurmond. Longstreet Press. ISBN 1-56352-523-2. OCLC 40389243.
- Best, Judah (Spring 1977). "The Trial Lawyer's Role in the Sensational Case". Litigation. 3 (3): 22–25.
- Garment, Leonard (2000). In Search of Deep Throat: The Greatest Political Mystery of Our Time. Basic Books. ISBN 978-0-465-02613-5. OCLC 44718013.
- Woodward, Bob; Bernstein, Carl (1976). The Final Days. New York: Simon & Schuster. ISBN 0-671-22298-8. OCLC 1975233.
