= Lynn E. Davis =

American diplomat (born 1943)

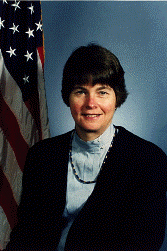

11th Under Secretary of State for Arms Control and International Security
- In office April 1, 1993 – August 8, 1997
- Preceded by: Frank G. Wisner
- Succeeded by: John D. Holum

Personal details
- Born: 1943 (age 82–83)
- Education: Duke University (BA); Columbia University (MA, PhD)

Lynn Etheridge Davis (born 1943) was United States Under Secretary of State for Arms Control and International Security Affairs from 1993 to 1997.

== Biography ==
=== Education ===
Lynn E. Davis was educated at Duke University, receiving a B.A. in political science. She then received an M.A. and a Ph.D. in political science from Columbia University.

=== Career ===
After graduate school, Davis split her time between academia and government service. She taught political science at Columbia and national security policy at the National War College. She also worked on the staff of the United States Senate Select Committee on Intelligence and then the United States National Security Council. During the Carter administration, she served as Deputy Assistant Secretary of Defense for Policy Plans.

In 1985, Davis became Director of Studies of the International Institute of Strategic Studies in London. She held this position until 1989, when she joined the RAND Corporation at its headquarters in Santa Monica, California.

In February 1993, President of the United States Bill Clinton nominated Davis to be Under Secretary of State for Arms Control and International Security Affairs. After Senate confirmation, she subsequently held this office from April 1, 1993, until August 8, 1997.

After her time in the United States Department of State, Davis returned to the RAND Corporation.

== Works by Lynn E. Davis ==
- The Cold War Begins: Soviet/American Conflict Over Eastern Europe (Princeton University Press, 1974)
- Limited Nuclear Options: Deterrence and the New American Doctrine (Adelphi Paper No. 121, International Institute of Strategic Studies, 1975–76)
- with Harold Brown, Nuclear Arms Control Choices (Johns Hopkins, 1984)
- Assuring Peace in a Changing World: Critical Choices for the West's Strategic and Arms Control Policies (Foreign Policy Institute, 1990)
- An Arms Control Strategy for the New Europe (RAND, 1993)
- Peacekeeping and Peacemaking After the Cold War (RAND, 1993)
- with Jeremy Shapiro, The U.S. Army and the New National Security Strategy (RAND, 2003)
- Individual Preparedness and Response to Terrorism: Chemical, Radiological, Nuclear, and Biological Attacks: A Quick Guide (RAND, 2003)
- with John V. Parachini and Timothy Liston, Homeland Security: A Compendium of Public and Private Organizations' Policy Recommendations (RAND, 2003)
- Army Forces for Homeland Security (RAND, 2004)
- Stretched Thin: Army Forces for Sustained Operations (RAND, 2005)
- Hurricane Katrina: Lessons for Army Planning and Operations (RAND, 2007)
- with Melanie W. Sisson, A Strategic Planning Approach: Defining Alternative Counterterrorism Strategies as an Illustration (RAND, 2009)

== Sources ==
- Archived State Dept. Biography
- Profile from the RAND Corporation

Government offices
Preceded by Frank G. Wisner	Under Secretary for Arms Control and International Security; April 1, 1993 – August 8, 1997	Succeeded by John D. Holum
