= Judith A. Miller =

American attorney and government official

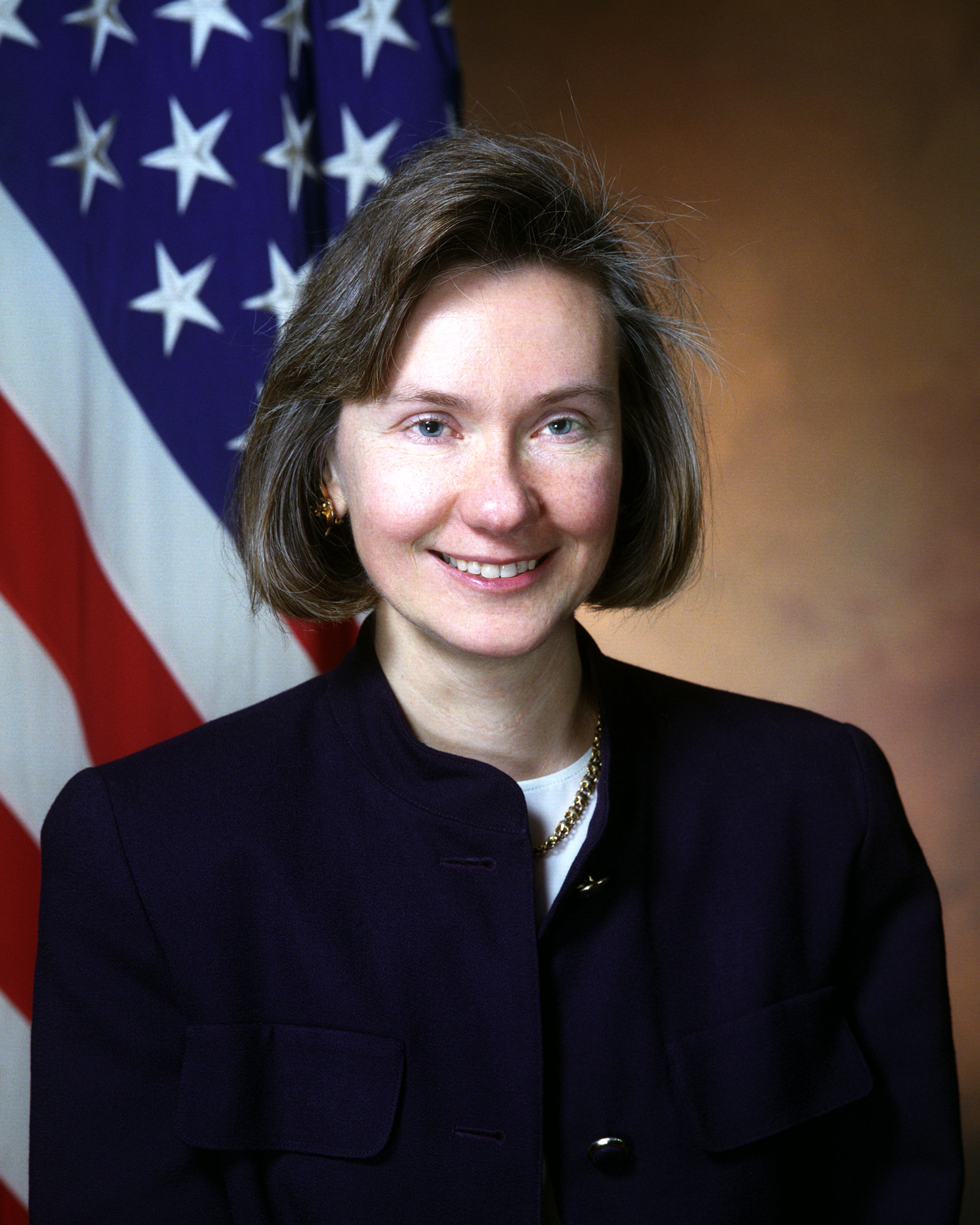

General Counsel of the Department of Defense
- In office September 29, 1994 – November 7, 1999
- President: Bill Clinton
- Preceded by: Jamie Gorelick
- Succeeded by: Douglas A. Dworkin

Personal details
- Born: August 3, 1950 (age 76) Dayton, Ohio
- Spouse: Peter Buscemi
- Education: Beloit College (B.A.); Yale Law School (J.D.)
- Occupation: Lawyer, government official
- Known for: Expert on international and contract law

Judith Ann Miller (born August 3, 1950) is an American attorney and government official who served as General Counsel of the United States Department of Defense from 1994 to 1999, and in the private sector as general counsel for Bechtel Group.

== Biography ==
Miller was born in Dayton, Ohio in 1950 and graduated as the valedictorian of Kettering Fairmont West High School in 1968. She then studied at Beloit College, where she majored in history and minored in economics and French. She received a B.A. summa cum laude and Phi Beta Kappa in 1972, again graduating as valedictorian. Miller attended Yale Law School, serving as an editor of the Yale Law Journal, and graduating with a J.D. in 1975. After law school, she clerked for Judge Harold Leventhal of the United States Court of Appeals for the District of Columbia Circuit, and then for United States Supreme Court Justice Potter Stewart in 1976-1977. Following her clerkships, from September 1977 to February 1979 she was Assistant to the Secretary and Deputy Secretary of Defense in the U.S. Department of Defense. Afterwards, she practiced law from 1979 at Williams & Connolly in Washington, D.C., where she was named a partner in 1985. She focused on litigation of defense contractor and corporate disputes, and criminal defense.

Miller served as General Counsel of the United States Department of Defense from September 29, 1994 to November 7, 1999, during the tenure of William Cohen as Secretary of Defense. In recognition of her work, she received the Department of Defense Medal for Distinguished Public Service. In January 1998, she was considered for the post of head of the Department of Veterans Affairs. After stepping down from public service, she returned to Williams & Connolly for six years. Then, from 2006 to 2010, she was general counsel and senior vice president of Bechtel Group, an international construction company.

Since 1992, Miller has served as a member of American Law Institute, and in 2010 was elected to the governing council. Her research interests include ethics and foreign relations. Among her honors, she was named by the Women's Bar Association of the District of Columbia as its "2006 Woman Lawyer of the Year."

Miller is also a member of the Atlantic Council's Board of Directors.

== Personal life ==
She is married to Peter Buscemi, who was a partner at Morgan Lewis specializing in Supreme Court appeals.

== See also ==
- List of law clerks for the eighth seat of the Supreme Court of the United States

== Select articles ==
- Miller, Judith A. (2001). "NATO's Use of Force in the Balkans". New York Law School Law Review. 45: 91. (Hein paid access)
- Miller, Judith A. (2002). "Reflections on National Security and International Law Issues During the Clinton Administration". Chicago Journal of International Law. 3 (1).
