= William F. Burns =

US Army major general (1932–2021)

William Burns
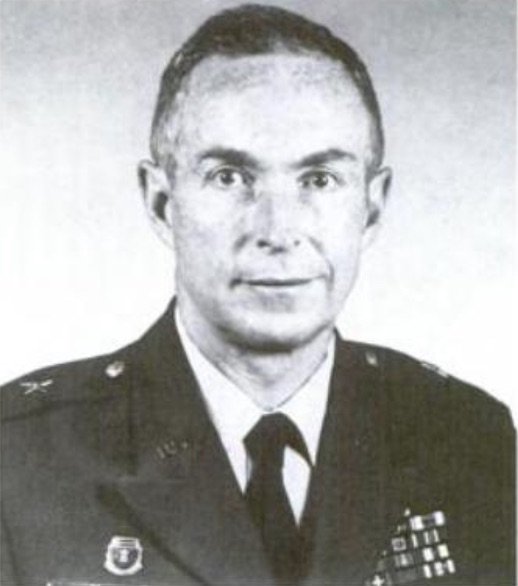
- Burns in the 1980s

Director of the Arms Control and Disarmament Agency
- In office April 1, 1988 – March 15, 1989
- President: Ronald Reagan; George H. W. Bush
- Preceded by: Kenneth Adelman
- Succeeded by: Ronald F. Lehman

Personal details
- Born: William Francis Burns; June 23, 1932 Scranton, Pennsylvania, U.S.
- Died: June 5, 2021 (aged 88) Carlisle, Pennsylvania, U.S.
- Spouse: Peggy Cassady (m. 1955)
- Children: 4, including Bill Burns
- Education: La Salle University (BA); Princeton University (MA)

Military service
- Allegiance: United States
- Branch/service: United States Army
- Years of service: 1954–1988
- Rank: Major General
- Battles/wars: Vietnam War

William Francis Burns (June 23, 1932 – June 5, 2021) was an American Army major general who later served as the Director of the Arms Control and Disarmament Agency from 1988 to 1989 under President Ronald Reagan.

He graduated from La Salle University in 1954 and joined the Army from ROTC in that same year. Reaching the rank of major general, Burns' commands included Deputy Assistant Secretary of State for Arms Control, Bureau of Politico-Military Affairs, Joint Chiefs of Staff Representative to the Intermediate-range Nuclear Forces negotiations from 1981 to 1984 and 1985 to 1986 as well as deputy commandant of the United States Army War College. He retired in 1988, and died on June 5, 2021, in Carlisle, Pennsylvania.

His son, William J. Burns, was a career Foreign Service Officer who served as US Deputy Secretary of State and as Director of the CIA under the Administration of President Joe Biden.

Diplomatic posts
Preceded by Kenneth Adelman	Director of the Arms Control and Disarmament Agency; 1988–1989	Succeeded by Ronald F. Lehman
