= Ronald F. Lehman =

Ronald Lehman
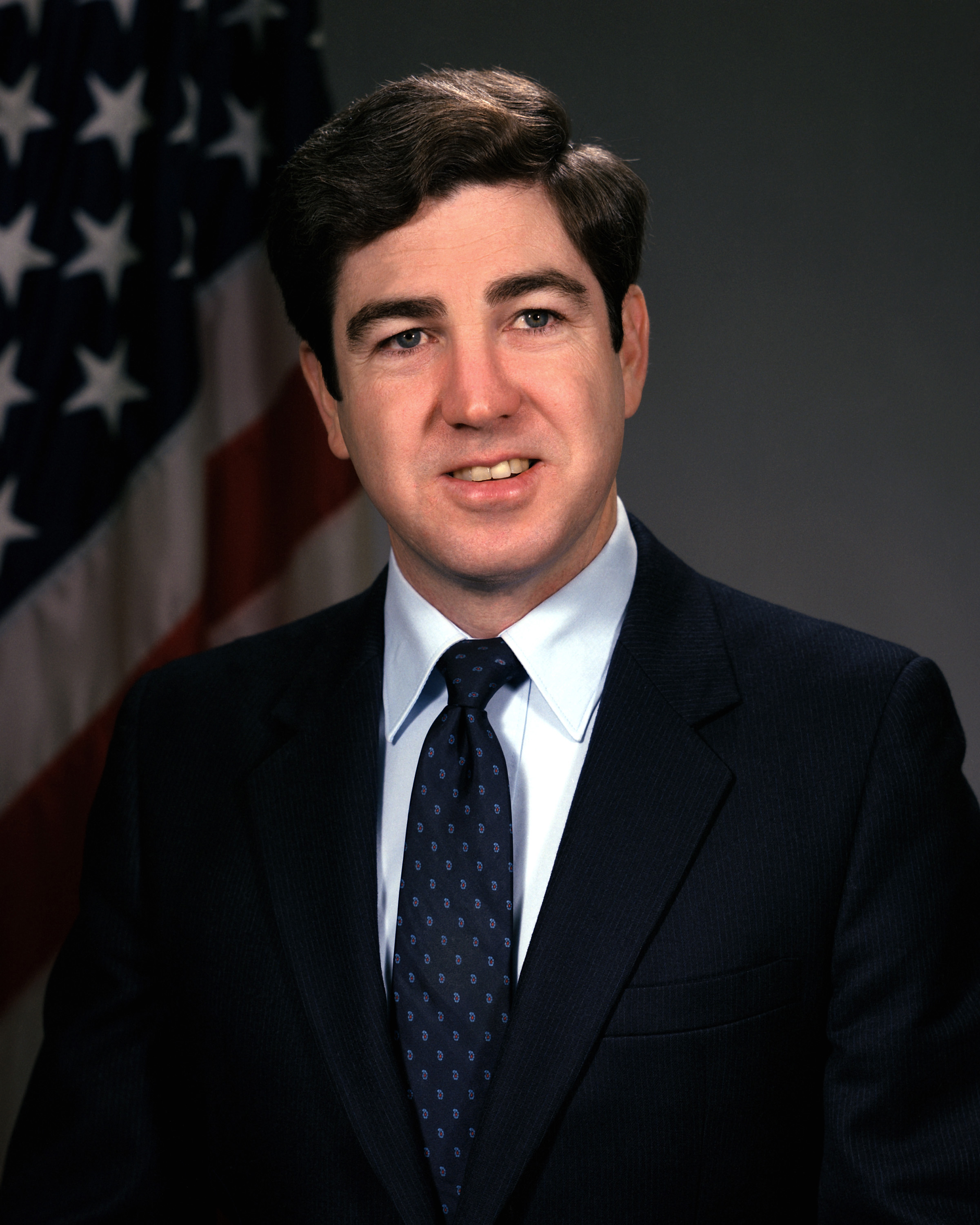

Director of the Arms Control and Disarmament Agency
- In office May 12, 1989 – January 20, 1993
- President: George H. W. Bush
- Preceded by: William F. Burns
- Succeeded by: John D. Holum

Assistant Secretary of Defense for International Security Policy
- In office February 18, 1988 – May 11, 1989
- President: Ronald Reagan; George H. W. Bush
- Preceded by: Frank Gaffney (acting)
- Succeeded by: Stephen Hadley

Personal details
- Born: Ronald Frank Lehman II; March 25, 1946 (age 80) Napa, California, U.S.
- Education: Claremont McKenna College (BA); Claremont Graduate University (MA, PhD)

Ronald Frank Lehman II (born March 25, 1946, in Napa, California) is currently Director of the Center for Global Security Research at the United States Department of Energy's Lawrence Livermore National Laboratory. He is also Chair of the Governing Board of International Science and Technology Center, an intergovernmental organization headquartered in Moscow and is a member of the Department of Defense Threat Reduction Advisory Committee.

He was Assistant Secretary of Defense for International Security Policy (now Assistant Secretary of Defense for Global Strategic Affairs) from 1988 to 1989 and then Director of the Arms Control and Disarmament Agency between 1989 and 1993. From 1985 to 1988, he served in the State Department as U.S. Chief Negotiator on Strategic Offensive Arms (START I) in Geneva. He has also served as Deputy Assistant to the President for National Security Affairs, senior director on the National Security Council, professional staff of the U.S. Senate Armed Services Committee, and in Vietnam with the United States Army. Lehman testified regularly before the U.S. Congress and was on the advisory board of the United States Institute of Peace. In 1995, he was appointed to the five-member President's Advisory Board on Arms Proliferation Policy.

Lehman was educated at Claremont McKenna College (B.A., 1968) and then Claremont Graduate University with an M.A. degree in 1969 and a Ph.D. degree in 1975, the same year he went to Washington, D.C., as a fellow of the Hoover Institution at Stanford University to begin his long and substantive diplomatic career in international arms control, disarmament, and the nonproliferation of weapons of mass destruction. He has served three U.S. Presidents (Reagan, Bush, and Clinton), three Secretaries of State, three Secretaries of Defense, and three National Security Advisors in a variety of senior executive and advisory positions to promote peace through international disarmament and nonproliferation policymaking. Lehman worked closely with President Reagan for many years and continues to honor his memory by continuing to stabilize national conflict and aids in the protection of the United States. He was the 1988 CGU Distinguished Alumni Award Recipient.

Political offices
Preceded by Frank Gaffney; Acting	Assistant Secretary of Defense for International Security Policy; 1988–1989	Succeeded by Stephen Hadley
Diplomatic posts
Preceded by William F. Burns	Director of the Arms Control and Disarmament Agency; 1989–1993	Succeeded by John D. Holum
