= James L. George =

American national security expert

James George
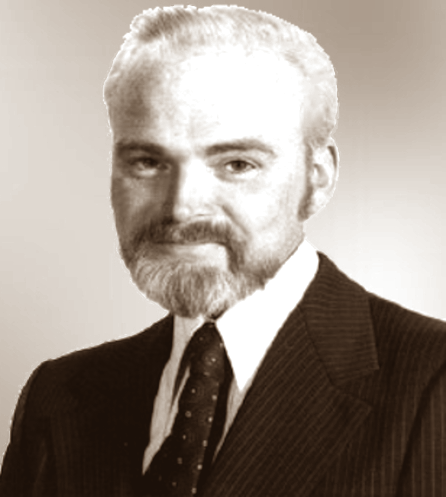

Director of the Arms Control and Disarmament Agency
- Acting
- In office January 13, 1983 – April 22, 1983
- President: Ronald Reagan
- Preceded by: Eugene V. Rostow
- Succeeded by: Kenneth Adelman

Personal details
- Born: James Leslie George; October 16, 1939 Chicago, Illinois, U.S.
- Died: August 24, 2000 (aged 60) Sarasota, Florida, U.S.
- Resting place: United States Naval Academy Cemetery
- Party: Republican
- Spouse(s): Patricia Kacsmar; Jean George
- Children: 2 (with Kacsmar)
- Education: United States Naval Academy (BS); University of Maryland, College Park (MA, PhD)

James Leslie George (October 16, 1939 – August 24, 2000) was an American national security expert, author, and political scientist known for his work in U.S. Naval and arms control during the Cold War era. From 1983 to 1984, George served as acintg director of the Arms Control and Disarmament Agency under President Ronald Reagan.

== Early life, education, and family ==
George was born in Chicago, Illinois to Leslie Cameron George (1910–1989), a World War II veteran and executive with International Harvester Corporation, and Muriel Mary (Monohan) George (1914–1993). George was then raised in Hamilton, Ontario, Canada, before returning to the United States for higher education.

In 1961, George graduated from the U.S. Naval Academy. He earned a Master’s Degree in Political Science (1969), and a Doctorate in International Relations (1972) at the University of Maryland. His doctoral thesis was entitled “Spheres of Influence.” George concluded his education as a Public Affairs Fellow at the Hoover Institution on War, Revolution and Peace at Stanford University.

George had two daughters from his first marriage to Patricia Roseanne (Kacsmar) George (born January 2, 1941): Laura Marilyn George (born October 2, 1961), founder of The Oracle Institute; and Leslie Morgan George (born August 12, 1964), a social worker. George had one brother, Richard Allan George (1935–1990), a painter who taught at Miami University in Ohio. George passed away in 2000, survived by his second wife Jean George. He is interred in the Naval Academy Cemetery in Annapolis, Maryland.

== Military and Civil Service career ==
George began his career at the U.S. Naval Academy in Annapolis, Maryland. After graduation, he served as a commissioned officer in the U.S. Navy during the Vietnam War. Forced to resign from the Navy due to an aggressive cancer, George then served as a Blue and Gold Officer, mentoring future generations of Naval Academy candidates.

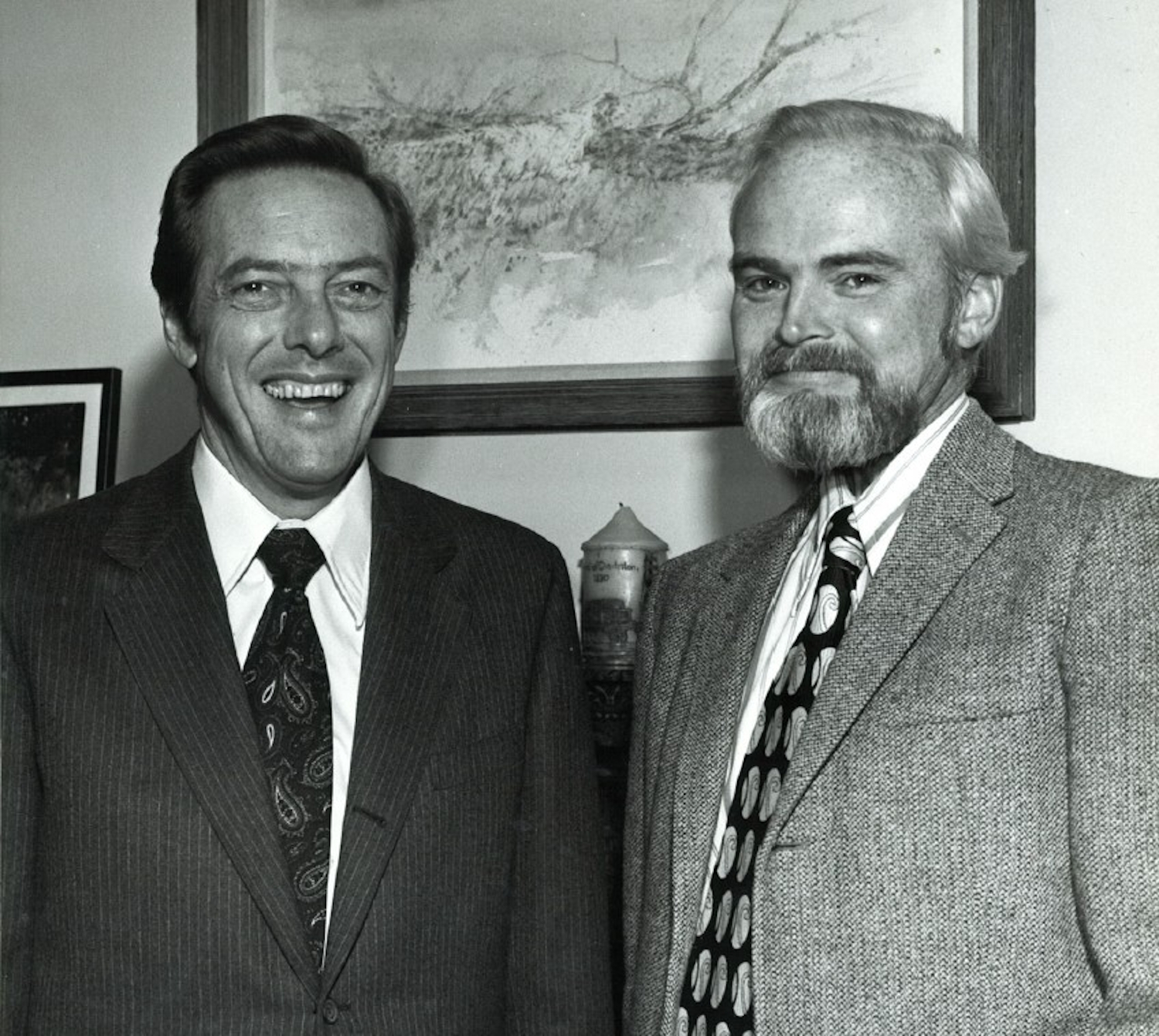
James George and Bill Brock

Mid-life, George’s career focused on national defense and strategic analysis. From 1973 to 1977, he was a staff member for Senator Bill Brock (R-Tenn.). He worked as a staff member on the Senate Operations Committee for National Security Affairs and the House Committee on Government Operations. From 1977 to 1982, George worked for the National Security Council.

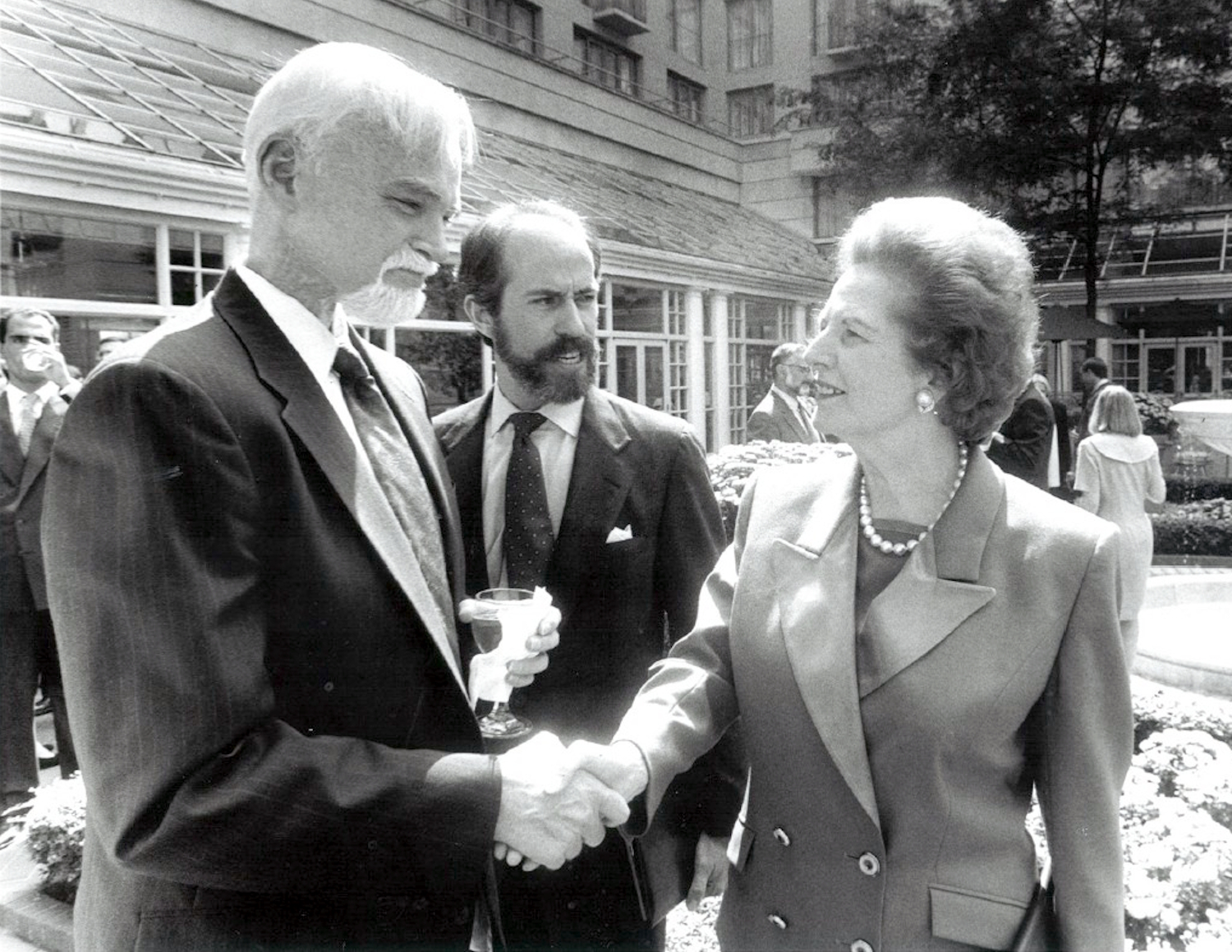
James George and Margaret Thatcher

He was appointed Assistant Director for Multilateral Affairs of the Arms Control and Disarmament Agency, where he was responsible for U.S. participation in various international arms control and disarmament systems and negotiations, and he served until May, 1984. In January 1983, George was appointed acting director of the agency. During his tenure, he helped negotiate the Intermediate-Range Nuclear Forces Treaty and the Strategic Arms Reduction Treaty (START I), both of which were signed later in the decade.

In 1992, George retired from public service and worked as a Senior Fellow at the Center for Naval Analyses and at the Hudson Institute, both in Washington, D.C.

== Awards ==
George received recognition for his written work in national security and naval affairs, primarily through his contributions to Proceedings, the journal of the U.S. Naval Institute. In the 1978 General Prize Essay Contest, George was awarded First Place for his essay entitled “The V/STOL Catch 22s.” In 1979, he received a medal for his essay “SALT and the Navy.” In 1981, he received a medal for his essay “Needed: Flying Squadrons for Flexibility.”

== Published works ==
George was a prolific author and editor of books and articles on naval strategy, arms control, and U.S. foreign policy. His writing credits include:

- “Is Readiness Overrated?: Implications for a Tiered Readiness Force Structure.” Cato Institute Policy Analysis, No. 342 (April 1999).
- History of Warships: From Ancient Times to the Twenty-First Century. Naval Institute Press (1998).
- “Framing the Defense Debates.” U.S. Naval Institute Proceedings, Vol. 123 (May 1997).
- “Needed: A Flexible Frigate.” U.S. Naval Institute Proceedings, Vol. 120 (May 1994).
- “Jettison JAST – Fast.” U.S. Naval Institute Proceedings, Vol. 120 (September 1994).
- “Where's the Admiral's Revolt?” U.S. Naval Institute Proceedings, Vol. 119 (May 1993).
- The U.S. Navy in the 1990s: Alternatives for Action. Navy Institute Press (1992).
- “A Strategy in the Navy’s Best Interest.” U.S. Naval Institute Proceedings, Vol. 117 (May 1991).
- The New Nuclear Rules: Strategy and Arms Control after INF and START. St. Martin’s Press (1990).
- The U.S. Navy: The View from the Mid-1980s. Westview Press (1986).
- The Soviet and Other Communist Navies: The View from the Mid-1980s. Naval Institute Press (1986).
- “SALT and the Navy.” U.S. Naval Institute Proceedings, Vol 105 (April 1986).
- One Year to Go?: Time for Negotiated Disarmament is Running Out. Menard Press (1982).
- “Needed: Flying Squadrons for Flexibility.” U.S. Naval Institute Proceedings, Vol. 107 (June 1981).
- Problems of Sea Power as We Approach the Twenty-First Century: Naval Forces and Weapons Platforms in the 1980s (1978).
- “The V/STOL Catch 22s.” U.S. Naval Institute Proceedings, Vol. 102 (April 1978).

Diplomatic posts
Preceded by Eugene V. Rostow	Director of the Arms Control and Disarmament Agency; Acting; 1983	Succeeded by Kenneth Adelman
