= John D. Holum =

American government official (born 1940)

John Holum
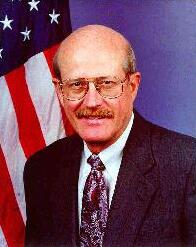

Under Secretary of State for Arms Control and International Security
- In office December 15, 1997 – May 11, 2001; Acting: December 15, 1997 – August 7, 2000
- President: Bill Clinton; George W. Bush
- Preceded by: Lynn E. Davis
- Succeeded by: John Bolton

Director of the Arms Control and Disarmament Agency
- In office November 22, 1993 – April 1, 1999
- President: Bill Clinton
- Preceded by: Ronald F. Lehman
- Succeeded by: Position abolished

Personal details
- Born: John David Holum; December 4, 1940 (age 85) Highmore, South Dakota, U.S.
- Party: Democratic
- Education: Northern Michigan University (BA); George Washington University (JD)

John David Holum (born December 4, 1940) was Director of the U.S. Arms Control and Disarmament Agency and Under Secretary of State for Arms Control and International Security under Bill Clinton.

== Biography ==
John D. Holum was born on December 4, 1940, in Highmore, South Dakota. He received a B.A. in mathematics and physics from Northern Michigan College (now Northern Michigan University) and a J.D. from George Washington University School of Law in 1970.

From 1965 to 1979 he worked as legislative director for Senator George McGovern. When McGovern ran for president in 1972, Holum wrote his 56-page position paper on defense policy, which advocated cutting the defense budget from $87.3 billion in 1972 to $54.8 billion in 1975, a proposal Theodore White characterized as "an extraordinary flight of one man's imagination." From 1979 to 1981, he worked as a Policy Planning staffer in the U.S. Department of State. From 1981 to 1992, he worked in Washington, D.C. for O'Melveny & Myers. In 1992, he joined Bill Clinton's campaign, until he was appointed as Director of the U.S. Arms Control and Disarmament Agency in 1993. He served as Acting Under Secretary of State for Arms Control and International Security from 1997 until he was confirmed in 2000. He left his job in 2001, with George W. Bush's administration.

Diplomatic posts
Preceded by Ronald F. Lehman	Director of the Arms Control and Disarmament Agency; 1993–1999	Position abolished
Preceded by Lynn E. Davis	Under Secretary of State for Arms Control and International Security; 1997–2001; Acting: 1997–2000	Succeeded by John Bolton
