= Kenneth Adelman =

American diplomat (born 1946)

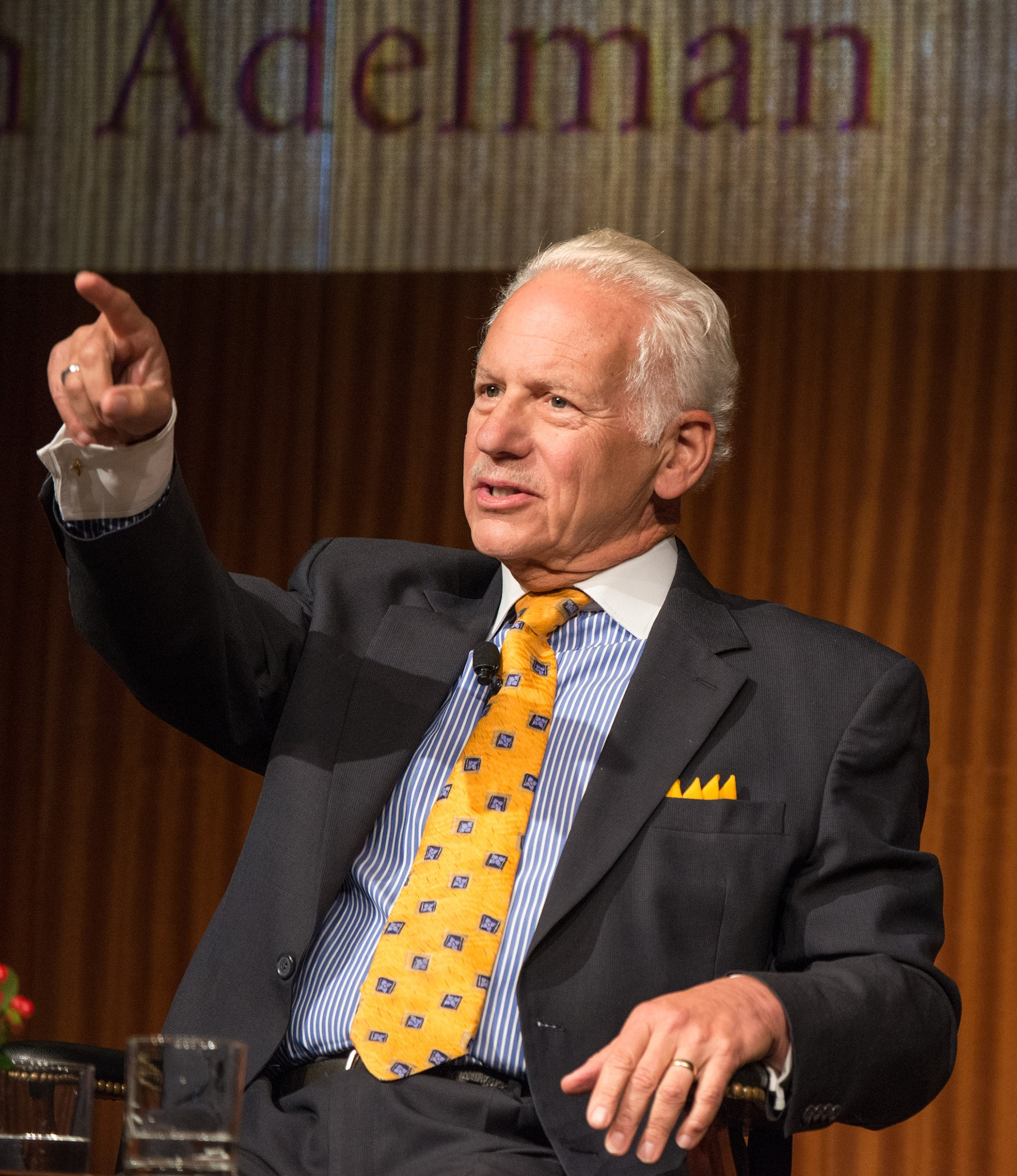

8th Director of the Arms Control and Disarmament Agency
- In office April 22, 1983 – December 12, 1987
- President: Ronald Reagan
- Preceded by: James L. George (acting)
- Succeeded by: William F. Burns

8th United States Deputy Ambassador to the United Nations
- In office July 29, 1981 – April 22, 1983
- President: Ronald Reagan
- Preceded by: William vanden Heuvel
- Succeeded by: José S. Sorzano

Personal details
- Born: Kenneth Lee Adelman; June 9, 1946 (age 80)
- Party: Republican
- Education: Grinnell College (BA); Georgetown University (MA, PhD)

Kenneth Lee Adelman (born June 9, 1946) is an American diplomat, political writer, policy analyst and Shakespeare scholar. Adelman has been a member of the board of directors of the global data collection company RIWI Corp. since June 2016.

== Early career ==
Adelman was born to a Jewish family and graduated from Grinnell College in Iowa, majoring in philosophy and religion. He received his master's degree in Foreign Service studies and doctorate in political theory from Georgetown University.

Adelman began working for the federal government in 1969 at the U.S. Department of Commerce and then served in the Office of Economic Opportunity. From 1975 to 1977 during the Gerald Ford administration, Adelman was an Assistant to United States Secretary of Defense Donald Rumsfeld and was later a member of the Defense Policy Board. He has also served as a national editor of Washingtonian magazine for more than 17 years.

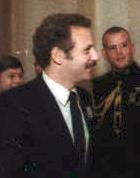
Ken Adelman, 1981

He was the deputy U.S. Ambassador to the United Nations, working under Jeane Kirkpatrick. He also served as the Director of the U.S. Arms Control and Disarmament Agency for nearly five years during the Reagan administration. He was an advisor to President Ronald Reagan during the superpower summits between Reagan and Soviet General Secretary Mikhail Gorbachev.

He took part in the Zaire River Expedition in 1975, travelling down the Congo River on the 100th Anniversary of Henry Morton Stanley's exploration.

In 1981, he was selected to be one of the first "Young Leaders" of the French-American Foundation.

== Later career ==
Adelman was a member of the Pentagon's Defense Policy Board and was involved in conservative policy efforts dating back to the 1970s when he was a member of the Committee on the Present Danger. He strongly supported the war on Iraq and worked for the think tank Project for the New American Century, arguing for new policies to help the United States remain a global leader. Adelman, called "a lifelong neocon activist", worried in 2006 that the incompetence shown in handling the war in Iraq would damage the neoconservative movement; neoconservatism, he said, "is not going to sell" for at least a generation.

Adelman went on to become senior counsel at Edelman Public Relations, where he led several campaigns linked to U.S. trade and intellectual property interests via the organization USA Innovations, an organization he also leads. Using the USA Innovations platform and through other published articles Adelman has attacked the Thai government for violating U.S. pharmaceutical industry HIV/AIDS drug intellectual property patents and other topics linked to Edelman Public Relations clients.

Adelman is also an expert on William Shakespeare and has taught extension school classes at Georgetown University and George Washington University on Shakespeare. He co-wrote with Norman R. Augustine a book on drawing leadership lessons from Shakespeare, called Shakespeare in Charge: The Bard's Guide to Leading and Succeeding on the Business Stage. He is known for invocations of Shakespeare in favor of his political positions, including an NPR analysis of a scene from Othello in support of the invasion of Iraq, and lauding President Bush as King Henry V.

== Iraq war ==
Adelman wrote a pair of editorial columns regarding the Iraq War in the Washington Post in February 2002 and April 2003 entitled, respectively, "Cakewalk In Iraq" and "'Cakewalk' Revisited". In the first he argued that the U.S.-led invasion of Iraq would be a simple matter to accomplish: "I believe that demolishing Hussein's military power and liberating Iraq would be a cakewalk". In the later editorial, published just a few weeks after the invasion, he claimed his vindication and in particular praised key Bush administration players: "My confidence 14 months ago sprang from having worked for Don Rumsfeld three times—knowing he would fashion a most creative and detailed war plan—and from knowing Dick Cheney and Paul Wolfowitz well for many years".

Also notable are Adelman's predictions regarding weapons of mass destruction in Iraq. Adelman said that weapons were likely to be near Tikrit and Baghdad, "because they're the most protected places with the best troops. I have no doubt we're going to find big stores of weapons of mass destruction".

In an article first appearing on the website of Vanity Fair in November 2006, Adelman wrote that he regrets urging military action in Iraq and feels that he overestimated the abilities of the Bush administration leadership. He was quoted as saying "I just presumed that what I considered to be the most competent National Security team since Truman was indeed going to be competent". He also added, "They turned out to be among the most incompetent teams in the postwar era. Not only did each of them, individually, have enormous flaws, but together they were deadly, dysfunctional". He wrote that the conduct of the war "just breaks your heart," and it "didn't have to be managed this bad; it's awful."

In an article in The New Yorker, Adelman said of Rumsfeld, a friend and associate of 36 years: "How could this happen to someone so good, so competent? This war made me doubt the past. Was I wrong all those years, or was he just better back then? The Donald Rumsfeld of today is not the Donald Rumsfeld I knew, but maybe I was wrong about the old Donald Rumsfeld. It's a terrible way to end a career. It's hard to remember, but he was once the future."

== Support for Barack Obama ==
The New Yorker reported on October 20, 2008, that Adelman decided to buck his conservative leanings and vote for Senator Barack Obama for President on November 4, 2008. According to The New Yorker, Adelman made his decision primarily for two reasons, "those of temperament and of judgment". He explained:

When the economic crisis broke, I found John McCain bouncing all over the place. In those first few crisis days, he was impetuous, inconsistent, and imprudent; ending up just plain weird. Having worked with Ronald Reagan for seven years, and been with him in his critical three summits with Gorbachev, I've concluded that that's no way a president can act under pressure.

Second is judgment. The most important decision John McCain made in his long campaign was deciding on a running mate.

That decision showed appalling lack of judgment. Not only is Sarah Palin not close to being acceptable in high office—I would not have hired her for even a mid-level post in the arms-control agency. But that selection contradicted McCain's main two, and best two, themes for his campaign—Country First, and experience counts. Neither can he credibly claim, post-Palin pick.

Soon after he authored a Huffington Post article entitled "Why a Staunch Conservative Like Me Endorsed Obama" where he wrote, "Granted, McCain's views are closer to mine than Obama's. But I've learned over this Bush era to value competence along with ideology. Otherwise, our ideology gets discredited, as it has so disastrously over the past eight years." He added, "McCain's temperament—leading him to bizarre behavior during the week the economic crisis broke—and his judgment—leading him to Wasilla—depressed me into thinking that "our guy" would be a(nother) lousy conservative president. Been there, done that".

A Reuters article quotes Adelman as saying, "I am a Republican and only voted for one Democrat in my entire life, and that was very much an anti-McCain vote. I thought Obama was going to be better than he turned out to be." Reuters also reported that he was backing Romney.

== Support for Joe Biden ==
In 2020, Adelman, along with over 130 other former Republican national security officials, signed a statement that asserted that President Trump was unfit to serve another term, and "To that end, we are firmly convinced that it is in the best interest of our nation that Vice President Joe Biden be elected as the next President of the United States, and we will vote for him."

Diplomatic posts
Preceded by James L. George; Acting	Director of the Arms Control and Disarmament Agency; 1983–1987	Succeeded by William F. Burns
