= George M. Seignious =

United States Army general

George Seignious
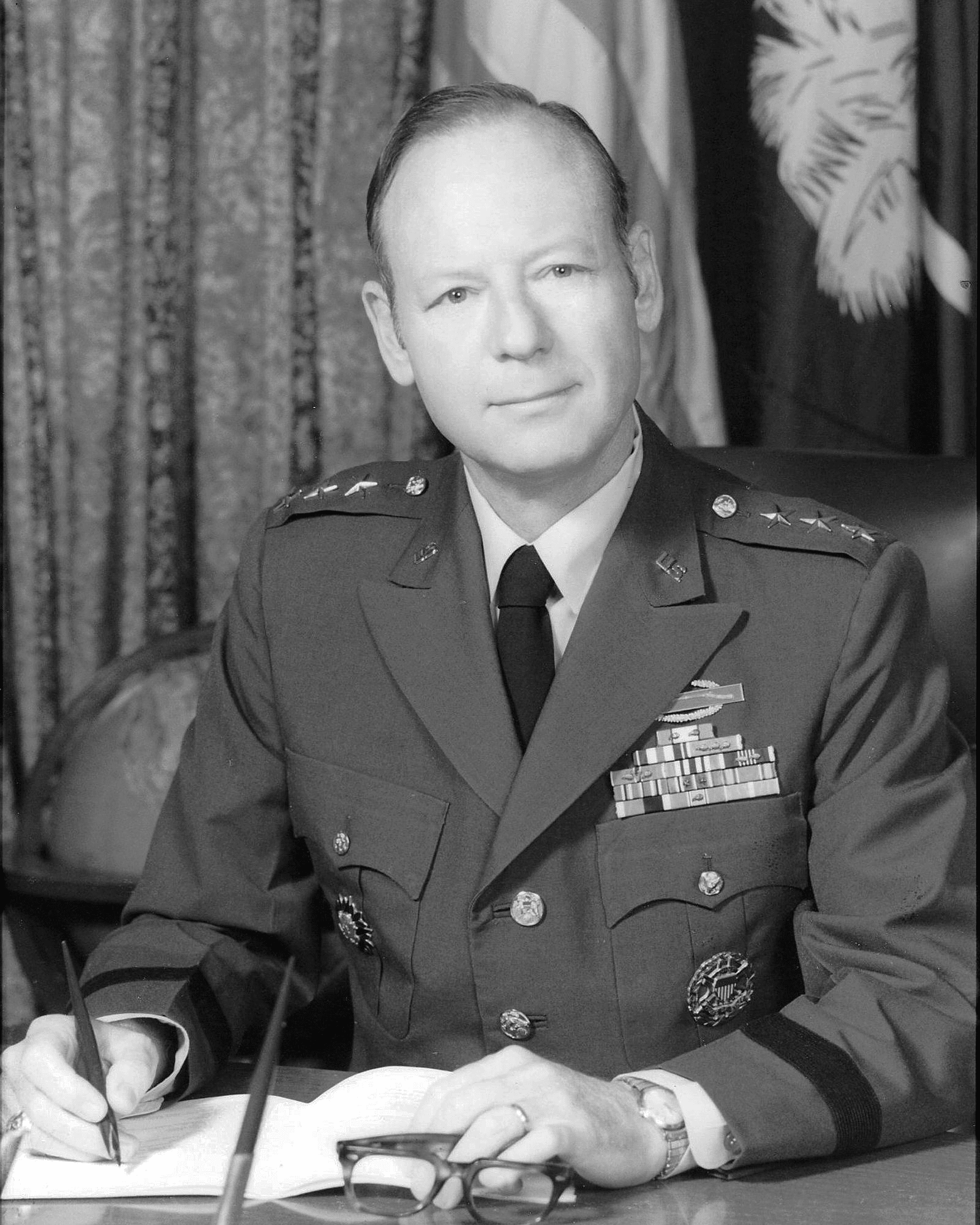

Director of the Arms Control and Disarmament Agency
- In office December 4, 1978 – January 3, 1980
- President: Jimmy Carter
- Preceded by: Paul Warnke
- Succeeded by: Ralph Earle

Personal details
- Born: George Marion Seignious II; June 21, 1921 Orangeburg, South Carolina, U.S.
- Died: July 3, 2005 (aged 84) Charleston, South Carolina, U.S.
- Resting place: Beaufort National Cemetery
- Education: The Citadel (BS); National Defense University (MS)

Military service
- Allegiance: United States
- Branch/service: United States Army
- Years of service: 1942–1974
- Rank: Lieutenant General
- Commands: 11th Armored Cavalry Regiment; 3d Infantry Division; United States Army Berlin
- Battles/wars: World War II
- Awards: Silver Star; Army Distinguished Service Medal (3); Bronze Star Medal; Legion of Merit (4); Joint Service Commendation Medal

George Marion Seignious II (June 21, 1921 – July 3, 2005) was a distinguished military leader, diplomat and college president.

== Biography ==
General Seignious was born and raised in Orangeburg, South Carolina but attended high school in Kingstree; he was a 1942 graduate of The Citadel where he held the rank of Cadet Major and served as a Battalion Commander, his classmates included future South Carolina Governors John C. West and Ernest Hollings who was also a long time U.S. senator. He was commissioned as an Infantry Officer in the United States Army and won the Silver Star while serving as a Platoon Leader with the 10th Armored Division in the European Theater of Operations during World War II. Postwar assignments included attending the Army Armor School at Fort Knox, Kentucky; training officer with the Military Assistance Group in Brazil and as a staff officer with the Caribbean Command in Panama.

During the 1950s he served as Assistant Executive Secretary to the Joint Chiefs of Staff at the Pentagon, attended the Joint Services Staff College in England and served with the Military Assistance Advisory Group in Spain. From 1957 to 1960 he was the Military Assistant to Secretary of the Army Wilber Marion Brucker, in 1961 he graduated from the National War College at National Defense University; he then returned to Europe to assume command of the 11th Armored Cavalry Regiment followed by tours on the staff of U.S. Army, Europe and as Chief of Staff of the 3d Infantry Division. In 1964 he became one of the youngest generals in Army history at the age of 42.

Returning to Washington, DC he was assigned as Director of Policy Plans for the Assistant Secretary of Defense and served as a military advisor to the delegation of Secretary of State Dean Rusk at the ANZUS and SEATO treaty negotiations followed by duty as deputy director for Policy and Plans (J-5) for the Joint Chiefs of Staff. In June 1968 President Lyndon Johnson appointed Seignious to the critical and sensitive role of Military Advisor to the Paris Peace Talks, the following year he was promoted to major general and became Commanding General of the 3d Infantry Division in Germany, in 1970 he assumed command of U.S. Army, Berlin where he also served as a military advisor to Ambassador Kenneth Rush during the Quadripartite Negotiations on Berlin.

Returning to the Pentagon he served concurrently as Deputy Assistant Secretary of Defense for International Security Affairs and Director, Defense Security Assistance Agency. Promoted to Lieutenant General in 1972 he was appointed as the first Director of the Joint Staff for the Joint Chiefs of Staff; he retired in July, 1974 after being selected as the 14th President of his alma mater The Citadel.

During his tenure enrollment soared after suffering from the anti-military sentiment of the Vietnam War; endowments and scholarships were increased, a new physical education building was completed and major renovations were made to the barracks, mess hall and main academic building. He resigned as president in March, 1979 when President Jimmy Carter appointed him as Director of the Arms Control and Disarmament Agency where he had a major role in the delicate negotiations with the Soviet Union over the Strategic Arms Limitations Treaty. In 1981 President Ronald Reagan made him Delegate-at-Large for Arms Control Negotiations with the rank of Ambassador; after retiring from public service in 1984 he served as President of the Atlantic Council, a foreign policy think tank. He was later chairman of the board for a high tech telecommunications company and also served as a trade representative for the state of South Carolina.

General Seignious died in Charleston on July 3, 2005; his funeral service took place in Summerall Chapel at The Citadel and he was buried with full military honors at the National Cemetery in Beaufort. In addition to the Silver Star his military awards included 3 awards of the Distinguished Service Medal and Bronze Star Medal, 4 awards of the Legion of Merit and the Joint Service Commendation Medal. Seignious Hall, the football facility at The Citadel is named in his honor.

== Awards and decorations ==
Combat Infantry Badge
Distinguished Service Medal with 2 Oak Leaf Clusters
Silver Star
Bronze Star with 2 Oak Leaf Clusters
Legion of Merit with 3 Oak Leaf Clusters
Joint Service Commendation Medal
Army Commendation Medal with 2 Oak Leaf Clusters
American Campaign Medal
European-African-Middle Eastern Campaign Medal
|World War II Victory Medal
Army of Occupation Medal
National Defense Service Medal with 1 Service Star
Armed Forces Expeditionary Medal

Diplomatic posts
Preceded by Paul Warnke	Director of the Arms Control and Disarmament Agency; 1978–1980	Succeeded by Ralph Earle
