= G. Warren Nutter =

American economist

- Born: March 10, 1923; Topeka, Kansas, U.S.
- Died: January 15, 1979 (aged 55); Charlottesville, Virginia, U.S.

Academic background
- Education: University of Chicago

G. Warren Nutter (March 10, 1923 – January 15, 1979) was an American economist, who was known primarily for his work on political economy, industrial concentration, price theory, and Soviet economic history and for cofounding the "Virginia school of political economy."

== Biography ==
Nutter was born in Topeka, Kansas, on March 10, 1923, under the name Gilbert Warren Nutter, but went by his middle name.

Nutter eventually settled in Chicago, Illinois. His education at the University of Chicago was interrupted by service in the US Army infantry in the European Theatre in World War II. He earned the Bronze Star with oak leaf cluster (which means that he received the Bronze Star twice) and the Combat Infantryman Badge. After serving in US Army intelligence after the fall of Nazi Germany, he returned to finish his studies at the University of Chicago, earning his B.A. (1946), M.A. (1948), and Ph.D. (1949) in economics, which he had studied with Milton Friedman and Frank Knight.

While finishing his Ph.D. at Chicago, he lectured in economics and German at Lawrence College (now Lawrence University) in Appleton, Wisconsin. He later was an associate professor of economics at Yale University (1950–1956) and professor of economics at the University of Virginia (1956–1979). He died after a prolonged bout with colon and liver cancer.

Nutter's academic career was twice more interrupted by public service. First, in 1951, during the Korean War, he was called to duty from the U.S. Army Reserves. He served in the Central Intelligence Agency. From 1969 to 1973, he served as assistant secretary of defense for international security affairs during the first administration of President Richard Nixon.

== Academic contributions ==
Nutter made significant contributions to both technical and political-economic literature. His areas of research interest and contribution included industrial concentration, Soviet economic history, price theory and political economy. He was also active in academic exchange between the East and West blocs during the Cold War.

His doctoral dissertation published in 1949, and later reworked and republished as Enterprise Monopoly In The United States: 1899-1958 (1969, Columbia University Press) authored with Henry Einhorn, attacked the prevailing notion that US industry trended toward increased concentration except when government regulation intervened to prevent concentration. Nutter's work showed that on the contrary, government intervention over the long run can tend to increase, rather than lessen, industrial concentration.

From 1956 to 1961, under the sponsorship of the National Bureau of Economic Research, Nutter undertook a massive study of the history of the economy of the Soviet Union culminating in the publication of his 1962 book The Growth of Industrial Production in the Soviet Union.

His extensively documented study attempted to correct the widely held view that Soviet industrial production had grown at a pace much greater than that of Western economies. The study concluded that Soviet economic growth over the first half of the 20th century was indeed remarkable and that there had been periods of growth spurts which, taken out of historical context, might suggest that the Soviet Union would eventually overtake the United States in economic capacity. However, when the entire Soviet period was taken into consideration, Soviet growth lagged behind Western economies and Soviet economic capacity showed every sign of falling further behind rather than catching up with the West. At the time of its publication, the study's conclusions were not highly regarded by many Sovietologists, who held that Soviet growth rates were much higher than those represented by the study. In the intervening years, as the fall of the Soviet Union revealed more realistic data, Nutter's estimates of Soviet growth rates have been vindicated; in fact, Nutter overstated rather than understated Soviet economic performance.

He and James M. Buchanan are credited with founding the Thomas Jefferson Center for Studies in Political Economy in 1957, whose objective was to focus on the study of political economy: not only the technical aspects of economics but also of the philosophical foundations of social organization and economic activity. The Center sponsored and funded a wide array of academic studies and interaction aimed at better understanding the role of the fundamental ideas of Western civilization as the foundation for free societies and economies.

During the late 1950s and 1960s, Nutter and Buchanan together worked to build within the Economics Department of the University of Virginia, the so-called Virginia school of political economy. The department attracted a number of prominent academics including Ronald Coase, Gordon Tullock, Alexandre Kafka, George Stigler, and Leland B. Yeager.

Nutter died of cancer on January 15, 1979, at his home in Charlottesville, Virginia.
