= Arms Control and Disarmament Agency =

1961–1999 independent agency of the US government

U.S. Arms Control and Disarmament Agency (ACDA)

Agency overview
- Formed: September 26, 1961
- Preceding agency: U.S. Department of State: U.S. Disarmament Administration
- Dissolved: April 1, 1999
- Superseding agency: U.S. Department of State: Bureau of Political-Military Affairs, Bureau of Arms Control, Bureau of Nonproliferation

The U.S. Arms Control and Disarmament Agency (ACDA) was an independent agency of the United States government that existed from 1961 to 1999. Its mission was to strengthen United States national security by "formulating, advocating, negotiating, implementing and verifying effective arms control, nonproliferation, and disarmament policies, strategies, and agreements".

In so doing, ACDA ensured that arms control was fully integrated into the development and conduct of United States national security policy. ACDA also conducted, supported, and coordinated research for arms control and disarmament policy formulation, prepared for and managed U.S. participation in international arms control and disarmament negotiations, and prepared, operated, and directed U.S. participation in international arms control and disarmament systems.

== 1961 creation ==
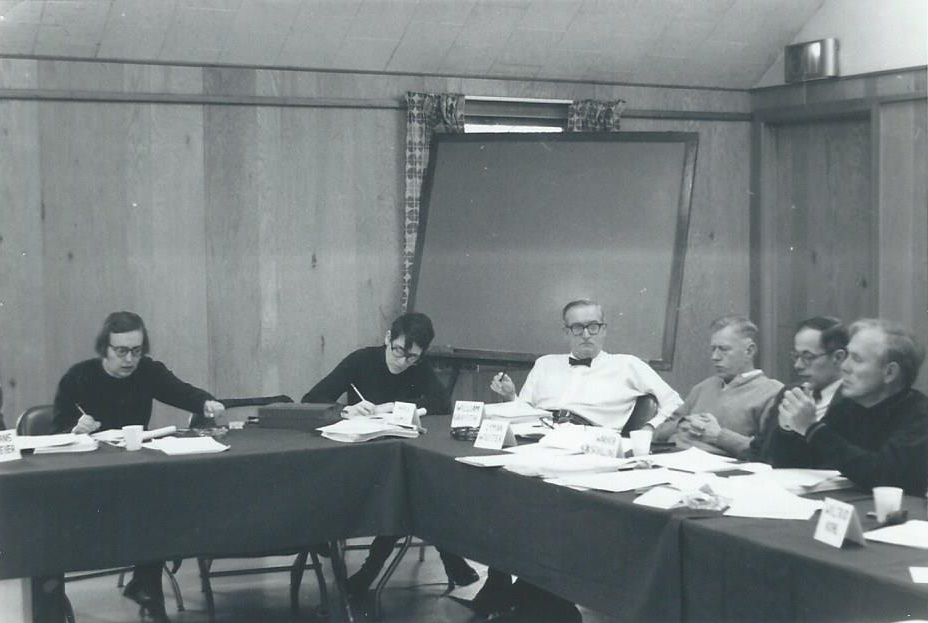
Scholars discussing issues of American defense posture and European security during a 1969 ACDA meeting at Lake Mohonk, New York

The Arms Control and Disarmament Agency was established by the Arms Control and Disarmament Act, Pub. L. 87–297, 75 Stat. 631, enacted September 26, 1961. The H.R. 9118 bill was drafted by presidential adviser John J. McCloy. Its predecessor was the U.S. Disarmament Administration as part of the U.S. Department of State from September 9, 1960, though President Dwight D. Eisenhower never appointed a director and John F. Kennedy named McCloy as its first director until ACDA's formation.

== Early mission ==
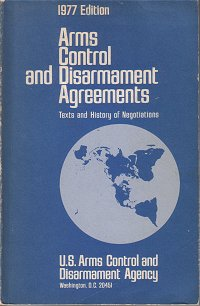
Cover of a 1977 ACDA report on the history of arms control agreements

In the 1970s emphasis of the agency was placed upon gaining an understanding of the strategic weapons capabilities of the Soviet Union and People's Republic of China. The electronic reconnaissance capability of the United States was expanded through federal agency research and private contract research, utilizing radio frequency as well as optical technologies. The theory of this mission was that a clearer understanding of other nations' strategic capabilities was an important initial step in prevention of nuclear war.

== 1997 reorganization ==
In 1997, the Clinton administration announced the partial integration of ACDA with the State Department as part of the reinvention of the agencies which implement the nation’s foreign policy.

The ACDA director served as both the under secretary of state for arms control and international security affairs and a senior adviser to the president and the secretary of state for arms control, nonproliferation, and disarmament. He communicated with the president through the secretary of state. In his capacity as senior advisor to the president, the under secretary attended and participated, at the direction of the president, in National Security Council (NSC) and subordinate meetings pertaining to arms control, nonproliferation, and disarmament and had the right to communicate, through the secretary of state, with the president and members of the NSC on arms control, nonproliferation, and disarmament concerns.

== 1999 end ==
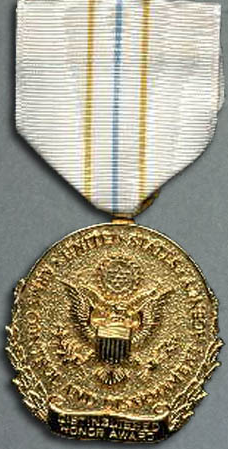
People working for ACDA were eligible to receive honor awards for their efforts

As of April 1, 1999, ACDA was abolished and its functions merged into the Department of State. This was done pursuant to Pub. L. 105–277 (text) (PDF), 112 Stat. 2681, enacted October 21, 1998. The functions of the ACDA director were replaced by the office of the Under Secretary of State for Arms Control and International Security Affairs and by the office of the Senior Advisor to the President and the Secretary of State for Arms Control, Nonproliferation, and Disarmament. ACDA's bureaus, along with the State Department's Bureau of Political-Military Affairs, were moved to the Under Secretary for Arms Control and International Security to form four bureaus: Political-Military Affairs, Bureau of Arms Control, Bureau of Nonproliferation, and the Bureau of Verification and Compliance. Additional reorganizations of the arms control function took place in subsequent years, and as of 2023, those functions are carried out by the Bureau of Political-Military Affairs, the Bureau of Arms Control, Verification and Compliance, and the Bureau of International Security and Nonproliferation.

== List of directors ==
The directors of the Arms Control and Disarmament Agency were:

=== Special Assistant to the President for Disarmament ===
Name	Start	End	President(s)
Harold Stassen	March 19, 1955	February 15, 1958	Dwight D. Eisenhower (1953–1961)

=== Director of the Disarmament Administration ===
Name	Start	End	President(s)
Jack McCloy	January 27, 1961	October 6, 1961	John F. Kennedy (1961–1963)

=== Directors of the Arms Control and Disarmament Agency ===
Denotes acting capacity.

Name	Start	End	President(s)
William Foster	October 6, 1961	December 31, 1968	John F. Kennedy (1961–1963)
William Foster	October 6, 1961	December 31, 1968	Lyndon B. Johnson (1963–1969)
Gerard Smith	February 7, 1969	January 4, 1973	Richard Nixon (1969–1974)
Fred Iklé	July 10, 1973	January 19, 1977	Richard Nixon (1969–1974)
Fred Iklé	July 10, 1973	January 19, 1977	Gerald Ford (1974–1977)
Paul Warnke	March 14, 1977	October 31, 1978	Jimmy Carter (1977–1981)
George Seignious	December 4, 1978	January 3, 1980	Jimmy Carter (1977–1981)
Ralph Earle	January 3, 1980	January 15, 1981	Jimmy Carter (1977–1981)
Eugene Rostow	June 30, 1981	January 12, 1983	Ronald Reagan (1981–1989)
James George; Acting	January 13, 1983	April 22, 1983	Ronald Reagan (1981–1989)
Kenneth Adelman	April 22, 1983	December 12, 1987	Ronald Reagan (1981–1989)
William Burns	April 1, 1988	March 15, 1989	Ronald Reagan (1981–1989)
William Burns	April 1, 1988	March 15, 1989	George H. W. Bush (1989–1993)
Ronald Lehman	May 12, 1989	January 20, 1993	George H. W. Bush (1989–1993)
John Holum	November 22, 1993	April 1, 1999	Bill Clinton (1993–2001)
