= Kathleen A. Buck =

American politician (1948–2001)

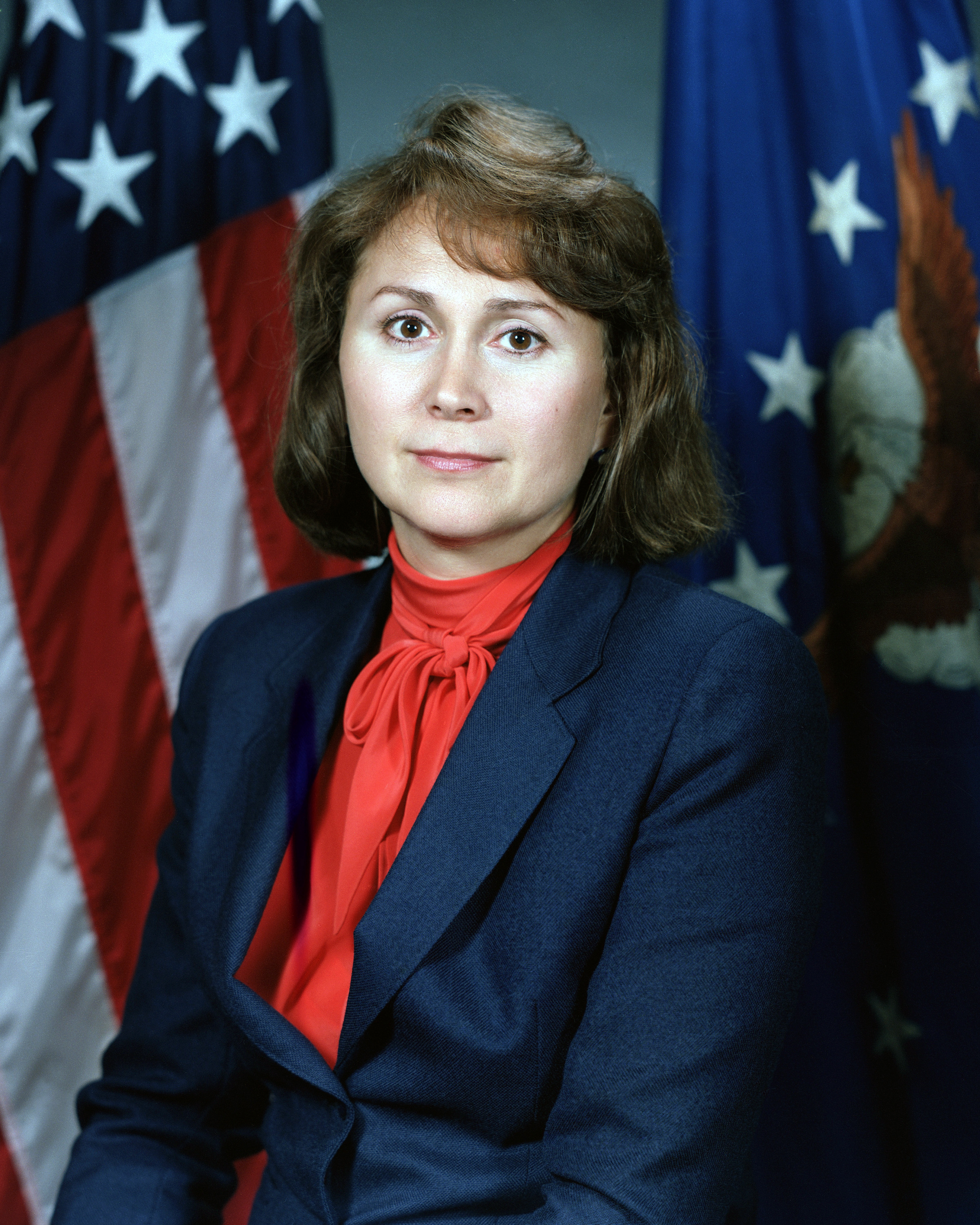

General Counsel of the Department of Defense
- In office October 26, 1987 – December 30, 1989
- President: Ronald Reagan; George H.W Bush
- Preceded by: Henry L. Garrett III
- Succeeded by: Terrence O'Donnell

Personal details
- Born: Kathleen Ann Buck; November 14, 1948 South Bend, Indiana
- Died: August 12, 2001 (aged 52) Baltimore, Maryland
- Spouse: Raymond Battocchi
- Children: 2
- Parent: Betty Buck
- Occupation: Attorney - Politician

Kathleen Ann Buck (November 14, 1948 – August 12, 2001) was an American attorney and politician who served as the General Counsel of the Department of Defense under presidents Ronald Reagan and George H.W Bush from October 1987 to December 1989. She was nominated by Reagan in July 1987 and was confirmed in October. She previously was an attorney, having studied at the Indiana University School of Law.

== Early life and education ==
Kathleen Ann Buck was born on November 14, 1948, in South Bend, Indiana. Her mother was Betty Buck, who resided in Elkhart, Indiana, and she was one out of the four children in her family.

After graduating from high school, Buck went to St. Mary's College and graduated with a Bachelor of Arts in Political Science in 1970. Buck also studied at Indiana University School of Law in Bloomington, Indiana. She worked at the office at Bloomington City Attorney, Fort Wayne Legal Services, and the Monroe County Probation Department. Buck graduated with a Juris Doctor in 1973 and later moved to Washington D.C to work at Swift & Company.

== Political career ==
Buck's political career began in 1981 when she worked in the Defense Department as an Assistant General Counsel. She then moved to General Counsel of the Air Force in 1986. In October 1987, she was appointed by Ronald Reagan as the General Counsel of the Department of Defense, where she succeeded Henry L. Garrett III. She held this position until December 30, 1989.

After her term, she worked at Kirkland & Ellis where she specialised in federal regulation, legislation and policy.

== Personal life and death ==
Buck was married to Raymond Battocchi but then got a divorce. They had 2 children named Adam and Brian Battocchi. She lived in Great Falls, Virginia. Buck died on August 12, 2001, after battling with leukemia in the University of Maryland Hospital in Baltimore, Maryland. She was 52.

=== Legacy ===
A loan repayment program named The Kathleen Buck Loan Repayment Assistance Program was established as a tribute to her. It helps undergraduate students repay their loans.
