= Martin Richard Hoffmann =

U.S. government official (1932–2014)

Martin Hoffmann
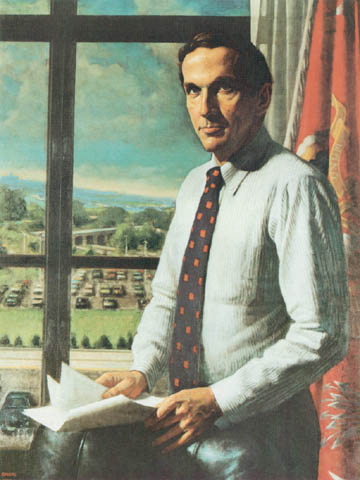
- Official portrait, c. 1977

12th United States Secretary of the Army
- In office August 5, 1975 – January 20, 1977
- President: Gerald Ford
- Preceded by: Howard H. Callaway; Norman R. Augustine (Acting)
- Succeeded by: Clifford Alexander Jr.

Personal details
- Born: Martin Richard Hoffmann; April 20, 1932 Stockbridge, Massachusetts, U.S.
- Died: July 14, 2014 (aged 82) Warrenton, Virginia, U.S.
- Party: Republican
- Spouse: Margaret McCabe
- Education: Princeton University (BA)

Military service
- Allegiance: United States
- Branch/service: United States Army; United States Army Reserves
- Years of service: 1954–1958; 1958–1975 (Reserves)
- Rank: Major

Martin Richard Hoffmann (April 20, 1932 – July 14, 2014) was a U.S. administrator. He served as the United States Secretary of the Army between 1975 and 1977.

== Early life ==
Martin was born in Stockbridge, Massachusetts, on April 20, 1932. He served in the United States Army from September 1954 to November 1955, and was a US Army Officer from November 1955 to May 1958. He served in the Army (Officer) Reserve until October 22, 1975, retiring with the rank of Major.

== Government career ==
Hoffmann served as general counsel of the Department of Defense from 1974 to 1975. He was appointed as Secretary of the Army from August 5, 1975, until February 13, 1977.

== Death ==
Martin Richard Hoffmann died of cancer in 2014, aged 82.

Government offices
Preceded by Howard H. Callaway	United States Secretary of the Army; August 1975 – January 1977	Succeeded by Clifford L. Alexander Jr.
