= John McNaughton (government official) =

US Assistant Defense Secretary and law school professor

John T. McNaughton
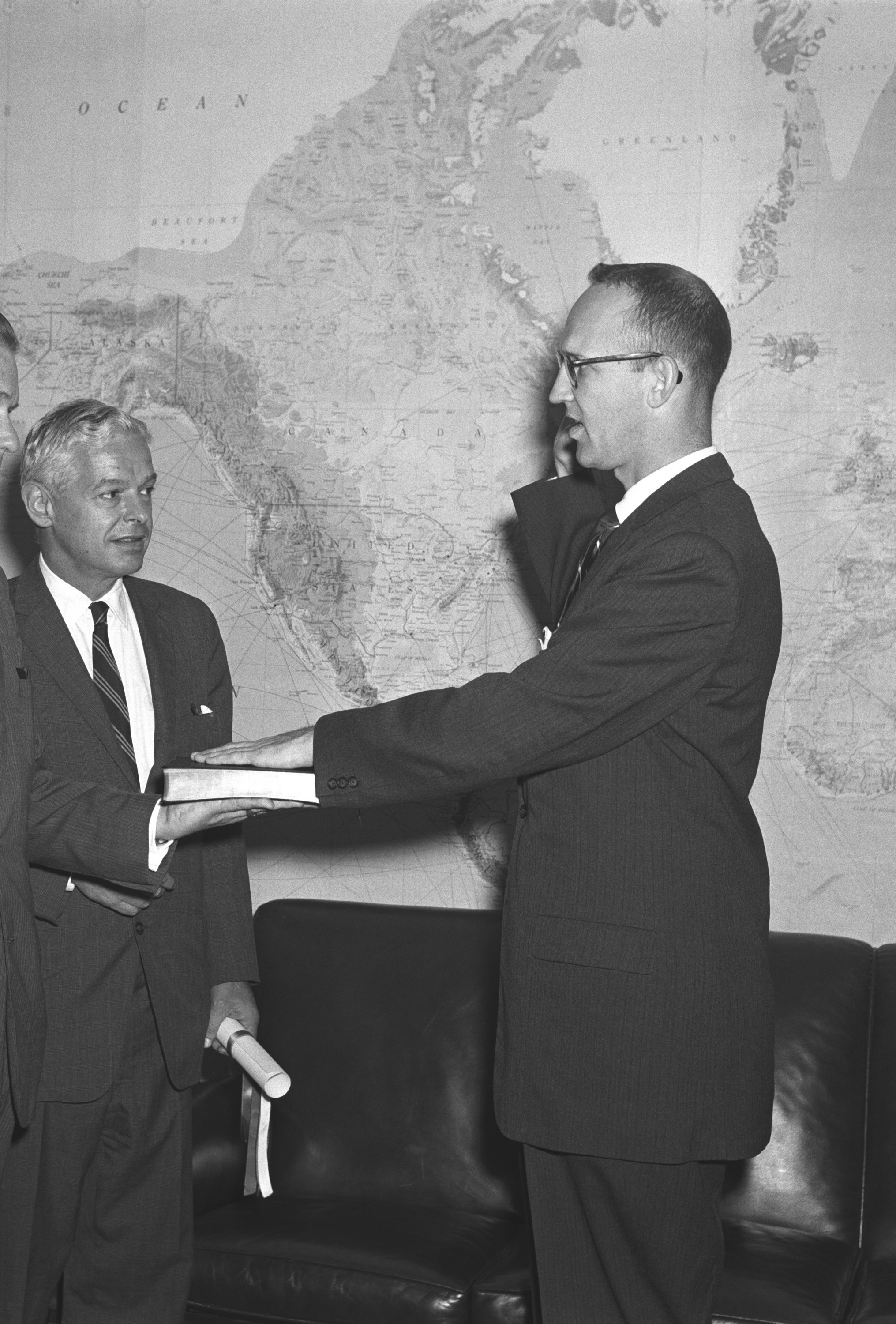
- McNaughton (right) taking the oath of office to become Deputy Assistant Secretary of Defense, ISA in 1963

United States Secretary of the Navy - designate
- Died before assuming office
- Preceded by: John Connally
- Succeeded by: Paul B. Fay (Acting)

Personal details
- Born: November 21, 1921 Bicknell, Indiana, U.S.
- Died: July 19, 1967 (aged 45) Hendersonville, North Carolina, U.S.
- Party: Democratic
- Education: DePauw University (BA); Harvard University (LLB); Oriel College, Oxford (BLitt)

John Theodore McNaughton (November 21, 1921 – July 19, 1967) was an American government official who was United States Assistant Secretary of Defense for International Security Affairs and Robert S. McNamara's closest advisor. He died in a plane crash at age 45, just before he was to become Secretary of the Navy.

== Early life ==
John McNaughton was born in Bicknell, Indiana; his father owned the Bicknell Daily News. The family moved to Pekin, Illinois in his younger years because his father later owned the Pekin Daily Times. John McNaughton graduated in 1942 from DePauw University. He joined the United States Navy that year and served on ships in the Atlantic. In 1946, he entered the Harvard Law School graduating in 1948. He was named a Rhodes Scholar that same year and spent 1949 at Oxford. In 1950, he took a year off and took a position in the European Payments Union under the Marshall Plan. He returned to the United States in 1951 and became editor of the Pekin Daily Times. A year later, he ran for Congress in Illinois's 18th District as a Democrat. He was defeated in the election by Republican Harold H. Velde.

== Career ==
Tall and fast-talking McNaughton began his career as an academic as an associate professor at the Harvard Law School in 1953. Major General Charles J. Timmes later said that McNaughton, during a discussion of the Vietnam War, had asserted that one could find the solution to any problem "by simply dissecting it into all its elements and then piecing together the resultant formula".

He had been friends with strategic theorist (and later Nobel prize winner in economics) Thomas Schelling since they worked in the administration of the Marshall Plan in Paris. In 1964, when McNaughton and Schelling were teaching at Harvard, Schelling was asked to work at the Department of Defense. He suggested McNaughton go instead, promising to advise McNaughton on weapons and strategy; McNaughton was appointed Assistant Secretary of Defense for International Security Affairs.

Together, they outlined a bombing strategy to intimidate North Vietnam in the spring of 1964, leading to the first phase of Operation Rolling Thunder which took place between March 2 and 24, 1965.

The conditions for a bombing halt, outlined in a confidential memorandum by McNaughton to McNamara were that North Vietnam must not only cease infiltration efforts, but also take steps to withdraw troops currently operating in South Vietnam. In addition, the Viet Cong should agree to terminate terror and sabotage activities and allow Saigon to exercise "governmental functions over substantially all of South Vietnam."

The North Vietnamese did not react to the bombing in the ways the American officials expected. North Vietnam was not intimidated by the bombing. Political reality had proved more complex than the abstract models of game theory.

In 1966 McNaughton and his deputy Adam Yarmolinsky had to admit, in a JASON study, that the air strikes had failed.

A pragmatist, McNaughton understood that only one aspect of the war effort was not a double-edged sword and could make the difference in the long term: the effort to turn South Vietnam into a viable political society, able to withstand the North's assault with U. S. help. In March 1965, McNaughton told President Johnson that while such efforts might not pay off quickly enough to affect the present ominous deterioration, some may, and we are dealing here in small critical margins. Furthermore, such investment [was] essential to provide a foundation for the longer run.

McNaughton was referencing the nation-building strategy devised by the Major-General Edward Lansdale, who had become a counterinsurgency expert after defeating the Huk rebellion in the Philippines in the 1950s, Sir Robert Thompson — a British counter-insurgency expert and Roger Hilsman — a former American guerilla in Burma and the director of intelligence for the Department of State in the Kennedy administration. Edward Lansdale had made the point that the South's dependency on aid had the effect of placing the U.S. in the position of providing major help on an endless basis, with the consequence that if such aid were lessened then the enemy would win.

== Personal life ==
He was married to Sarah Elizabeth "Sally" Fulkman (born February 14, 1921). They had two sons, Alexander "Alex" and Theodore "Ted" (born July 23, 1955).

McNamara confided privately that McNaughton could have been his choice to replace him as Secretary of Defense. McNaughton resigned from the post of Assistant Secretary of Defense and was to become Secretary of the Navy on August 1, 1967 after being confirmed by the United States Senate. However, he was killed in the Piedmont Airlines Flight 22 accident with his wife and younger son Theodore on July 19, 1967. He was buried in Arlington National Cemetery. The bridge carrying Illinois Route 9 across the Illinois River in Pekin, Illinois is named after McNaughton. There is also a John T. McNaughton Park just northeast of Pekin.
