= Eshelman (disambiguation) =

Eshelman was a marque of small American automobiles (1953–1961) and other vehicles and implements

Eshelman may also refer to:

- Eshelman (surname)
- Eshelman Motors Corporation
- UNC Eshelman School of Pharmacy
- Eshelman FW-5, a monoplane
