= Cheston =

Cheston is both a surname and a given name. Notable people with the name include:

- Ernest Cheston (1848–1918), English rugby player
- Evelyn Cheston (1875–1929), English artist
- Sheila C. Cheston (born c. 1960), American lawyer
- Cheston Lee Eshelman (1917–2004), American inventor and businessman

== See also ==
- Cheston, Devon, a settlement in southwest England
