= Gilbert F. Casellas =

American lawyer and businessman

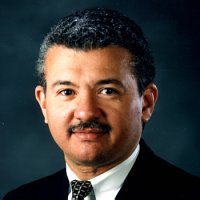

Chair of the Equal Employment Opportunity Commission
- In office September 29, 1994 – December 31, 1997
- Preceded by: Tony Gallegos (acting)
- Succeeded by: Paul Igasaki (acting)

General Counsel of the Air Force
- In office 1993–1994
- Preceded by: Anne N. Foreman
- Succeeded by: Sheila C. Cheston

Personal details
- Born: August 2, 1952 (age 74) Tampa, Florida, U.S.
- Education: Yale University (BA); University of Pennsylvania (JD)
- Occupation: Lawyer, businessman

Gilbert F. Casellas (born August 2, 1952) is an American lawyer and businessman. He is a private investor and business consultant in the Washington, D.C. area, a director of Prudential Financial, trustee of the University of Pennsylvania, and advisor to Toyota Motor North America, T-Mobile US, and Comcast Corporation. He is a member of the Council on Foreign Relations, the American Law Institute, trustee of the Pan American Development Foundation and co-editor-in-chief of Workplace Harassment second edition (2018), published by Bloomberg Law.

== Early life and education ==
Gilbert F. Casellas was born and raised in the Ybor City section of Tampa, Florida, and attended the segregated St. Peter Claver School until he was twelve years old. He worked his way through the Jesuit High School of Tampa. He was awarded a financial scholarship to Yale University in 1970, and received a B.A. in Latin American studies in 1974. In 1977, he received a J.D. from the University of Pennsylvania School of Law.

== Career ==
Following law school, Casellas served a two-year clerkship with the Honorable A. Leon Higginbotham, Jr., of the United States Court of Appeals for the Third Circuit.

From 1980 through 1993, he practiced with the Philadelphia law firm of Montgomery, McCracken, Walker and Rhoads where he specialized in civil litigation. He ultimately served as a member of the Management Committee and as Personnel Partner, overseeing all professional personnel matters for all 165 lawyers, in the entire firm.

In 1984, Casellas was elected National President of the Hispanic National Bar Association, serving as the leader and spokesperson for the thousands of Hispanic American lawyers in the United States. In 1989, he became the president of the University of Pennsylvania Law Alumni Society, representing the interests of the thousands of graduates of the Law School. Locally in Philadelphia, he served as chair of the board of governors of the Philadelphia Bar Association, chair of its Young Lawyers Section, as well as chair of numerous bar association committees. He also served as a member of the House of Delegates of the American and Pennsylvania Bar Associations and member of the American Bar Association's Commission on Opportunities for Minorities in the Profession, among others.

In 1977, he helped to form, and served as outside counsel to, the Latino Project, Inc., a public interest law firm engaged in protecting the rights of Philadelphia's Latino community. He later served as a board member of The Public Interest Law Center of Philadelphia, Community Legal Services, the Philadelphia Bar Foundation, and the United Way of Southeastern Pennsylvania.

He was called upon in many other civic and public matters in Philadelphia. He served as a member of the Mayor's Commission on Puerto Rican/Latino Affairs. During 1990, he was called upon and served on a pro bono publico basis as Special Counsel to the Philadelphia Commission on Human Relations during its citywide inquiry into concerns of Philadelphia's Latino community following a summer of unrest arising out of the arrests and treatment of several Latino youths. In 1985, he was appointed by the federal court to serve as a receiver to negotiate and settle fee disputes in three job discrimination class action lawsuits by Latinos against the City of Philadelphia's Police and Fire Departments. With Court approval, in 1986 he directed a portion of the proceeds from the successful fee resolution of those class actions to establish a scholarship for Latino law students at the University of Pennsylvania and personally supplemented the fund in 2008.

=== Public service experience ===
In 1993, Casellas was appointed by President Bill Clinton and unanimously confirmed by the U.S. Senate as General Counsel of the United States Department of the Air Force. In that capacity, he served as chief legal officer and final legal authority to more than 2,000 military, civilian and reserve attorneys throughout the world. During this period, he also served as the governor of Wake Island. Among his accomplishments, he provided essential legal support for streamlining acquisition processes to achieve National and Defense Performance Review Objectives and ensured legal authority was available to indemnify the Civil Reserve Air Fleet for contingency operations in Somalia and Haiti. He also served as a member of the Defense Department's Task Force on Discrimination and Sexual Harassment. For his leadership and superior achievements, he was presented with the Department of the Air Force Decoration for Exceptional Civilian Service.

In July 1994, President Bill Clinton called upon him to leave the Pentagon and serve as Chairman of the Equal Employment Opportunity Commission (EEOC), an office for which he was confirmed unanimously and in which he served with well-recognized distinction until 1998. As chairman of the commission, he served as the chief administrative official for all operations of the commission, its fifty field offices, its 2700 employees and its annual budget of $250 million.

As EEOC chairman, Casellas led broad changes in the way the Commission does business, including streamlining its case-handling system, expanding the use of alternative dispute resolution, forging a new and productive partnership with nearly 100 state and local fair employment practices agencies, and developing practical policy guidelines on applying the EEO laws to the workplace. For his personal intervention in successfully resolving the EEOC's historically acrimonious internal labor-management disputes and in transforming the agency into a model of labor-management partnership, the agency received a "Hammer of Reinvention" from Vice President Al Gore.

In accepting his resignation with regret, President Bill Clinton stated that "you have helped restore Americans' trust that the EEOC is an agency dedicated to providing prompt and fair enforcement of civil rights laws. In these and in many other ways, you have been an important part of our mission to make America a nation of equal opportunity for all."

The changes instituted during his tenure remain largely in place today. His legacy and imprint on the commission were recognized by The New York Times in a front-page article more than a year after his departure. That February 22, 1999, story noted that "Much of the credit for the commission's resurrection has gone to Mr. Casellas, who presided over an overhaul beginning about five years ago to bring down the backlog, promoted alternative ways to resolve disputes, including mediation and arbitration, and looked to file high-profile lawsuits against companies that jolted other companies into becoming aware of the practices that often spawned discrimination complaints….That the agency is being looked on more favorably is, to some longtime observers in the field, nothing short of amazing."

=== Volunteer public service activities ===
In 1998, after he stepped down as EEOC Chair, President Clinton appointed him to the bi-partisan Census Monitoring Board to oversee the conduct of Census 2000 and named him co-chair of the board in 1999. Created by Congress to monitor the largest peacetime mobilization in U.S. history, the Census Monitoring Board was given responsibility for monitoring all aspects of Census 2000, including operational planning, implementation, and post-census analysis. A detailed account of the activities and accomplishments of the Presidential members is contained in the final report to Congress dated September 1, 2001, and is archived at http://govinfo.library.unt.edu/cmb/cmbp/.

=== Private sector activities ===
During 1998, Casellas managed the Washington, D.C. office of the San Juan, Puerto Rico–based law firm of McConnell Valdés. There he developed a national employment law practice, advising some of the world's largest companies on diversity, equal employment opportunity and anti-discrimination policies.

In April 1998, he was elected to the board of directors of The Prudential Insurance Company of America and later in 2001, to its newly created holding company, Prudential Financial, Inc. In January 1999, he left the practice of law when he was named president of The Swarthmore Group, Inc., a registered investment advisory firm. Its assets under management grew from $275 million to $1 billion during his two-year tenure and today ranks among the largest minority-owned asset management firms in the United States.

From 2001 through 2006, Casellas also served as a court-appointed member of the Oversight Task Force that monitored the terms of the $192.5 million race discrimination class action settlement by The Coca-Cola Company. The Task Force oversaw broad changes to Coca-Cola's personnel policies and practices throughout its North American operations and reported its findings in annual reports to the federal court in Georgia.

In June 2005, he joined the Washington DC office of Mintz Levin Cohn Ferris Glovsky & Popeo, PC in its Corporate Diversity Risk Management Group advising national and international companies and institutions on diversity issues.

In October 2007, he joined Dell Inc as vice president for Corporate Responsibility where he led the creation of an integrated and global diversity, sustainability and corporate giving function. After stepping down in 2010, he joined OMNITRU, a Washington, DC–based investment and consulting firm.

In recognition of his leadership in corporate workforce diversity, he was appointed in 2007 to Toyota Motor North America's Diversity Advisory Board and in 2012 was named Chairman of the National Hispanic Advisory Council of Comcast's Joint Diversity Council. In 2009, he was appointed by the Obama Administration to serve as one of the civilian members of the Military Leadership Diversity Commission. Prior to this appointment, and following the withdrawal of Governor Bill Richardson as Secretary of Commerce nominee, Casellas' name surfaced as a potential nominee to the post of Secretary of Commerce. In a January 16, 2013, letter to President Obama, a coalition of thirty of the largest and most influential Latino civil rights and advocacy organizations included his name among 19 potential candidates for cabinet posts.

=== Teaching, advocacy and philanthropy ===
As a third year law student, Casellas served as an Arthur Littleton Legal Writing Teaching Fellow, teaching legal research and writing to first year law students. During his years as a practicing lawyer in Philadelphia, he served as a Lecturer-in-Law at the University of Pennsylvania School of Law, teaching courses on trial and appellate advocacy. He also regularly lectured in CLE programs. In 1995, he was elected to the membership of the American Law Institute.

In 1996, Casellas was elected a trustee of the University of Pennsylvania. From 1997 through 2006, he was a member of its executive committee. He chaired the Neighborhood Initiatives Committee from 1997 until 2007, and thus oversaw the university's innovative neighborhood collaboration that revitalized the West Philadelphia community and became a national model for university civic engagement. He served as chair of the Board of Overseers of the School of Social Work (later renamed the School of Social Policy and Practice) from 1997 to 2003, and currently serves as an Overseer of the School of Nursing. In addition to supplementing the endowment of the Latino Project scholarship established at the Law School in 1986, he established the Gilbert F. Casellas Trustee Scholarship for undergraduate financial aid. In June 2006, in recognition of his service, he was elected a Charter Trustee of the university, a lifetime appointment. In June 2017, he was named Trustee Emeritus of the University of Pennsylvania. From 2005 through 2008, he chaired the board of directors of the Hispanic Federation, Inc., an umbrella organization whose 100 member agencies serve the health and human service needs of over one million Latinos in New York, New Jersey, Connecticut and Pennsylvania. He previously served as a member of the boards of the Woodrow Wilson National Fellowship Foundation, The American Arbitration Association, the National Constitution Center and the Puerto Rican Legal Defense and Education Fund.

=== Awards and honors ===
Casellas' many contributions have been acknowledged with numerous awards, including the Spirit of Excellence Award from the American Bar Association, the Clarence Farmer Service Award from the Philadelphia Commission on Human Relations, the Alumni Award of Merit from the University of Pennsylvania Law Alumni Society, The Alumni Award of Distinction from Penn's Association of Latino Alumni, and the Lifetime Mentor Award from the Latin American Law Students Association of Temple University. He is also the recipient of a Decoration for Exceptional Civilian Service from the U.S. Department of the Air Force. He is also the recipient of the "Lucero" award from LatinoJustice/PRLDEF and in November 2017 was awarded the Alumni Award of Merit by the University of Pennsylvania. In 2018, he was named to the National Association of Corporate Directors list of 100 most influential corporate directors.

In 1997, he was named to the Hispanic National Bar Association's "short list" of potential candidates for the U.S. Supreme Court.

=== Lasting legacy on the EEOC ===
Priority Charge Handling Procedures (PCHP) were adopted unanimously by the full five member Commission in 1995. In its first few years, the policy assisted the agency by providing additional flexibility to field investigators and supervisors. In the years following implementation, the PCHP policy had a dramatic impact on case processing. It greatly increased agency efficiency, sped up case processing, and for the first time in decades, reduced the case load on the Federal Judiciary. However, in the decades following its implementation, and under the use of new commissioners, the PCHP policy has become problematic. Due to a decades long stagnant budget, the EEOC now uses the policy to discharge complaints it can no longer afford to investigate. These practices have led to frustration among those filing civil rights charges, as their complaints are often dismissed without agency review.

Government offices
Preceded by Anne N. Foreman	General Counsel of the Air Force; 1993–1994	Succeeded by Sheila C. Cheston
Preceded by Evan J. Kemp, Jr. Tony Gallegos (acting)	Chairman of the Equal; Employment Opportunity Commission; 1994–1998	Succeeded by Paul Igasaki (acting); Ida L. Castro
