= Jeh Johnson =

American lawyer and former government official (born 1957)

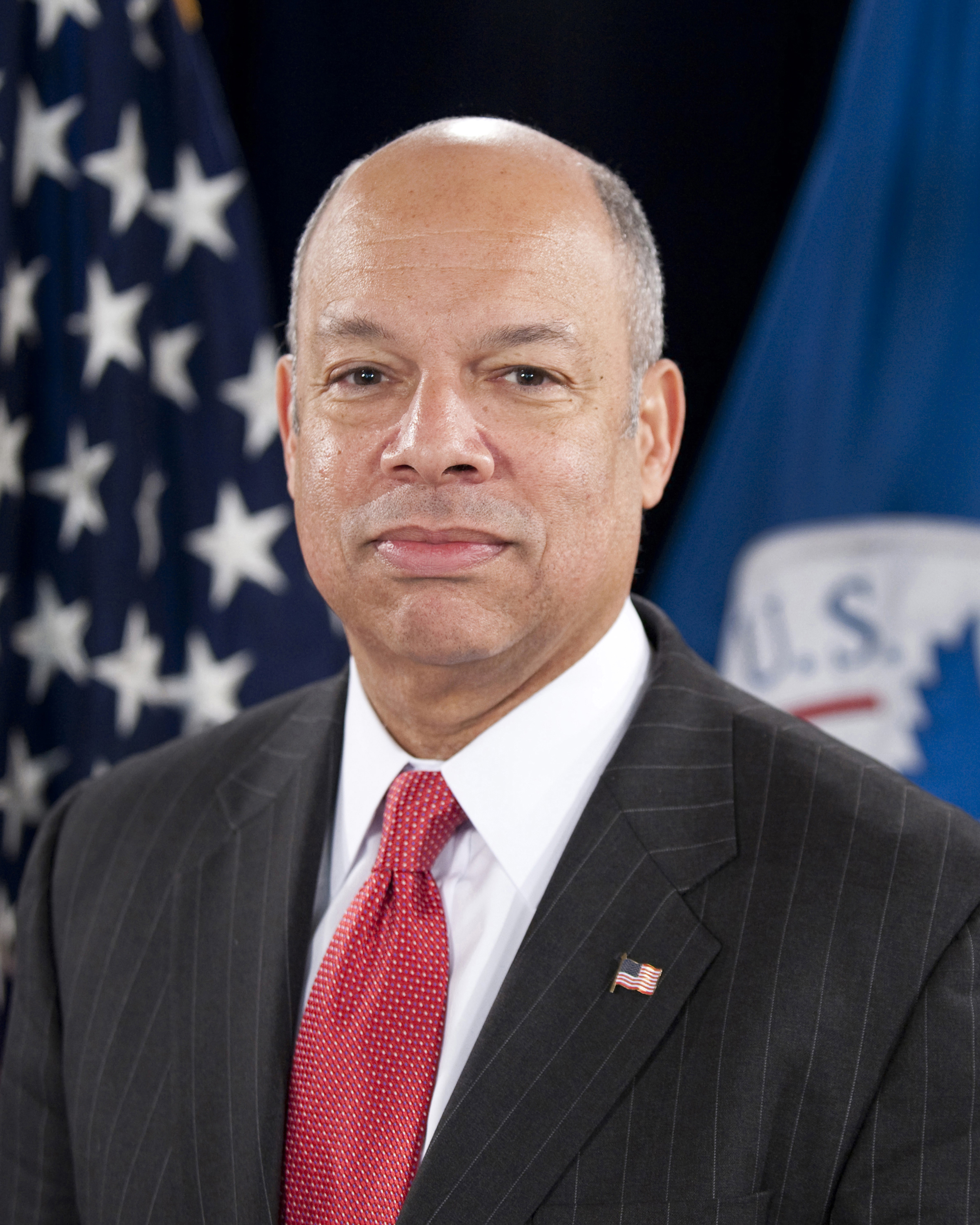
- Official portrait, 2014

4th United States Secretary of Homeland Security
- In office December 23, 2013 – January 20, 2017
- President: Barack Obama
- Deputy: Alejandro Mayorkas
- Preceded by: Janet Napolitano
- Succeeded by: John F. Kelly

General Counsel of the Department of Defense
- In office February 10, 2009 – December 31, 2012
- President: Barack Obama
- Preceded by: William J. Haynes II
- Succeeded by: Stephen W. Preston

General Counsel of the Air Force
- In office October 15, 1998 – January 20, 2001
- President: Bill Clinton
- Preceded by: Sheila C. Cheston
- Succeeded by: Mary L. Walker

Personal details
- Born: Jeh Charles Johnson; September 11, 1957 (age 69) New York City, New York, U.S.
- Party: Democratic
- Spouse: Susan DiMarco (m. 1994)
- Relatives: Jeh V. Johnson (father); Charles S. Johnson (grandfather)
- Education: Morehouse College (BA); Columbia University (JD)

Jeh Charles "Jay" Johnson (/ˈdʒeɪ/; born September 11, 1957) is an American lawyer and former government official who served as the 4th United States secretary of homeland security from 2013 to 2017.

From 2009 to 2012, Johnson was the general counsel of the Department of Defense during the first years of the Obama administration. Before joining the Obama administration, he was a federal prosecutor, the general counsel of the Department of the Air Force, and an attorney in private practice.

In June 2025, Johnson retired from Paul, Weiss, Rifkind, Wharton & Garrison, LLP, the law firm he had been affiliated with in private law practice off and on for over 40 years.

Johnson is currently co-chair of the board of trustees of Columbia University, a member of the board of directors of MetLife and the September 11 Memorial & Museum, and a former director or trustee of Lockheed Martin, U.S. Steel, PG&E, Adelphi University, and the Council on Foreign Relations. Johnson is also currently a semi-regular commentator on NBC's Meet The Press, MS NOW, CNN, Fox News, and other networks. He is also the author of numerous op-eds and essays. He is a frequent debater at the Oxford and Cambridge Unions in England, an honorary life member of the Cambridge Union, and the recipient of 13 honorary degrees.

== Early life and education ==
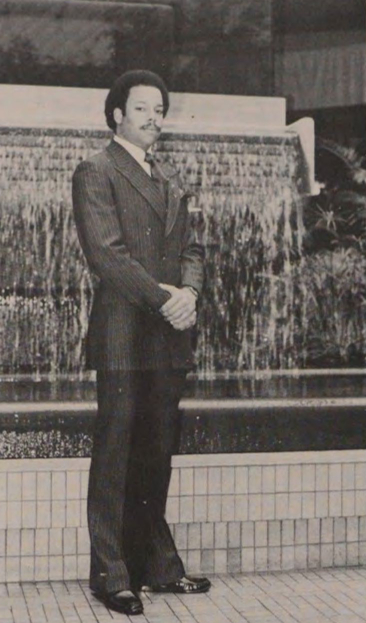
Johnson in the Morehouse College yearbook, 1979

Johnson was born on September 11, 1957, in New York City, the son of Norma (Edelin), who worked for Planned Parenthood, and Jeh Vincent Johnson, an architect and lecturer at Vassar College. Jeh and Norma met through his friendship with her brother Milton. He and Milton were the only black students in their respective classes at Columbia University's School of Architecture. Among other notable family members, Norma's brother Kenneth C. Edelin was a physician and a defendant in a landmark case involving abortion rights. Jeh Vincent Johnson's father was Charles S. Johnson, a sociologist and president of Fisk University. The first name Jeh was taken from a Liberian chief, who reportedly saved his grandfather's life during a League of Nations mission to Liberia in 1930.

Raised in Wappingers Falls, New York, Jeh Charles Johnson graduated from Roy C. Ketcham High School in 1975. He later described himself as "a big underachiever," earning Cs and Ds in school, which he attributed to the scarcity of "African-American role models" in his mostly white community. During his sophomore year in college, however, a vision of becoming an attorney, he said, finally inspired him to work to increase his "GPA above a dismal 1.8."

Johnson graduated from Morehouse College (B.A.) and Columbia Law School (J.D.).

== Early career ==
=== Private practice and federal prosecutor ===
Johnson began as an associate at Paul, Weiss, Rifkind, Wharton & Garrison in November 1984, then left in 1989 to serve as an assistant United States Attorney in the public corruption section at the Southern District of New York. There, he prosecuted politicians, police, and immigration agents.

Johnson returned to Paul, Weiss in 1992 and was elected partner (the first African-American partner at the firm) in 1994.

=== Air Force General Counsel ===
In 1998, Johnson was appointed General Counsel of the Air Force by President Bill Clinton and confirmed by the U.S. Senate. As General Counsel, Johnson was the senior legal official in the Air Force and the Governor of the Air Force-administered Wake Island. His tenure coincided with Operation Allied Force in 1999. He was awarded the Decoration for Exceptional Civilian Service for his efforts.

=== Private practice ===
After his service in the Clinton administration, Johnson returned to Paul, Weiss in 2001, where he tried large commercial cases. He is a fellow in the American College of Trial Lawyers.

Johnson was a member of the executive committee of the New York City Bar Association. From 2001 to 2004, he served as chairman of the City Bar's Judiciary Committee, which rates and approves all federal, state and local judges in New York City. In 2007, Johnson was shortlisted by the New York State Commission on Judicial Nomination to be Chief Judge of New York though the incumbent, Judith Kaye, was ultimately reappointed by former Governor Eliot Spitzer.

=== Involvement with the Democratic Party ===
Johnson was active in Democratic Party politics, as a fundraiser and adviser to presidential campaigns. Johnson served as special counsel to John Kerry's 2004 presidential campaign, and was an early supporter of Barack Obama's presidential campaign, active as a foreign policy adviser and as a member of his national finance committee.

== Obama administration ==
=== General Counsel of the Department of Defense ===
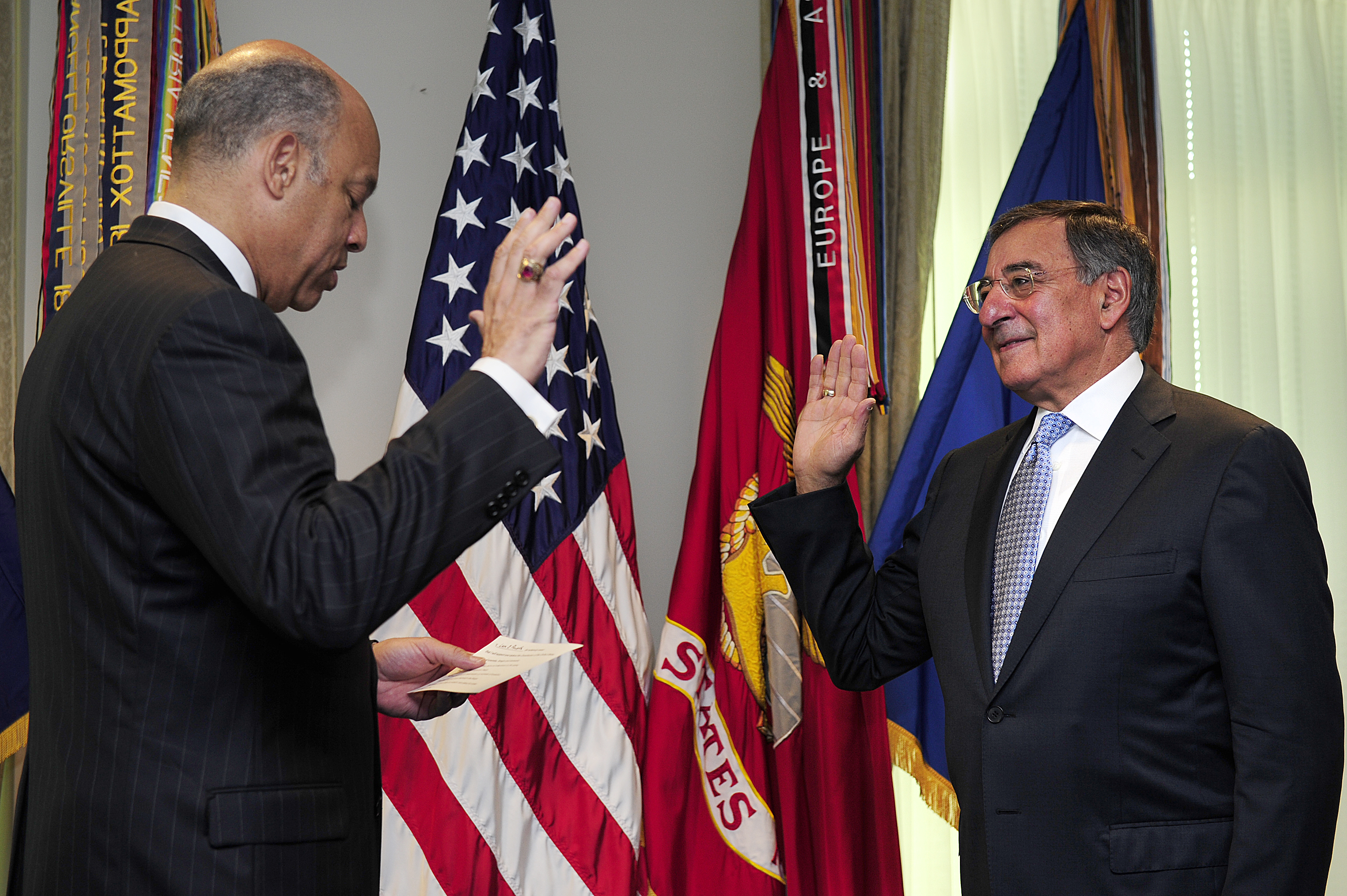
Johnson swears in Leon Panetta as Secretary of Defense.

On January 8, 2009, then President-elect Barack Obama announced Johnson's nomination as Department of Defense General Counsel. On February 9, 2009, he was confirmed by the Senate by a voice vote.

In 2009, Johnson was heavily involved in the reform of military commissions, and testified before Congress numerous times in support of the Military Commissions Act of 2009. In February 2010, the Secretary of Defense appointed Johnson to co-chair a working group, along with Army General Carter Ham, to study the potential impact of a repeal of the military's "Don't Ask, Don't Tell" policy. In November 2010, following an extensive study, Johnson and General Ham reported that the risk to overall military effectiveness of a repeal would be low.

As general counsel, Johnson gave a number of speeches on national security. In a speech delivered at The Heritage Foundation in October 2011, Johnson warned against "over-militarizing" the U.S. government's approach to counterterrorism: "There is risk in permitting and expecting the U.S. military to extend its powerful reach into areas traditionally reserved for civilian law enforcement in this country." At a speech at Yale Law School in February 2012, Johnson defended "targeted killings".

At the Oxford Union in November 2012, shortly before his resignation, Johnson delivered an address titled "The conflict against al Qaeda and its affiliates: how will it end?" In that speech, he predicted a "tipping point" at which the U.S. government's efforts against al Qaeda should no longer be considered an armed conflict, but a more traditional law enforcement effort against individual terrorists. Johnson stated:

"War" must be regarded as a finite, extraordinary and unnatural state of affairs. War permits one man—if he is a "privileged belligerent," consistent with the laws of war—to kill another. War violates the natural order of things, in which children bury their parents; in war parents bury their children. In its 12th year, we must not accept the current conflict, and all that it entails, as the "new normal." Peace must be regarded as the norm toward which the human race continually strives.

The Oxford Union speech received widespread press attention, and editorial acclaim as the first such statement coming from an Obama administration official.

According to published reports, Johnson personally authored the legal opinion that provided the basis for U.S. special operations forces to go into Pakistan to kill Osama bin Laden.

=== Secretary of Homeland Security ===
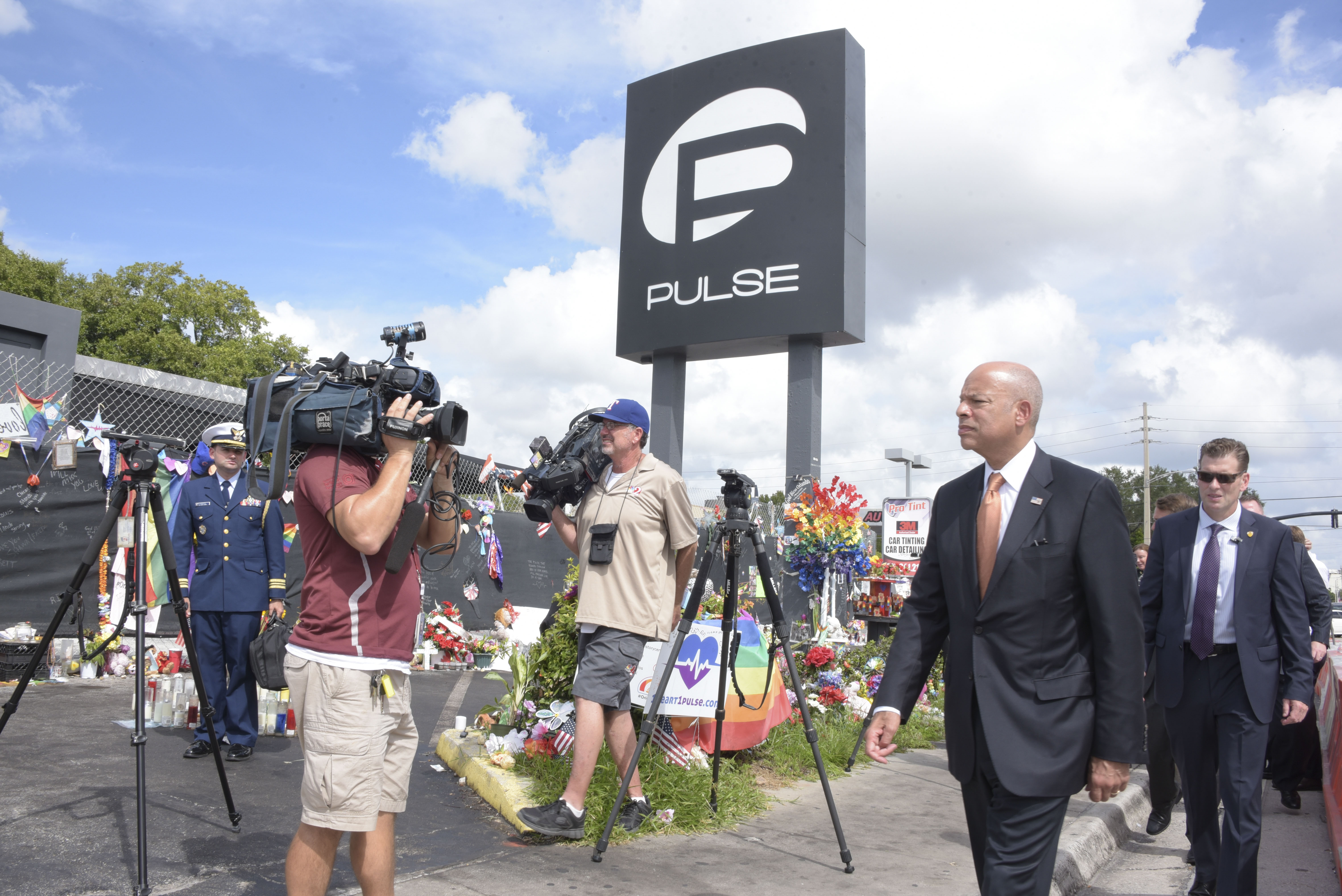
Johnson visits Pulse nightclub after shooting which left 49 people dead in Orlando

Johnson was nominated by President Barack Obama to be the fourth U.S. Secretary of Homeland Security in October 2013, and was subsequently confirmed by the United States Senate on December 16, 2013, by a 78–16 vote. He was sworn in on December 23, 2013.

When Johnson entered office one of his top priorities was to fill all of the high level vacancies. By April 2015 the President had appointed and the Senate confirmed all but one of Johnson's senior leader positions. One of Johnson's first major efforts as Secretary was his unity of effort initiative to set the conditions for the department to operate in a more unified fashion and develop a culture that recognizes and responds adequately to the diverse challenges the Department of Homeland Security faces.

In the spring and summer of 2014 the southern border of the United States experienced a large influx of immigrants, many of whom were children, coming from Central America. Secretary Johnson and his department worked with the Department of Health and Human Services to coordinate a response to address the immigrants' needs. In June, U.S. Citizenship and Immigrations Services asylum officers were reassigned to conduct credible fear interviews, while prioritizing the cases of recently apprehended unaccompanied children, adults with children, and other recent border crossers. At the same time, Secretary Johnson asked for the support of Congress to increase border security and prevent more spikes like this from happening again. After the flow of immigrant children to the United States, the Department of Homeland Security established three family residential centers, and they immediately became the focus of much controversy. The ACLU has compared them to Japanese internment camps and in July 2015 a U.S. District Court Judge in California ordered that the family residential centers comply with a 1997 settlement concerning the detention of children.

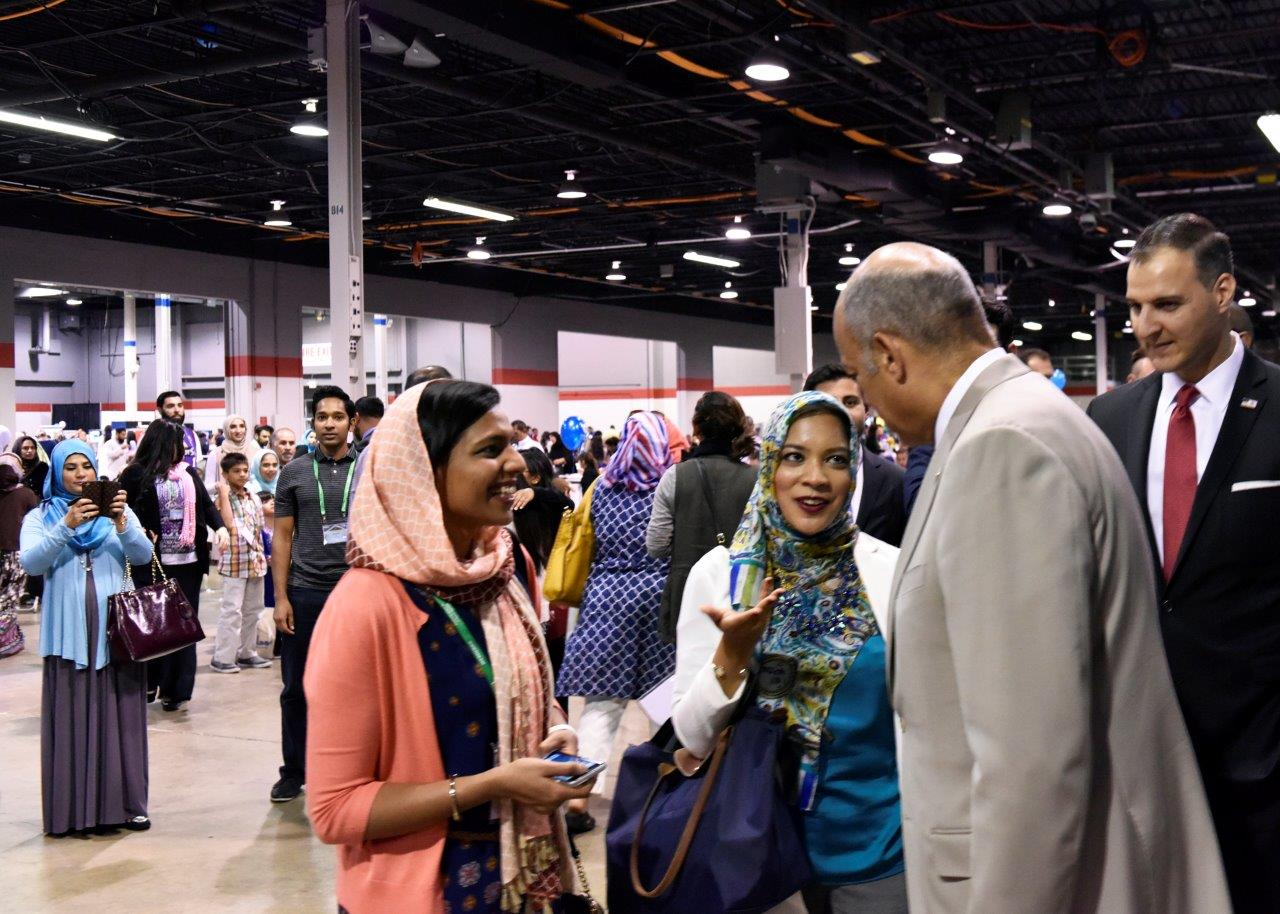
Johnson speaking at the Islamic Society of North America convention in Chicago in September 2016

During the summer and fall of 2014, Secretary Johnson oversaw the Department of Homeland Security's response to the ongoing Ebola crisis in West Africa. The Ebola epidemic was the largest in history, and impacted multiple West African countries. In response, the Department of Homeland Security developed policies, procedures and protocols to identify travelers for screening who could have been potentially infected to minimize the risk to the traveling public. This response was chosen by the department over limiting travel visas to the United States, which Secretary Johnson contended would have been a mistake given the leadership position of the U.S. and likelihood of influencing other countries to take the same action.

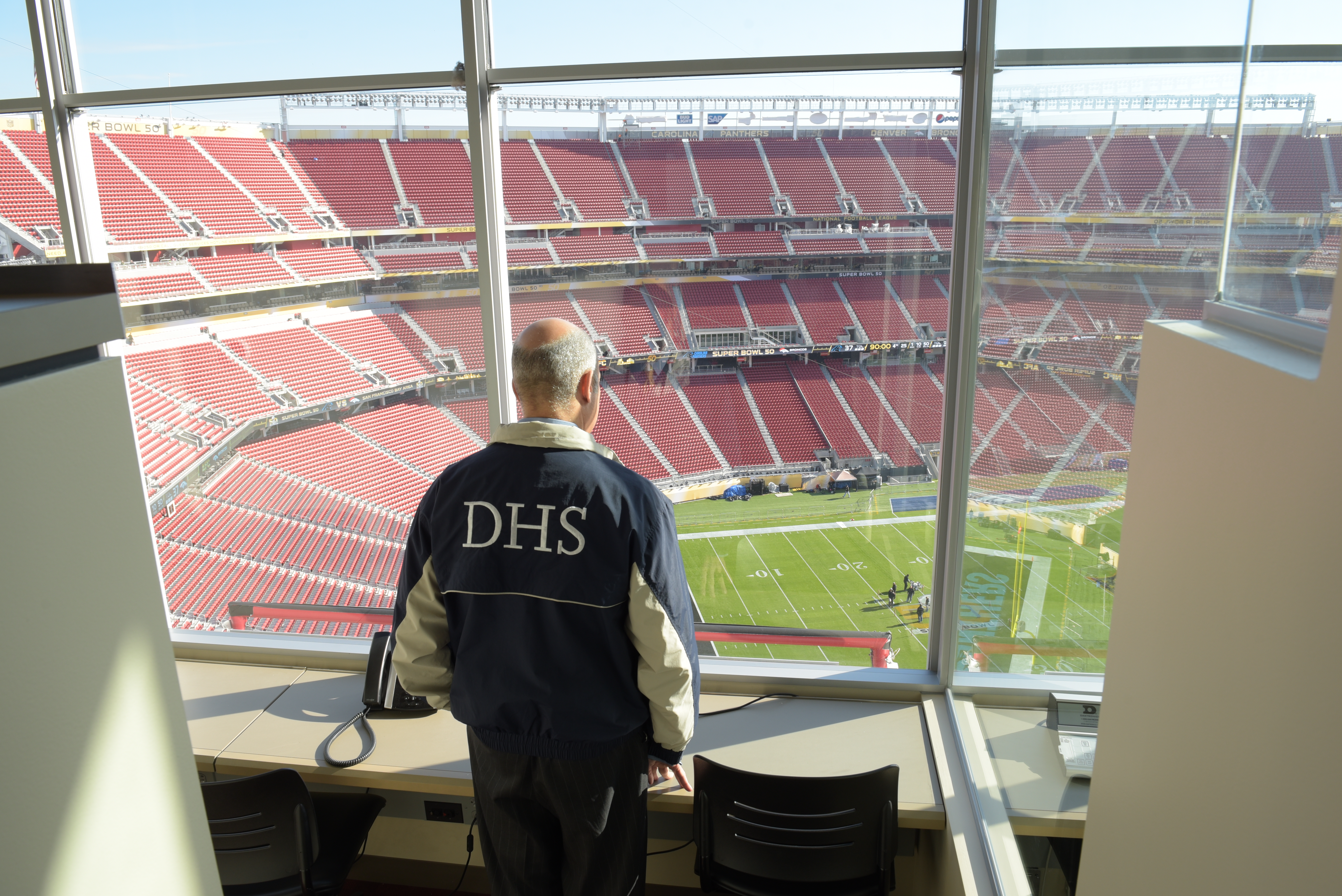
Johnson met with law enforcement officials and National Football League security prior to Super Bowl 50

After the House of Representatives failed to act on Bill S. 744, Secretary Johnson and President Obama issued ten new executive actions on November 20, 2014, to address the 11 million undocumented individuals in the United States. Johnson is said to have worked heavily on drafting the executive actions at the behest of the President.

== Career after Obama administration ==
For the inauguration of Donald Trump, Johnson was chosen as the designated survivor and would have become the next president if a disaster or attack had occurred.

After leaving office in January 2017, Johnson rejoined the law firm Paul, Weiss, Rifkind, Wharton & Garrison in New York City. He is also a member of the boards of directors of MetLife, the National September 11 Memorial & Museum, and co-chair of the board of trustees of Columbia University. He is also now a frequent commentator on NBC's Meet the Press, CBS, MS NOW, CNN, NewsNation and other networks, and the author of numerous op-eds in the New York Times, the Washington Post, the Wall Street Journal, and elsewhere. In July 2026, Johnson co-authored Presidential War Powers: Executive Expansion and Congressional Retreat in the Georgetown Journal of National Security Law and Policy, and in September 2026, he published Homeland Security 25 Years Later: Time to Rethink and Rebuild? in Lawfare. Johnson also hosts a radio show on FM public radio station WBGO, based in Newark, New Jersey, All Things Soul, that features classic R&B music and commentary and interviews.

In June 2018, he was an outspoken critic of the Trump administration's family separation practice at the border. Several days later, he wrote to criticize calls to abolish ICE. Johnson has called for a more civil dialogue from political leaders on both sides of the aisle. In December 2021, he co-authored with Leon Panetta, Jane Herman and Bill Bratton, a statement arguing against parole for Sirhan Sirhan, the convicted killer of Senator Robert F. Kennedy.

In December 2018, Secretary Johnson was the recipient of the Ronald Reagan Peace Through Strength Award, presented at the Reagan Presidential Library, for “contributing greatly to the defense of our nation” and “guiding us through turbulent times with courage and wisdom.” He has received numerous other awards and acknowledgments, including three Department of Defense medals for distinguished public service. In December 2021, Johnson was a recipient of The American Lawyer's Lifetime Achievement Award. In May 2022, Johnson was the recipient of the Ellis Island Medal of Honor.

Johnson also delivered the convocation address at Liberty University on September 11, 2020, in which he discussed the importance of morality in political leadership.

In April 2020, Governor Phil Murphy appointed Johnson to represent New Jersey in the seven-state regional working group to develop a plan for reopening the economy following the COVID-19 crisis.

In June 2020, Chief Judge of New York State Janet DiFiore, appointed Johnson as Special Advisor on Equal Justice in the courts. After a four-month review, Johnson issued a 100-page public report that contained a number of recommendations. In the report Johnson noted:

“[I]n one form or another, multiple interviewees from all perspectives still complain about an under-resourced, over-burdened New York State court system, the dehumanizing effect it has on litigants, and the disparate impact of all this on people of color. Housing, Family, Civil and Criminal courts of New York City, in particular, continue to be faced with extremely high volumes of cases, fewer resources to hear those cases and aging facilities. Over and over, we heard about the ‘dehumanizing’ and ‘demeaning cattle-call culture’ in these high-volume courts. At the same time, the overwhelming majority of civil and criminal litigants in the Housing, Family, Civil and Criminal courts in New York City are people of color. The sad picture that emerges is, in effect, a second-class system of justice for people of color in New York state.”

In August 2023, the president of the American Bar Association asked Johnson and former federal appellate judge J. Michael Luttig to lead a national task force to recommend ways to restore public trust in American democracy. In June 2023, the president of the New York State Bar Association asked Johnson to co-chair a task force to study the impact of the Supreme Court's decision in the Harvard and UNC cases on affirmative action. In 2020, Johnson was floated as a possible candidate for United States Secretary of Defense, United States Attorney General and Director of National Intelligence in the Biden administration. In February 2023, Johnson and his family history were profiled on PBS's Finding your Roots. In January 2024, Johnson was the recipient of the gold medal, the New York State Bar Association's “highest honor." In October 2024 he won a Lifetime Achievement Award from the National Law Journal.

== Personal life ==
On March 18, 1994, Johnson married Susan Maureen DiMarco, a dentist, at Corpus Christi Church of New York City. The pair had grown up across the street from one other in Wappingers Falls, New York. At the request of the Secretary of the Navy, Dr. DiMarco was the sponsor at the christening of the USS New Jersey, a Virginia-class submarine.

He has been a resident of Montclair, New Jersey.

Johnson was in New York City during the September 11 attacks, which coincided with his 44th birthday. He has frequently referred to the attacks in his speeches.

== See also ==
- List of African-American United States Cabinet members

Legal offices
Preceded by Sheila Cheston	General Counsel of the Air Force; 1998–1999	Succeeded by Mary Walker
Preceded by William Haynes	General Counsel of the Department of Defense; 2009–2012	Succeeded by Stephen Preston
Political offices
Preceded by Janet Napolitano	United States Secretary of Homeland Security; 2013–2017	Succeeded by John F. Kelly
U.S. order of precedence (ceremonial)
Preceded by Tom Perez as Former U.S. Cabinet Member	Order of precedence of the United States as Former U.S. Cabinet Member	Succeeded by Sylvia Mathews Burwell as Former U.S. Cabinet Member
