= Jeh V. Johnson =

American architect (1931–2021)

Jeh Vincent Johnson
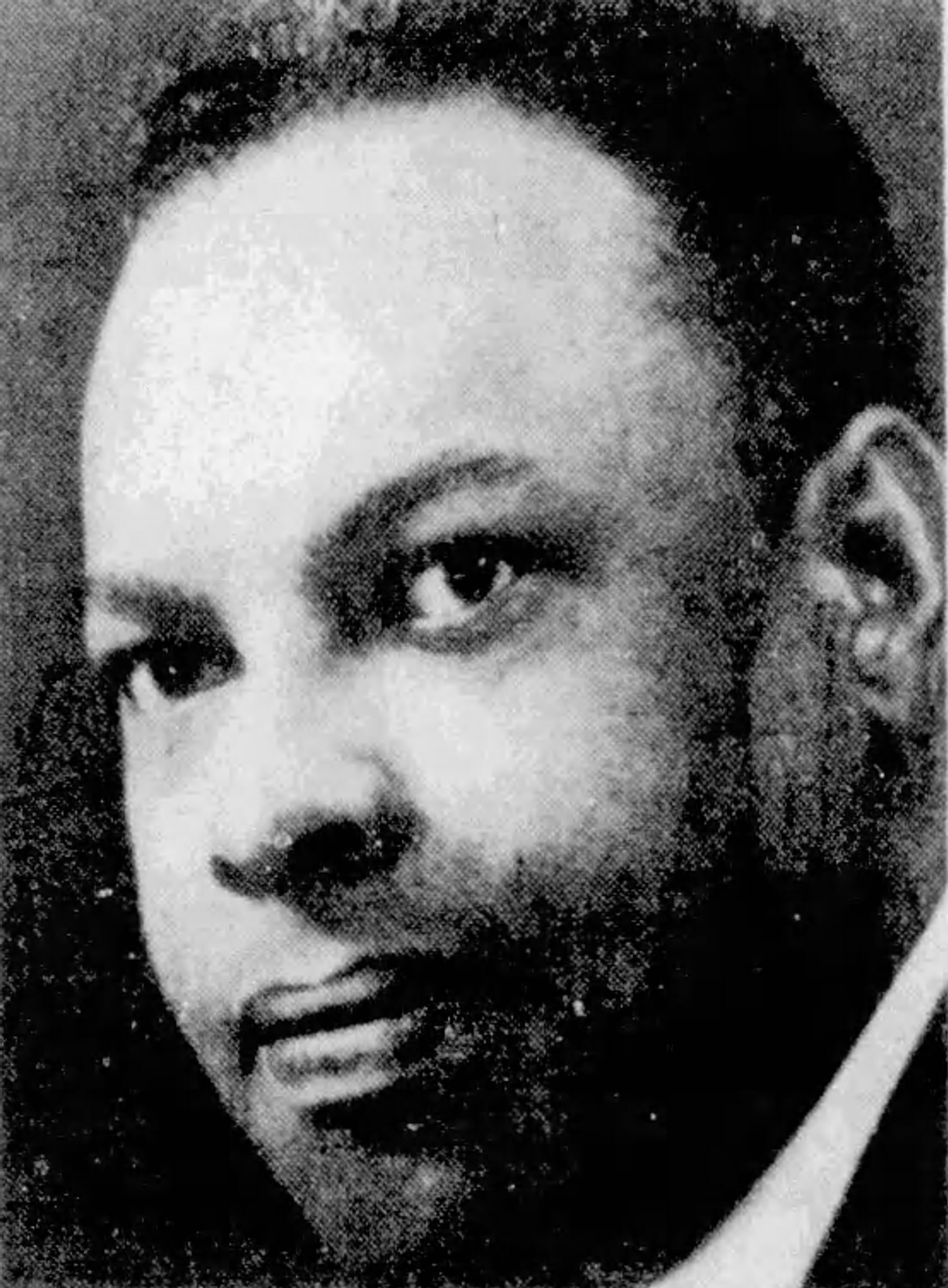
- Johnson c. 1977
- Born: July 8, 1931; Nashville, Tennessee, U.S.
- Died: January 27, 2021 (aged 89); Poughkeepsie, New York, U.S.
- Other names: Jeh–Vincent Johnson
- Education: Columbia University (BA, M.Arch.)
- Occupation(s): Architect, educator
- Known for: Co-founder of National Organization of Minority Architects
- Spouse: Norma Edelin
- Children: 2, including Jeh Charles Johnson
- Father: Charles Spurgeon Johnson
- Awards: AIA Fellow (1977)

Jeh Vincent Johnson, FAIA, NOMA (1931–2021) was an American architect and educator. He was an African American co-founder of the National Organization of Minority Architects (NOMA); and taught architectural design at Vassar College for many years. Johnson was a partner at the firms of Gindele & Johnson; and LeGendre, Johnson, McNeil Architects. His father is Charles Spurgeon Johnson, a sociologist and the 6th president of Fisk University in Nashville, Tennessee; and his son is Jeh Charles Johnson, the former United States Secretary of Homeland Security.

== Biography ==
=== Early life and education ===
Jeh Vincent Johnson was July 8, 1931, Nashville, Tennessee, to parents Marie Antoinette Burgette and Charles Spurgeon Johnson. He was named "Jeh" after Chief Twelly Jeh from Liberia, who reportedly saved his father's life while he was on a League of Nations mission to Liberia in 1930. Johnson attended St. Vincent de Paul Catholic School in Nashville, and was baptized Catholic as a child.

He attended Columbia College at Columbia University in New York City, where he received a B.A. degree in 1953; and continued his studies at Columbia Graduate School of Architecture, Planning and Preservation where he received a M.Arch. degree in 1958. He was the president of the student body at Columbia in 1956.

From 1953 until 1954, Johnson served in the United States Army in the Counterintelligence Corps.

=== Career ===
While still a student in 1956, Johnson worked under architect Paul R. Williams in New York City. After graduation from graduate school, he was awarded the William Kinne Fellows Fellowship and traveled to Europe. Followed by work from 1958 to 1962 as an architect at Adams & Woodbridge in New York City.

He moved to Poughkeepsie, New York in the Hudson Valley, and Johnson and William Gindele (1925–2020) co-founded in 1962 the architectural firm Gindele & Johnson, where Johnson remained until 1980. Johnson taught architectural design and drafting at Vassar College in Poughkeepsie, from 1964 to 2001. In his teachings, Johnson instilled the idea of social responsibilities in design.

In 1971, Johnson and eleven colleagues at the AIA national convention in Detroit formed an organization that eventually became the National Organization of Minority Architects (NOMA), in order to advance black architects. In 1977, Johnson was elected to the AIA’s College of Fellows. From 1980 until 1990, Johnson was a partner at LeGendre, Johnson, McNeil Architects.

In 1997, Johnson was awarded a special citation from the AIA New York chapter, for his advocacy on equal opportunity and housing issues.

=== Death ===
Johnson died at age 89 on January 27, 2021, at Vassar Brothers Hospital in Poughkeepsie, New York. His funeral was held at St. Vincent de Paul Catholic Church in Nashville and he was buried at Greenwood Cemetery.

== Personal life ==
He met his future wife Norma Edelin during their undergraduate studies. Together they married and had two children, including Jeh Charles Johnson (born 1957) the former United States Secretary of Homeland Security under President Barack Obama.

== Legacy ==
The ALANA Center at Vassar College was renamed after his death to be the Jeh Vincent Johnson ALANA Cultural Center, which he had designed.

== Works ==
- Susan Stein Shiva Theater (1977), Vassar College, Arlington, New York
- Catharine Street Center and Library (now Catharine St. Community Center), Poughkeepsie, New York
- ALANA Center (now Jeh Vincent Johnson ALANA Cultural Center), Vassar College, Poughkeepsie, New York

== See also ==
- African-American architects
- Fellow of the American Institute of Architects
