= Charles S. Johnson =

American sociologist and university administrator

- Johnson c. 1935–1945

6th President of Fisk University
- In office October 29, 1946 – October 27, 1956
- Preceded by: Thomas E. Jones
- Succeeded by: Stephen J. Wright

Personal details
- Born: Charles Spurgeon Johnson; July 24, 1893 Bristol, Virginia, U.S.
- Died: October 27, 1956 (aged 63) Louisville, Kentucky, U.S.
- Spouse: Marie Antoinette Burgette (m. 1920)
- Children: 4, including Jeh V. Johnson
- Relatives: Jeh Johnson (grandson)
- Education: Virginia Union University (B.A.); University of Chicago (Ph.D.)
- Occupation: Sociologist
- Known for: Civil Rights activism

Military service
- Allegiance: United States
- Branch/service: United States Army
- Battles/wars: World War I; Western Front

Charles Spurgeon Johnson (July 24, 1893 – October 27, 1956) was an American sociologist and college administrator, the first black president of historically black Fisk University, and a lifelong advocate for racial equality and the advancement of civil rights for African Americans and all ethnic minorities. He preferred to work collaboratively with liberal white groups in the South, quietly as a "sideline activist," to get practical results.

His position is often contrasted with that of W. E. B. Du Bois, who was a powerful and militant advocate for blacks and described Johnson as "too conservative." During Johnson's academic studies and leadership of Fisk University during the 1930s and 1940s, the South had legal racial segregation and Jim Crow discriminatory laws and practices, including having disfranchised most black voters in constitutions passed at the turn of the century. Johnson was unwavering in personal terms in his opposition to this oppressive system, yet he worked hard to change race relations in terms of short-term practical gains.

His son Jeh V. Johnson (1931–2021) was a noted architect. His grandson Jeh Johnson served as the United States Secretary of Homeland Security from 2013 to 2017.

== Early life and education ==
Johnson was born in 1893 in Bristol, Virginia, to well-educated parents. His father was a respected Baptist minister, and his mother was educated in public school. His father was born into slavery but emancipated.

He attended a boarding school in Richmond, Virginia, then earned a B.A. in sociology from Virginia Union University. Afterward, he began graduate study of sociology at the University of Chicago, though his study was interrupted by service in France during World War I as a non-commissioned officer with the U.S. Army. After returning to the US, he resumed graduate work at the University of Chicago, where he earned his Ph.D. in sociology and formed a friendship with Robert E. Park, who had a strong influence on his work. When he was appointed director of research and investigation of the National Urban League, Johnson and his wife moved to New York City.

== Career ==
After the race riot of 1919, when blacks fought back against white attacks as part of the urban violence in numerous cities during Red Summer, Johnson worked as a researcher for the National Urban League and in 1921, he became the League's research director. During his time with the National Urban League, he also founded the magazine Opportunity as an outlet for black expression in the arts. He was a principal researcher and author for the Chicago Commission on Race Relations for its report on the riot. Newspapers of the period had reported that the instigators were largely ethnic Irish trying to maintain economic and social dominance over blacks in South Chicago; Johnson noted that African Americans had rebelled against the denial of economic and social opportunity. His work was fundamental to the commission's report, The Negro in Chicago: A Study of Race Relations and a Race Riot (1922), published by the University of Chicago Press. It was considered a classic model for comprehensive commission reports.

In the 1920s Johnson moved to New York City, where he became research director for the National Urban League. He was an "entrepreneur of the Harlem Renaissance," the creative movement by African-American writers and artists of that time. He edited two journals that published many writers of the period, and established prizes at the National Urban League to recognize young writers. In Harlem, he argued for black artists saying that they must use their own experiences as the basis for their creativity, rejecting European standards. His goal was to improve Negro self-image and character, and he felt that by writing they could achieve this.

=== Return to the South ===
Johnson yearned to return to the South, not only to study race relations but to change them. In 1926 he moved to Nashville, taking a position as chair of the Department of Sociology at Fisk University, a historically black college. There he wrote or directed numerous studies of how combined legal, economic and social factors produced an oppressive racial structure. Two of his works have become classics: Shadow of the Plantation (1934), and Growing up in the Black Belt (1940).

In 1929 an American missionary in Liberia reported that Liberian officials were using soldiers to gather tribal people who were shipped to the island of Fernando Po as forced laborers. The Liberian government denied the charges and invited a League of Nations commission of inquiry. Cuthbert Christy of Britain headed the commission. Johnson was the United States representative. The former President of Liberia Arthur Barclay represented his country. The commission began work on April 8, 1930. The result of the inquiries was an outspoken report submitted in September 1930. It found that the laborers had been recruited "under condition of criminal compulsion scarcely distinguishable from slave raiding and slave trading." As a result of the Christy report, President Charles D. B. King and Vice-president Allen N. Yancy both resigned.

In 1928, Johnson became the chairman of Fisk University’s Department of Sociology. In 1930 he received a Rosenwald fellowship to further his sociological research, which lead to the book In the Shadow of the Plantation, published in 1934.

In 1930 Johnson was awarded the Harmon Prize for Science, for his work The Negro in American Civilization. During World War II, Johnson examined urban race relations at a moment when whites fought to preserve their power and privilege, especially in education, employment, and housing. One of his more important works in this period was a 98-page study of San Francisco's African American community that highlighted the institutional racism throughout the city and how African Americans, often recent migrants from the south, build their communities in places like Hunters Point and the Fillmore District.

In 1934 he was elected the first African-American trustee of the Julius Rosenwald Fund and was part of the committee to select Rosenwald Fellowship recipients.

Although he was not a formal member of the research team and did not participate in the 1953 meeting, he advised Thurgood Marshall in preparing the second brief. His book, The Negro in American Civilization (1930) was cited three times in Part I of the NAACP brief.

In 1946 Johnson was appointed as the first black president of Fisk University. He attracted outstanding faculty, including the author Arna Bontemps, Aaron Douglas and others. In 1946, Johnson was one of 20 American educators selected to advise on educational reform in occupied Japan. He was also a consultant for several White House conferences related to youth in American society, and a member of the first Board of Foreign Scholarships for the Fulbright Program.

Johnson lived to celebrate the landmark Supreme Court decision Brown v. Board of Education (1954), which ruled that racial segregation in the public schools was unconstitutional. Although he was not a formal member of the research team he advised Thurgood Marshall in preparing the second brief. His book, The Negro in American Civilization (1930) was cited three times in Part I of the NAACP brief.He played a key role in the effort to implement the decision in the face of "massive resistance" in the South. His work and that of his peers also contributed to passage of federal civil rights legislation of the mid-1960s.

He was a member of Alpha Phi Alpha fraternity. He was also a charter member of the Zeta Rho chapter of Phi Mu Alpha Sinfonia music fraternity, chartered at Fisk in 1953.

== Personal life ==
On November 6, 1920, Johnson married Marie Antoinette Burgette. They had three sons and one daughter. His son Jeh V. Johnson (1931–2021) was a noted architect. His grandson Jeh Johnson served as the United States Secretary of Homeland Security from 2013 to 2017.

Johnson died unexpectedly in 1956. He was traveling by train from Nashville to New York when he had a heart attack on the platform at a stop in Louisville, Kentucky. He was 63 years old.

== Notable works ==
- Editor, Opportunity: A Journal of Negro Life, the official publication of the National Urban League
- Editor, Ebony and Topaz, 1928

Johnson's academic works include:

- The Negro in American Civilization; A Study of Negro Life and Race Relations in the Light of Social Research, New York: Henry Holt, 1930.
- Bitter Canaan: The Story of the Negro Republic, Routledge, 2022.
- The Collapse of Cotton Tenancy. Summary of Field Studies & Statistical Surveys, 1933–35, with Edwin R. Embree [and] W. W. Alexander. Chapel Hill: University of North Carolina Press, 1935.
- The Negro War Worker in San Francisco, A Local Self Study 1944.
- Shadow of the Plantation Chicago: University of Chicago Press, c. 1934/reprinted 1966.
- Growing Up in the Black Belt; Negro Youth in the Rural South. With an introduction by St. Clair Drake. Prepared for the American Youth Commission, American Council on Education, c. 1941; reprinted NY: Schocken Books, 1967.
- "The Negro Renaissance and Its Significance" (1954), reprinted in Remembering the Harlem Renaissance, Ed. Cary D. Wintz. New York: Garland, 1996, pp. 226–34.
- The Negro College Graduate NY: Negro Universities Press, 1969.
- Education and the Cultural Process; papers presented at symposium commemorating the seventy-fifth anniversary of the founding of Fisk University, April 29–May 4, 1941. Edited by Charles S. Johnson. NY: Negro Universities Press, 1970. LC2717 E36
