= Tony Gallegos =

American businessman, World War II veteran and politician

Tony E. Gallegos
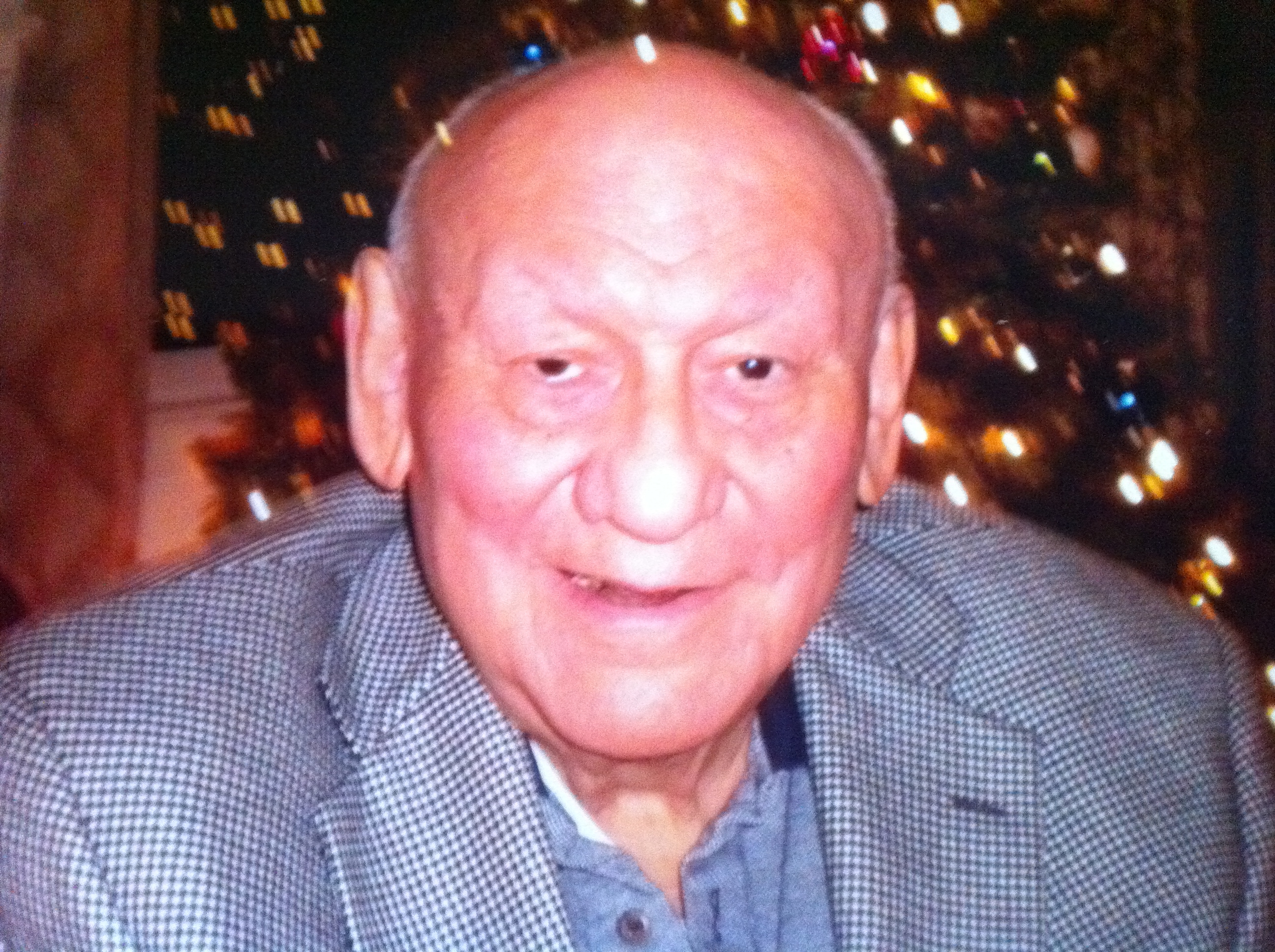

Chair of the Equal Employment Opportunity Commission
- Acting
- In office April 5, 1993 – 1994
- President: Bill Clinton
- Preceded by: Evan J. Kemp Jr.
- Succeeded by: Gilbert F. Casellas

Tony Gallegos (1924 – May 9, 2018) was an American businessman, World War II veteran and politician of Mexican American and Native American descent. Gallegos served in the U.S. Army Air Force, from 1943 to 1946. A native of Montrose, Colorado (born February 13, 1924), he served as a flight engineer in the U.S. Army Air Corps during World War II, flying 17 missions in a B-17 bomber. After the war, he received a bachelor of arts from the Bistram Institute of Fine Arts (B.A., 1952) in California. Prior to his appointment as a Commissioner of the U.S. Equal Employment Opportunity Commission, Gallegos worked at the Douglas Aircraft Company in California in a number of managerial positions from 1952 to 1982, and became corporate art director.

On February 4, 1982 President Ronald Reagan nominated Gallegos to be a Commissioner on the Equal Employment Opportunity Commission (EEOC) for a term to expire July 1, 1984. President Reagan renominated Tony for a follow-on term on the EEOC to expire July 1, 1989. On November 21, 1989, President George H. W. Bush announced his intention (reappointment) to nominate Tony E. Gallegos to be a member of the Equal Employment Opportunity Commission for the term expiring July 1, 1994. When on April 5, 1993 President Bill Clinton designated Commissioner Gallegos as Acting Chairman of the EEOC, he became the Commission's first Hispanic leader to serve in this capacity.

Gallegos died on May 9, 2018.

== See also ==
- American G.I. Forum http://www.eeoc.gov/policy/docs/eeoc-nlrb-ada.html
