= Eshelman (surname) =

The surname Eshelman may refer to:

- Cheston Lee Eshelman (1917–2004), American inventor, aviator, manufacturer of aircraft, boats, garden machinery and small automobiles
- Dave Eshelman (born 1948), American jazz trombonist, composer, arranger, band-leader and music-educator
- Tom Eshelman (born 1994), American baseball player
- Vaughn Eshelman (1969–2018), American baseball player
- William Robert Eshelman (1921–2004), American pacifist, editor, and librarian.
