= Sheila C. Cheston =

American lawyer

Sheila Carol Cheston (born November 5, 1958, in Washington, D.C.) is a United States lawyer who was General Counsel of the Air Force from March 1995 to October 1998.

== Biography ==
Cheston was educated at Dartmouth College, receiving a B.A. in June 1980, and Columbia Law School, receiving a J.D. in May 1984.

From August 1984 through August 1985, she served as a law clerk for Judge W. A. Norris at the United States Court of Appeals for the Ninth Circuit.

From April 1994 through September 1994, Cheston was Special Associate Counsel to President of the United States Bill Clinton. She was General Counsel of the Air Force from March 1995 to October 1998.

Upon leaving government service, Cheston became a partner at Wilmer Cutler Pickering Hale and Dorr, where she chaired the firm's international aviation, defense, and aerospace group. In 2003, she became general counsel of BAE Systems, a position she held until 2009, when she became Executive Vice President. She moved to rival Northrop Grumman in June 2010, becoming Northrop Grumman's general counsel. She departed Northrop Grumman in 2023.

Government offices
| Preceded by Gilbert F. Casellas | General Counsel of the Air Force; March 1995 – October 1998 | Succeeded by Jeh Johnson |
