= Cushman (company) =

American vehicle manufacturing company

Coordinates: 40.8218833°N 96.6913428°W

- Formerly: Cushman Motor Works
- Type: Subsidiary
- Industry: Vehicles
- Founded: 1903; 123 years ago
- Founder: Everett and Clinton Cushman
- Headquarters: United States
- Products: Motor scooters Industrial vehicles
- Parent: Textron
- Website: cushman.txtsv.com

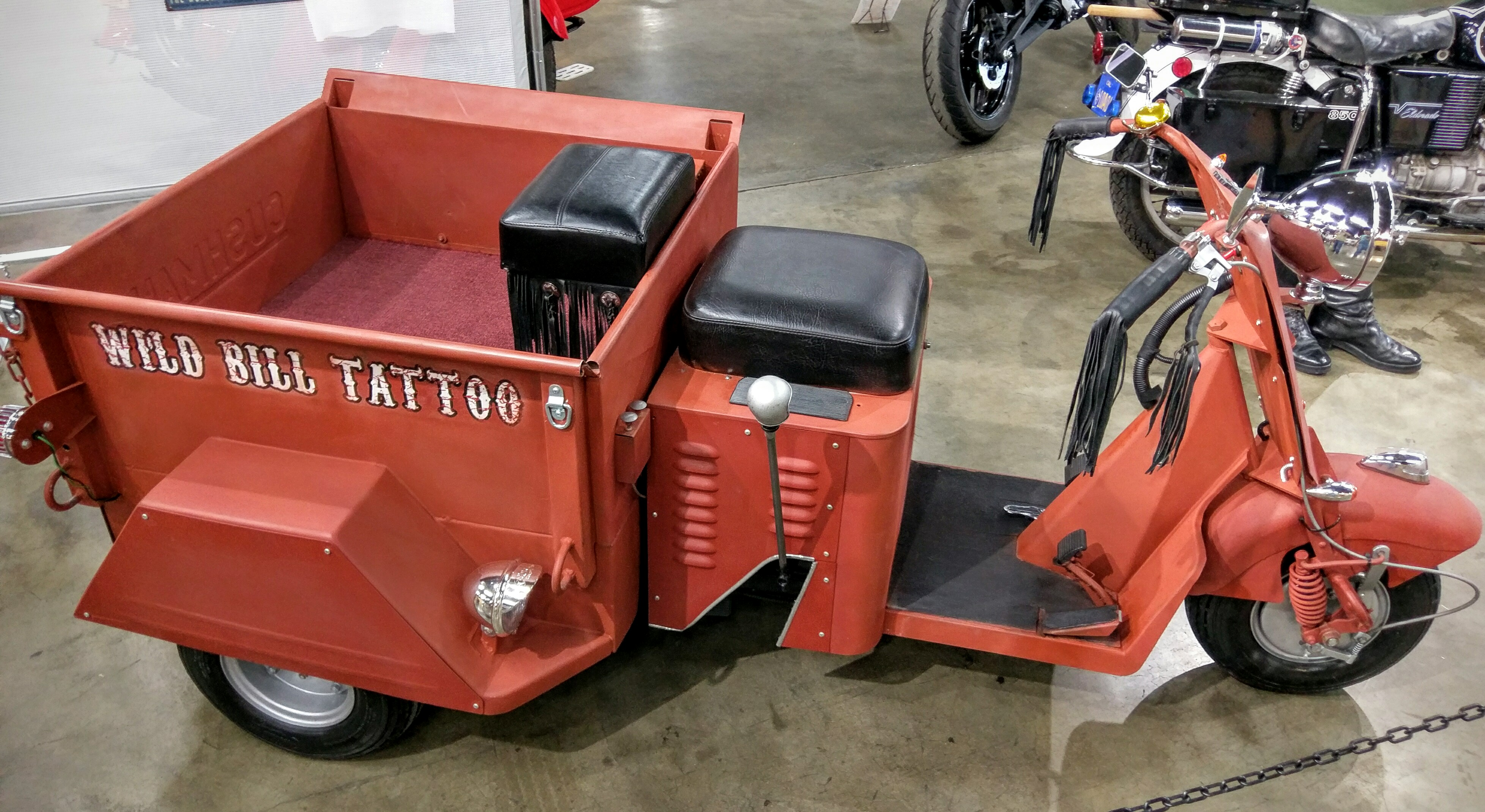
1954 Cushman Truckster Model 782 on display at the California Automobile Museum

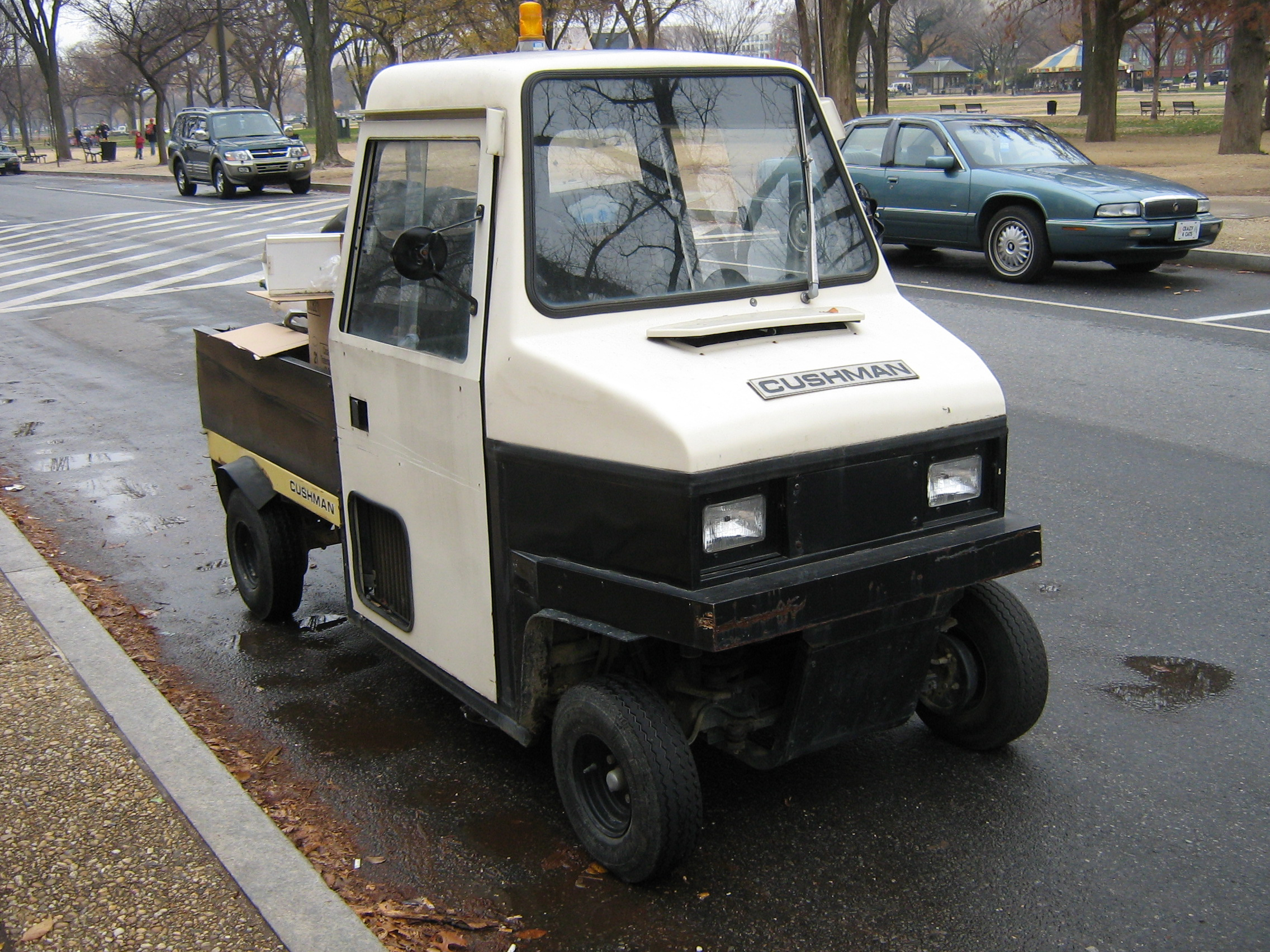
Cushman Truckster

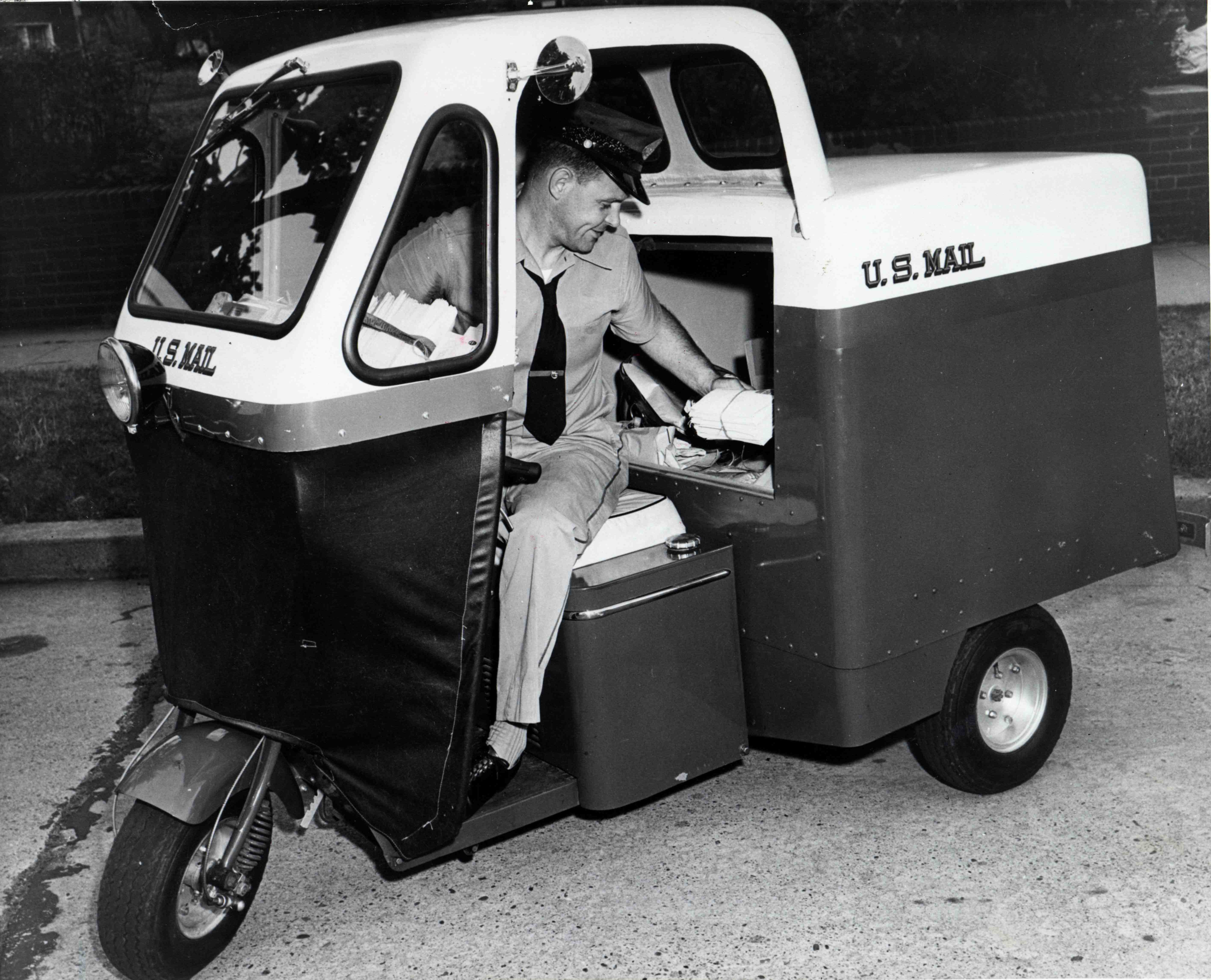
Cushman Mailster, 1955

Cushman is a manufacturer of industrial, personal, and custom vehicles. It is based in Augusta, Georgia, United States, and is owned by Textron. They also made a tracked fiber-glass bodied two stroke powered off-road vehicle from 1970 to 1975.

== History ==
The Cushman scooter company started in 1903 in Lincoln, Nebraska, by Everett and Clinton Cushman. The company incorporated as Cushman Motor Works in 1913. Cushman began production of their four-stroke Husky engine in 1922.

Cushman produced engines for farm equipment, pumps, lawn mowers, and boats. Cushman began making Auto-Glide scooters in 1936 as a means to increase the sale of Husky engines during the Great Depression. Cushman scooters were widely used by the United States Armed Forces in World War II and as an alternative to automobiles before and after the war.

One famous Cushman was the model 53, a military model from the World War II era. Designed to be dropped by parachute with Army Airborne troops, it became known as the Cushman Airborne. Other models were used on military bases for messenger service. The most successful model of Cushman scooter, the Eagle, was in production for approximately 16 years. It resembled a motorcycle with its exposed engine and top tank. Other Cushman models, like the post-war "turtle back" Models 50 and 60, or the economy Highlander, used a step-through design common for scooters. The step-through design and ease of operation made it popular with men and women alike.

Some late-1950s Cushmans, designated Road King and Pacemaker, had "jet-age" body styling. Sears sold a version of these models under the Allstate brand. Cushman scooters featured an automatic centrifugal clutch, which allowed the rider to twist the right grip to accelerate. Oddly, the throttle twisted forward during acceleration, opposite the usual pattern in most other motorcycles and scooters. Cushman claimed 75 mpg_{‑US} (3.1 L/100 km; 90 mpg_{‑imp}), and advertised penny-a-mile operating cost. Cushman scooters usually weighed about 250 lb (110 kg) to 335 lb (152 kg) and had as much as 9 horsepower (6.7 kW). In comparison to European scooters, Cushman scooters had a higher weight, larger cubic capacity (up to 0.4 L), but not more power.

In 1958, 15,000 Scooters were produced by Cushman. Scooter production ended in 1965, but some remaining Eagles were sold as 1966 models. After scooter production ceased, Cushman manufactured golf carts, industrial vehicles, and turf maintenance equipment. In Belgium there was a licence-production of Cushmann scooters under the label Belgian Cushman.

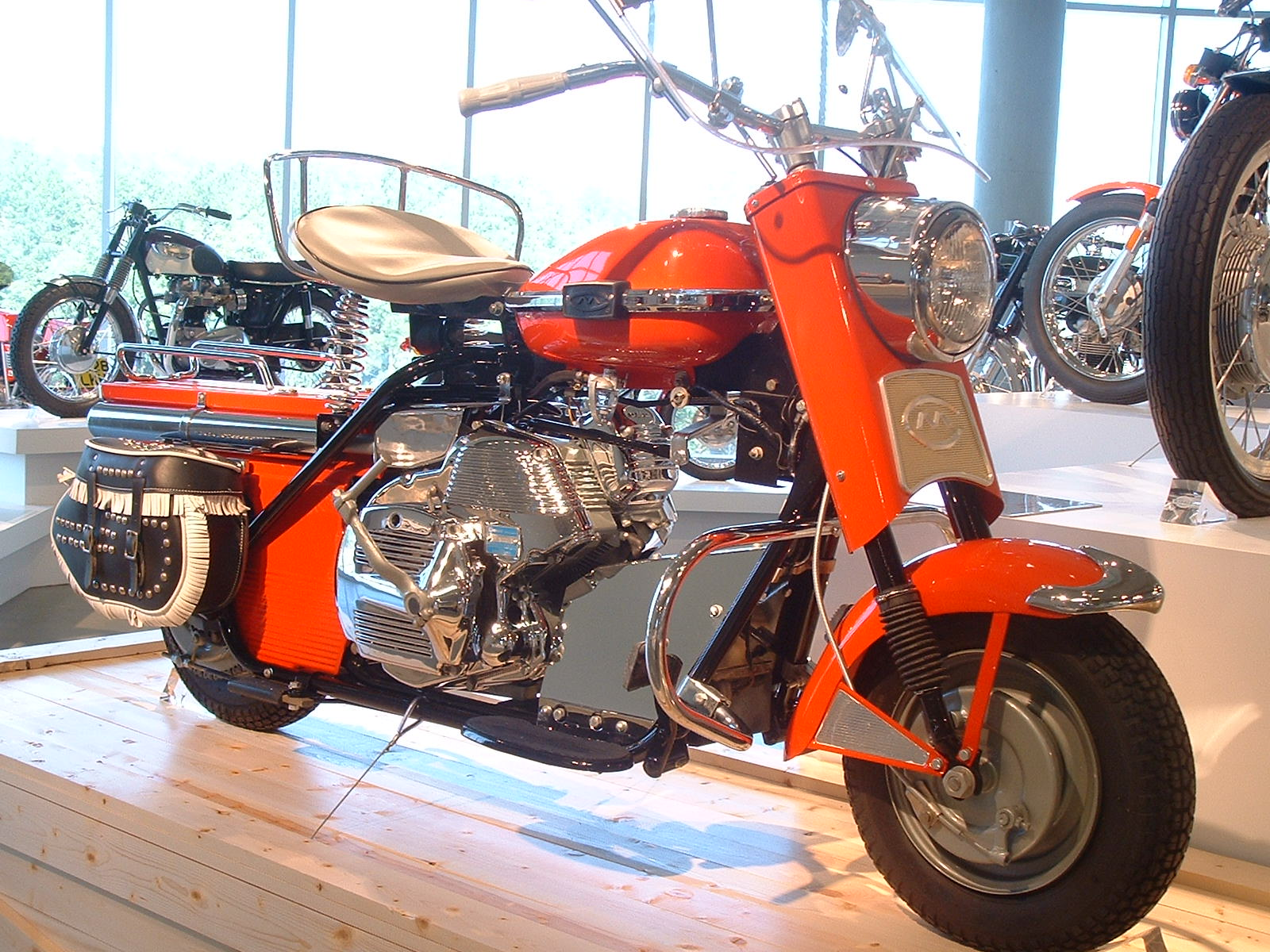
Cushman motor scooter

Cushman Trucksters were produced from 1952 to 2002. Small and light duty, they have been used for ice cream sales, mall and stadium maintenance, and by NYPD. Cushman became a division of the Outboard Marine Corporation in 1962. Ransomes (of Great Britain) purchased Cushman in 1989, and then Textron purchased Ransomes.

== Models ==
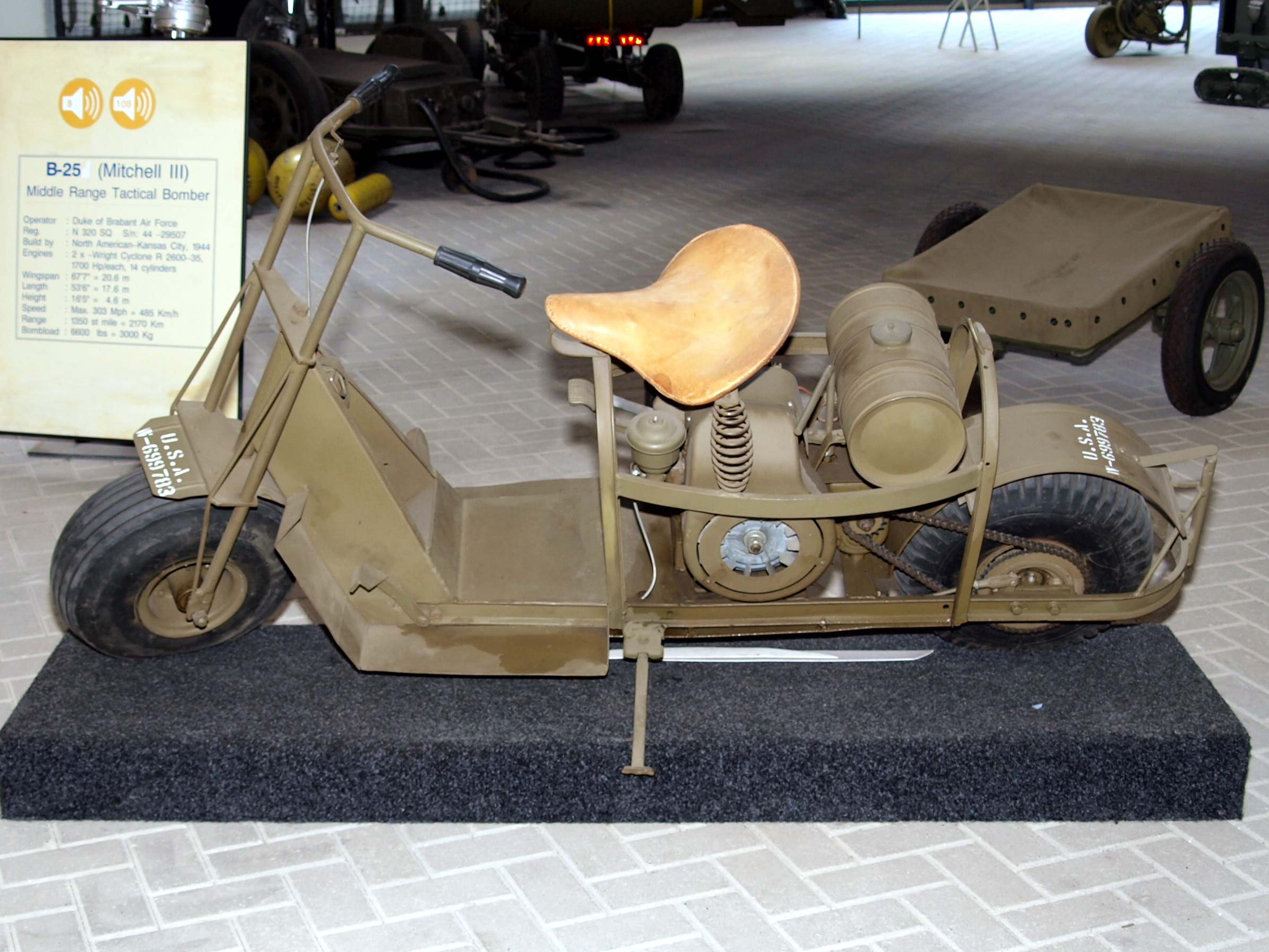
World War II Cushman Model 53 "Airborne"

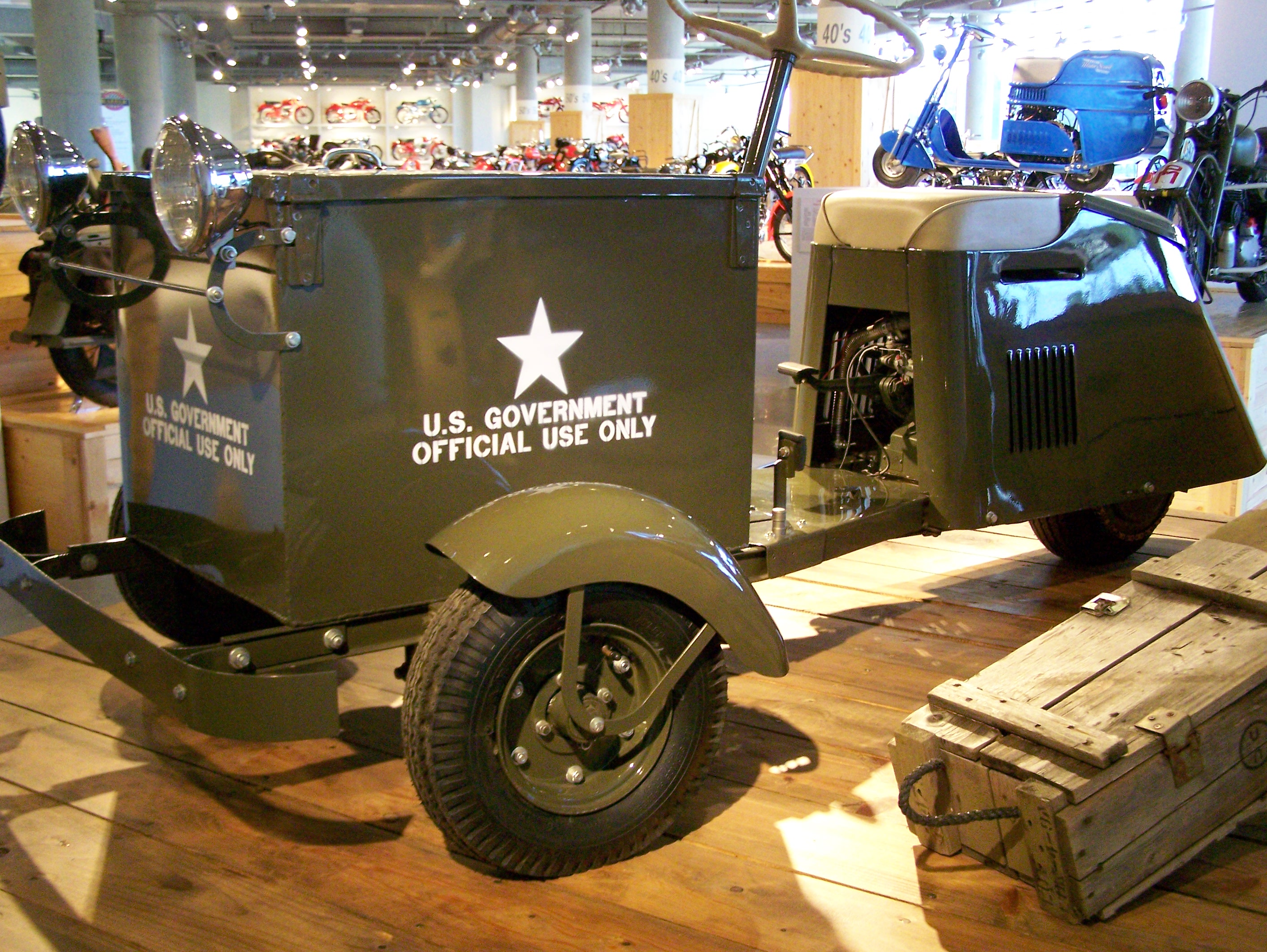
3-wheel US government Cushman

- AutoGlide - Models 1-2 (1936)
- AutoGlide - Models 1-3 (1937)
- AutoGlide - Models 1–3, R-1, 5–7, 5T-7T (1938–1939)
- AutoGlide - Models 12, 14, 21, 22, 24, 29 (1940–1941)
- 30 Series - Model 32 (1942–1945)
- 30 Series - Model 34 (1942–1945) G679 - motor scooter, with side car, 3-wheel
- 30 Series - Model 39 (1942–1945) G551 or G672 - motor scooter, package delivery 3-wheel
- 50 Series - Model 52 (1946–1948)
- 50 Series - Model 52A (1946–1948)
- 50 Series - Model 53 (1944) G683 - motor scooter, airborne 2-wheel
- 50 Series - Model 53A (1946–1948) Civilian Airborne
- 50 Series - Model 54 (1946–1948)
- 50 Series - Model 59 (1946–1948)
- 60 Series - Model 62 (1949–1956)
- 60 Series - Model 62A (1949–1956)
- 60 Series - Model 64 (1949–1956)
- 60 Series - Model 64A (1949–1956)
- 60 Series - Model 69 (1949–1956)
- 710 Highlander - Model 61 (1949)
- 711 Highlander (1950–1957)
- 714 Highlander (1952–1957)
- 715 Deluxe (1953–1957)
- 721 Highlander (1958)
- 721 Highlander (1959–1964)
- Allstate - Model 811:30 (1950–1957)
- Allstate - Model 811:40 (1950–1957)
- Allstate - Jetsweep (1958–1960)
- Allstate - Standard Model (1959–1961)
- 720 Series - Model 722 (1957–1959)
- 720 Series - Model 722 (1960–1962)
- 720 Series - Model 725 (1957–1959)
- 720 Series - Model 725 (1960–1962)
- The Eagle
- Haulster, small industrial multi-purpose truck
- Truckster
- Bellhop Series, golf carts
- Tug, large truck
- Minute Miser, truck
- Titan, larger industrial multi-purpose truck
- Model C, or "binder" engine, patented in 1911, came as a 4 HP single cylinder as well as 8 HP, 15 HP, and 20 HP twin cylinder models. Commonly known for driving grain binders for harvesting crops like oats, wheat, or barley.
- Trackster, track-based ATV
- Golfster, golf cart 3-wheel & 4-wheel
- motor scooter, with side car, 3-wheel, model 34 (G679)
- The Trailster offroad model
- Westcoaster Mailster, used by the United States Postal Service
- Jacobsen models made by Cushman
- White Truck

== See also ==
- G-numbers
