= Eshelman FW-5 =

General information
- Type: Experimental cabin monoplane
- National origin: United States
- Manufacturer: Cheston L. Eshelman Company
- Designer: Cheston Lee Eshelman
- Number built: 2

History
- First flight: 1942

The Eshelman FW-5 was a 1940s American experimental cabin monoplane designed and built at Dundalk, Maryland by the Cheston L. Eshelman Company.

== Design and development ==
The FW-5 was a cantilever low-wing monoplane, it had an unusual wing planform in which the wing centre-section was blended into the fuselage, this gave rise to the name The Wing. It had a fixed tailwheel landing gear and was powered by a 325 hp (242 kW) Avco Lycoming flat-six piston engine. The enclosed cabin had room for a pilot and three passengers. First flown in 1942 only two aircraft were built.

== Specifications ==
Data from The Illustrated Encyclopedia of Aircraft

General characteristics

- Crew: 1
- Capacity: 3 passengers
- Length: 23 ft 0 in (7.01 m)
- Wingspan: 30 ft 0 in (9.14 m)
- Height: 7 ft 7 in (2.31 m)
- Wing area: 232 sq ft (21.55 m^{2})
- Empty weight: 1,507 lb (684 kg)
- Gross weight: 2,650 lb (1,202 kg)
- Powerplant: 1 × Avco Lycoming flat-six piston engine , 325 hp (242 kW)

Performance

- Maximum speed: 180 mph (290 km/h, 160 kn)
- Range: 700 mi (1,127 km, 610 nmi)
- Service ceiling: 18,000 ft (5,485 m)
