= Westcoaster Mailster =

Postal vehicle

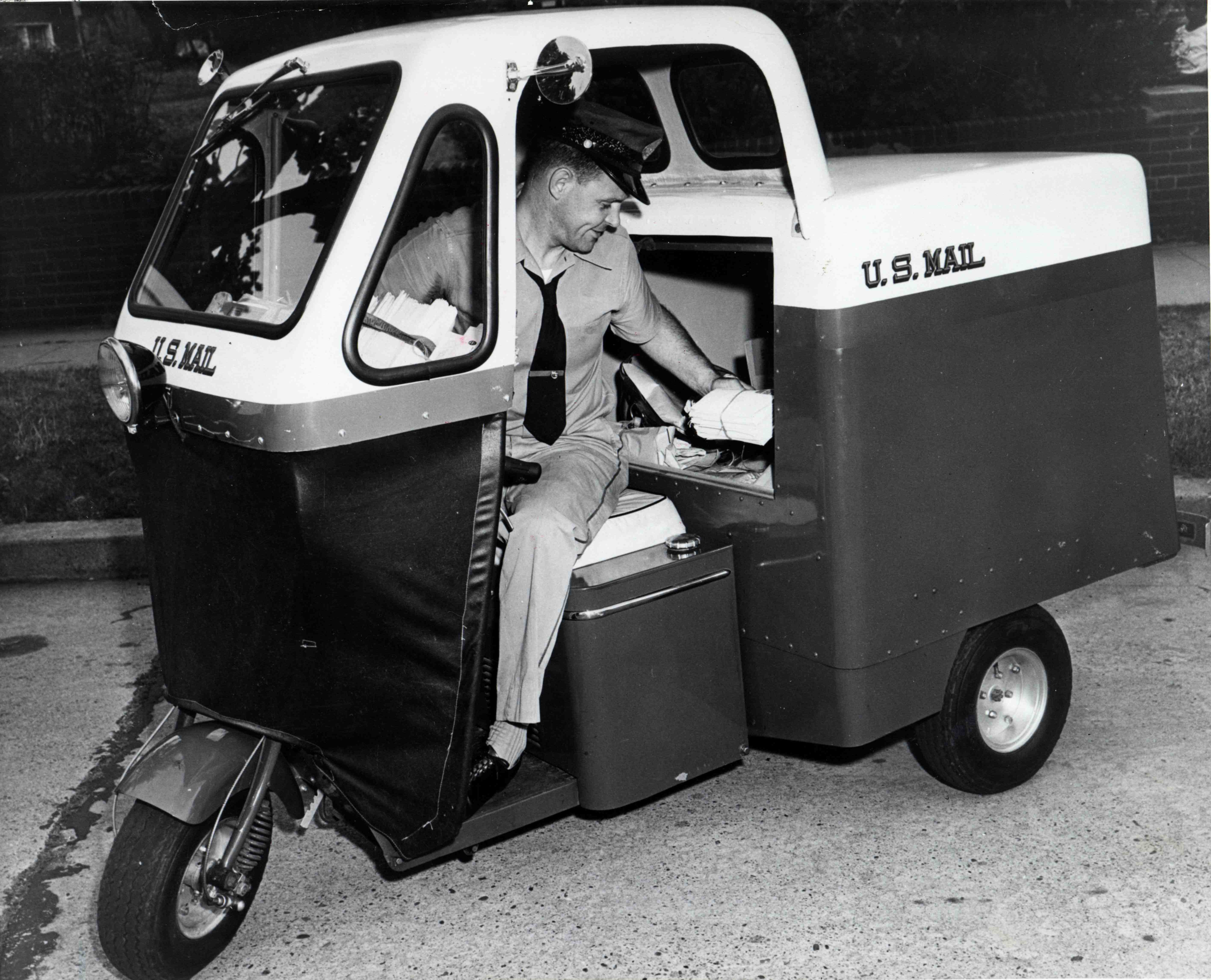
Letter carrier in the vehicle

The Westcoaster Mailster was a small three-wheeled vehicle used for mail delivery by the United States Post Office Department during the 1950s and 60s. They could haul 500 pounds of mail, including large parcels, versus the 35-pound limit of a foot carrier, and once represented one-third of the delivery vehicles used by the Post Office. Because of the population boom after World War II, the postal service needed a more efficient way to deliver mail, so in 1950 the city of Miami started to test three-wheeled scooters. The Westcoaster Mailster was inexpensive, and its popularity grew fast. By 1960, there were more than 5,700 Mailsters on the road of the whole country. The number of Mailsters in use peaked in 1966, at about 17,700.

Often known as "mail scooters", Mailsters worked best in areas with warm climates and flat terrain. The two cylinder gasoline-powered vehicle had a safe top speed of 35 miles per hour and a 7.5 horsepower engine. A Mailster could be rendered useless in just three inches of snowfall. Mail carriers often complained of frequent breakdowns ranging from clutch failure to broken front axles. If a Mailster rounded a corner too quickly, it was also prone to tipping over.

At least seven different companies produced Mailsters, including Cushman.

The Mailster was eventually replaced by more reliable mail delivery vehicles, such as Jeeps.

== See also ==
- List of motorized trikes
