= Eshelman =

Defunct American motor vehicle manufacturer

Eshelman was a marque of small American automobiles (1953–1961) and other vehicles and implements including motor scooters, garden tractors, pleasure boats, aircraft, golf carts, snowplows, trailers, mail-delivery vehicles and more. The Cheston L. Eshelman Company was incorporated on January 19, 1942, and was based on the sixth floor of an industrial building at 109 Light Street in Baltimore, Maryland, with aircraft production facilities located in Dundalk, Maryland. The company president was Cheston Lee Eshelman, the first vice-president was Sidney S. Zell (July 30, 1900 – July 1978), and the first treasurer was Frank K. Kris (January 4, 1910 – March 1981).

The Eshelman company began production of commercial light aircraft in Dundalk after World War II, but was best known toward mid-century for its inexpensive light garden tractors and similar machines (including the Kulti-Mower) which were widely promoted in small advertisements in the back pages of mechanical and scientific magazines.

== Children's cars ==
In 1953 the Cheston L. Eshelman Company, which had produced light aircraft immediately after World War II and then pleasure boats (including the spectacular "Rocket Boat", built from surplus military aircraft wing tanks), lightweight garden tractors and other implements, began producing a tiny air-cooled, one-cylinder automobile, the "Sport Car", in two versions: a basic $295 15 MPH "Child's Sport Car" (CSC) for two children and powered by a two-horsepower Briggs & Stratton #6 engine, and the $395 25 MPH Model 2 "Adult Sport Car" (ASC) for one adult which featured the three-horsepower Briggs & Stratton #8 engine, battery-operated head and tail lamps, seat-cushion upholstery, and trademark chrome "rocket" emblems on its flanks.

A factory brochure advertised 70 MPG fuel consumption and claimed the car was

Ideal for short trips. When it's too far to walk—to the shopping center, to the beach, to work—this little car is the perfect 'runabout'. Even the children can use it about your property. It's so easy to operate and sturdily built. Add an Eshelman trailer cart and it's perfect for hauling and light delivery.

Both models were 54 inches (1,400 mm) in length, 24 inches (610 mm) wide, and 23 inches (580 mm) in height. With its heavy plate-steel platform frames, the CSC weighed 225 lb (102 kg) while the Model 2 ASC (with its larger engine and added accessories) weighed nearly 250 lb (110 kg).

In the earliest models, power from the engine (which was mounted in front, started by rope, and operated with a hand throttle) was transferred by a long drive belt to a simple lever-operated forward/reverse transmission between the rear wheels. This transmission was under the bench seat, and drove power to serrated, cast iron "gears" which drove the wheels through contact friction atop the 2.25x10 semi-pneumatic tire treads. Braking action was accomplished by reversing the transmission.

This unsatisfactory system resulted in heavy tire wear and was soon replaced by a drive belt from an engine-mounted centrifugal clutch to a jackshaft under the seat, and from there by forward-only chain drive to sprockets on one or both rear wheels. The brake pedal mechanically applied paddles to the rear tire treads. Several basic colors were offered (and at least one two-tone combination), with contrasting-color interiors on Adult Sport Car models.

In 1955, vice president Richard M. Nixon was photographed at a gasoline pump "fueling" a Child's Sport Car in a March of Dimes "Fill 'Er Up for Polio" publicity campaign while holding the pump nozzle at the car's rear. Actually, most Eshelman cars were fueled under the hood.

There were a few Eshelman dealers—and customers could take delivery at the Baltimore factory showroom—but business was largely conducted by mail order.

The Sport Car was mostly advertised through postage stamp-sized advertisements in home-crafting and scientific magazines (and occasionally in coffee table magazines) and delivered to buyers in cartons by truck freight. However, the Eshelman company soon found that some customers were disappointed at first sight of the cars' tiny size and were repackaging and returning the cars to the factory. To counter this, the Eshelman company soon implemented a no-return purchase policy.

The cars were popular as gifts, advertising premiums and promotional novelties. US Congressman Francis E. Dorn campaigned for re-election using a specially lettered 1954 Eshelman Child's Sport Car.

== Adult cars ==
By 1955 a second, larger model was added to the Eshelman line, a basic six-horsepower open car for two passengers also named the "Adult Sport Car". These ASCs were 64 inches (1,600 mm) long, 36 inches (910 mm) wide and 32 inches (810 mm) in height and were powered by an air-cooled rope-started Briggs & Stratton #14 engine (electric starting was optional) that permitted a top speed of 30 mph (48 km/h) and a 70 mpg_{‑US} (3.4 L/100 km; 84 mpg_{‑imp}) fuel consumption rate. Major ASC mechanical differences included 4.50x6 pneumatic tires with four-wheel cable-operated scrub brakes, a foot throttle, and a pedal-operated parking brake. Extra-cost options included a lawn sweeper ($39.95) and a hauling cart ($79.95). The Adult Sport Car was 40inches wide and was equipped with headlamps and taillamps powered by a separate battery that needed occasional charging, as there was no generator.

The following year saw a minor restyling on both models including an opening hood, cut-down sides for easier entry and exit, and fully opened rear wheel wells. A utility version of this car was offered for use on golf courses (and advertised as providing "36 holes per gallon"). Also from 1956, the smaller models were powered by Briggs and Stratton aluminum-block engines; the Model 6B engine of 2.25 horsepower in the standard series and the Model 8B engine of 2.75 horsepower in the deluxe cars.

But on Friday, February 10, 1956, a massive fire consumed the Eshelman factory. Two hundred firefighters and two fireboats helped to extinguish the blaze, and the fire resulted in $500,000 in damage.

At about that time, the city of Baltimore began taxing manufacturing inventories and equipment, and so in February 1957 Cheston Eshelman signed a ten-year contract with the Charles D. Briddell Company, makers of cutlery, to build Eshelman cars and other vehicles at its Crisfield, Maryland, facility. A decision was also made to upgrade the cars, and Eshelman introduced several versions of the new and more-streetworthy two-passenger "Sportabout", a 675-pound enclosed model of the Adult Sport Car with a Model 23 Briggs and Stratton 8.4 horsepower single-cylinder engine. The 72-inch-long Eshelman Sportabout had more appurtenances, including electric starting and windshield wiper, reverse gear, directional signals, a 60-inch tall aluminum top, doors, spring suspension, foam upholstery, and a horn. All Sportabouts were painted red with silver doors and were shipped to buyers' addresses in wooden crates. Television star Bob Cummings (The Bob Cummings Show) became a spokesman for the Eshelman company in newspaper and magazine ads, and often featured Child Sport Cars on his programs. A new battery-powered child's car, the Model 200, was added, and thousands of the company's blue Mailster mail-delivery vehicles were seen on the streets of America, closely resembling the very similar Cushman mail carrier design.

By 1959 the Eshelman company, now renamed the Eshelman Motors Corporation, introduced a trio of much larger $1,395 two-cylinder air-cooled closed models, the fiberglass-bodied Models 902 delivery vehicle, 903 coupe and 904 pickup truck, all advertised as seating three passengers abreast. However, according to reports only about twelve or so were produced.

Eshelman then turned to buying new fleet-model Chevrolet Corvairs in quantity, which were re-trimmed and re-badged with special gold-colored Eshelman insignia and other appearance changes and marketed to the public as "Eshelman Golden Eagles". When General Motors learned of this operation, it ordered Eshelman Motors to cease and desist, but Eshelman continued to market the appearance package for those who wished to apply them to their personal cars.

Concurrently, Cheston Eshelman moved to Miami, Florida, and worked on marketing his patented "crash absorber," a pioneering 15 mph (24 km/h) energy-absorbing front bumper fashioned from a vehicle's spare tire. He often demonstrated the bumper by ramming his own car into retaining walls.

In 1967, Eshelman produced the final Eshelman Golden Eagle Safety Cars based on new 1967 Chevrolets, all equipped with front "crash absorbers" and sold through several used-car agencies. This marked the end of Eshelman's automotive efforts and other operations, but he continued to invent and patent his ideas for decades. He died on November 7, 2004, in Hialeah, Florida.

== Products ==
=== Aircraft ===
- Eshelman FW-5
