= Evan Kemp =

American disability rights activist

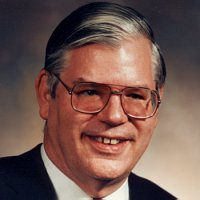
- Kemp in 1990

Chair of the Equal Employment Opportunity Commission
- In office March 8, 1990 – April 2, 1993
- President: George H. W. Bush; Bill Clinton
- Preceded by: Clarence Thomas
- Succeeded by: Tony Gallegos (acting)

Commissioner of the Equal Employment Opportunity Commission
- In office June 19, 1987 – April 2, 1993
- President: Ronald Reagan; George H. W. Bush; Bill Clinton
- Preceded by: William Arthur Webb

Personal details
- Born: May 5, 1937 New York City, New York, U.S.
- Died: August 12, 1997 (aged 60) Washington, D.C., U.S.
- Party: Republican
- Spouse: Janine Bertram
- Education: Washington and Lee University (BA); University of Virginia (LLB)

Evan Jennings Kemp, Jr. (May 5, 1937 – August 12, 1997) was an American disability rights activist who served as chairman of the Equal Employment Opportunity Commission from 1990 to 1993.

== Biography ==
Kemp was born on May 5, 1937, in New York City and grew up in Cleveland Heights, Ohio. He received his BA degree from Washington and Lee University in 1959 and his LLB from the University of Virginia School of Law in 1964. Throughout his early life, he had difficulty walking, and he would noticeably lurch when he did so. In 1971, his leg was severely fractured when a garage door slammed down on it, rendering it completely impossible for him to walk, leading him to use a wheelchair.

Kemp served as executive director of the Disability Rights Center from 1980 until 1987, when he was appointed to the Equal Employment Opportunity Commission (EEOC) by then-President Ronald Reagan to succeed William Arthur Webb. He was confirmed to the EEOC During the next three years, Kemp played a significant role in helping to draft the Americans with Disabilities Act of 1990. In February 1989, shortly after Reagan's Vice President George H. W. Bush had taken office as president, Kemp stated that Bush had told him that he was Bush's preferred candidate to become the new United States Assistant Attorney General for the Civil Rights Division.

In the fall of 1989, Bush chose Kemp to be the new chairman of the EEOC, and Kemp assumed this role on March 8, 1990, replacing Clarence Thomas. As chairman of the EEOC, Kemp was greatly involved in the drafting of the final rules of the Americans with Disabilities Act when it took effect in 1992. Kemp remained chairman of the EEOC until April 2, 1993, when he resigned the position; he had announced his resignation on March 26, 1993, in a letter to President Bill Clinton.

Kemp died on August 12, 1997, at a hospital near his home in Washington, D.C. His cause of death was not immediately known, but his wife, Janine Bertram, stated at the time that it was unrelated to Kugelberg-Welander disease, which he had had since the age of 12.
