= Mary Sally Matiella =

American government official

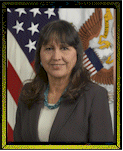

14th Assistant Secretary of the Army (Financial Management and Comptroller)
- In office February 16, 2010 – February 27, 2014
- President: Barack Obama
- Preceded by: Nelson M. Ford
- Succeeded by: Robert M. Speer

Personal details
- Born: Mary Sally Garza; June 21, 1951 (age 75) Three Rivers, Texas, U.S.
- Party: Democratic
- Education: University of Arizona (BA, MBA)

Mary Sally Matiella (born June 21, 1951) is an American government official and political candidate who served as the Assistant Secretary of the Army (Financial Management and Comptroller) during the Obama Administration. After several decades of federal civil service, Matiella served as the Assistant Secretary of the Army, holding office from February 16, 2010, until February 27, 2014, when she resigned and was succeeded by Robert M. Speer.

In 2018, Matiella ran as a Democrat for the United States House of Representatives from Arizona's 2nd congressional district. She placed third in the primary election, behind former U.S. Representative Ann Kirkpatrick and former state representative Matt Heinz.

== Early life and education ==
Mary Sally Matiella (née Garza), born in Three Rivers, Texas, grew up as the child of migrant farmworkers. The family moved to Arizona when she was 6 months old. In between her junior and senior years at Pueblo High School, she took a summer job at Davis–Monthan Air Force Base and met Airman Francisco Matiella, whom she married seven years later. Francisco suggested she go to college.

She earned a Regents' Scholarship into the University of Arizona, receiving a B.A. in 1973 and an M.B.A. in 1976. In 2013, she was named the University of Arizona, College of Education Alum of the year.

== Career ==
After college, worked as a management analyst for the University of Texas at Austin and as an auditor for the Texas Department of Mental Health and Mental Retardation.

=== Federal Civil Service ===
In 1980, Matiella began a career as a civilian employee of the United States Armed Forces. She served as a budget analyst at Ramstein Air Base from 1980 to 1983; as a systems accountant for the United States Air Force Accounting Service, based in Denver from 1983 to 1986; and as a senior systems accountant at Fort Clayton from 1986 to 1989. She then returned to Denver, working at the Defense Finance and Accounting Service (DFAS) as a systems accountant 1989–1992; a staff accountant 1992–1994; and then as Director of the CFO Implementation Office 1994–1995. From 1995 to 1998, she was Director of Accounting at the DFAS office in San Bernardino, California.

Matiella was a staff accountant in the Office of the Under Secretary of Defense (Comptroller), a position she held until 2001. She was working in the Pentagon at the time of the September 11 attacks.

Matiella became a member of the Senior Executive Service in December 2001, becoming Chief Financial Officer of the United States Forest Service. There, she oversaw a $4 billion annual budget. She later served as Assistant Chief Financial Officer for Accounting for the United States Department of Housing and Urban Development overseeing a $40 billion budget until her retirement in 2008.

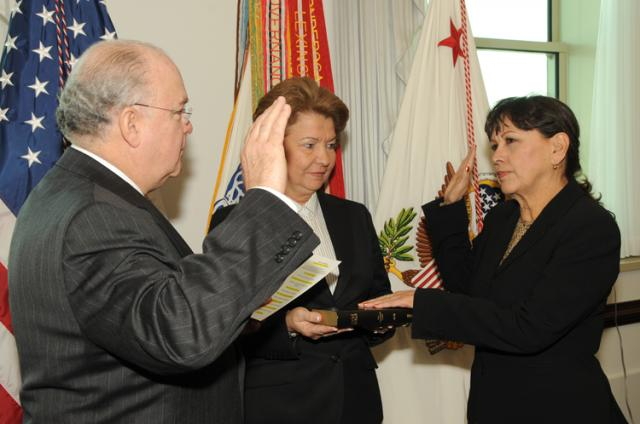
United States Under Secretary of the Army Joseph W. Westphal swears in Matiella as Assistant Secretary of the Army (Financial Management and Comptroller) on February 16, 2010.

On November 23, 2009, President of the United States Barack Obama nominated Matiella to be Assistant Secretary of the Army (Financial Management and Comptroller). After Senate confirmation, she was sworn into office by United States Under Secretary of the Army Joseph W. Westphal on February 16, 2010. During her service, she visited soldiers in Iraq. She retired in 2014.

=== Political Office ===
In 2017, Matiella announced she would challenge Republican Congresswoman Martha McSally for her seat in the United States House of Representatives representing Arizona's 2nd congressional district. Positioning herself as a progressive Democrat, she was endorsed by Justice Democrats. She placed third in the Democratic primary election, and former U.S. Rep. Ann Kirkpatrick was eventually elected.
