= Daniel Fuss =

American businessman

Daniel Fuss is the vice chairman of Loomis, Sayles & Company and manager of the $18.5 billion Loomis Sayles Bond Fund. SmartMoney magazine in July 2008 called him one of the world's best investors.

He earned his bachelor's and MBA degrees at Marquette University. He is a former U.S. Navy lieutenant. He formerly managed the Yale University endowment.

He manages the Bond Fund with Matt Eagan.
