= Robert Speer =

Robert Speer may refer to:

- Robert Elliott Speer (1867–1947), American religious leader
- Robert M. Speer (born 1956), acting secretary of the US Army
- Robert Milton Speer (1838–1890), American politician from Pennsylvania
- Robert W. Speer (1855–1918), mayor of Denver, Colorado, United States
