= Assistant Secretary of the Army (Financial Management and Comptroller) =

Office of the US army

United States Assistant Secretary of the Army (Financial Management and Comptroller)
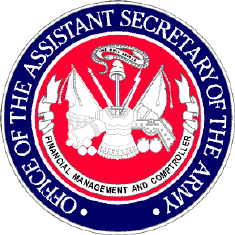
- Seal of the Office of the Assistant Secretary of the Army (Financial Management and Comptroller)

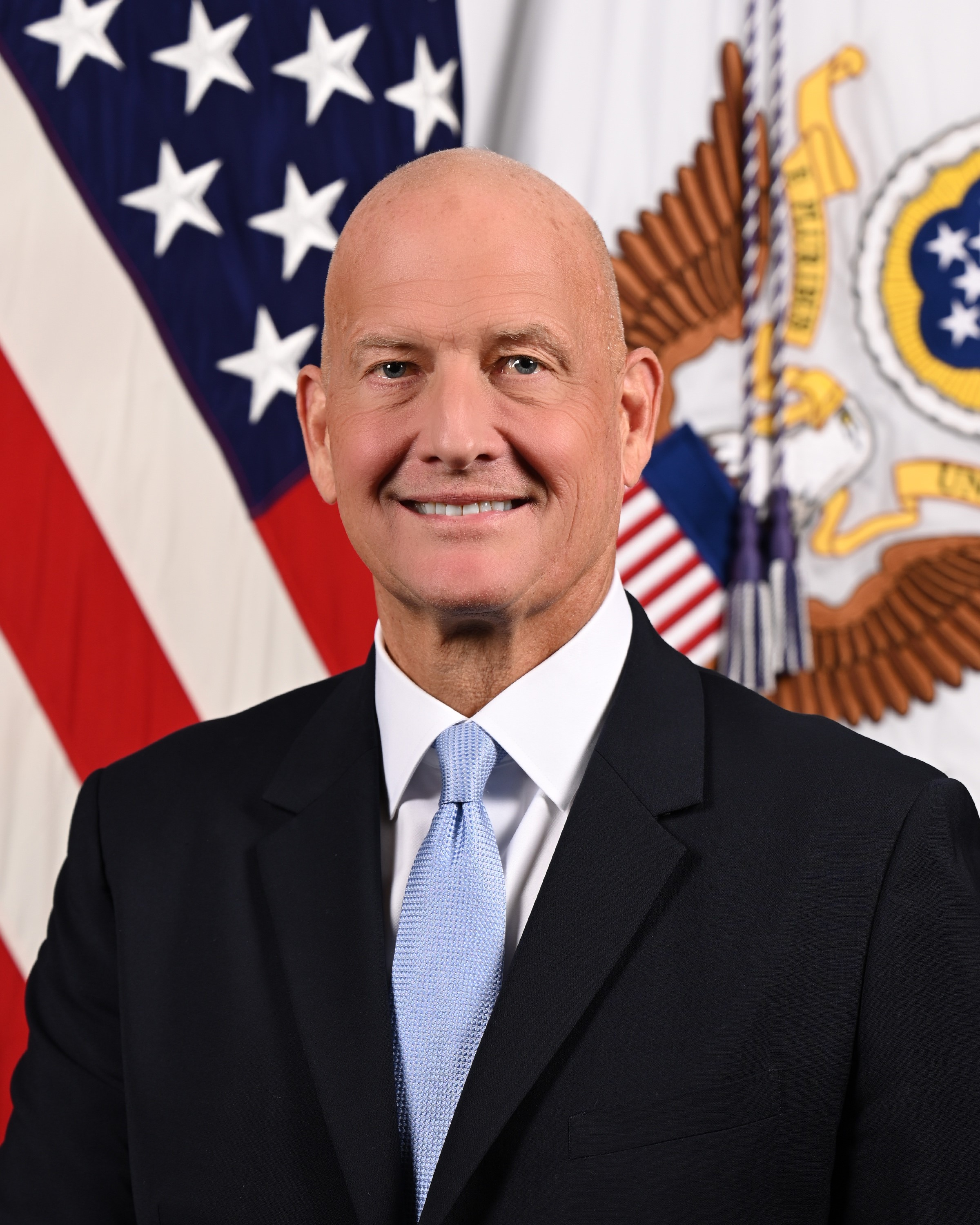
- Incumbent; Marc Andersen since 15 October 2025
- United States Department of the Army
- Style: Mr./Madam Secretary; The Honorable (formal address in writing)
- Reports to: Secretary of the Army; Under Secretary of the Army
- Seat: The Pentagon, Arlington County, Virginia, United States
- Nominator: The president with Senate advice and consent
- Term length: No fixed term
- Constituting instrument: 10. U.S.C. § 7016
- Formation: 1954
- First holder: George H. Roderick
- Succession: Joint 18th in SecDef succession in seniority of appointment
- Deputy: Principal Deputy Assistant Secretary of the Army for Financial Management and Comptroller
- Salary: Executive Schedule, Level IV
- Website: Official website

Assistant Secretary of the Army (Financial Management and Comptroller) (abbreviated ASA(FM&C)) is a civilian office in the United States Department of the Army.

The office of Assistant Secretary of the Army (Financial Management and Comptroller) grows out of a reorganization of the Department of the Army initiated in 1954 by United States secretary of the Army Robert T. Stevens and largely designed by United States under secretary of the Army John Slezak.

The mission of the assistant secretary of the Army (financial management and comptroller) is to formulate, submit, and defend the United States Army's budget to the United States Congress and the American public; to oversee the proper and effective use of appropriated resources to accomplish the Army's assigned missions; to provide timely, accurate, and reliable financial information to enable leaders and managers to incorporate cost considerations into their decision-making; to provide transparent reporting to Congress and the American public on the use of appropriated resources and the achievement of established army-wide performance objectives; and manage and coordinate programs for the accession, training, and professional development of army resource managers.

== List of assistant secretaries of the Army (financial management and comptroller), 1954—present (incomplete) ==
Name	Assumed office	Left office	President appointed by	Secretary served under
George H. Roderick	9 February 1954	25 August 1954	Dwight D. Eisenhower	Robert T. Stevens
Charles C. Finucane	26 August 1954	8 February 1955	Dwight D. Eisenhower	Robert T. Stevens
Chester R. Davis	10 March 1955	15 December 1956	Dwight D. Eisenhower	Robert T. Stevens, Wilber M. Brucker
George H. Roderick	1 March 1957	20 January 1961	Dwight D. Eisenhower	Wilber M. Brucker
William F. Schaub	2 March 1961	31 December 1962	John F. Kennedy	Elvis Jacob Stahr Jr., Cyrus Vance
Edmund T. Pratt Jr.	23 March 1963	25 November 1964	John F. Kennedy, Lyndon B. Johnson	Cyrus Vance, Stephen Ailes
Michael P. W. Stone	27 May 1986	12 May 1988	Ronald Reagan	Frank Carlucci
Kenneth B. Kramer	14 October 1988	September 1989	Ronald Reagan	Frank Carlucci
Douglas A. Brook	28 February 1990	1992	George H. W. Bush	Michael P. W. Stone
Helen T. McCoy	January 1994	January 2001	William J. Clinton	Togo D. West Jr, Louis Caldera
Sandra L. Pack	November 2001	December 2003	George W. Bush	Thomas E. White
Valerie L. Baldwin	July 2004	2006	George W. Bush	Francis J. Harvey
Nelson M. Ford	October 2006	December 2007	George W. Bush	Francis J. Harvey, Pete Geren
Mary Sally Matiella	16 February 2010	27 February 2014	Barack Obama	John M. McHugh
Robert M. Speer	20 November 2014	19 January 2017	Barack Obama	John M. McHugh
John E. Whitley	26 September 2018	28 May 2021	Donald Trump	Mark Esper, Ryan McCarthy
Caral Spangler	17 August 2021	20 January 2025	Joe Biden	Christine Wormuth
R. Wesley Robinson (Performing the Duties of)	20 January 2025	12 May 2025	Donald Trump	Mark Averill (Acting); Daniel P. Driscoll
Candice Kinn (Acting)	12 May 2025	15 October 2025	Donald Trump	Daniel P. Driscoll
Marc Andersen	15 October 2025	Present	Donald Trump	Daniel P. Driscoll; Adam Telle (Acting)

== Deputy assistant secretaries ==
One principal deputy assistant secretary of the Army and three deputy assistant secretaries of the Army roles reporting to the assistant secretary (ASA(FM&C)):

- Principal Deputy Assistant Secretary of the Army for Financial Management & Comptroller (PDASA-FM&C) – (non-career appointment)
  - Deputy Assistant Secretary of the Army for Financial Operations & Information (DASA-FOI)
  - Deputy Assistant Secretary of the Army for Cost & Economics (DASA-CE)
  - Deputy Assistant Secretary of the Army for Budget (DASA-BU)

A military deputy also reports to the assistant secretary, with the grade of lieutenant general.
