= General Milton =

General Milton may refer to:

- Hugh M. Milton II (1897–1987), U.S. Army major general
- Theodore R. Milton (1915–2010) U.S. Air Force general
- Tony Milton (born 1949), Royal Marines major general
