= Earl D. Johnson =

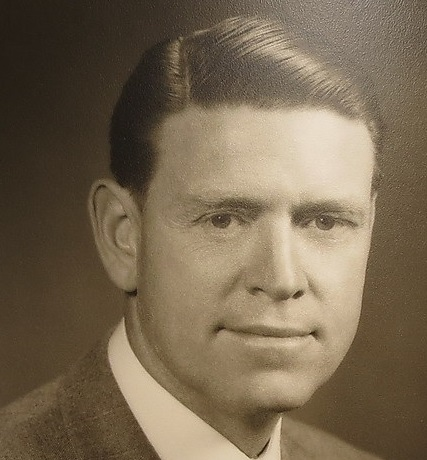

6th United States Under Secretary of the Army
- In office October 1952 – January 1954
- President: Harry S. Truman
- Preceded by: Karl Bendetsen
- Succeeded by: John Slezak

Acting United States Secretary of the Army
- In office January 20, 1953 – February 4, 1953
- President: Harry S. Truman
- Preceded by: Frank Pace
- Succeeded by: Robert T. Stevens

Personal details
- Born: December 14, 1905 Hamilton, Ohio, U.S.
- Died: January 11, 1990 (aged 84) Greenwich, Connecticut, U.S.
- Spouse: Myrtle "Honey" Vietmeyer
- Children: Raud Earl Johnson (Alexander), Susan Lynn Johnson (Darby & Carrie), Cynthia Lee Johnson (Donna, Noel, Tuesday)
- Education: University of Wisconsin; BA

Military service
- Branch/service: United States Army Air Corps; United States Army Air Forces
- Years of service: 1932; 1942–1946
- Rank: Colonel

Earl D. Johnson (December 14, 1905 – January 11, 1990) was United States Under Secretary of the Army from 1952 to 1954.

== Biography ==
Earl Dallum Johnson was born in Hamilton, Ohio, on December 14, 1905. He was educated at the University of Wisconsin–Madison, receiving a B.A. in 1928. He then spent a year as a graduate student at the University of Wisconsin–Madison, before enrolling in the United States Army Air Corps Training School, graduating as a pilot in 1932.

Johnson worked at Loomis, Sayles & Company from 1933 to 1942. During World War II, he saw active duty as deputy commander of the Ferrying Division at the Air Transport Command. He left the United States Army Air Forces as a colonel in 1946. He then returned to Loomis, Sayles.

In 1950, President of the United States Harry Truman nominated Johnson as Assistant Secretary of the Army (Research and Materiel). He held this office until 1952, at which time President Truman nominated him as United States Under Secretary of the Army. He subsequently held this office from October 1952 until January 1954. Johnson also served as acting Secretary of the Army from January 20 to February 4, 1953, when Frank Pace left the post and awaiting the confirmation of incoming Secretary Robert T. Stevens. He also served as chairman of the Panama Canal Company from 1953 until 1954.

Upon leaving government service in 1954, Johnson became an executive at American Transport Association and Air Cargo Inc. In 1955, he left for General Dynamics. In 1963, he left GD, spending a year as CEO at Delta Air Lines before retiring in 1964. Upon retirement Johnson served on several boards and often provided strategic consulting services to several politicians and private corporations. Johnson was a member of the Explorer's Club (he was on the first flight to both Poles and subsequently flew to Antarctica on more than one occasion with colleagues and friends), the Union Club and Greenwich Country Club where there is a skeet shooting tournament held annually in his name.

Johnson died in Greenwich, Connecticut, on January 11, 1990. There were two services celebrating his life: 1) Christ Church, Greenwich, Connecticut, and 2) at Arlington National Cemetery, where there was a 21-gun salute in his honor. He is buried there with his spouse, Honey. Johnson's family launched a scholarship in his name at University of Wisconsin for students in need who maintain a 3.8 GPA.

Government offices
Preceded by Tracy Voorhees	Assistant Secretary of the Army; May 31, 1950 – May 7, 1952	Succeeded by Office abolished
Preceded by Karl Bendetsen	United States Under Secretary of the Army; October 1952 – January 1954	Succeeded by John Slezak
Preceded by Frank Pace	Acting United States Secretary of the Army; January 20, 1953 – February 4, 1953	Succeeded by Robert T. Stevens
