= Assistant Secretary of the Army =

Personal flag used by assistant secretaries of the Army

Assistant Secretary of the Army is a title used to describe various civilian officials in the United States Department of the Army.

== Present assistant secretaries ==
At present, there are five offices bearing the title of Assistant Secretary of the Army:

- Assistant Secretary of the Army (Acquisition, Logistics and Technology)
- Assistant Secretary of the Army (Civil Works)
- Assistant Secretary of the Army (Financial Management and Comptroller)
- Assistant Secretary of the Army (Installations, Energy and Environment)
- Assistant Secretary of the Army (Manpower and Reserve Affairs)

The general counsel is equivalent in rank to the assistant secretaries.

The five assistant secretaries and the GC report to and assist the secretary and under secretary of the Army.

By law, the assistant secretaries "shall be appointed from civilian life by the president, by and with the advice and consent of the Senate".

== History ==
The office of assistant secretary of the Army was established at the time of the creation of the United States Department of Defense in 1947, and assumed many of the duties previously carried out by the assistant secretary of war in the United States Department of War. In February 1950, a second office, Assistant Secretary of the Army (General Management) was added. In May 1952, Assistant Secretary of the Army Earl D. Johnson's office was renamed Assistant Secretary of the Army (Research and Materiel), making Jones the last individual to bear the stand-alone title of Assistant Secretary of the Army. In addition to the current offices bearing the title of Assistant Secretary of the Army, several individuals have held office as some type of assistant secretary, as shown below.

=== Former assistant secretaries ===
==== Army (1947–1952) ====
Name	Assumed office	Left office	President appointed by	Secretary served under
Gordon Gray	September 24, 1947	May 24, 1948	Harry S. Truman	Kenneth Claiborne Royall
Tracy Voorhees	June 17, 1948	August 21, 1949	Harry S. Truman	Kenneth Claiborne Royall, Gordon Gray
Earl D. Johnson	May 31, 1950	May 7, 1952	Harry S. Truman	Frank Pace

==== General management (1950–1953) ====
Name	Assumed office	Left office	President appointed by	Secretary served under
Karl Bendetsen	February 2, 1950	May 6, 1952	Harry S. Truman	Frank Pace
Francis Shackelford	August 26, 1952	20 January 1953	Harry S. Truman	Kenneth Claiborne Royall, Gordon Gray

==== Research and materiel (1952) ====
Name	Assumed office	Left office	President appointed by	Secretary served under
Earl D. Johnson	May 7, 1952	October 20, 1952	Harry S. Truman	Frank Pace

==== Materiel (1953–1954) ====
Name	Assumed office	Left office	President appointed by	Secretary served under
John Slezak	May 4, 1953	February 7, 1954	Dwight D. Eisenhower	Robert T. Stevens

==== Civil-military affairs (1954–1958) ====
Name	Assumed office	Left office	President appointed by	Secretary served under
George H. Roderick	August 26, 1954	February 29, 1957	Dwight D. Eisenhower	Robert T. Stevens, Wilber M. Brucker
Dewey Jackson Short	March 15, 1957	November 1958	Dwight D. Eisenhower	Wilber M. Brucker
