= Hugh M. Milton II =

United States major general (1897–1987)

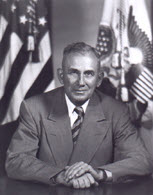

United States Under Secretary of the Army
- In office August 1958 – January 1961
- President: Dwight D. Eisenhower
- Preceded by: Charles C. Finucane
- Succeeded by: Stephen Ailes

Personal details
- Born: March 23, 1897
- Died: January 27, 1987 (aged 89) El Paso, Texas, U.S.
- Education: University of Kentucky

Military service
- Allegiance: United States
- Branch/service: United States Army
- Years of service: ~1917–1947
- Rank: Major General

Hugh Meglone Milton II (March 23, 1897 – January 27, 1987) was a major general of the United States Army during World War II who served as United States Under Secretary of the Army from 1958 to 1961.

== Biography ==
Hugh M. Milton II was born on March 23, 1897. He is descended from British poet John Milton. He was educated at the University of Kentucky, receiving a bachelor's degree and then a master's degree in mechanical engineering. Milton joined the army around the time of the American entry into World War I.

He joined the faculty of New Mexico State University as a professor of mechanical engineering in 1924. Two years later he was named dean of engineering. During his time at New Mexico State University, Milton became a member of Tau Kappa Epsilon fraternity. He became president of New Mexico State University in 1938.

With the United States' entry into World War II, in 1941, Milton was recalled to the United States Army with the rank of colonel. He was later promoted to brigadier general in 1945. He left the Army in 1947, having attained the rank of major general.

In 1947, Milton resumed the presidency of New Mexico State University.

In 1953, President of the United States Dwight D. Eisenhower nominated Milton as Assistant Secretary of the Army and he served in this post until 1958, when President Eisenhower named him United States Under Secretary of the Army. Milton served as Under Secretary of the Army from August 1958 until January 1961.

Milton retired from the United States Department of the Army in 1961. He died at the William Beaumont Army Medical Center in El Paso, Texas, on January 27, 1987, at the age of 89.

Government offices
Preceded by Charles C. Finucane	United States Under Secretary of the Army; August 1958 – January 1961	Succeeded by Stephen Ailes
