= George Muñoz =

American businessman and attorney

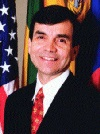

President and CEO of the Overseas Private Investment Corporation
- In office 1997–2001
- President: Bill Clinton
- Preceded by: Ruth Harkin
- Succeeded by: Peter Watson

Assistant Secretary of the Treasury for Management
- In office 1993–1997
- President: Bill Clinton
- Preceded by: Position established
- Succeeded by: Nancy Killefer

President of the Chicago Board of Education
- In office 1984–1987
- Preceded by: Sol Brandzel
- Succeeded by: Frank Gardner

Personal details
- Born: May 2, 1951 (age 74) Brownsville, Texas, U.S.
- Party: Democratic
- Education: University of Texas, Austin (BA); Harvard University (JD, MPP); DePaul University (LLM); Catholic Distance University (MA)

George Muñoz is an American businessman, CPA and attorney. He is the president and co-founder of Muñoz Investment Banking Group which is primarily focused on financing and investments in the Emerging Markets Countries as well as in the U.S. Hispanic community. He is also a partner at Tobin & Muñoz, a Chicago-based law firm focused on commercial litigation, white collar investigations and litigation, and international transactions, where he works out of the firm's Chicago and Washington, D.C. offices.

== Early life and education ==
Muñoz earned his BBA degree in accounting at the University of Texas at Austin (Business Honors Program 1974). He received a J.D. degree from Harvard Law School and a Master of Public Policy from Harvard Kennedy School in 1978. He received a Master of Laws in Taxation degree from DePaul University College of Law in 1984 and a Master of Arts in Theology in 2019.

Later, Muñoz taught MBA courses at Georgetown University.

== Career ==
Muñoz is licensed in several states as an attorney and Certified Public Accountant. He is a Certified Financial Planner and formerly served on the Certified Financial Planner Board of Standards.

In February 1984, Chicago mayor Harold Washington appointed Muñoz to the Chicago Board of Education. Three months later, in May 1984, Muñoz was elected by the board as its president. He served three one-year terms as president. In May 1987, he announced that he would not be seeking an additional term as president. He was the first Hispanic person to head the board and one of its youngest presidents. He became a national advocate for school reform and drop-out prevention programs.

He was a partner at Mayer, Brown & Platt.

He served as a member of the Chicago Economic Development Commission.

Muñoz was an assistant secretary and chief financial officer of the United States Department of the Treasury from 1993 to 1997. He was the president and CEO of the Overseas Private Investment Corporation (OPIC) from 1997 to 2001. OPIC, "the federal government's export promotion arm," provides political risk insurance, financing and private equity funds to US private sector investments in developing countries. When OPIC's future was in danger of not being reauthorized by the US Congress, Munoz is credited with turning things around for the agency and received bi-partisan support for its continuation as the primary agency for assisting private sector investments in the Emerging Market Countries.

== Advisory positions ==
Muñoz is a member of the board of directors of Altria Group (since 2004), Marriott International (since 2002) and National Geographic Society.

Muñoz recently retired from his board positions on PepsiCo (in 2023) and Black Rifle Company (in 2024).

Muñoz was appointed to the President's Commission on White House Fellows by President Barack Obama in 2009, and served until 2017.

== Personal life ==
Muñoz currently resides in Virginia. He has a wife, Kathy, and two twin sons, Mario and Manuel (b. 2002).

== Works ==
Muñoz is co-author of the book Renewing the American Dream: A Citizen's Guide For Restoring Our Competitive Advantage (2010, IMC Publishing). The book discusses what America needs to do to keep its global competitive advantage and how the next 10 years (2010–2020) will determine if the United States retains its global leadership position in this 21st century.
