= Charles C. Finucane =

American government official and banking and investments executive (1905–1983)

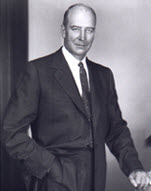

United States Under Secretary of the Army
- In office February 1955 – April 1958
- President: Dwight D. Eisenhower
- Preceded by: John Slezak
- Succeeded by: Hugh M. Milton II

Washington House Majority floor leader
- In office 1939–1940

Member of the Washington House of Representatives from the 6th district
- In office 1939–1940
- Preceded by: Lyle D. Keith
- Succeeded by: Duke Taft

Personal details
- Born: September 6, 1905 Spokane, Washington, U.S.
- Died: November 7, 1983 (aged 78)

Military service
- Allegiance: United States
- Branch/service: United States Navy
- Years of service: 1932–1948
- Rank: Commander
- Unit: United States Naval Reserves

Charles Cecil Finucane (September 6, 1905 – November 7, 1983) was an American government official, and banking and investments executive.

== Early life ==
Finucane was born in Spokane, Washington and attended the Taft School in Watertown, Connecticut. He received an engineering degree in 1928 from Sheffield School, Yale University.

== Career ==
He served as vice-president and then president of Sweeny Investment Company while also serving as an officer in the U.S. Navy Reserve. From 1936-1938 he was vice-president of the Sunshine Consolidated Mining Co. In 1938, he was elected to represent Washington's 6th legislative district in the Washington house and was selected to be the majority floor leader for the 1939 session. He only served one term in the legislature. In 1946 he served as director for both the Spokane and Eastern Division of the Seattle First National Bank and the James Smyth Plumbing and Heating Company of Spokane.

== Government career ==
He was appointed Assistant Secretary of the Army for Financial Management in 1954, the Under Secretary of the Army in 1955, and then the Assistant Secretary of Defense in 1958.

== Personal life ==
Finucane owned a summer home in Hayden, ID.

== Notes ==
Government offices
Preceded by George H. Roderick	Assistant Secretary of the Army (Financial Management and Comptroller); August 26, 1954 – February 8, 1955	Succeeded by Chester R. Davis
Preceded by John Slezak	United States Under Secretary of the Army; February 1955 – April 1958	Succeeded by Hugh M. Milton II
