= Code of Support Foundation =

U.S. nonprofit organization

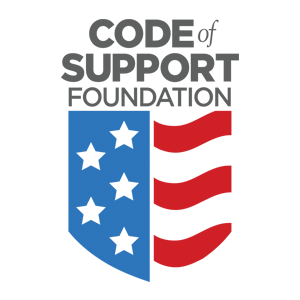
- Founded: 2011
- Founder: MG Alan Salisbury (Ret.)
- Type: Services
- Tax ID no.: 27-3485502
- Purpose: Casework, peer networking, outreach
- Location: Alexandria, Virginia
- Region served: United States
- Key people: Hon. Robert Speer, Chairman Jessa Foor, Executive Director
- Revenue: $985,770 (2024)
- Website: www.codeofsupport.org

The Code of Support Foundation (COSF) is a U.S. nonprofit organization that provides assistance to military service members, veterans and their families, many of whom face multiple and complex challenges. Based in Alexandria, Virginia, the group offers three types of programs: casework, online networking among other military service organizations, and outreach efforts.

== Background ==
COSF was founded in 2011 by retired Army major general Alan Salisbury and Kristina Kaufmann, with the goal of bridging a gap of understanding and engagement between military and civilian communities. Working with retired military and civilian leaders, Salisbury developed the group's “Code of Support,” a set of six commitments all Americans can make to give meaning to the words, “support our troops.” The group works closely with other military service organizations to coordinate complementary support efforts.

In December 2018, COSF signed a memorandum of understanding (MoU) with the Veterans Affairs Veterans Experience Office to improve access to resources for veterans, families, survivors and caregivers as well as ease of navigation.

== Services ==
Issues such as suicide prevention and mental health are particularly important to COSF. The group encourages raising awareness among local communities, including schools, to ensure better support for military families. To address these and other challenges, the foundation offers three primary services designed to meet its vision of bridging the gap between military and civilian communities.

- Case Coordination Program: COSF caseworkers provide comprehensive and long-term assistance to struggling service members, veterans and their families as they transition into civilian life. The foundation's caseworkers are trained to help address particularly complex problem sets facing families.
- PATRIOTlink: Designed to expedite, customize and streamline how other military service organizations provide support and services to their members, PATRIOTlink is a cloud-based management tool which empowers veterans and their families, and other non-profits, with the ability to leverage local and national resources to ensure coordination and efficiency.
- Education and Engagement Program: COSF works to increase public awareness and appreciation of the sacrifices and challenges facing military families. The foundation encourages the general public to join in providing support, offering a list of “99 Ways to Get Involved.”

== Oversight and awards ==
The foundation is governed by a fiduciary board of trustees. Additionally, the group relies on a board of advisors who, along with trustees, support the foundation's goals and objectives. The COSF has been recognized by the Department of Veterans Affairs for its suicide prevention work, selecting COSF as one of its 30 finalists for the VA's Mission Daybreak program. In Phase 1 of the VA’s Mission Daybreak, COSF’s PATRIOTlink was part of the 30 selected programs to receive $250,000 each and advance in the department's Phase 2 of the competition to reduce veteran suicide.

In addition, several businesses and the news media have noted the group for its innovative programs. In May 2016, the group's leaders were selected by EY as mid-Atlantic finalists for the EY Entrepreneur Of The Year Award.

== Financial matters ==
The Code of Support Foundation states that it is committed to financial transparency, and requires its partner organizations to follow the same policy. COSF has a Gold Level status with GuideStar, and is designated by the IRS as an approved 501(c)(3) tax-exempt organization.
