= Sandra L. Pack =

American government official

Assistant Secretary of the Treasury for Management & Chief Financial Officer
- In office August 2005 – December 2006
- President: George W. Bush

Assistant Secretary of the Army (Financial Management and Comptroller)
- In office November 2001 – December 2003
- President: George W. Bush

Personal details
- Born: Sandra Lee Pack
- Party: Republican
- Education: College of Notre Dame of Maryland
- Occupation: Accountant
- Known for: CFO for George W. Bush's 2000 and 2004 campaigns

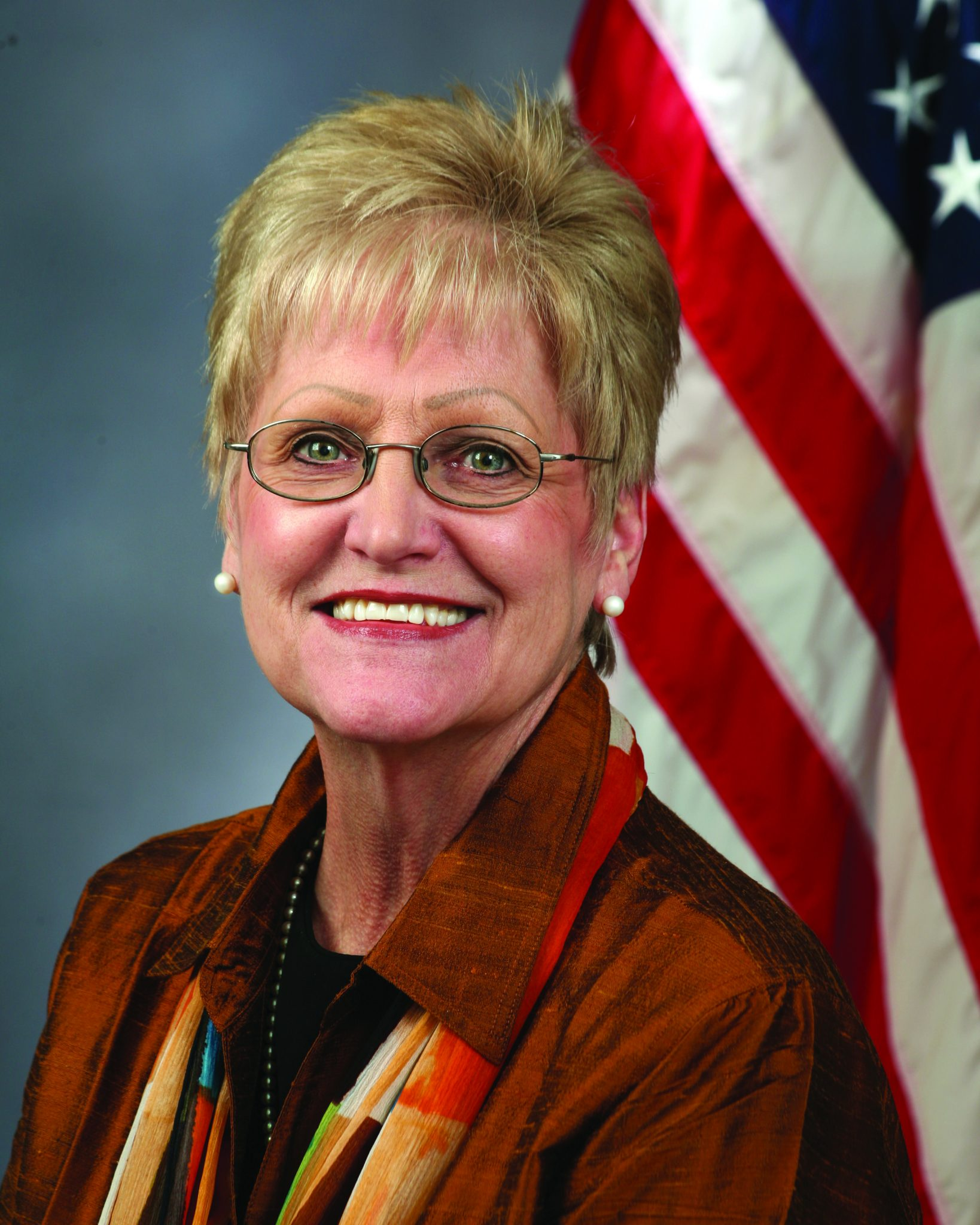
Sandra L. Pack

Sandra Lee "Sandy" Pack is an American official who served as the United States Assistant Secretary of the Army (Financial Management and Comptroller) from 2001 to 2003 and Assistant Secretary of the Treasury for Management & Chief Financial Officer from 2005 to 2006.

== Biography ==
Pack was educated at the College of Notre Dame of Maryland. After college, she worked at the accounting firm of Ernst & Young.

In February 1999, Pack became director of treasury and chief financial officer for George W. Bush's 2000 presidential campaign, reporting to campaign manager Joe Allbaugh. Following George W. Bush's victory in the 2000 U.S. presidential election, President Bush nominated Pack to be Assistant Secretary of the Army (Financial Management and Comptroller) and, after Senate confirmation, Pack held this office from November 2001 to December 2003.

In December 2003, Pack resigned from her office in the United States Department of the Army to become CFO of George W. Bush's 2004 presidential campaign, reporting to campaign manager Ken Mehlman. After Bush's victory in the 2004 U.S. presidential election, Bush nominated Pack to be Assistant Secretary of the Treasury for Management & Chief Financial Officer. Pack subsequently held this office from August 2005 to December 2006.

From December 2006 to December 2008, Pack was the CFO of the Rudy Giuliani U.S. presidential campaign. From April 2008 to September 2009, she was the John McCain presidential campaign's senior advisor to treasury and accounting.

Since September 2009, Pack has been the chief audit executive of the United States Army Corps of Engineers.

Government offices
Preceded by Helen T. McCoy	Assistant Secretary of the Army (Financial Management and Comptroller); November 2001 – December 2003	Succeeded by Valerie L. Baldwin
