= Charles Harrison Brown =

American politician (1920–2003)

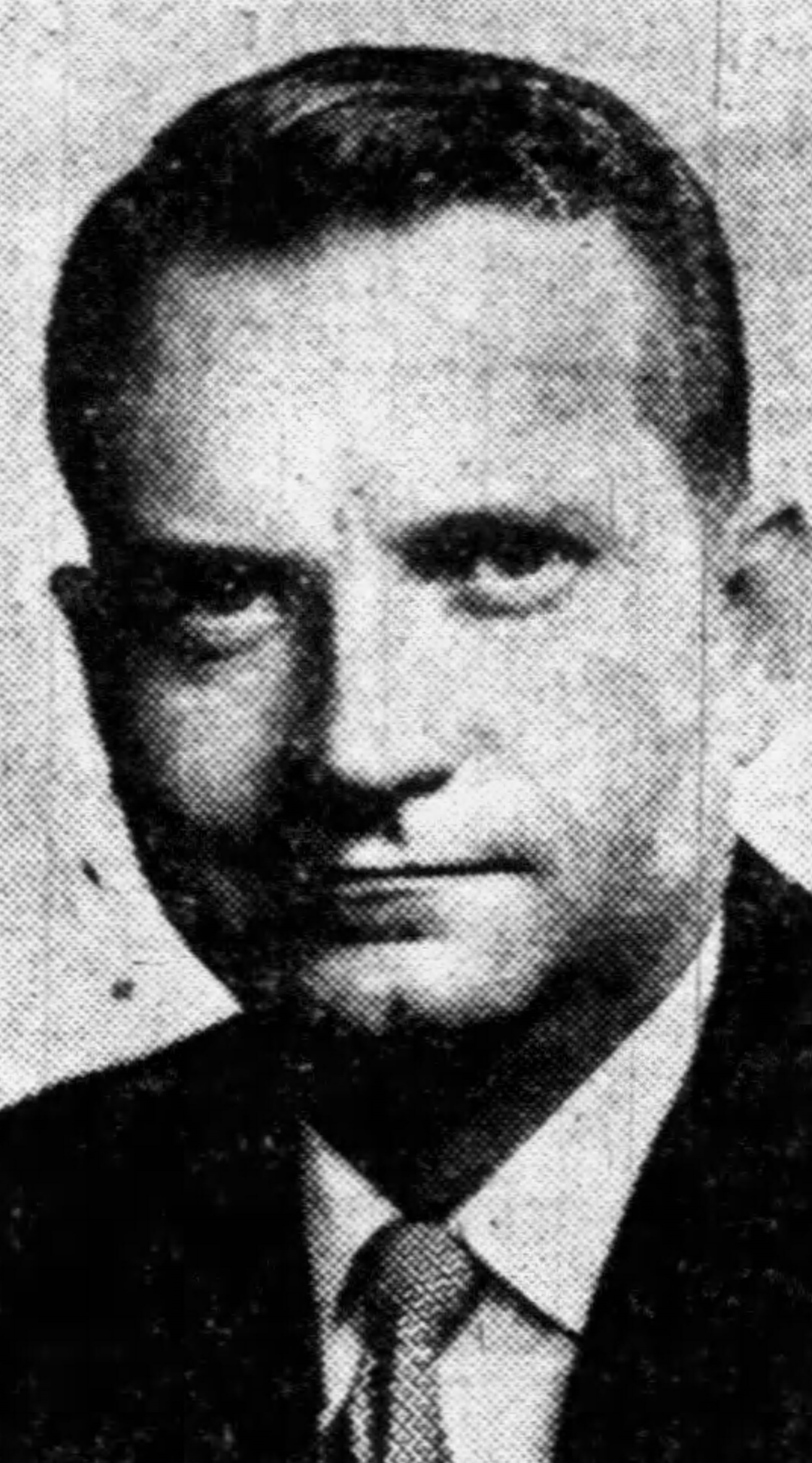
- Brown in 1959

Member of the U.S. House of Representatives from Missouri's 7th district
- In office January 3, 1957 – January 3, 1961
- Preceded by: Dewey Short
- Succeeded by: Durward G. Hall

Personal details
- Born: October 22, 1920 Coweta, Oklahoma, U.S.
- Died: June 10, 2003 (aged 82) Henderson, Nevada, U.S.
- Party: Democratic
- Spouse: Joan Brown
- Children: 2
- Education: Drury College
- Occupation: radio and TV executive advertising executive

Charles Harrison Brown (October 22, 1920 – June 10, 2003) was an American politician. A member of the Democratic Party, he served two terms in the United States House of Representatives for Missouri's 7th congressional district. He is the most recent Democrat to serve from that district.

== Early life and education ==
Born in Coweta, Oklahoma, Brown attended public schools in Humansville and Republic, Missouri, and high school in Springfield. He attended Drury College in 1937, 1938 and 1940 and George Washington University in 1939.

== Career before politics ==
After one year as an announcer and writer, Brown was program director of Springfield, Missouri radio station KWTO from 1937 to 1938. He was radio publicity director for the Missouri Conservation Commission in 1940 and later worked for Drury College as public relations director. Brown briefly returned to KWTO in 1942, then worked as an account executive with St. Louis-based Gardner Advertising Company from 1943 to 1945.

In 1945, Brown moved to Nashville and founded Brown Radio Productions; he would serve as president through 1955. Brown also led Brown Brothers Advertising for much of the same time period; it was based in Nashville and St. Louis. He briefly produced The Eddy Arnold Show on ABC-TV in 1956 before resigning in August of that year after he had won the primary election.

== Political career ==
Brown served as delegate to Democratic state and national conventions in 1956, 1960 and 1964. He was elected as a Democrat to the 85th and 86th Congresses (January 3, 1957 – January 3, 1961), but was an unsuccessful candidate for reelection in 1960. Brown voted in favor of the Civil Rights Acts of 1957 and 1960.

== Post-political career ==
He became a public relations consultant in Washington, D.C. and Los Angeles, for organizations including the National Education Association. From 1973 to 1979, he was senior vice president of an oil refining company in Los Angeles. On June 10, 2003, Brown died of emphysema at age 82 in Henderson, Nevada.

== Notes ==
U.S. House of Representatives
| Preceded by Dewey Short | Member of the U.S. House of Representatives from Missouri's 7th congressional district 1957–1961 | Succeeded by Durward G. Hall |
