= Dewey Short =

American politician (1898–1979)

Dewey Jackson Short
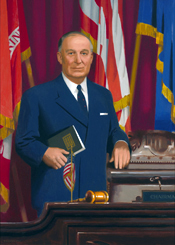

Assistant Secretary of the Army for Civil-Military Affairs
- In office March 15, 1957 – November 1958
- President: Dwight D. Eisenhower
- Preceded by: George H. Roderick
- Succeeded by: Office abolished

Chair of the House Armed Services Committee
- In office January 3, 1953 – January 3, 1955
- Speaker: Joseph William Martin Jr.
- Preceded by: Carl Vinson
- Succeeded by: Carl Vinson

Member of the U.S. House of Representatives from Missouri
- In office March 4, 1929 – March 3, 1931
- Preceded by: James F. Fulbright
- Succeeded by: James F. Fulbright
- Constituency: 14th district
- In office January 3, 1935 – January 3, 1957
- Preceded by: District inactive
- Succeeded by: Charles H. Brown
- Constituency: 7th district

Personal details
- Born: April 7, 1898 Galena, Missouri, U.S.
- Died: November 19, 1979 (aged 81) Washington, D.C., U.S.
- Party: Republican
- Spouse: Helen Gladys Hughes (m. 1937)
- Relations: Pamela Pauly Chinnis (niece)

Dewey Jackson Short (April 7, 1898 – November 19, 1979) was an American politician from Missouri. He was a U.S. representative for 12 terms (1929–1931, 1935–1957). A member of the Republican Party, he was a staunch opponent of President Franklin D. Roosevelt's New Deal.

== Early life ==
Short was born in Galena, Missouri, on April 7, 1898, to Jackson Grant Short and Permelia C. Long. Short graduated Galena High School in 1914 and attended Marionville College.

Short sought further education, graduating from Baker University in 1919 and from Boston University.

While attending Baker University, in 1918, Short entered into a United States Army officer's training camp at Fort Sheridan. He was not old enough to be drafted and his profession as a reverend would have exempted him from being drafted, according to the Selective Service Act of 1917. He had two older brothers who were serving in the Army at that time and he felt obligated to be there with them. He went to the training as a representative of Baker University.

Short also attended Harvard Law School alongside his brother Theodore, Heidelberg University, the University of Berlin, Drew University, and Oxford University. Short also received an honorary Doctor of Law degree from Drury University.

== Career ==
Short began his preaching career at 19 years old, when he received his license to preach from the Methodist Church.

After leaving Harvard Law School, Short became a lecturer and later professor of ethics, psychology, and political philosophy at Southwestern College in Winfield, Kansas. He taught there in 1923–1924, and 1926–1928. Short was a pastor of Grace Methodist Episcopal Church, Springfield, Missouri, in 1927.

He married Helen Gladys Hughes of Washington, DC, on April 20, 1937. The couple had no children.

== Politics ==
Short was elected as a Republican to the Seventy-first Congress (serving March 4, 1929 – March 3, 1931). After the Wall Street crash, he was an unsuccessful candidate for reelection in 1930 to the Seventy-second Congress.

He resumed his former professional pursuits. He served as a delegate to the Republican National Convention in 1932. Short was an unsuccessful candidate in 1932 for nomination to the United States Senate.

In 1934 he was elected to the Seventy-fourth Congress and the ten succeeding Congresses (January 3, 1935 – January 3, 1957). At the 1940 Republican National Convention in Philadelphia, Pennsylvania, Short received 108 delegate votes for the party's vice presidential nomination. He was the runner-up to the eventual nominee, Charles L. McNary, who received votes from 848 delegates.

Short served as chairman of the Committee on Armed Services in the Eighty-third Congress. On April 30, 1955, he was presented with an Honorary Ozark Hillbilly Medallion by the Springfield, Missouri, Chamber of Commerce during a broadcast of ABC-TV's Ozark Jubilee.

External videos
- Dewey Short receiving award on Ozark Jubilee (April 30, 1955)

Short did not sign the 1956 Southern Manifesto, which was an expression of resistance to desegregation of public schools and other facilities. In 1954 the US Supreme Court had ruled that segregated public schools were unconstitutional, in Brown v. Board of Education.

Short was an unsuccessful candidate for reelection in 1956 to the Eighty-fifth Congress. He was defeated by Charles H. Brown; the vote being 90,986 for Brown to 89,926 for Short.

In 1945, he had served as a congressional delegate to inspect concentration camps in Germany. Short was appointed as Assistant Secretary of the Army, serving from March 15, 1957, to January 20, 1961. Later he was President Emeritus of the National Rivers and Harbors Congress.

Short died in Washington, D.C., on November 19, 1979. His body was returned to Missouri, where he was interred in Galena Cemetery, Galena.

In his memoir, In the Arena (1990), former President Richard Nixon cited Short as perhaps the finest orator he had ever seen.

== See also ==
- Assistant Secretary of the Army

U.S. House of Representatives
Preceded by James F. Fulbright	Member of the U.S. House of Representatives from Missouri's 14th congressional district 1929–1931	Succeeded by James F. Fulbright
Preceded by District established	Member of the U.S. House of Representatives from Missouri's 7th congressional district 1935–1957	Succeeded by Charles H. Brown
Government offices
Preceded by George H. Roderick	Assistant Secretary of the Army (Civil-Military Affairs); March 15, 1957 – November 1958	Succeeded by Office abolished
