= Larry Gene Taylor =

American politician

Member of the Missouri Senate from the 29th district
- In office 2004–2005

Member of the Missouri House of Representatives from the 68th district
- In office 2002–2004

Personal details
- Born: August 7, 1953 Carthage, Missouri, U.S.
- Died: July 6, 2005 (aged 51) Joplin, Missouri, U.S.
- Party: Republican
- Spouse: Gay Taylor
- Relations: Gene Taylor (father)
- Children: 3
- Education: Missouri Southern State University

Larry Gene Taylor (August 7, 1953 – July 6, 2005) was an American politician and businessman who served as a member of both chambers of the Missouri General Assembly.

== Early life and education ==
Taylor was born in Carthage, Missouri, the son of Dorothy Taylor and the late Missouri congressman, Gene Taylor. He was a graduate of Sarcoxie High School and went on to Missouri Southern State University.

== Career ==
Taylor was the youngest delegate at the 1972 Republican National Convention. He owned an automobile dealership, Gene Taylor Ford and Sales, and was an automobile and boat wholesaler. He was first elected to the Missouri House of Representatives in 2002 and elected to the Missouri Senate in 2004.

== Personal life ==
He was married to Gay Taylor, and had three children, Charles, Chelsea, and Jaime. He attended the First Baptist Church in Cassville, Missouri, and was an active member of the local Lions International Club. He was a resident of Shell Knob, Missouri. Taylor died in Joplin, Missouri in 2005.
