= Assistant Secretary of the Treasury for Management =

American civil service post

Assistant Secretary of Treasury for Management
- Seal of the United States Department of the Treasury

- Flag of the assistant secretary of the treasury
- Incumbent; Kevin Hennecken since October 2026
- U.S. Department of the Treasury
- Reports to: The U.S. deputy secretary of the treasury
- Seat: Washington, D.C.
- Appointer: The president
- Term length: No fixed term
- Website: www.treasury.gov

The assistant secretary of the treasury for management, chief financial officer, and chief performance officer (ASM/CFO/CPO) is the principal policy advisor to the secretary and deputy secretary on the development and execution of the budget for the Department of the Treasury and the internal management of the department and its bureaus. The ASM/CFO/CPO also oversees department-wide management programs including human resources, information and technology management, financial management and accounting, strategic planning, performance budgeting/metrics, acquisition/procurement, training, human capital and workforce management, equal employment opportunity (EEO), environmental health and safety, emergency preparedness, small business programs, and administrative services for Treasury's headquarters, the departmental offices.

== History ==
The Office of the ASM/CFO has broad responsibilities in the departmental offices and department-wide, exercising management and financial authorities for the secretary and the deputy secretary under various delegations, as well as authorities provided by statute or at the direction of the secretary or deputy secretary. The Chief Financial Officers Act of 1990 mandated the establishment of chief financial officers (CFO) in federal agencies at the assistant secretary level. Historically, the assistant secretary for management is also appointed by the president as the CFO, creating the position of ASM/CFO. The ASM has also been appointed as the chief performance officer for the department.

The ASM is a presidentially appointed position. Until 2012, the position required Senate confirmation. The CFO position continues to require Senate confirmation, but the Senate has not confirmed any nominations for the position since the 2009 confirmation of Dan Tangherlini, and the president has not sent any nominations for the position since 2016. The ASM reports directly to the secretary, through the deputy secretary. Until about 1985, the position was called the assistant secretary for administration but included similar duties, absent CFO duties. As a senior management official in the department, the ASM/CFO has an active role in the oversight of the bureaus. This role is enhanced due to the ASM/CFO’s responsibilities for the department’s budget, as well as department-wide policy.

The responsibilities of the ASM have evolved over the years. In the late 1990s, for example, the ASM/CFO supervised the Mint, the Bureau of Engraving and Printing, and the treasurer of the United States, as well as the Office of Security, which included some of the duties of what would become the Office of Terrorism and Financial Intelligence in 2004. The Office of the ASM/CFO also played a key transition role following the passage of the Homeland Security Act of 2002, when several Treasury bureaus transferred to the Department of Homeland Security and the Justice Department.

== Officeholders ==
Name	In office	Appointed by President	Secretary served under
George Muñoz	1993–1997	William J. Clinton	
Nancy Killefer	1997–1999	William J. Clinton	
Lisa Ross	2000–2001	William J. Clinton	
Edward R. Kingman	2001–2002	George W. Bush	
Teresa Mullet Ressel	Nov 2002 – Feb 2004	George W. Bush	
Sandra L. Pack	Aug 2005 – Dec 2006	George W. Bush	
Peter B. McCarthy	August 2007 – January 20, 2009	George W. Bush	Henry Paulson
Dan Tangherlini	July 2009 – April 2, 2012	Barack Obama	Timothy Geithner
Nani A. Coloretti	November 16, 2012 – December 8, 2014	Barack Obama	Timothy Geithner Jacob J. Lew
Brodi Fontenot	January 2015 – June 2016	Barack Obama	Jacob J. Lew
Kody H. Kinsley	July 2016 – March 2018	Barack Obama	Jacob J. Lew Steven T. Mnuchin
David F. Eisner	April 2018 – January 20, 2021	Donald Trump	Steven T. Mnuchin
Anna Canfield Roth (acting)	August 2022 – February 2023	Joe Biden	Janet Yellen
Anna Canfield Roth	February 2023 – July 2024	Joe Biden	Janet Yellen
Aditi Hardikar (acting)	July 2024 – January 20, 2025	Joe Biden	Janet Yellen
William Sessions (acting)	January 20, 2025 – February 25, 2025	Donald Trump	Scott Bessent
John York	February 25, 2025 – July 2026	Donald Trump	Scott Bessent

|- |Kevin Hennecken |||February 25, 2025 – July 2026 |Donald Trump |Scott Bessent

== See also ==
- Assistant Secretary of the Treasury
