= George H. Roderick =

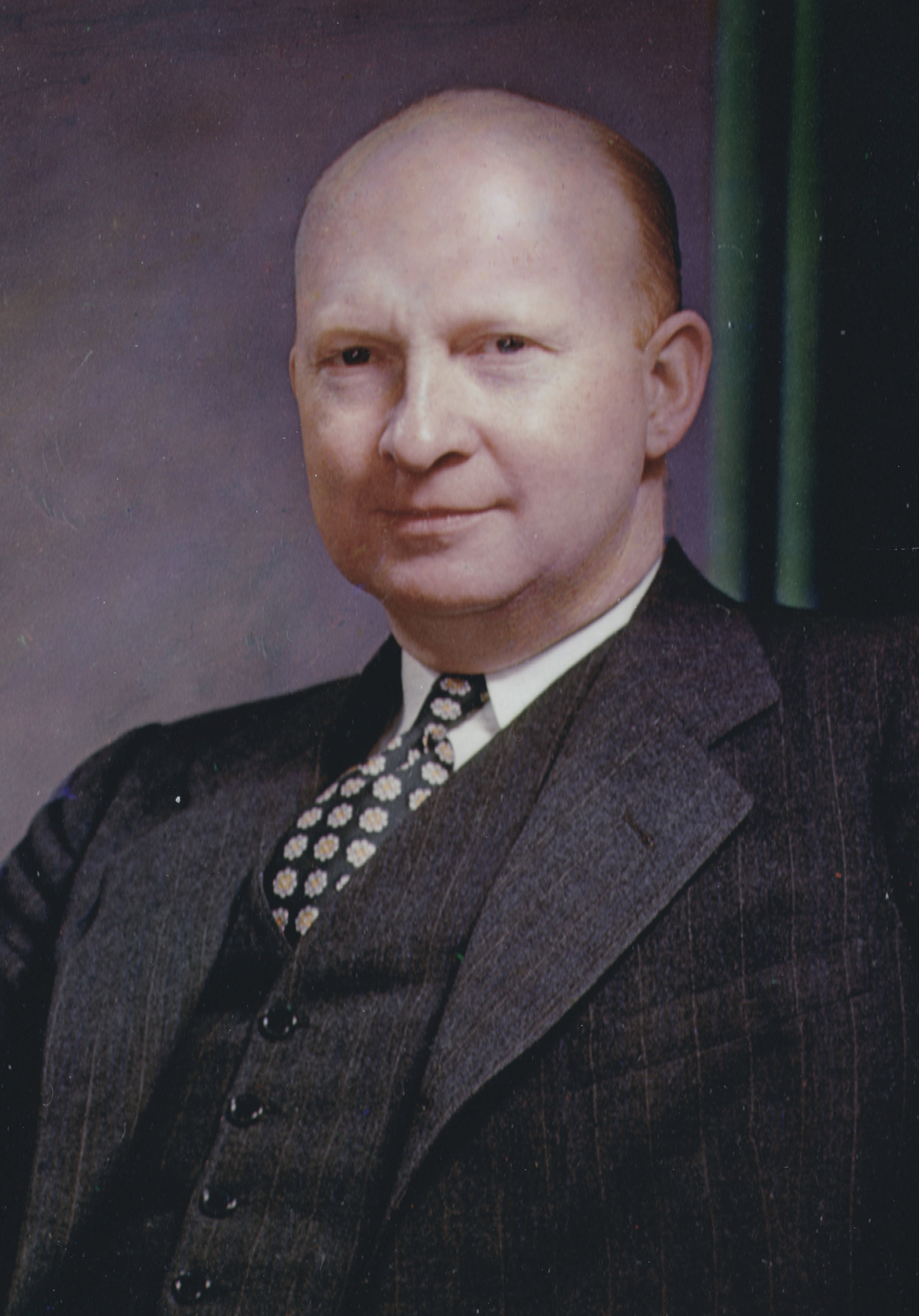
George H. Roderick in 1952.

George H. Roderick (February 22, 1900 – February 19, 1982) was an official in the United States Department of the Army during the Eisenhower Administration.

== Biography ==
Roderick was educated at the University of Michigan, where he wrote the music for the 1920 college musical "George did it".

In the 1950s, Roderick was active in the Rotary Club in Grand Rapids, Michigan.

In 1954, President Dwight D. Eisenhower appointed Roderick Assistant Secretary of the Army (Financial Management and Comptroller), with Roderick serving in this post from February 9, 1954, until August 25, 1954. Eisenhower then named Roderick Assistant Secretary of the Army (Civil-Military Affairs), and Roderick held this office from August 26, 1954, until February 29, 1957. In 1957, Roderick resumed his former office of Assistant Secretary of the Army (Financial Management and Comptroller), holding this office from March 1, 1957, until January 20, 1961.

Government offices
Preceded by New Office	Assistant Secretary of the Army (Financial Management and Comptroller); February 9, 1954 – August 25, 1954	Succeeded by Charles C. Finucane
Preceded by New Office	Assistant Secretary of the Army (Civil-Military Affairs); August 26, 1954 – February 29, 1957	Succeeded by Dewey Jackson Short
Preceded by Chester R. Davis	Assistant Secretary of the Army (Financial Management and Comptroller); March 1, 1957 – January 20, 1961	Succeeded by William F. Schaub
