= Durward G. Hall =

American politician (1910–2001)

Durward Hall
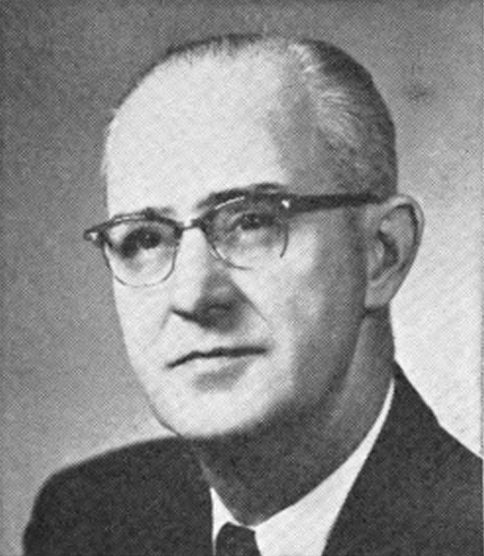

Member of the U.S. House of Representatives from Missouri's 7th district
- In office January 3, 1961 – January 3, 1973
- Preceded by: Charlie Brown
- Succeeded by: Gene Taylor

Personal details
- Born: Durward Gorham Hall; September 14, 1910 Cassville, Missouri, U.S.
- Died: March 15, 2001 (aged 90) Albany, Oregon, U.S.
- Party: Republican
- Education: Missouri State University (AA); Drury University (BA); Rush Medical College (MD)

Durward Gorham Hall (September 14, 1910 – March 15, 2001) was a six-term U.S. representative from Missouri's 7th congressional district.

== Biography ==
He was born in Cassville, Missouri, on September 14, 1910, and graduated from Greenwood Laboratory School at Southwest Missouri State Teacher's College in Springfield, Missouri, in 1926. He received his A.B. at Drury College (now Drury University) in Springfield, Missouri in 1930. Hall went on to medical school at Rush Medical College, then affiliated to the University of Chicago, in Chicago, Illinois, where he received his M.D. in 1934. Dr. Hall served as a physician in the United States Army, Office of the Surgeon General and joined the United States Army Reserve in 1955.

Dr. Hall was elected as a Republican to the 87th United States Congress in 1960. He was re-elected for five more terms serving until January 3, 1973. He was appointed as a delegate to the 1964 Republican National Convention.

During his years in the United States Congress, Dr. Hall's critics referred to him as "Dr. No" because of his tendency to vote no on spending bills. He was a fiscal conservative and a social moderate. Hall voted against the Civil Rights Act of 1964 and the Voting Rights Act of 1965, but in favor of the Civil Rights Act of 1968. Dr. Hall decided to retire from elected politics and was not a candidate for reelection to the 93rd United States Congress in 1972. Gene Taylor, also a Republican, replaced Dr. Hall as the congressman from the 7th District.

He was also the co-founder and a member of board of trustees of the Uniformed Services University of Health Sciences in Bethesda, Maryland, from 1973 to 1981. Dr. Hall served on the faculty of Eckerd College, St. Petersburg, Florida. Dr. Hall spent his retirement years in Springfield, Missouri with his wife. He died on March 15, 2001, in Albany, Oregon. He donated his body to medical science.

U.S. House of Representatives
Preceded by Charlie Brown	Member of the U.S. House of Representatives from Missouri's 7th congressional district 1961–1973	Succeeded by Gene Taylor
