= Nelson M. Ford =

American government official (born 1947)

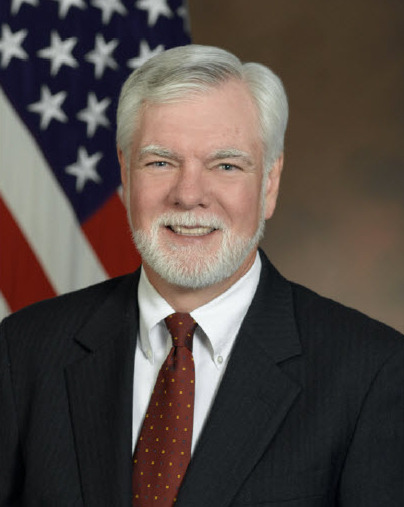

United States Under Secretary of the Army
- In office July 24, 2007 – January 20, 2009
- President: George W. Bush
- Preceded by: Pete Geren
- Succeeded by: Joseph W. Westphal

13th Assistant Secretary of the Army (Financial Management and Comptroller)
- In office September 2006 – December 2007
- President: George W. Bush
- Preceded by: Valerie L. Baldwin
- Succeeded by: Mary Sally Matiella

Personal details
- Born: June 3, 1947 (age 79) Wilmington, Delaware, U.S.
- Education: Duke University; University of Delaware
- Occupation: Executive in Non-profit.

Nelson McCain Ford (born June 3, 1947, in Wilmington, Delaware) was United States Under Secretary of the Army from 2007 to 2009.

== Education ==
Nelson M. Ford was educated at Duke University (B.A. in History) and the University of Delaware (M.Ed.).

== Career ==
In the 1970s, Ford was Executive Secretary of the Health Care Financing Administration and worked in the Office of Management and Budget on health care policy issues. He later joined Coopers & Lybrand and became a consultant to health care companies. In the 1990s, he became Chief Operating Officer of the Georgetown University Medical Center. In 1997, he became president and CEO of Clinipad, a manufacturer of disposable medical products.

Ford joined the United States Department of Defense in 2002 as Deputy Assistant Secretary of Defense (Health Budgets & Financial Policy). In 2005, he became Principal Deputy Assistant Secretary of the Army (Financial Management and Comptroller), and the next year President of the United States George W. Bush named Ford full Assistant Secretary of the Army (Financial Management and Comptroller).

In 2007, President Bush nominated Ford as United States Under Secretary of the Army. Ford held this post until 2009.

Ford worked as President & CEO of LMI, a not-for-profit government consulting firm based in McLean, Va, from 2009 until he retired in June 2017.
