= Tracy Voorhees =

United States Army official

Tracy Stebbins Voorhees
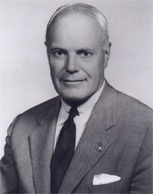
- Under Secretary of the Army (c. 1949)
- Born: June 30, 1890; New Brunswick, New Jersey, U.S.
- Died: September 25, 1974 (aged 84); Brooklyn, New York, U.S.
- Spouse: Josephine Ludlow Palmer
- Military career
- Allegiance: United States of America
- Branch: United States Army
- Service years: 1942–1952
- Rank: Colonel
- Conflicts: World War II
- Awards: Distinguished Service Medal; Department of Defense Award for Distinguished Public Service; Army Distinguished Civilian Service Award
- Other work: Long Island College Hospital, President (1936–1944); Under Secretary of the Army (1949–1950)

Tracy Stebbins Voorhees (June 30, 1890 – September 25, 1974) served as Under Secretary of the United States Army from August 1949 to April 1950. He held numerous positions within the U.S. Government as a civilian. A practicing attorney, Voorhees, with the Judge Advocate General's Department, he served as part of the Surgeon General's office in the European and Pacific theatres during World War II. After the War, he served in various positions in the Defense Department.

== Biography ==
Tracy Voorhees was born on June 30, 1890, in New Brunswick, New Jersey; graduated from Rutgers University with a B.A. degree in 1911 and an M.A. degree in 1914; received an LL.B. degree from Columbia Law School in 1915; was admitted to the New Jersey bar in 1915, and the New York bar in 1918.

He became a member of the law firm of Satterlee, Canfield and Stone in New York in 1917. He served as assistant to the Director, Bureau of Imports, War Trade Board in 1918. He was practicing attorney as a member of the firm of Ewing, Alley and Voorhees from 1919 to 1928 and member of the firm Blake and Voorhees from 1929 to 1942. He served as president of Long Island College Hospital from 1936 to 1944.

He was a commissioned colonel in the United States Army, posted to the Judge Advocate General's Department in 1942 and detailed to the Surgeon General's Office as Director of the Legal Division, serving in the European, China-Burma-India, and Pacific Theaters of Operation. He was special assistant to the Secretary of War Robert P. Patterson in 1946. As a civilian he was special assistant to Secretaries of War Patterson and Kenneth C. Royall, served as the War Department's Food Administrator for Occupied Areas, from 1947–1948 and served as Assistant Secretary of the Army, from 17 June 1948 to 21 August 1949.

He served as Under Secretary of the Army, from 22 August 1949 to 24 April 1950. He was vice chairman of the Committee on Present Danger from 1951 to 1953, Department of Defense Advisor to the U.S. Mission to the North Atlantic Treaty Organization with rank of minister and the director for offshore procurement in Europe for the Secretary of Defense from 1953 to 1954. He was a consultant to the Secretary of Defense from 1954 to 1961, was chairman, President's Committee for Hungarian Refugee Relief from 1956 1957 and served as the President's Personal Representative for Cuban Refugees, from 1960 to 1961. He was vice chairman of the board of Rutgers University from 1959 to 1965. He died in Brooklyn, New York. His papers are preserved in Special Collections and University Archives in the Alexander Library of Rutgers University Libraries in New Brunswick.

== Honors ==
Voorhees' awards include Army Distinguished Service Medal, the Department of Defense Award for Distinguished Public Service, and Army Distinguished Civilian Service Award.

In 1974 the Board of Governors of Rutgers University renamed Rutgers' Neilson Campus in New Brunswick "Voorhees Campus" (currently "Voorhees Mall") after Tracy Voorhees.

The 5.25-acre (21,200 m^{2}) Van Voorhees Park in Brooklyn, New York, is named in honor of Tracy Voorhees and his family.

== See also ==
- Secretary of the Army

== Notes ==
Government offices
| Preceded by Gordon Gray | Assistant Secretary of the Army; June 17, 1948 – August 21, 1949 | Succeeded by Earl D. Johnson |
| Preceded by Gordon Gray | United States Under Secretary of the Army; August 1949 – April 1950 | Succeeded by Archibald S. Alexander |
