= Francis Shackelford =

American lawyer (1909–1973)

Francis Shackelford (September 9, 1909 – November 30, 1973) was the United States General Counsel of the Army from 1950 to 1952 and Assistant Secretary of the Army (General Management) from 1952 to 1953.

== Biography ==
Francis Shackelford was born in Georgia and educated at Princeton University and Harvard Law School. During World War II, he served as an officer in the United States Navy.

In 1950, President of the United States Harry Truman named Shackelford General Counsel of the Army, with Shackelford holding this office from July 24, 1950 until August 25, 1952. On August 26, 1952, he became Assistant Secretary of the Army (General Management), holding this office until January 20, 1953.

Leaving government service in 1953, Shackelford became a Managing Partner of the law firm then called Alston, Miller, Gaines, Spann, and Shackelford. The firm name was later streamlined to Alston, Miller, & Gaines. The firm is now the firm of Alston & Bird. Shackelford loved his career at Alston, Miller & Gaines to the extent that he and his partners eventually dubbed it "The Happy Firm". Shackelford also served as general counsel of Magic Chef, a position he would hold until his death twenty years later. But, his true calling was his tax law work at Alston, Miller & Gaines. And, after all these decades, Alston & Bird is still called "The Happy Firm".

Shackelford was married to the former Renee Marie Fletcher, and was living in Atlanta, Georgia at the time of his death. After Shackelford underwent open heart surgery in Birmingham, Alabama, doctors were unable to revive him, and he died on November 30, 1973.

Government offices
Preceded by Karl Bendetsen	General Counsel of the Army; July 24, 1950 – August 25, 1952	Succeeded by Bernard A. Monaghan
Preceded by Karl Bendetsen	Assistant Secretary of the Army (General Management); August 26, 1952 – January 20, 1953	Succeeded by Office Abolished
