= Gene Taylor (Missouri politician) =

American politician

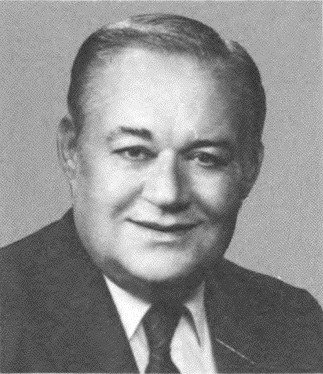

Member of the U.S. House of Representatives from Missouri's 7th district
- In office January 3, 1973 – January 3, 1989
- Preceded by: Durward G. Hall
- Succeeded by: Mel Hancock

Personal details
- Born: February 10, 1928 Sarcoxie, Missouri, U.S.
- Died: October 27, 1998 (aged 70) Springfield, Missouri, U.S.
- Party: Republican
- Relations: Larry Gene Taylor (son)

Gene Taylor (February 10, 1928 – October 27, 1998) was a Republican U.S. representative from Missouri.

He was born near Sarcoxie, Missouri, where Taylor attended local public schools. He attended Southwest Missouri State College, Springfield from 1945 to 1947 then served in the One Hundred and Eighth Cavalry, Missouri National Guard from 1948 to 1949.

From 1954 to 1960, he served as mayor of Sarcoxie, Missouri while starting his automobile dealership which he ran until 1973. He served as a delegate to Republican National Conventions between 1960 and 1968 and as a delegate to Missouri State Republican conventions in 1960, 1964, 1968, and 1972. He was also a Republican national committeeman from 1966 to 1972.

Taylor was first elected to Congress in 1972, defeating future U.S. Attorney General John Ashcroft in the primary, and was subsequently re-elected to the seven succeeding congresses, though he was nearly defeated in 1974 and 1982. He was not a candidate for renomination in 1988 to the 101st Congress. He died on October 27, 1998, in Springfield, Missouri.

The main post office in Springfield, Missouri is named the Gene Taylor Building in the congressman's honor.

U.S. House of Representatives
| Preceded by Durward G. Hall | Member of the U.S. House of Representatives from Missouri's 7th congressional district 1973–1989 | Succeeded by Mel Hancock |
