= Kody H. Kinsley =

American public health official

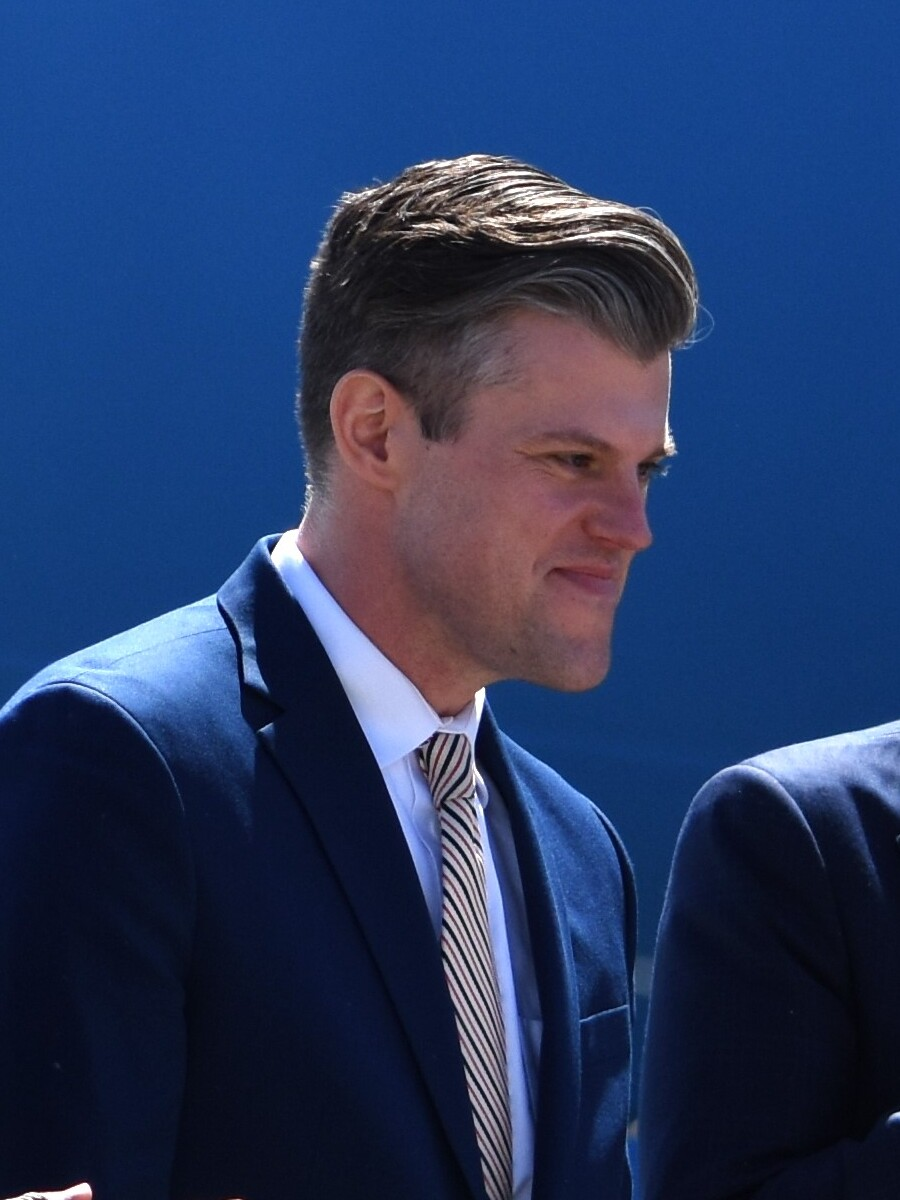
- Kinsley in 2024

Secretary of the North Carolina Department of Health and Human Services
- In office January 1, 2022 – January 12, 2025
- Governor: Roy Cooper
- Preceded by: Mandy Cohen
- Succeeded by: Devdutta Sangvai

Assistant Secretary of the Treasury for Management
- In office July 2016 – March 2018
- President: Barack Obama; Donald Trump
- Preceded by: Brodi Fontenot
- Succeeded by: David F. Eisner

Personal details
- Born: July 3, 1985 (age 41) Wilmington, North Carolina, U.S.
- Party: Democratic Party (United States)
- Education: Brevard College (BS); University of California, Berkeley (MPP)

Kody H. Kinsley (born July 3, 1985) is an American public servant and health policy official who served as Secretary of the North Carolina Department of Health and Human Services from 2022 to 2025. He was the first openly gay cabinet secretary in North Carolina history. Earlier, he was Assistant Secretary of the Treasury for Management under presidents Barack Obama and Donald Trump. He is a senior policy advisor at the Institute for Policy Solutions at the Johns Hopkins School of Nursing and a visiting senior fellow at The Century Foundation.

As secretary, Kinsley oversaw the launch of Medicaid expansion in December 2023, which enrolled more than 600,000 people in its first year, and led negotiations with the state's hospitals on a medical debt relief program, reported to be the first of its kind in the nation, that erased more than $6.5 billion in medical debt for about 2.5 million North Carolinians. He also negotiated an $835 million investment in behavioral health services with the Republican-led General Assembly. Before becoming secretary, he was the department's chief deputy secretary for health and led operations for the state's COVID-19 response. Since leaving office, he has written and commented on state and federal Medicaid policy.

== Early life and education ==
Kinsley is from Wilmington, North Carolina. He grew up in a working-class family without health insurance; his father worked in construction and his mother cleaned houses. He was the first in his family to graduate from college, attending Brevard College on Pell Grants and earning a Bachelor of Arts in health science studies. During his second year of college, his father had a severe stroke; Kinsley negotiated a discount on the hospital bill for his uninsured family, an experience he later cited in his work on medical debt. He earned a Master of Public Policy from the Goldman School of Public Policy at the University of California, Berkeley.

== Career ==
=== Early Career and Federal Service ===
After graduating from Brevard College, Kinsley worked in operations for a behavioral health care provider in western North Carolina. He began his federal career in 2011 as a program analyst in the Office of the National Coordinator for Health Information Technology at the U.S. Department of Health and Human Services. From 2012 to 2015, he held several positions at the U.S. Department of the Treasury, including senior advisor to the Assistant Secretary for Management. From 2013 to 2014, he was detailed to the White House Domestic Policy Council as a policy analyst. He was director of policy and program support at the District of Columbia Department of Human Services from 2015 to 2016, then returned to Treasury as a counselor in its Office of Management.

=== U.S. Department of the Treasury ===
==== Assistant Secretary of the Treasury for Management (2016–2018) ====
In 2016, President Barack Obama appointed Kinsley to serve as Assistant Secretary of the Treasury for Management. The News & Observer described the post as spanning a department of about 100,000 employees and a $15.5 billion budget, and Duke University's Wilson Center for Science and Justice describes him as having functioned as Treasury's chief operating officer and chief financial officer. He was also the department's chief Freedom of Information Act officer. He continued in this role into President Donald Trump's administration. Government Executive listed him among the Obama-era officials kept on as the Trump administration took office. His tenure ended in March 2018.

=== North Carolina Department of Health and Human Services (2018–2021) ===
Kinsley returned to North Carolina in March 2018 as the department's Deputy Secretary for Behavioral Health and Intellectual and Developmental Disabilities. In that role, he oversaw the state's four psychiatric hospitals and ten other state-operated facilities and led its response to the opioid epidemic. In January 2020, he testified before the U.S. House Energy and Commerce Subcommittee on Oversight and Investigations on how North Carolina was using federal funds to address the epidemic. In April 2021, he was promoted to Chief Deputy Secretary for Health, overseeing the divisions of Mental Health, Developmental Disabilities and Substance Abuse Services; State Operated Healthcare Facilities; Public Health; and Health Service Regulation. From March 2020, Kinsley was operations lead for North Carolina's COVID-19 response, with responsibilities including testing, contact tracing, personal protective equipment and vaccine administration. North Carolina Health News later wrote that he played a key role in coordinating the state's testing and vaccination efforts. Republican state senator Jim Burgin said Kinsley had helped fix early problems with the state's vaccine rollout.

=== Secretary of North Carolina Department of Health and Human Services ===
Governor Roy Cooper appointed Kinsley health secretary of the NCDHHS, an organization with nearly 18,000 employees and an annual budget of $38 billion. He was unanimously confirmed by the North Carolina Senate on June 29, 2022. He was sworn in on January 1, 2022, by North Carolina Court of Appeals judge Lucy Inman outside the department's headquarters on the Dorothea Dix campus in Raleigh. At his Senate confirmation hearing in June 2022, Kinsley urged lawmakers to adopt Medicaid expansion, which the Republican-controlled Senate had blocked for years. North Carolina Health News reported that he worked closely with Republican legislators; he and Republican state senator Jim Burgin attended more than a dozen mental health town halls together. Axios and The Assembly described him as "North Carolina Republicans' favorite Democrat," citing his relationships with Republican legislators during the expansion negotiations. Republican state representative Donny Lambeth, a longtime supporter of expansion, said it would likely have passed eventually but probably not in 2023 without Kinsley's involvement.

During his tenure, Kinsley led the state's expansion of Medicaid, brokered a deal that relieved nearly $6.5 billion in medical debt, raised charity care standards, and secured $835 million in new behavioral health funding. His tenure ended on January 12, 2025. He was succeeded by Devdutta Sangvai.

==== Medicaid Expansion and Healthcare Access ====
Kinsley led the expansion of Medicaid in North Carolina. This effort, aimed at extending healthcare access to more than 600,000 uninsured residents, involved extensive collaboration with state legislators and healthcare stakeholders. The expansion reduced barriers to care and improved health outcomes for vulnerable populations. The state reached its two-year enrollment goal of 600,000 in just over a year.

Kinsley emphasized the importance of Medicaid expansion in tackling health disparities, particularly in rural communities where access to healthcare services is limited. Kinsley's work as secretary broadened insurance coverage and enhanced investments in both preventive care and behavioral health services.

By December 2025, two years after implementation, more than 690,000 newly eligible North Carolinians had obtained coverage through Medicaid expansion. According to the North Carolina Department of Health and Human Services, more than 244,500 of the new enrollees lived in rural communities. The department also reported that newly eligible beneficiaries had filled more than 11 million prescriptions and that more than 191,000 had received dental services since the expansion began in December 2023.

The expansion law was enacted in March 2023, but its start was tied to the passage of a state budget, which was delayed until September. Coverage began on December 1, 2023, when about 300,000 people enrolled in Medicaid's limited family planning program were automatically moved into full coverage.

==== Medical Debt Relief ====
In 2024, Kinsley negotiated with the federal government and North Carolina's hospitals to create the Medical Debt Relief and Reform Incentive Program, which tied enhanced Medicaid payments under the Healthcare Access and Stabilization Program to hospitals' relief of patients' medical debt. Federal regulators approved the arrangement in July 2024. To develop the proposal, Kinsley and his aides first tested possible policies with a handful of hospital systems, including UNC Health. Participating hospitals agreed to cancel qualifying medical debt dating back to 2014, automatically discount care for patients who qualify for financial assistance, and stop reporting medical debt to credit agencies. Despite pushback from hospitals and industry groups, all 99 eligible acute care hospitals agreed to participate by the August 2024 deadline. NPR later described Kinsley as the official who organized the effort, drawing hospitals in by tying additional Medicaid dollars to participation.

In October 2025, Governor Josh Stein announced that the program had eliminated more than $6.5 billion in medical debt for over 2.5 million North Carolinians, exceeding initial projections of approximately $4 billion in relief for 2 million residents. The Associated Press reported that the initiative affected nearly one-quarter of the state's population. The results included additional debt forgiven by hospitals beyond the program's minimum requirements. North Carolina's approach differed from medical debt relief programs that purchase outstanding debt using public or charitable funds. Instead, it conditioned enhanced Medicaid hospital payments on debt forgiveness and changes to hospital financial assistance practices. A 2026 analysis published in Health Affairs Scholar identified North Carolina as a notable exception among state and local medical debt relief initiatives, accounting for approximately 48 percent of the medical debt eliminated nationally through such programs.

North Carolina Health News reported that the program appeared to be the first of its kind in the nation. In October 2024, Kinsley outlined its design for policymakers in other states in Health Affairs. That December, the department published a toolkit to help other states create similar programs, and Cooper said governors of other states had asked how North Carolina had done it.

==== Healthy Opportunities Pilots ====
During Kinsley's tenure as secretary, North Carolina implemented the Healthy Opportunities Pilots, a Medicaid demonstration program evaluating whether providing nonmedical services could improve health outcomes and reduce healthcare spending. The program began providing services in March 2022 and funded interventions involving food assistance, housing, transportation, and interpersonal safety. It operated in selected regions of the state and served Medicaid beneficiaries with qualifying health conditions and social needs. A peer-reviewed study published in JAMA in February 2025 examined the program's association with Medicaid spending and healthcare utilization. Researchers found that healthcare spending initially increased following enrollment but subsequently declined relative to expected spending without participation. The findings suggested that interventions addressing health-related social needs could contribute to lower healthcare spending over time.

A subsequent evaluation conducted by the University of North Carolina at Chapel Hill's Cecil G. Sheps Center for Health Services Research examined more than 31,000 participants enrolled between March 2022 and November 2024. Released in June 2026, the evaluation estimated that the program reduced Medicaid healthcare spending by an average of $164 per beneficiary per month and was associated with fewer emergency department visits and hospital admissions. The program suspended operations after state funding ended in July 2025. The North Carolina General Assembly subsequently approved $9 million in state funding for fiscal year 2027 to support a limited restart of services.

==== Behavioral Health Funding ====
North Carolina received $1.8 billion in "incentive payments" for expanding Medicaid as part of the American Rescue Plan. Kinsley led negotiations with the Republican-led legislature to leverage this new funding for behavioral health, resulting in an $835 million investment in behavioral health care. This funding increased reimbursement rates for behavioral health services, including the first Medicaid reimbursement-rate increases for behavioral health providers since 2012, enhanced crisis intervention systems, bolstered behavioral health services in schools, and expanded care for people involved with the justice system.

==== LGBTQ+ Health ====
Kinsley led a coalition of state health secretaries to call on the U.S. Food and Drug Administration to update blood donation rules to allow sexually active gay and bisexual men to donate blood. He donated blood in August 2023 after the FDA rules were changed and the American Red Cross updated their processes.

He also led the state's efforts during the 2022-2023 mpox outbreak, which disproportionately affected the LGBTQ+ community. He publicly pushed for a more coordinated response to the epidemic.

==== Hurricane Helene Relief ====
After Hurricane Helene struck western North Carolina in September 2024, the department adopted temporary Medicaid flexibilities for affected enrollees and providers and opened Disaster SNAP food assistance to residents of 25 counties and the Eastern Band of Cherokee Indians.

=== Post-secretary Career ===
Following his departure as North Carolina Secretary of Health and Human Services in January 2025, Kinsley joined the Institute for Policy Solutions at the Johns Hopkins School of Nursing as a senior policy advisor. The institute announced his appointment in 2025, citing his experience in state and federal health policy and Medicaid expansion. Kinsley also served as a senior advisor to FasterCures, a center of the Milken Institute. He is also a senior consultant at the Duke-Margolis Institute for Health Policy.

In November 2025, he co-authored a report with June Cha examining opportunities to expand preventive healthcare through Medicare and Medicaid. The report addressed benefit design, payment policy, and approaches to improving access to preventive services.

In March 2026, The Century Foundation appointed Kinsley a visiting senior fellow in its Health Reform Initiative. The appointment was part of the foundation's expansion of its work on healthcare affordability and economic policy. Kinsley also assumed nonprofit and civic leadership roles. In July 2026, the Dix Park Conservancy named him vice chair of its board of directors, alongside former Raleigh mayor Nancy McFarlane, who became board chair.

Kinsley also serves on the board of the charitable arm of Healthier United, a nonpartisan public health nonprofit founded as Healthier Colorado, which he joined in March 2026. In May 2026, he joined the Board of Advisors of the University of North Carolina at Chapel Hill School of Social Work for a term running through 2029, after delivering the school's commencement address. He also serves on the board of directors of the Milbank Memorial Fund and the advisory board of Duke University School of Law's Wilson Center for Science and Justice. Kinsley is a fellow of the Aspen Institute's Civil Society Fellowship and has taught as an adjunct instructor in the Master of Public Administration program at the UNC School of Government.

Since leaving office, Kinsley has written on Medicaid and nonmedical drivers of health. In July 2026, he co-authored a report, published by the Milbank Memorial Fund with the Duke-Margolis Institute for Health Policy, on the experiences of participants in the Healthy Opportunities Pilots. In August 2026, he and Mandy Cohen wrote an opinion piece in STAT arguing that the pilots' approach should be adopted nationally. In September 2026, he co-wrote an opinion piece in The Milbank Quarterly with Jeanne Lambrew and Doug Scaffidi calling for policymakers to consider federalizing state Medicaid payments for Medicare premiums and cost sharing. In November 2026, he was one of nine former state health and human services chiefs who co-wrote an open letter, published by the Milbank Memorial Fund, offering incoming governors' transition teams state-level options for improving health care affordability, operational efficiency and access to care.

== Awards ==
During his federal government career, Kinsley received the Alexander Hamilton Award from the United States Department of the Treasury, the department's highest honor.

The State Employees Association of North Carolina (SEANC) awarded Kinsley the inaugural Unsung Hero Award in July 2020. The association said it recognized Kinsley because he prioritized the safety of employees during the COVID-19 pandemic, maintained clear and frequent communication with staff, and ensured employee concerns were integral to the decision-making process.

Kinsley received the MPP Distinguished Award from the Goldman School of Public Policy at the University of California, Berkeley. The school celebrated Kinsley for his leadership in public health and his role in advancing Medicaid expansion and mental health funding in North Carolina. The award was presented at the Alumni Awards Banquet on September 13, 2024.

The North Carolina Council on Developmental Disabilities (NCCDD) gave Kinsley its first-ever Kerri Eaker Mountain Mover Award in November 2024. The award, celebrating the legacy of Kerri Eaker, is given to individuals who have driven transformative systems change for the state's intellectual and developmental disabilities (I/DD) community.

In 2025, Omicron Delta Kappa, the national leadership honor society, awarded Kinsley its Pillar of Leadership Award for Service to Campus and Community. Established in 2014, the Pillar of Leadership Awards recognize achievement in five areas of campus and community leadership.

Also in 2025, the North Carolina Justice Center named Kinsley a Defender of Justice in the category of Policy, Research, and Advocacy. The center presents the awards to recognize individuals and organizations working to advance economic and social justice in North Carolina.

In February 2026, Kinsley received the William C. Friday Award from North Carolina State University's Park Scholarships program. Established in 2000 and named for former University of North Carolina system president William C. Friday, the award recognizes individuals who exemplify scholarship, leadership, service, and character.

== Personal life ==
Kinsley is openly gay and has been a vocal advocate for LGBTQ+ rights and inclusion.
