= William F. Schaub =

William Fulton Schaub (5 May 1899 – 1 May 1999) was an American Army civilian who served as the United States Assistant Secretary of the Army (Financial Management and Comptroller) from 1961 to 1962.

== Biography ==
A native of Sandusky, Ohio, Schaub served in the United States Army for a short time at the end of World War I, and then attended the University of Pennsylvania. After college, he worked in real estate in Florida and Ohio, and then managed a bus company in Connecticut.

In the 1930s, Schaub worked for the Works Progress Administration, first in his hometown of Sandusky, Ohio, then in Washington, D.C. During World War II, he worked for the U.S. Bureau of the Budget as an administrator for defense budgets. He then remained at the Bureau of the Budget after the war.

President of the United States John F. Kennedy nominated Schaub to be Assistant Secretary of the Army (Financial Management and Comptroller). After Senate confirmation, he served in this office from March 2, 1961 to December 31, 1962.

Schaub married twice: his first wife, Kathryn Coffee Schaub died in the 1970s, and he then married Betty Richards Schaub in the 1980s.

Schaub died of heart failure at a retirement home in Wilsonville, Oregon, four days shy of his 100th birthday.

Government offices
Preceded by George H. Roderick	Assistant Secretary of the Army (Financial Management and Comptroller); March 2, 1961 – December 31, 1962	Succeeded by Edmund T. Pratt, Jr.
