= Edmund T. Pratt Jr. =

American businessman (1927–2002)

Edmund Taylor Pratt Jr.
- Born: 1927; Savannah, Georgia
- Died: September 5, 2002 (aged 74–75); New York, New York
- Education: Duke University (BS); University of Pennsylvania (MBA)
- Occupations: Chairman and CEO of Pfizer

Edmund T. Pratt Jr. (1927 - September 5, 2002) was the Chairman and CEO of Pfizer Inc. He served as President from 1971 to 1972, CEO from 1972 to 1991, and Chairman from 1972 to 1992. He is the namesake of the Duke University Pratt School of Engineering.

== Early life ==
Pratt was born in Savannah, Georgia in 1927 and grew up in Elkton, Maryland. His father worked for the Army Corps of Engineers He graduated from Duke University in 1947 magna cum laude with a bachelor of science in electrical engineering. He also obtained an MBA from University of Pennsylvania's Wharton School of Business in 1949.

== Career ==
Pratt began his career at IBM in 1949. His time at IBM was interrupted for two years when he served with the Navy as a lieutenant during the Korean War. Afterwards, he returned to IBM in 1952, eventually serving as controller of IBM World Trade Corporation from 1958 to 1962. Pratt then joined the Kennedy Administration as assistant secretary of the Army for Financial Management.

After leaving the government in 1964, Pratt joined Pfizer as controller. In 1969, he became chairman and president of Pfizer International. In 1971, he was elected president of Pfizer, and in 1972 he succeeded John Powers, Jr. as chairman and CEO.

During Pratt's two decades at the helm, Pfizer evolved into one of the fastest-growing pharmaceutical companies in the United States. Pratt expanded research and development facilities worldwide, acquired Howmedica and other medical device companies, and introduced of products like Procardia, Feldene, Diflucan, and Norvasc. Under his leadership, annual revenue increased sevenfold, from $1 billion to nearly $7 billion.

Pratt's earlier government service in Washington stood him in good stead as the Company grew and played a greater role in national and international matters. As advisor to United States Trade Representative Bill Brock in the mid-1980s, he played an instrumental role encouraging private sector involvement in trade matters. As chairman of the presidentially appointed Advisory Committee for Trade Negotiations, he also broadened the trade agenda to include items of global impact, including the issue of intellectual property as a result of Pfizer's diminishing returns. In his own words "We were beginning to notice that we were losing market share [in developing countries] because our intellectual property rights were not being respected in these countries" A member of the IPC trade delegation in the Punta del Este round of the GATT trade talks in 1986, he pushed hard for the creation of a commercially beneficial system of worldwide IP rights.

Pratt served as chairman of the Business Council of New York State, The Business Round Table, and the President's Advisory Committee for Trade Negotiations. On March 1, 1992, Pratt retired as chairman and continued his involvement with the Company as a director of the board until 1997.

During his tenure as head of Pfizer, Ed Pratt was instrumental in the creation of low-income housing around Pfizer's Brooklyn plant, the donation of a Pfizer building for a public charter school, and the economic development and improvements in neighborhood safety. He also held leadership positions in organizations such as the United Way, the Boys Clubs of America, and the Girl Scouts of the USA. He made significant contributions to Long Island University, in 1998, to fund academic, computer, and library facilities and, in 1999, to Duke University which created the Pratt School of Engineering.

== Personal ==
Pratt was inducted into the Junior Achievement U.S. Business Hall of Fame in 1999. In 1987, he received The Hundred Year Association of New York's Gold Medal Award "in recognition of outstanding contributions to the City of New York."

A magna cum laude graduate of Duke - who relied on a U.S. Navy scholarship to fund his education - Pratt donated $35 million to the university in 1999.

Pratt died of cancer on September 5, 2002, at the age of 75.

He was married to Nancy Rhodes Pratt and had two sons, Randolph and Keith.

Government offices
Preceded by William F. Schaub	Assistant Secretary of the Army (Financial Management and Comptroller); March 23, 1963 – November 25, 1964	Succeeded by ???
