= Karl Bendetsen =

American military officer (1907–1989)

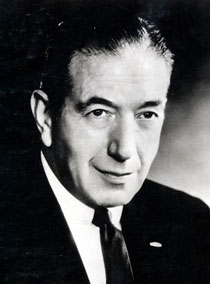

United States Under Secretary of the Army
- In office May 1952 – October 1952
- President: Harry S. Truman
- Preceded by: Archibald S. Alexander
- Succeeded by: Earl D. Johnson

Personal details
- Born: October 11, 1907
- Died: June 28, 1989 (aged 81)
- Known for: Internment of Japanese Americans

Military service
- Allegiance: United States
- Branch/service: United States Army
- Years of service: 1940–1945
- Rank: Colonel
- Unit: Washington Army National Guard

Karl Robin Bendetsen (October 11, 1907 – June 28, 1989) was an American politician and military officer who served in the Washington Army National Guard during World War II and later as the United States Under Secretary of the Army. Bendetsen is remembered primarily for his role as an architect of the internment of Japanese Americans during World War II, a role he tried to downplay in later years.

== Early life ==
Karl Bendetsen was born into a Lithuanian Jewish family in Aberdeen, Washington. His parents, Albert M. and Anna Bendetson, were first-generation American citizens. Karl changed the spelling of his last name during early 1942, and would later make written claims to descent from Danish lumbermen who had come to America as early as 1670.

== Military career ==
=== Prior to World War II ===
Bendetson (as he was then known) enlisted in the 248th Coast Artillery Battalion of the Washington National Guard, at the age of fourteen. While this was well below the legal age, the National Guard turned a blind eye to the many young men who desired to enlist while who were still in—or, as in Bendetsen's case, had yet to enter—high school.

As he matured, Karl studied at Stanford University and participated in the Reserve Officers Training Corps, accepting a commission in the Officers Reserve Corps in 1929. He was ordered to active duty in 1940.

=== 1941 ===
Bendetson, now a major, was on the administrative staff of Judge Advocate General Major General Allen W. Guillion, in the Wartime Civil Control Administration.

In early September 1941, Bendetson was sent to Hawaii to discuss the need to intern enemy aliens in case of war. He stated in his notes that there were 134,000 American citizens of Japanese descent in the islands, and worried that "good Americans" might "give Japs the benefit of the doubt" for economic reasons.

In November, Bendetson was sent to take over an aircraft plant in New Jersey, as part of a plan by President Franklin D. Roosevelt to boost production of factories making materiel needed by Great Britain.

Major Bendetson was given this assignment after having written the orders for seizure and strike-breaking at a North American Aviation plant, but the army had taken charge of the Air Associates plant in October, prior to his arrival. In later years, however, Bendetsen would describe a wild scene of standing on his overturned car to face down the "mass" of strikers who had blocked his way into the plant.

The strike settled, Bendetson was back at his own desk in early December.

== Internment of Japanese Americans ==
Immediately following the Japanese attack on Pearl Harbor on December 7, 1941, the Federal Bureau of Investigation arrested approximately 5,500 leaders in the Japanese American communities in Alaska, Washington, Oregon, California, and Hawaii. While the government was worried that these leaders had been involved in anti-American activity on behalf of the Empire of Japan, eventually, all were cleared of any wrongdoing.

However, President Roosevelt signed Executive Order 9066 in early 1942, which authorized military commanders to designate "exclusion zones", "from which any or all persons may be excluded" for reasons of military security. Following that authorization, Bendetsen (he had changed his name by this time) developed a plan by which all persons of Japanese ancestry, whether foreign-born or American-born, were forcibly interned in concentration camps. He then pressured Lieutenant General John L. DeWitt to accept his plan, rather than the less-restrictive one which DeWitt had originally intended.

Initially, only southern Arizona and the western parts of Washington, Oregon and California were designated as "Military Area No. 1," and many Japanese Americans simply moved to the eastern portions of their home states, while several thousand moved to other states. Bendetsen would later call this "voluntary relocation," though the moves were done at the orders of the government. The Western Defense Command then announced that the exclusion zone would be expanded to include all of California and created "Military Area No. 2," at the same time prohibiting Japanese Americans from leaving either military area. Only those who had moved outside California escaped being rounded up and confined in makeshift "assembly centers" (often horse stalls at racetracks and fairgrounds), and then later incarceration in "relocation centers."

While Bendetsen and other supporters of internment cited military necessity (and continue to do so), reports by the FBI and by the Office of Naval Intelligence had stated that not only were vast majority of Americans of Japanese ancestry loyal, but likewise their parents (who had been denied American citizenship) were loyal to the United States and held no allegiance to Japan.

Bendetsen also ordered that any person, no matter their age, who had "one drop of Japanese blood" were to be confined. This included the removal of infants and children from orphanages and the transportation of hospital patients, a number of whom died when their care was cut off. He would later claim that the orders were not so broad-sweeping, though even Military Intelligence Service officers of Japanese ancestry were forced to leave California.

Throughout the rest of the war, Bendetsen and DeWitt opposed army orders that soldiers of Japanese ancestry be allowed to re-enter the coastal states while on leave or military assignment. The reason for opposition was primarily political along with the fear of ridicule because the soldiers had proven patriotic Americans while the government had spent millions of dollars to put those soldiers' families behind barbed wire.

== Opposition to Japanese American redress ==
Bendetsen joined others who had been involved in the exclusion and incarceration to oppose the Commission on Wartime Relocation and Internment of Civilians hearings, which in 1983 determined that there had been no just cause for the actions taken against Japanese American communities during World War II. He was adamantly opposed to calls for reparations to be paid to former camp inmates and their relatives.

=== Pearl Harbor ===
When interviewed in 1972 for the Harry S. Truman library. Speaking to historian Jerry Hess, Bendetsen claimed to have spent "late 1941" carrying "the title of Special Representative of the Secretary of War" to have conferences with Major General Douglas MacArthur in the Philippines. He also claimed to have stopped to meet with Lieutenant General Walter C. Short (the military commander in charge of Hawaiian defenses) and Rear Admiral Husband E. Kimmel (commander of the Pacific Fleet), leaving only days before the Pearl Harbor attacks.

In this oral history, Bendetsen tells in great detail that the United Airlines plane returning him from Hawaii had landed in Washington at 9 a.m. on December 7, with Bendetsen carrying "a personal and important message" from General Short to Army Chief of Staff George C. Marshall. Bendetsen claims he had been told that Marshall was out riding his horse, "so why don't you go home, kiss your wife ... be here by 10 a.m." Then, Bendetsen continues, upon reaching the house an urgent phone call summoned him back to the office and he was told of the Pearl Harbor attacks "twenty minutes later."

Bendetson also served in the ETO late in the war in the Control Division of the Army Service Forces, European Theater, under COL Charles R. Broshous. In the latter's oral history searchable at the Eisenhower Library, Bendetson was sent over in Spring 1945 to aid in the work of minimizing shipment of new materiel to the ETO in order to maximize shipments to GEN MacArthur in the PTO. Bendetson worked with Mark Cresap, later a successful Westinghouse executive in Pittsburgh, on predicting an end-date for combat in the ETO; they were off by one day. But they turned away as many as 80 Liberty Ship-loads that could then be redirected to the Pacific. When combat in Germany ended, they worked on the packing, loading and shipping of ordnance and supplies that could be used in the PTO.

=== Family histories ===
Bendetsen's grandparents had emigrated from Lithuania and Poland in the 1860s. His father was born in New York, and was co-owner of a clothing store. However:

- In early 1942, Karl changed the spelling of his name from "Bendetson" to "Bendetsen."
- In 1970, Bendetsen claimed (for the National Cyclopedia of American Biography) that he was "grandson of Benedict and Dora Robbins Bendetsen, and great-grandson of Benedict Benediktssen, who came to this country from Denmark about 1815 ..." In truth, Bendetsen's paternal grandparents were Samuel A. and Katherine Rabbin Bendetson, who were born in Germany (1830) and Poland (1838), respectively.
- In 1983, he took time from testifying in opposition to redress for Japanese American internment camp survivors to describe how his first Danish ancestor "came over here in 1670, decided he didn't want to be a sailor, he wanted to be a farmer ... my family has been in timber ever since." He also described selling lumber to Japanese ships. In truth, Bendetsen's family first entered the "timber" business after he retired from the army, when he became a general consultant for the Champion Paper & Fibre Company in 1952. Rising to company president (the reason for the Biography entry in 1970), Karl was described as "ruthless" by his lifelong friends, who also were critical of his betrayal of his Jewish heritage.

== See also ==
- John L. DeWitt

== Bibliography ==
Books

- de Nevers, Klancy Clark (2004). The Colonel and the Pacifist. Salt Lake City, Utah: University of Utah Press. ISBN 978-0874807899.
- Weglyn, Michi Nishiura (1976). Years of Infamy: The Untold Story of America's Concentration Camps. New York: William Morrow & Company. ISBN 978-0688079963.

Interviews

- Hess, Jerry N. (October–November 1972). "Oral History Interviews with Karl R. Bendetsen". Harry S. Truman Library & Museum. Archived from the original on 18 August 2000.

External links

- "Preliminary Inventory of the Karl R. Bendetsen papers, 1917-1989". Online Archive of California. Hoover Institution. Selected documents from the Bendetsen Papers online at the Hoover Institution Archives, Stanford University.
- "Local Service Center For Japanese Opened: Office Will Aid Evacuees: Property Deals Will be Guided". Lodi News-Sentinel. 26 March 1942.
- Johnston, Richard W. (1 April 1942). "Outline Program for Relocating Japanese". Berkeley Daily Gazette. UP.
- "Acquire New Alien Camps". Berkeley Daily Gazette. UP. 1 April 1942.
- "Japanese Evacuation Expected Soon: Personal Property Being Transferred: Assembly Center At Fair Grounds Expected To Be Complete This Week". Lodi News-Sentinel. 14 April 1942.
- "Japanese Centers Claimed Adequate". Prescott Evening Courier. 15 April 1942.
- "Army Was Prepared". Spokane Daily Chronicle. AP. 21 May 1942.
- "The Japs Move Into Temporary Quarters". The Deseret News. 27 May 1942.
- "Army Completes Big Japanese Evacuation". Beaver County Times. United Press. 6 June 1942.
- "100,000 Japanese Safely Evacuated: Not One Instance Of One Japanese Reporting Disloyalty Of Another". Lodi News-Sentinel. 9 June 1942.
- "All Coast Japs Are Evacuated". Eugene Register-Guard. 9 June 1942. "'Contrary to other national or race groups' Colonel Karl R. Bendetsen, assistant chief of staff, Western Defense Command and Fourth Army, who was in direct charge of the evacuation operation, told the Commonwealth club of San Francisco, 'the behavior of the Japanese has been such that in not one single instance has any Japanese reported disloyalty on the part of another specific individual of the same race .... I think that this attitude may be, and can be, a most ominous thing.'"
- "Will Move Japs to Tule Lake Project: Movement From Sacramento to Start Monday, Marysville to Follow". Lodi News-Sentinel. 13 June 1942.
- "Army Will Evacuate Japanese at Turlock". Berkeley Daily Gazette. 17 July 1942.
- "Japanese Centers To Be Moved Inland". The Pittsburgh Press. United Press. 12 September 1942.
- "Award Bendetsen Army Decoration". Berkeley Daily Gazette. 19 November 1942.
- Allen, Robert S. (26 September 1949). "Robert S. Allen Reports: MacArthur Wants Naval Strength In Pacific". The Evening Independent. "BURNT FINGERS: The White House is getting leery about sending controversial appointees to defense jobs to the senate. That is the inside reason for the delay on Kar Bendetsen, San Francisco lawyer, as assistant secretary of the army. Three powerful groups have voiced strong criticism of him. They are the Japanese American Citizens League, the National Association for the Advancement of Colored People, and the American Jewish Congress. Reason for their opposition is Bendetsen's connection with the eviction of Japanese-Americans from the West coast during the war. He was General John DeWitt's legal adviser in this action.
  Bendetsen's strongest supporters are Senator William Knowland (R.-Calif.), and the Native Sons of the Golden West."
- Pearson, Drew (3 February 1950). "Drew Pearson's Washington Merry-Go-Round". The Southeast Missourian. "WEST COAST FRENZY
  A letter from a Catholic priest may stop Senate confirmation of Karl R. Bendetsen of Aberdeen, Wash., sworn in Thursday as assistant secretary of the Army. The letter tells the story of Bendetsen when he was in charge of evacuating persons of Japanese ancestry from the West Coast during the hysteria of 1942.
  Writes Father Hugh Lavery of the Catholic Maryknoll Mission of Los Angeles: "(Bendetsen) showed himself a little Hitler. I mentioned that we had an aorphanage [sic]. I told him some of these were half-Japanese, others one-fourth or less. I asked, 'Which children should we send to the relocation centers?' (Bendetsen) replied, 'I am determined that if they have one drop of Japanese blood in them they must all go to camp.' Just as with Hitler so with him. It was a question of blood."
  Mike Masoaka, the Japanese-American war hero, has shown the letter to senators, many of whom are opposed to Bendetsen's confirmation as assistant secretary of war, especially since the strong court of appeals opinion written by US Judge Wm. Denman of San Francisco condemning the Army's treatment of Japanese-Americans."
- "Bendetsen Nominated As Army Undersecretary". Toledo Blade. AP. 24 April 1952.
- "Internment of Japanese Civilians In WW II 'Necessary' — Colonel". The Hour. AP. 2 November 1981.
- "WWII internment camps defended". Spokane Daily Chronicle. AP. 2 November 1981.
- "Ex-colonel defends relocation of Japanese". The Spokesman-Review. AP. 3 November 1981.
- "Camps Necessary To Protect Japanese, Ex-Officer Insists". Sarasota Herald-Tribune. UPI. 3 November 1981.
- "Judge challenges lawyer over Japanese camps". The Montreal Gazette. UPI. 4 November 1981.
- Einstein, David (6 December 1981). "Internment: A sad chapter in U.S. history". The Spokesman-Review. Associated Press.
- "Internment deviser K.R. Bendetsen dies". Reading Eagle. Associated Press. 30 June 1989.
- Hideichi Takeguma v. United States, 156 F.2d 437 (9th Cir. 1946).
- Acheson v. Murakami, 176 F.2d 953 (9th. Cir 1949).
- Bendetsen discussed in Episode 2, Episode 3, Episode 4, and Episode 6 of Rachel Maddow's Burn Order podcast (2025)

Government offices
Preceded by New Office	General Counsel of the Army; 1949	Succeeded by Francis Shackelford
Preceded by New Office	Assistant Secretary of the Army (General Management); February 2, 1950 – May 6, 1952	Succeeded by Francis Shackelford
Preceded by Archibald S. Alexander	United States Under Secretary of the Army; May 1952 – January 1954	Succeeded by Earl D. Johnson
