= Valerie L. Baldwin =

American lawyer (born 1961)

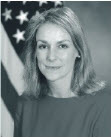
Valerie L. Baldwin

Valerie Lynn Baldwin (born March 10, 1961) is an American lawyer, and was United States Assistant Secretary of the Army (Financial Management and Comptroller) from 2004 to 2007.

== Biography ==
Born in Wichita, Kansas, Valerie Baldwin graduated from Liberal High School in 1979. She received an Associate of Science from Seward County Community College in 1981; a B.A. from Wichita State University in 1983; a M.S. in politics from the London School of Economics in 1984; and a J.D. from the University of Kansas School of Law in 1991.

After law school, Baldwin worked as a trial lawyer for the United States Department of Housing and Urban Development. She later served as a Congressional aide, including as counsel for the United States House Committee on Financial Services. From October 2000 until July 2004, she was a Staff Assistant for the United States House Committee on Appropriations, where she worked for the United States House Appropriations Subcommittee on Military Construction, Veterans Affairs, and Related Agencies.

In 2004, President of the United States George W. Bush nominated Baldwin to be Assistant Secretary of the Army (Financial Management and Comptroller), and after Senate confirmation on July 24, 2004, she entered this office in July 2004. Shortly after she became Army comptroller, the Government Accountability Office released a report documenting that 95% of Army reservists had experienced pay problems, and Baldwin said she would make payroll management one of her top priorities. She held office until 2007.

Since leaving government service, Baldwin has served on the Board of Directors of DataPath, Inc., a subsidiary of Rockwell Collins.

Government offices
Preceded by Sandra L. Pack	Assistant Secretary of the Army (Financial Management and Comptroller); July 2004 – 2006	Succeeded by Nelson M. Ford
