= Chester R. Davis =

American businessman

Chester R. Davis (February 27, 1896 – July 31, 1966) was an American businessman.

== Education and early career ==
Davis was born in St. Charles, Illinois. He worked at the Ziegler Coal Company, and served in the 320th Infantry during World War I. He attended Lake Forest College and the University of Illinois. Immediately after graduating from UI, he became an assistant trust officer at the Chicago Title and Trust Company, where he was elected director and vice-president on January 10, 1939.

== Public service ==
On February 19, 1954, he was nominated by President of the United States Dwight D. Eisenhower for the position of Assistant Secretary of the Army (Financial Management and Comptroller). The US Senate Armed Services Committee approved the nomination on March 4, 1955.

Davis served for two years as Assistant Secretary during which he developed a plan for medical and hospital care for the armed forces. For his "lasting contributions" he was decorated in 1956-12-12. He resigned from that position on 1957-12-15.

After his resignation from government service, he returned to Chicago. In February 1957, he had been appointed to a subcommittee of the Committee of 49, a citizen's advisory committee that had been appointed by the Chicago Welfare Council. He had already served on a similar committee in 1952 to consider the affairs of the county hospital. At the time, he was a Republican.

== Retirement and death ==
He retired from Chicago Title and Trust in 1961. In 1963, he was named vice-president of the Association of the United States Army.

Davis died in 1966 of a heart attack in his home in Wayne, Illinois.

Government offices
| Preceded by Charles C. Finucane | Assistant Secretary of the Army (Financial Management and Comptroller); March 10, 1955 – December 15, 1965 | Succeeded by George H. Roderick |
