= Committee for Hungarian Refugee Relief =

The US President's Committee for Hungarian Refugee Relief was established by President Dwight D. Eisenhower on December 12, 1956. Tracy S. Voorhees served as chairman. The need for such a committee came about as a result of the United States' desire to provide for a share of the Hungarians who fled their country beginning in October 1956. The Committee operated until May 1957. During this time, the Committee helped re-settle in the United States over 30,000 Hungarian refugees. The committee's small staff was funded from the Special Projects Group appropriation. A portion of the committee's records are preserved in Voorhees' papers in Special Collections and University Archives at Rutgers University and are accessible online.

== Duties and objectives ==
- To assist in every way possible the various religious and other voluntary agencies engaged in work for Hungarian refugees.
- To coordinate the efforts of these agencies, with special emphasis on those activities related to resettlement of the refugees. The committee also served as a focal point to which offers of homes and jobs could be forwarded.
- To coordinate the efforts of the voluntary agencies with the work of the interested governmental departments.
