= Robert M. Speer =

American businessman (born 1956)

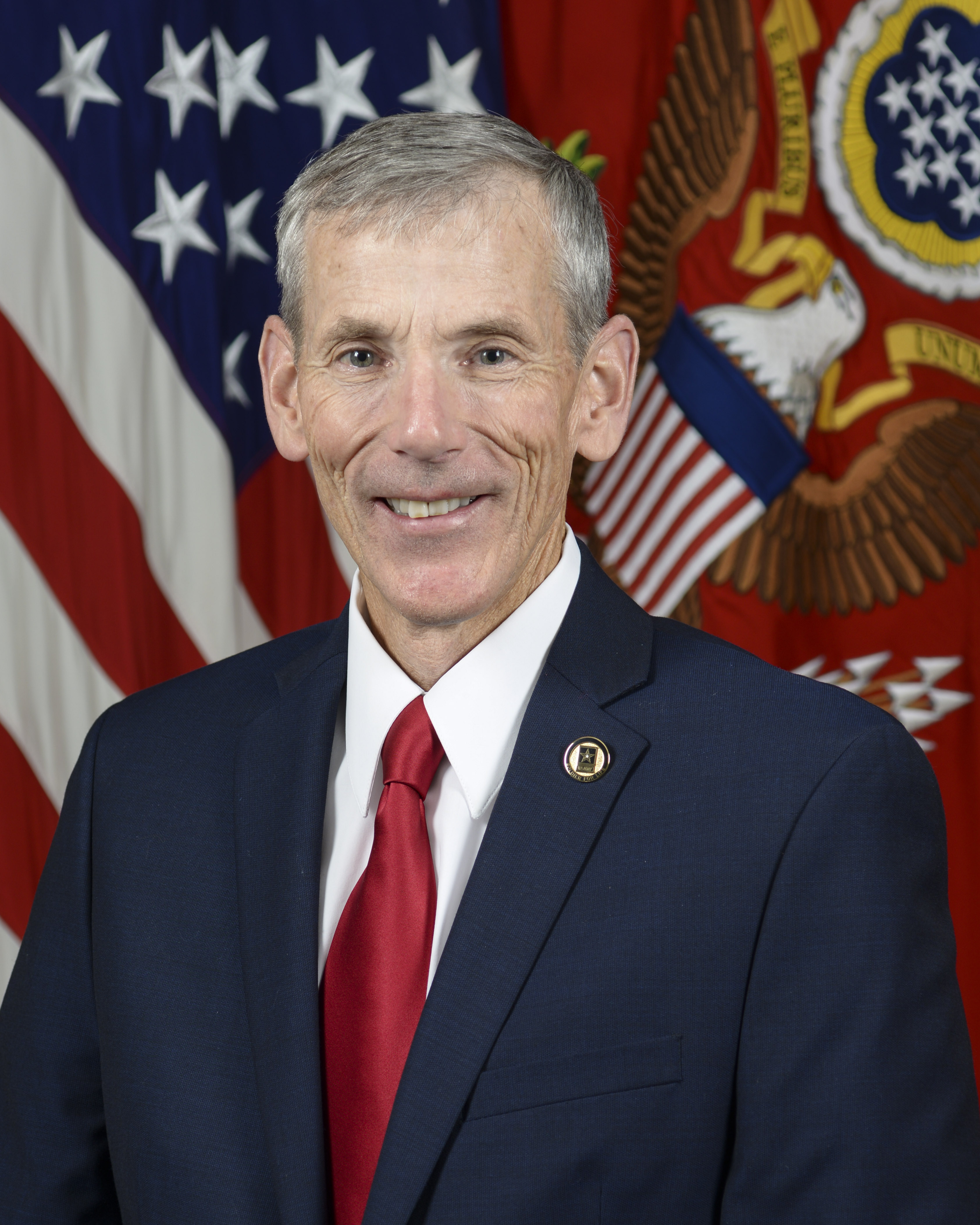
- Official portrait, 2017

Acting United States Secretary of the Army
- In office January 20, 2017 – August 2, 2017
- President: Donald Trump
- Preceded by: Eric Fanning
- Succeeded by: Ryan McCarthy (acting)

15th Assistant Secretary of the Army (Financial Management and Comptroller)
- In office November 20, 2014 – January 19, 2017
- President: Barack Obama
- Preceded by: Mary Sally Matiella
- Succeeded by: John E. Whitley

Personal details
- Born: February 10, 1956 (age 70)
- Education: University of Notre Dame (BS); Indiana University, Bloomington (MBA); National Defense University (MS)

Military service
- Allegiance: United States
- Branch/service: United States Army
- Years of service: 1976–2004
- Rank: Colonel
- Unit: 82nd Airborne Division

Robert M. Speer (born February 10, 1956) is a retired military officer and American businessman who manages a consulting practice. In addition, he serves on several boards, including as chairman of the Code of Support Foundation, a military services organization. Formerly, he served as Acting United States Secretary of the Army from January 20, 2017 to August 2, 2017.

== Early life and education ==
He attended University of Notre Dame (BA, Accounting), Indiana University Bloomington (MBA, Information Systems) and Industrial College of the Armed Forces of National Defense University (MS, National Resource Strategy). He was commissioned in the Army through the Reserve Officers' Training Corps (ROTC).

== Career ==
Speer served 28 years in the U. S. Army having been Battalion Commander in the 82nd Airborne Division and Brigade Level Command of a Defense Agency operation. In 2004, Robert Speer was tapped to establish financial controls in Iraq for $18.6 billion appropriated for reconstruction projects during the occupation of Iraq. He then served as a managing director for PricewaterhouseCoopers where he led their Defense and Army business. In October 2009, he was designated the Principal Deputy Assistant Secretary of the Army (Financial Management and Comptroller), and in December 2014, Assistant Secretary of the Army for Financial Management and Comptroller. In January, 2017, Speer was one of only six senior Pentagon officials to be asked to stay through the transition to President Trump's administration.

== Personal life ==
Speer currently resides in Virginia. He and his wife have four adult children and two grandchildren.

Government offices
Preceded by Mary Sally Matiella	Assistant Secretary of the Army (Financial Management and Comptroller); 2014–2017	Succeeded by John E. Whitley
Political offices
Preceded by Eric Fanning	United States Secretary of the Army; Acting; 2017	Succeeded by Ryan McCarthy; Acting
