= John Slezak =

United States Under Secretary of the Army (1896–1984)

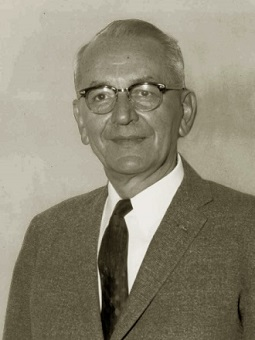

United States Under Secretary of the Army
- In office February 1954 – January 1955
- President: Dwight D. Eisenhower
- Preceded by: Earl D. Johnson
- Succeeded by: Charles C. Finucane

Personal details
- Born: April 18, 1896 Stará Turá, Austria-Hungary
- Died: April 14, 1984 (aged 87) Sycamore, Illinois, U.S.
- Awards: Legion of Merit 1944; Oak Leaf Cluster 1946; American Campaign Medal; World War II Victory Medal

Military service
- Allegiance: United States
- Branch/service: United States Army
- Years of service: 1924–1946
- Rank: Colonel

John Slezak (April 18, 1896 – April 14, 1984) was United States Under Secretary of the Army from 1954 to 1955.

== Biography ==
John Slezak was born in Stará Turá, Austria-Hungary (in modern Slovakia) on April 18, 1896. After immigrating to the United States in 1916, Slezak enlisted in the United States Army in 1917 and was posted to the Rock Island Arsenal, where he became head of a department in the small arms division. In 1919, he enrolled at the University of Wisconsin–Madison and received a B.S. in mechanical engineering in 1923. He worked as a mechanical engineer at Western Electric from 1923 to 1930. In September 1924, he was appointed a second lieutenant in the United States Army Reserve, serving as an ordnance officer. In 1930, he became president of the Turner Brass Works in Sycamore, Illinois, a position he held until 1953.

With the U.S.'s entry into World War II, Slezak became a major in the United States Army. He was promoted to lieutenant colonel in 1942 and colonel in 1943. He spent 47 months with the Chicago Ordnance District, first as Deputy District Chief, then as Chief of the Industrial Division, and finally as District Chief. For his war service, Slezak was awarded the Legion of Merit in 1944; the Oak Leaf Cluster in 1946; and the American Campaign Medal and the World War II Victory Medal. After the war, as a civilian, Slezak helped to establish the machine tool division of the Army-Navy Munitions Board.

In 1948, Slezak became president and chairman of the board of the Pheoil Manufacturing Company in Chicago. He served as director of the National Association of Manufacturers 1952-53.

In 1953, President of the United States Dwight D. Eisenhower nominated Slezak as Assistant Secretary of the Army (Materiel) and he subsequently held this post from May 4, 1953 until February 7, 1954. Eisenhower then nominated him as United States Under Secretary of the Army and he subsequently held this post from February 1954 until January 1955. He then served as director of the Association of the United States Army from 1955 to 1957.

From 1957 until his retirement in 1978, Slezak served as chairman of the Reserve Forces Policy Board of the United States Department of Defense.

Slezak served on the board of directors of many companies, including the Kable Printing Company (chairman of the board, 1947–72); the Hazeltine Corporation; the Clayton Mark Company; and the Roper Corporation.

He was also a trustee of the Illinois Institute of Technology 1949-84 and of the Foundation for Economic Education 1955-67.

Slezak died in Sycamore, Illinois on April 14, 1984.

Government offices
Preceded by Earl D. Johnson	United States Under Secretary of the Army; February 1954 – January 1955	Succeeded by Charles C. Finucane
