= Joseph W. Westphal =

American Government Official (born 1948)

Joseph Westphal
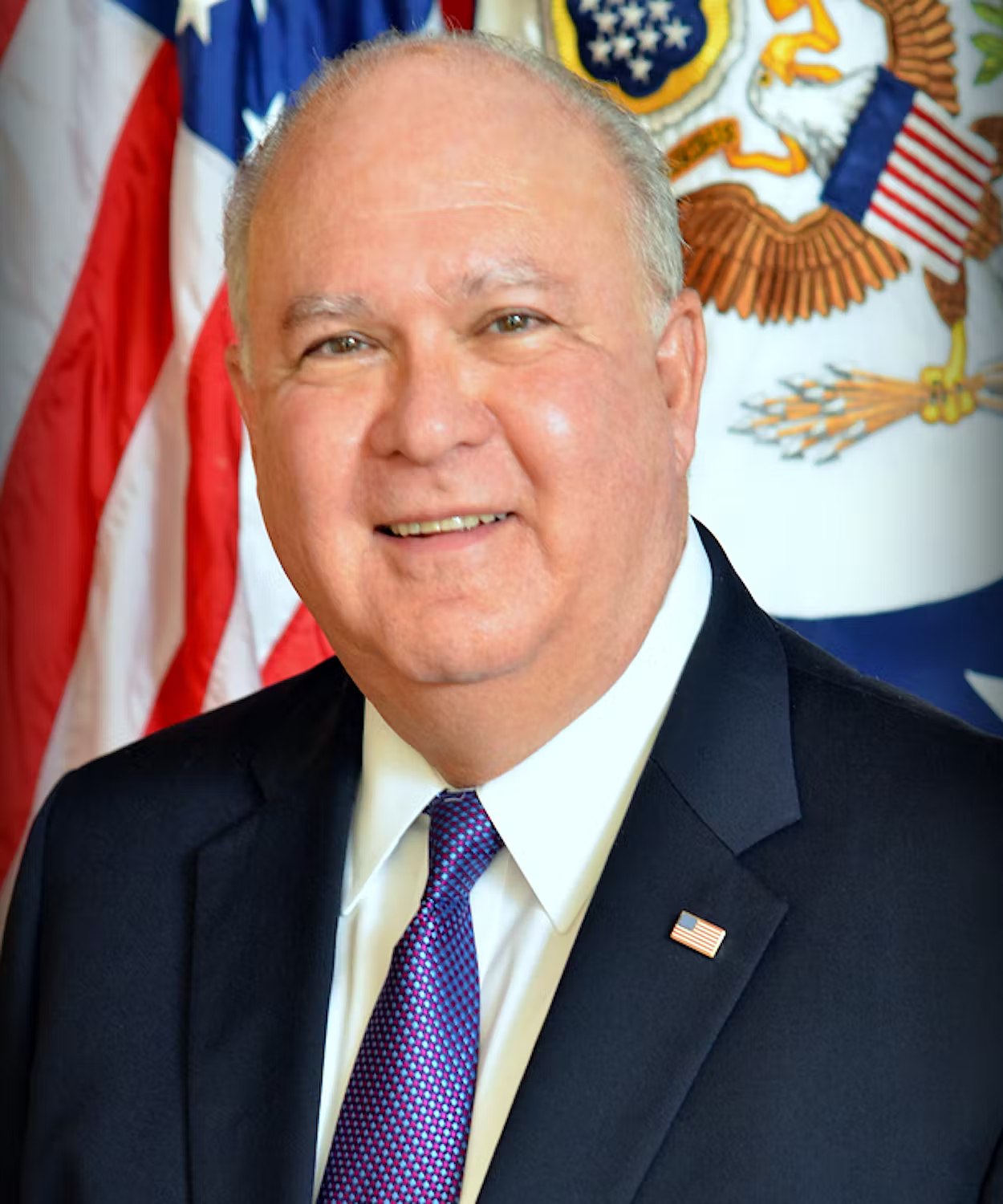

United States Ambassador to Saudi Arabia
- In office March 28, 2014 – January 9, 2017
- President: Barack Obama
- Preceded by: James B. Smith
- Succeeded by: John Abizaid

United States Under Secretary of the Army
- In office September 21, 2009 – March 28, 2014
- President: Barack Obama
- Preceded by: Nelson Ford
- Succeeded by: Brad Carson

Acting United States Secretary of the Army
- In office March 5, 2001 – May 31, 2001
- President: George W. Bush
- Preceded by: Gregory R. Dahlberg (acting)
- Succeeded by: Thomas E. White

Assistant Secretary of the Army for Civil Works
- In office June 1998 – March 5, 2001
- President: Bill Clinton
- Preceded by: Martin Lancaster
- Succeeded by: Michael Parker

Personal details
- Born: José Guillermo Westphal; January 26, 1948 (age 78) Santiago, Chile
- Education: Adelphi University (BA); University of Missouri, Columbia (MA, PhD)

Joseph William Westphal (/ˈwɛstfəl/; born January 26, 1948) is an American government official and diplomat who was most recently the United States Ambassador to Saudi Arabia. He served as the 30th United States Under Secretary of the Army from 2009 to 2014.

== Early life and education ==
Westphal was born in Santiago, Chile. He earned a Bachelor of Arts degree from Adelphi University in New York in 1970, a Master of Arts degree from Oklahoma State University in 1973 and a Ph.D. in political science from the University of Missouri in 1980.

== Career ==
Westphal served as the head of the department of political science at Oklahoma State University between 1975 and 1987 and as an adjunct professor at Georgetown University while working at the law firm of Patton Boggs. He served as Assistant Secretary of the Army for Civil Works from 1998 to 2001 and the Acting Secretary of the Army in 2001. He also served as chancellor of the University of Maine System from 2002 to 2006 and was a professor of political science at the University of Maine from 2002 to 2009. He later served as the provost, at The New School in New York City.

Westphal was a member of President Obama's Transition Team for Defense and was appointed as the United States Under Secretary of the Army in September 2009. He was confirmed by the U.S. Senate as ambassador to Saudi Arabia on March 26, 2014, and sworn in the same day. Westphal is a senior fellow at the Wharton Leadership Program at UPenn and a fellow of the National Academy of Public Administration.

Political offices
Preceded by Martin Lancaster	Assistant Secretary of the Army for Civil Works; 1998–2001	Succeeded by Michael Parker
Preceded by Gregory Dahlberg; Acting	United States Secretary of the Army; Acting; 2001	Succeeded by Thomas White
Preceded by Nelson Ford	United States Under Secretary of the Army; 2009–2014	Succeeded by Brad Carson
Diplomatic posts
Preceded by James Smith	United States Ambassador to Saudi Arabia; 2014–2017	Succeeded by John Abizaid
