= United States Under Secretary of the Army =

United States government office

- Seal of the Department

- Flag of the under secretary

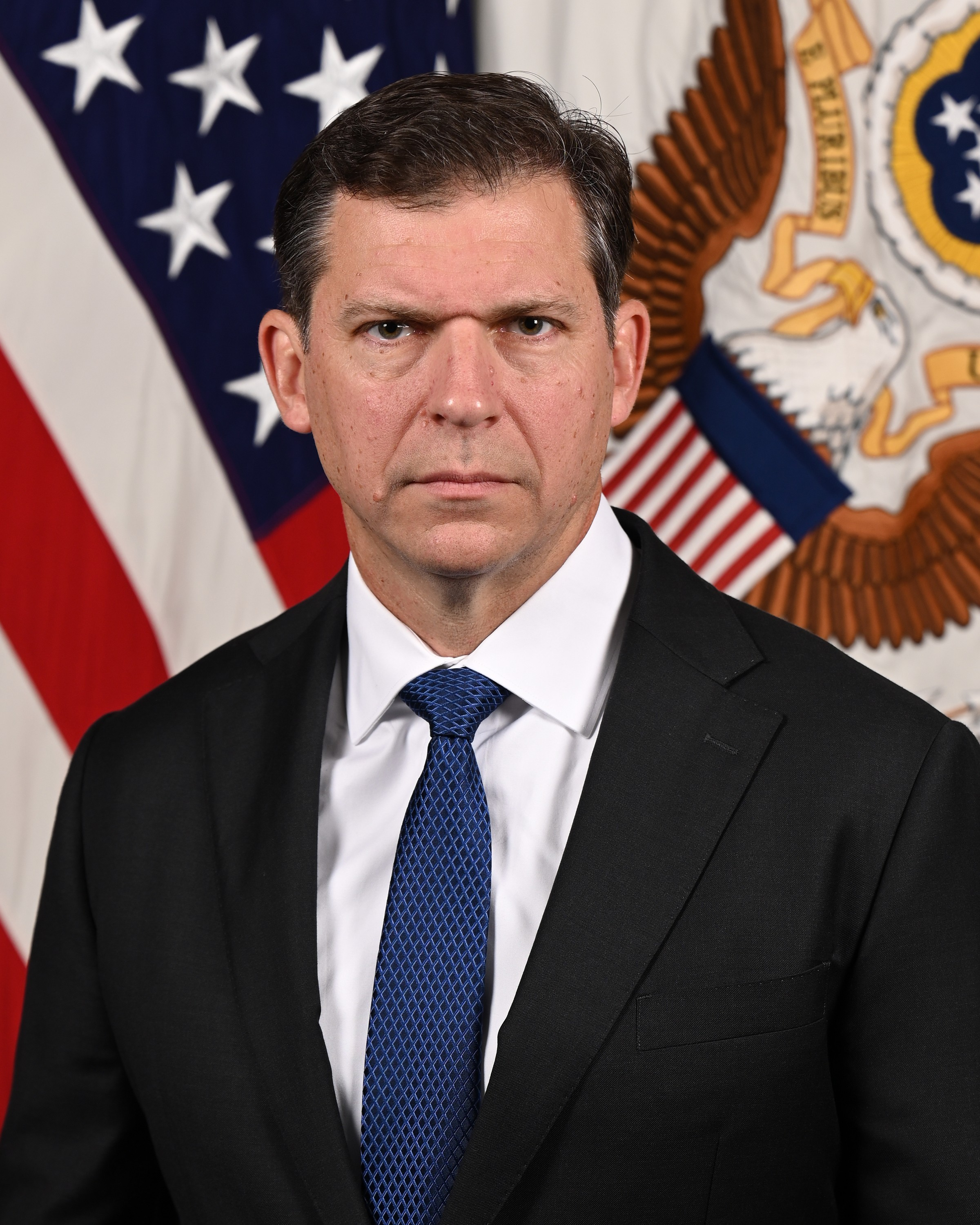
- Incumbent; Mike Obadal since September 22, 2025
- United States Department of the Army
- Style: Mr. Under Secretary
- Reports to: Secretary of the Army
- Appointer: The president with Senate advice and consent
- Term length: No fixed term
- Formation: September 18, 1947
- First holder: William Henry Draper Jr.
- Succession: 18th in SecDef succession
- Salary: Executive Schedule, level III
- Website: www.army.mil

The United States under secretary of the Army is the second-highest-ranking civilian official of the United States Department of the Army, serving directly under the secretary of the Army. The secretary and under secretary, together with two military officers, the chief of staff and the vice chief of staff of the Army, constitute the senior leaders of the United States Army.

The following officials report to the under secretary of the Army:

- Assistant Secretary of the Army (Manpower and Reserve Affairs)
- Assistant Secretary of the Army (Installations, Energy and Environment)
- Assistant Secretary of the Army (Civil Works)
- Assistant Secretary of the Army (Acquisition, Logistics and Technology)
- Assistant Secretary of the Army (Financial Management and Comptroller)
- General Counsel of the Army

There is also a deputy under secretary of the Army who assists the under secretary in his tasks, including direction of the Army Science Board and the Army Analytics Group, and oversight of the Army's test and evaluation efforts.

== History ==
The office was created in 1947 as part of the general reorganization of the United States Armed Forces occasioned by the National Security Act of 1947. The office was initially styled "Under Secretary of War" and was created by Department of War General Order 67, dated July 25, 1947. Three weeks later, on August 16, 1947, Department of War Circular 225 redesignated the position as "Under Secretary of the Army".

== List of under secretaries of the Army ==
The following men have held the post:

No.	Portrait	Name	Term start	Term end	President(s) served under
1		William Henry Draper Jr.	September 18, 1947	February 28, 1949	Harry S. Truman
2		Gordon Gray	May 1949	June 1949	Harry S. Truman
3		Tracy Voorhees	August 1949	April 1950	Harry S. Truman
4		Archibald S. Alexander	May 1950	April 1952	Harry S. Truman
5		Karl R. Bendesten	May 1952	October 1952	Harry S. Truman
6		Earl D. Johnson	October 1952	January 1954	Harry S. Truman; Dwight D. Eisenhower
7		John Slezak	February 1954	January 1955	Dwight D. Eisenhower
8		Charles C. Finucane	February 1955	April 1958	Dwight D. Eisenhower
9		Hugh M. Milton II	August 1958	January 1961	Dwight D. Eisenhower
10		Stephen Ailes	February 1961	January 1964	John F. Kennedy; Lyndon B. Johnson
11		Paul Robert Ignatius	February 1964	December 1964	Lyndon B. Johnson
12		Stanley Rogers Resor	April 1965	July 1965	Lyndon B. Johnson
13		David E. McGiffert	November 1965	February 1969	Lyndon B. Johnson; Richard Nixon
14		Thaddeus Beal	March 1969	September 1971	Richard Nixon
15		Kenneth E. BeLieu	September 1971	June 1973	Richard Nixon
16		Herman R. Staudt	October 1973	May 1975	Gerald Ford
17		Norman Ralph Augustine	May 1975	July 1977	Gerald Ford; Jimmy Carter
18		Walter B. LaBerge	July 1977	February 27, 1980	Jimmy Carter
19		Robert Harry Spiro Jr.	February 28, 1980	October 6, 1981	Jimmy Carter; Ronald Reagan
20		James R. Ambrose	October 7, 1981	February 1988	Ronald Reagan
21		Michael P. W. Stone	May 1988	August 14, 1989	George H.W. Bush
22		John W. Shannon	August 14, 1989	November 23, 1993	George H.W. Bush; Bill Clinton
23		Joe R. Reeder	November 24, 1993	November 12, 1997	Bill Clinton
24		Robert M. Walker	November 13, 1997	October 15, 1998	Bill Clinton
25		Bernard D. Rostker	November 1998	May 23, 2000	Bill Clinton
26		Gregory R. Dahlberg	May 23, 2000	March 4, 2001	Bill Clinton; George W. Bush
27		Les Brownlee	November 10, 2001	December 16, 2004	George W. Bush
28		Raymond F. DuBois	February 18, 2005	February 20, 2006	George W. Bush
28		Pete Geren	February 21, 2006	July 23, 2007	George W. Bush
29		Nelson M. Ford	July 24, 2007	January 20, 2009	George W. Bush
30		Joseph W. Westphal	September 21, 2009	March 28, 2014	Barack Obama
31		Brad Carson	March 28, 2014	June 30, 2015	Barack Obama
–		Eric Fanning (acting)	June 30, 2015	November 3, 2015	Barack Obama
–		Thomas E. Hawley (acting)	November 3, 2015	January 4, 2016	Barack Obama
32		Patrick Murphy	January 4, 2016	January 20, 2017	Barack Obama
–		Karl F. Schneider (acting)	January 20, 2017	July 31, 2017	Donald Trump
33		Ryan McCarthy	August 1, 2017	September 30, 2019; Serving as Acting Secretary of the Army: July 23, 2019 – September 30, 2019	Donald Trump
34		James E. McPherson	July 23, 2019	March 25, 2020	Donald Trump
34		James E. McPherson	March 25, 2020	January 20, 2021	Donald Trump
–		Christopher Lowman (acting)	January 20, 2021	February 7, 2022	Joe Biden
35		Gabriel Camarillo	February 8, 2022	January 20, 2025	Joe Biden
–		David R. Fitzgerald (acting)	January 20, 2025	September 22, 2025	Donald Trump
36		Mike Obadal	September 22, 2025	Incumbent	Donald Trump
