= Loomis, Sayles & Company =

United States investment management firm based in Boston

Loomis Sayles & Company
- Company type: Subsidiary
- Founded: 1926
- Headquarters: Boston, MA, United States
- Key people: Kevin Charleston (Chairman & CEO)
- AUM: $388.6 billion (Sep 2024)
- Parent: Natixis Investment Managers
- Website: www.loomissayles.com

Loomis, Sayles & Company L.P. is an American investment management firm based in Boston. As of December 31, 2023, Loomis Sayles has roughly US$335 billion in assets under management.

Loomis Sayles was founded in 1926 by Robert H. Loomis and Ralph T. Sayles. In 2000, it was acquired by Natixis Global Asset Management.

== Products ==
Loomis Sayles offers a variety of products for institutional investor and retail investors. It has institutional clients in 20 countries across six continents. Vehicles include Mutual Funds, Institutional Separate Accounts, Exchange Traded Funds, Managed Accounts, Hedge Funds, Collective Trusts and Other Private Placements.

== Strategy ==
Loomis Sayles has experimented with a variety of styles, notably including bottom-up, quantitative, and macro.
