= Assistant Secretary of the Army for Installations, Energy and Environment =

- Seal of the Office of the Assistant Secretary of the Army for Installations, Energy and Environment

- Flag of an assistant secretary of the Army

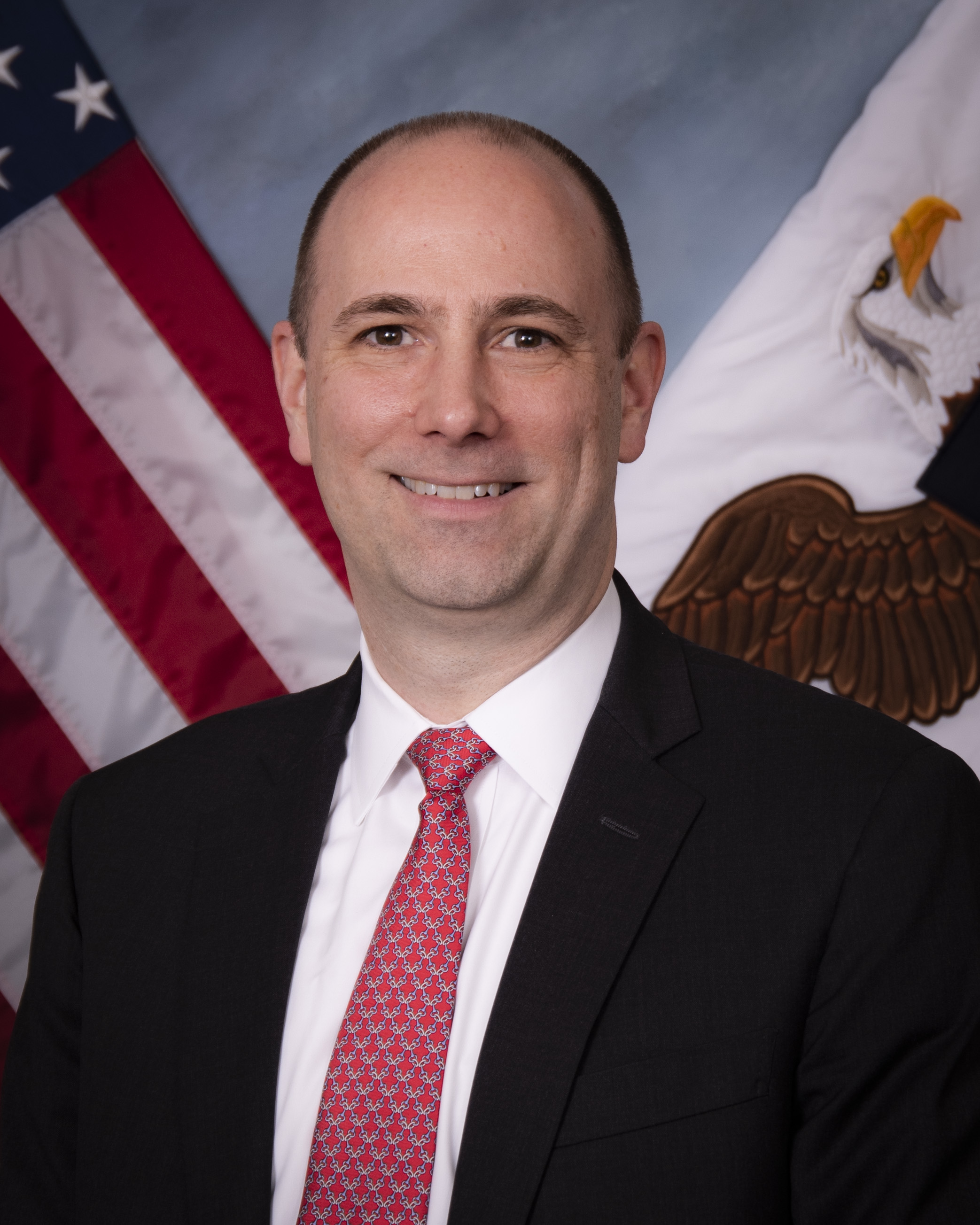
- Incumbent; Jordan Gillis since October 6, 2025
- United States Department of the Army
- Style: Mr. Secretary; The Honorable (formal address in writing)
- Reports to: Secretary of the Army; Under Secretary of the Army
- Seat: The Pentagon, Arlington County, Virginia, United States
- Nominator: The president with Senate advice and consent
- Term length: No fixed term
- Constituting instrument: 10. U.S.C. § 7016
- Formation: December 7, 1984
- First holder: John W. Shannon
- Succession: Joint 18th in SecDef succession in seniority of appointment
- Deputy: Principal Deputy Assistant Secretary
- Salary: Executive Schedule, Level IV
- Website: Official website

Assistant Secretary of the Army for Installations, Energy and Environment (abbreviated ASA (IE&E)) is a civilian office within the United States Department of the Army.

== Roles and responsibilities ==
The assistant secretary of the Army (installations, energy and environment) is the primary advisor to the secretary and chief of staff of the Army on all United States Army matters related to infrastructure, installation policy, oversight and coordination of energy security, environmental management, safety and occupational health. The ASA (IE&E) is also responsible for policy and oversight of sustainability, safety, occupational health, and environmental initiatives; resource management including design, military construction, operations and maintenance; Base Realignment and Closure; privatization of Army family housing, lodging, real estate, and utilities; and the Army's installations safety and occupational health programs.

== Organization ==
The Office of the Assistant Secretary of the Army for Installations, Energy and Environment oversees the following positions:

- Deputy Assistant Secretary of the Army for Environment, Safety and Occupational Health
- Deputy Assistant Secretary of the Army for Installations, Housing & Partnerships
- Deputy Assistant Secretary of the Army for Energy and Sustainability

== Officeholders ==
Portrait	Name	Tenure	SecArmy(s) served under	President(s) served under
Assistant Secretary of the Army for Installations, Logistics and Environment
	John W. Shannon	December 7, 1984 – August 13, 1989	John O. Marsh, Jr.	Ronald Reagan; George H. W. Bush
	Susan M. Livingstone	1989 – January 20, 1993	Michael P. W. Stone	George H. W. Bush
	Robert M. Walker	March 17, 1994 – June 9, 1998	Togo D. West Jr.	Bill Clinton
Assistant Secretary of the Army for Installations and Environment
	Mahlon Apgar, IV	June 9, 1998 – January 20, 2001	Louis Caldera	Bill Clinton
	Mario P. Fiori	August 13, 2001 – December 15, 2003	Thomas E. White	George W. Bush
	Keith E. Eastin	July 29, 2005 – January 20, 2007	Francis J. Harvey	George W. Bush
	Katherine G. Hammack	June 28, 2010 – September 30, 2010	John M. McHugh	Barack Obama
Assistant Secretary of the Army for Installations, Energy and Environment
	Katherine G. Hammack	October 1, 2010 – January 20, 2017	John M. McHugh; Eric Fanning	Barack Obama
	J. Randall Robinson	January 20, 2017 – October 16, 2017	–	Donald Trump
	Jordan Gillis	October 16, 2017 – January 10, 2019	Mark Esper	Donald Trump
	Alex A. Beehler	January 10, 2019 – January 20, 2021	Mark Esper; Ryan D. McCarthy	Donald Trump
	Jack Surash; Senior Official Performing the Duties of	January 20, 2021 – October 3, 2021	Christine Wormuth	Joe Biden
	Paul Farnan; Acting	October 4, 2021 – April 4, 2022	Christine Wormuth	Joe Biden
	Rachel Jacobson	April 4, 2022 – January 20, 2025	Christine Wormuth	Joe Biden
	Daniel Klippstein; Senior Official Performing The Duties Of	January 20, 2025 – April 20, 2025	Daniel P. Driscoll	Donald Trump
	Jeff Waksman; Acting	April 20, 2025 – October 6, 2025	Daniel P. Driscoll	Donald Trump
	Jordan Gillis	October 6, 2025 – Present	Daniel P. Driscoll	Donald Trump

=== Principal Deputy Assistant Secretary ===
Portrait	Name	Tenure	ASA (IE&E)(s) served under	SecArmy(s) served under	President(s) served under
Principal Deputy Assistant Secretary of the Army for Installations, Energy and Environment
	L. Jerry Hansen	June 2010 – 2012	Katherine G. Hammack	John M. McHugh	Barack Obama
	J. Randall Robinson	June 1, 2012–July 2018	Katherine G. Hammack	John M. McHugh; Mark Esper	Barack Obama; Donald Trump
	Jordan Gillis	January 10, 2019 – March 30, 2020	Alex A. Beehler	Mark Esper; Ryan D. McCarthy	Donald Trump
	Bryan M. Gossage	May 18, 2020 – January 20, 2021	Alex A. Beehler	Ryan D. McCarthy	Donald Trump
	Carla K. Coulson; Acting	January 20, 2021 – October 3, 2021	Jack Surash	Christine Wormuth	Joe Biden
	Jack Surash; Acting	October 4, 2021 – April 4, 2022	Paul Farnan	Christine Wormuth	Joe Biden
	Paul Farnan	April 4, 2022 – January 20, 2025	Rachel Jacobson	Christine Wormuth	Joe Biden
	David Dentino; Acting	January 20, 2025 – April 20, 2025	Daniel Klippstein	Daniel P. Driscoll	Donald Trump
	Daniel Klippstein; Senior Official Performing The Duties Of	April 20, 2025 – October 6, 2025	Jeff Waksman	Daniel P. Driscoll	Donald Trump
	Jeff Waksman	October 6, 2025 – Present	Jordan Gillis	Daniel P. Driscoll	Donald Trump

== Deputy assistant secretaries ==
=== Environment, safety and occupational health ===
Deputy Assistant Secretary of the Army for Environment, Safety and Occupational Health
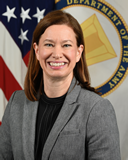
- Incumbent; Amy L. Borman since March 2020
- United States Department of the Army
- Reports to: ASA (IE&E)
- Appointer: United States Secretary of the Army
- Term length: No fixed term
- Deputy: Military Deputy (Colonel)
- Website: Official website

The deputy assistant secretary of the Army for environment, safety and occupational health (abbreviated DASA-ESOH) is one of the four deputy assistant secretaries that report to the ASA (IE&E).

==== Roles and responsibilities ====
The deputy assistant secretary of the Army for environment, safety and occupational health serves to coordinate the army's environmental programs, through providing policy, programming, and oversight. The DASA also serves as the primary advisor to army commanders on environment, safety and occupational health matters, along with executing the Army's arms control program.

==== Organization ====
In order to achieve its goals, the ASDA oversees a number of specialist directorates and organizations; these are:

- Munitions & Chemical Matters Directorate – is the primary advisor on the environmental, safety and occupational health aspects of explosive and toxic military chemicals. The directorate's scope includes: operational ranges, historic sea disposal of munitions, and life-cycle munitions management. The directorate exercises control over a number of, both cross-service DoD and US Army, programs; these being:
  - Department of Defense Explosives Safety Management Program
  - Department of Defense Recovered Chemical Warfare Materiel Program
  - Department of Defense Chemical Demilitarization Program
  - Army 3Rs (Recognize, Retreat, Report) Explosives Safety Education Program
  - Non-Stockpile Chemical Materiel Project (controlled by CMA)
  - Sea-Disposed Chemical Warfare Material Program
  - Low-Level Radioactive Waste Program
- Environmental Quality Directorate – controls army programs relating to natural resource and cultural resource legal requirements, as well as Native American affairs, including legal, treaty, and trust responsibilities. Furthermore, the directorate undertakes work in the fields of air, water, and waste legal requirements, environmental impact analysis, and environmental program performance auditing. The directorate's programs include:
  - Army Conservation Program
  - Army Environmental Compliance Program
- Restoration Directorate – is responsible for overseeing and controlling the cleanup of past contamination for which the Army is deemed responsible, 'at a facility or site owned, leased, or possessed by the Army within the United States at the time of actions leading to contamination'. The directorate overseas the following programs:
  - Base Realignment and Closure Restoration Program
    - Installation Restoration Program
    - Military Munitions Response Program
    - Building Demolition/Debris Removal Program
  - Formerly Used Defense Sites Program
  - Army Compliance Cleanup Program
  - Defense and State Memorandum of Agreement Program
  - Agency for Toxic Substances and Disease Registry
- Safety Directorate – sets policy and standards relating to Department of the Army safety matters and the Army Safety Program; proposes safety programming and funding; and provides safety program management and oversight.
- Occupational & Environmental Health Directorate – provides oversight, management, and coordination of OEH programs and services.
- Technology Directorate – advises on policy in relation to environmental technology needs and requirements.
  - Environmental Information Technology Management Program
  - National Defense Center for Energy and Environment
  - Army Environmental Quality Technology Program
  - US/German Data Exchange Agreement for Environmental Technology
  - Western Hemisphere Information Exchange Program
- Department of Defense Unexploded Ordnance Center of Excellence

==== Officeholders ====
Portrait	Name	Tenure	ASA (IE&E)(s) served under	SecArmy(s) served under	President(s) served under
Deputy Assistant Secretary of the Army for Environment, Safety and Occupational Health
	Hershell E. Wolfe	April 10, 2011–May 2015	Katherine G. Hammack	John M. McHugh	Barack Obama
	Eugene Collins	June 15, 2015–November 2019	Eric Fanning	John McHugh; Mark Esper	Donald Trump
	Amy L. Borman	March 2020–present	Alex A. Beehler	Ryan D. McCarthy; Christine Wormuth	Donald Trump; Joe Biden

=== Installations, housing and partnerships ===
Deputy Assistant Secretary of the Army for Installations, Housing and Partnerships
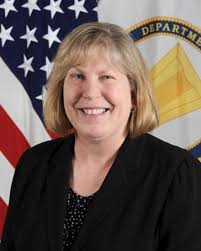
- Incumbent; Carla K. Coulson since October 2020
- United States Department of the Army
- Reports to: ASA (IE&E)
- Appointer: United States Secretary of the Army
- Term length: No fixed term
- Website: Official website

The deputy assistant secretary of the Army for installations, housing and partnerships (abbreviated DASA-IH&P) is one of the four deputy assistant secretaries that report to the ASA (IE&E).

==== Roles and responsibilities ====
The deputy assistant secretary of the Army for installations, housing and partnerships serves to provide assistance, advice, policy, programming, and oversight, of all matters relating to army installations, including: real estate, military construction, engineering, housing, and base realignments and closures. All of this seeks to create sustainable installations to support the Army's mission, along with provide an excellent quality of life for serving personnel and their families.

==== Organization ====
- Residential Communities Initiative
- Privatization of Army Lodging Program
- Office of Historic Properties & Partnerships – raises awareness, renovates, restores, and preserves the Army's inventory of historic buildings.

==== Officeholders ====
Portrait	Name	Tenure	ASA (IE&E)(s) served under	SecArmy(s) served under	President(s) served under
Deputy Assistant Secretary of the Army for Installations, Housing and Partnerships
	Joseph F. Calcara	March 2008–March 2012	Katherine G. Hammack	Pete Geren; John M. McHugh	Barack Obama
Position vacant
	Paul D. Cramer	June 30, 2013–September 2020	Katherine G. Hammack; Alex A. Beehler	John M. McHugh; Eric Fanning; Mark Esper; Ryan D. McCarthy	Barack Obama; Donald Trump
	Scott Chamberlain	September 2020–October 2020	Alex A. Beehler	Ryan D. McCarthy	Donald Trump
	Carla K. Coulson	October 2020–present	Alex A. Beehler	Ryan D. McCarthy; Christine Wormuth	Donald Trump; Joe Biden

=== Energy and sustainability ===
Deputy Assistant Secretary of the Army for Energy and Sustainability
- Incumbent; Brandon Cockrell since August 2024
- United States Department of the Army
- Reports to: ASA (IE&E)
- Appointer: United States Secretary of the Army
- Term length: No fixed term
- Website: Official website

The deputy assistant secretary of the Army for energy and sustainability (abbreviated DASA-E&S) is one of the four deputy assistant secretaries that report to the ASA (IE&E).

==== Roles and responsibilities ====
The deputy assistant secretary of the Army for energy and sustainability serves to provide assistance, advice, policy, programming, and oversight, of all matters relating to the Army's ability to access energy and water, in order to enhance the Army's operational capabilities, enhance the current facilities, and support the state of readiness.

==== Organization ====
- Office of Energy Initiatives – serves to oversee, develop, implement large-scale energy projects related to army installations.

==== Officeholders ====
Portrait	Name	Tenure	ASA (IE&E)(s) served under	SecArmy(s) served under	President(s) served under
Deputy Assistant Secretary of the Army for Energy and Sustainability
	Richard G. Kidd IV	October 25, 2010–July 2016	Katherine G. Hammack	John M. McHugh; Eric Fanning	Barack Obama
	Jack Surash	September 2016–January 20, 2021	Katherine G. Hammack; Alex A. Beehler	Eric Fanning; Mark Esper; Ryan D. McCarthy	Barack Obama; Donald Trump
	Michael F. McGhee	January 20, 2021 – March 24, 2021	Jack Surash	John E. Whitley	Joe Biden
	Christine Ploschke	March 24, 2021 – April 2, 2022	Jack Surash; Paul Farnan	John E. Whitley; Christine Wormuth	Joe Biden
	Jack Surash	April 4, 2022-July 2022	Rachel Jacobson	Christine Wormuth	Joe Biden
	Christine Ploschke	August 2022–August 2024	Rachel Jacobson	Christine Wormuth	Joe Biden

=== Strategic integration ===
Deputy Assistant Secretary of the Army for Strategic Integration
- United States Department of the Army
- Reports to: ASA (IE&E)
- Appointer: United States Secretary of the Army
- Term length: No fixed term
- Abolished: June 30, 2021
- Website: Official website

The deputy assistant secretary of the Army for strategic integration (abbreviated DASA-SI) was one of the four deputy assistant secretaries that reported to the ASA (IE&E). On June 30, 2021, the office was downgraded to a directorate reporting to the PDASA (IE&E).

==== Roles and responsibilities ====
The deputy assistant secretary of the Army for strategic integration served to integrate strategic installation, environmental and energy policy initiatives and requirements, mustered by the other three deputy assistant secretaries, into the Department of Defense and Army planning processes, and other areas of governance.

==== Organization ====
- Quality of Life Task Force
- COVID-19 Lessons Learned
- Installations of the Future Initiative
- Regional Environmental and Energy Offices
  - Regional Environmental and Energy Office–Northern
  - Regional Environmental and Energy Office–Southern
  - Regional Environmental and Energy Office–Central
  - Regional Environmental and Energy Office–Western
- Army Environmental Policy Institute

==== Officeholders ====
Portrait	Name	Tenure	ASA (IE&E)(s) served under	SecArmy(s) served under	President(s) served under
Deputy Assistant Secretary of the Army for Strategic Integration
	Mark D. Rocke	2008–2015			Barack Obama
	John Pellegrino	June 2015–January 2017	Katherine G. Hammack	John M. McHugh; Eric Fanning	Barack Obama
	Richard G. Kidd IV	February 2017–January 20, 2021	Alex A. Beehler	Mark Esper; Ryan D. McCarthy	Donald Trump
	John R. Thompson	January 20, 2021–March 2021	–	–	Joe Biden
	Shelley A. Richardson	March 2021–June 30, 2021	–	John E. Witley; Christine Wormuth	Joe Biden
