= Assistant Secretary of Defense for Sustainment =

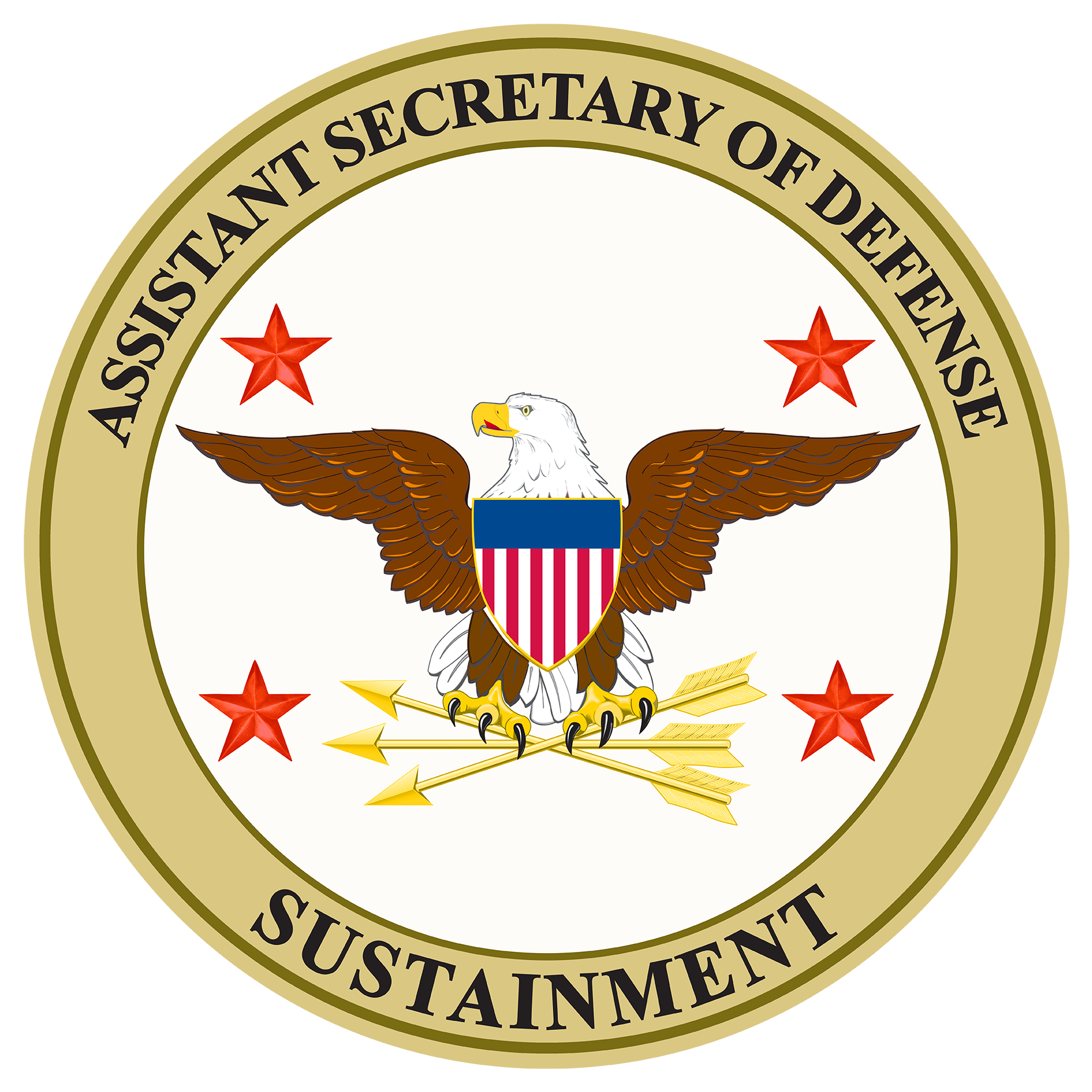
- Seal of the assistant secretary of defense for sustainment

- Flag of an assistant secretary of defense

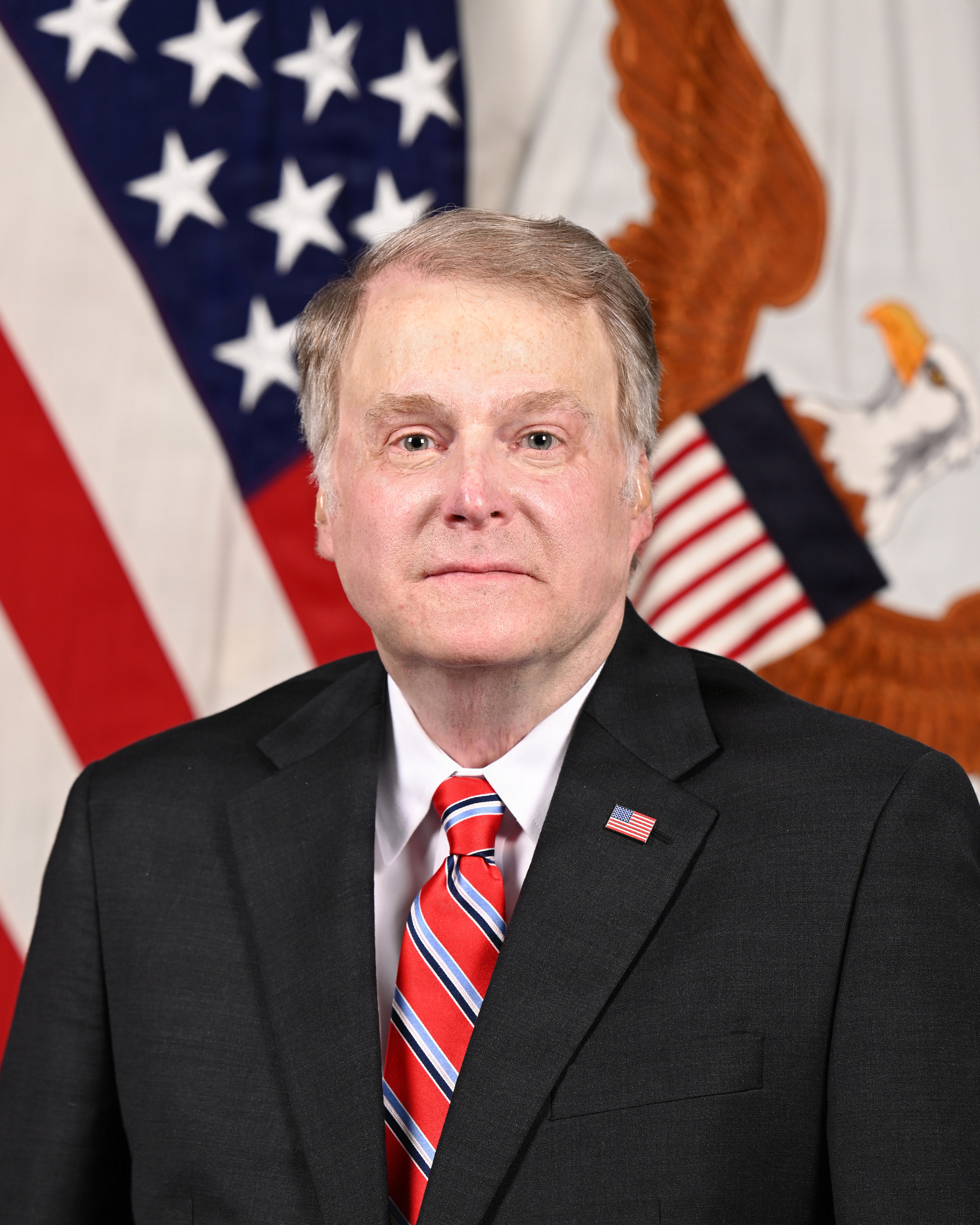
- Incumbent; Brian Birdwell since 29 May 2026
- Office of the Secretary of Defense
- Style: The Honorable (formal address in writing)
- Reports to: Under Secretary of Defense for Acquisition and Sustainment
- Appointer: The president with the advice and consent of the Senate
- Term length: No fixed term
- Formation: 12 October 2018
- Deputy: 3 deputy assistant secretaries
- Website: Official website

The assistant secretary of defense for sustainment (ASD (Sustainment)), formerly known as the assistant secretary of defense for logistics and materiel readiness (ASD(L&MR)), is one of three assistant secretaries reporting to the under secretary of defense for acquisition and sustainment. Formerly the position was an adviser to the under secretary of defense for acquisition, technology, and logistics, the deputy secretary of defense, and the secretary of defense on logistics and materiel readiness issues within the Department of Defense (DoD), including programs related to logistics, materiel readiness, maintenance, strategic mobility, and sustainment support. As the principal logistics official within the senior management of the DoD, the ASD(Sustainment) exercises authority, direction and control over the director of the Defense Logistics Agency. Like all other assistant secretaries of defense, the ASD(Sustainment) is considered a part of the Office of the Secretary of Defense.

== History ==
This position can trace its lineage partially back to the National Security Act of 1947, which established a Munitions Board to oversee logistics and supply within the nascent Defense Department. Through the Kennedy, Johnson, Nixon and Ford administrations, oversight of logistics and materiel readiness was merged with oversight of installations and properties. In 1977, the acquisition functions of this office were transferred to the director of defense research and engineering, and responsibilities for logistics were merged with manpower and reserve affairs throughout the Carter and early Reagan administrations.

For a year in the middle of the Reagan administration, responsibilities for logistics and materiel support were split between two ASDs after the creation of a new assistant secretary of defense for development and support, established by Defense Directive 5129.4 (signed 25 November 1984). However, this office was abolished after Defense Directive 5128.1 (signed in November 1985) merged logistics responsibilities into a single office, the assistant secretary of defense for acquisition and logistics. This office was then replaced by the assistant secretary of defense for production and logistics in April 1987, and phased out completely in 1993 after the reorganization of the office of the USD (AT&L). From 1993 until 2000, there was no principal staff assistant to the USD (AT&L) responsible for oversight of logistics and materiel readiness.

The National Defense Authorization Act for Fiscal Year 2000, (P.L. 106-65, signed 5 October 1999) created the new position of deputy under secretary of defense for logistics and materiel readiness, or DUSD (L&MR). The DUSD (L&MR) was meant to serve as a second DUSD, after the Principal DUSD, reporting to the USD (AT&L). According to an official DoD history, the intent of Congress in establishing the DUSD (L&MR) was to emphasize the importance of these functions.

The National Defense Authorization Act for Fiscal Year 2010 (P.L. 111-84, signed 28 October 2009) redesignated this position as the assistant secretary of defense for logistics and materiel readiness, or ASD(L&MR), as part of an overall effort to limit the number of DUSD positions to five. However, this post remained vacant throughout the Obama administration, with Principal Deputy Assistant Secretary of Defense (PDASD) Alan F. Estevez serving as the highest-ranking official in this office.

In February 2018, the Logistics and Materiel Readiness office was combined into a new office, headed by the assistant secretary for sustainment.

As part of a reorganization on 12 October 2018, the ASD(L&MR) was combined with the assistant secretary of defense for energy, installations, and environment (ASD(EI&E)) into a new assistant secretary of defense for sustainment. The ASD(EI&E) position was reestablished on February 10, 2022.

== Officeholders ==
=== Assistant secretaries for logistics and materiel readiness ===
The table below includes both the various titles of this post over time, as well as all the holders of those offices.

Assistant secretaries of defense (logistics & materiel readiness)
Name	Tenure	Secretary(ies) served under	President(s) served under
Chairman, Munitions Board
Thomas J. Hargrave	30 September 1947 – 20 September 1948	James V. Forrestal	Harry Truman
Donald F. Carpenter	21 September 1948 – 30 June 1949	James V. Forrestal; Louis A. Johnson	Harry Truman
Hubert E. Howard	25 November 1949 – 18 September 1950	Louis A. Johnson	Harry Truman
John D. Small	16 November 1950 – 20 January 1953	George C. Marshall; Robert A. Lovett	Harry Truman
Assistant Secretary of Defense (Supply and Logistics)
Charles S. Thomas	5 August 1953 – 2 May 1954	Charles Erwin Wilson	Dwight Eisenhower
Thomas P. Pike	3 May 1954 – 27 June 1956	Charles Erwin Wilson	Dwight Eisenhower
E. Perkins McGuire	28 December 1956 – 20 January 1961	Charles Erwin Wilson; Neil H. McElroy; Thomas S. Gates	Dwight Eisenhower
Assistant Secretary of Defense (Installations and Logistics)
Thomas D. Morris	29 January 1961 – 11 December 1964	Robert S. McNamara	John F. Kennedy; Lyndon Johnson
Paul R. Ignatius	23 December 1964 – 31 August 1967	Robert S. McNamara	Lyndon Johnson
Thomas D. Morris	1 September 1967 – 1 February 1969	Robert S. McNamara; Clark M. Clifford; Melvin R. Laird	Lyndon Johnson; Richard Nixon
Barry J. Shillito	1 February 1969 – 1 February 1973	Melvin R. Laird	Richard Nixon
Arthur I. Mendolia	21 June 1973 – 31 March 1975	James R. Schlesinger	Richard Nixon; Gerald Ford
John J. Bennett (acting)	1 April 1975 – 9 February 1976	James R. Schlesinger; Donald H. Rumsfeld	Gerald Ford
Frank A. Shrontz	10 February 1976 – 19 January 1977	Donald H. Rumsfeld	Gerald Ford
Assistant Secretary of Defense (Manpower, Reserve Affairs, and Logistics)
John P. White	11 May 1977 – 31 October 1978	Harold Brown	Jimmy Carter
Robert B. Pirie Jr.	17 June 1979 – 20 January 1981	Harold Brown	Jimmy Carter
Lawrence Korb	4 May 1981 – 12 January 1984	Caspar W. Weinberger	Ronald Reagan
Assistant Secretary of Defense (Manpower, Installations, and Logistics)
Lawrence J. Korb	12 January 1984 – 5 July 1985	Caspar W. Weinberger	Ronald Reagan
Assistant Secretary of Defense (Development and Support)
James P. Wade	6 August 1984 – 5 July 1985	Caspar W. Weinberger	Ronald Reagan
Assistant Secretary of Defense (Acquisition and Logistics)
James P. Wade	5 July 1985 – 3 November 1986	Caspar W. Weinberger	Ronald Reagan
Robert B. Costello	13 March 1987 – 15 April 1987	Caspar W. Weinberger	Ronald Reagan
Assistant Secretary of Defense (Production and Logistics)
Robert B. Costello	15 April 1987 – 17 December 1987	Caspar W. Weinberger; Frank C. Carlucci III	Ronald Reagan
Jack Katzen	28 March 1988 – 8 January 1990	Frank C. Carlucci III; William Howard Taft IV (acting); Dick Cheney	Ronald Reagan; George H. W. Bush
Colin McMillan	5 March 1990 – 11 December 1992	Dick Cheney	George H. W. Bush
No position
Position vacant from 1993 to 2000
Deputy Under Secretary of Defense (Logistics and Materiel Readiness)
Roger W. Kallock	15 September 2000 – 19 January 2001	William S. Cohen	Bill Clinton
Diane Morales	17 July 2001 – 2 January 2004	Donald H. Rumsfeld	George W. Bush
Bradley M. Berkson (acting)	2 January 2004 – 8 August 2005	Donald H. Rumsfeld	George W. Bush
Phillip J. "Jack" Bell	8 August 2005 – 20 January 2009	Donald H. Rumsfeld; Robert M. Gates	George W. Bush
Assistant Secretary of Defense (Logistics and Materiel Readiness)
Position vacant from 20 January 2009 to 8 August 2011
Alan Estevez	8 August 2011 – 30 October 2013	Leon Panetta; Chuck Hagel	Barack Obama
David J. Berteau	16 December 2014 – 25 March 2016	Chuck Hagel; Ash Carter	Barack Obama
Position vacant from 26 March 2016 to 30 November 2017
Robert H. McMahon	30 November 2017 – 11 October 2018	Jim Mattis	Donald Trump

=== Assistant secretaries for sustainment ===
Assistant secretaries for sustainment
Name	Tenure	Secretary(ies) served under	President(s) served under
Robert H. McMahon	12 October 2018 – 22 November 2019	Jim Mattis; Mark Esper	Donald Trump
Peter Potochney (acting)	22 November 2019 – 30 March 2020	Mark Esper	Donald Trump
Jordan Gillis	30 March 2020 – 20 January 2021	Mark Esper	Donald Trump
Paul D. Cramer (acting)	20 January 2021 – 2 August 2021	Lloyd Austin	Joe Biden
Steven J. Morani (acting)	2 August 2021 – 10 June 2022	Lloyd Austin	Joe Biden
Christopher Lowman	10 June 2022 – 30 September 2024	Lloyd Austin	Joe Biden
Steven J. Morani (acting)	30 September 2024 – 28 July 2025	Lloyd Austin; Pete Hegseth	Joe Biden; Donald Trump
Leigh E. Method (acting)	28 July 2025 – 29 May 2026	Pete Hegseth	Donald Trump
Brian Birdwell	29 May 2026 – Present	Pete Hegseth	Donald Trump
