= Beehler =

Beehler is a surname. Notable people with the surname include:

- Alex A. Beehler (fl. 1975), American professor and lawyer and former United States Government official
- Bruce Beehler (born 1951), American ornithologist
- Dan Beehler (fl. 1978), drummer for the Canadian band Exciter
