= Caral Spangler =

American government official

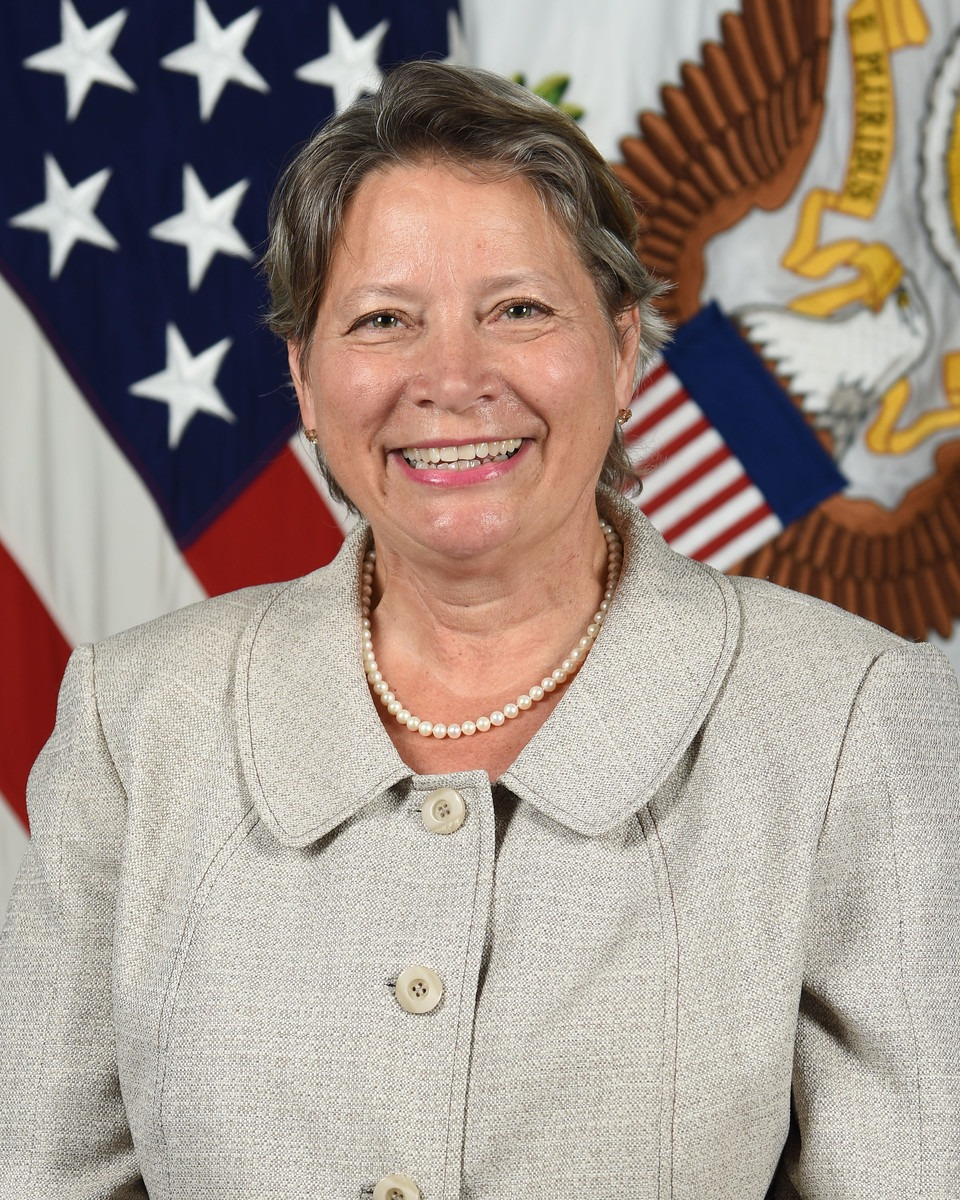

17th Assistant Secretary of the Army (Financial Management and Comptroller)
- In office August 17, 2021 – January 20, 2025
- President: Joe Biden
- Secretary: Christine Wormuth
- Preceded by: John E. Whitley
- Succeeded by: Marc A. Andersen

Personal details
- Born: Caral Elizabeth Erickson Mankato, Minnesota, U.S.
- Education: Michigan State University (BA); Syracuse University (MPA)

Caral Elizabeth Spangler (Cah-rall Span-gla) (née Erickson); is an American government official who had served as the Assistant Secretary of the Army (Financial Management and Comptroller).

== Early life and education ==
Spangler was born in Mankato, Minnesota. She earned a Bachelor of Arts degree in economics with honor from the School of Business at Michigan State University in 1980. She then obtained a Master of Public Administration degree from the Maxwell School of Citizenship and Public Affairs at Syracuse University in 1981.

== Career ==
Spangler began her career in the office of the Assistant Secretary of the Navy (Financial Management and Comptroller). She then worked in the office of the Under Secretary of Defense (Comptroller) and as a legislative aide for Congressman Norman Mineta of California. She later worked in the offices of the Assistant Secretary of the Air Force, and Assistant Secretary of the Army (Financial Management and Comptroller), specializing in finance and budget issues. She served as acting auditor general of the United States Navy, acting assistant secretary of the United States Army, and Assistant Deputy Commandant for Program and Resources with the US Marine Corps.

=== Army Nomination ===
President Joe Biden nominated Spangler as Assistant Secretary of the Army (Financial Management and Comptroller) on June 3, 2021. She was approved the Senate Armed Services Committee on August 7 and confirmed by the entire Senate on August 9 by voice vote. She was sworn in on August 17, 2021.

Government offices
Preceded by John E. Whitley	Assistant Secretary of the Army (Financial Management and Comptroller); 2021–present	Incumbent
