= Hammack =

Hammack is a surname. Notable people with the surname include:

- Beth M. Hammack (born 1971/1972), American financial executive
- Bill Hammack (born 1961), American chemical engineer and professor
- Bobby Hammack (1922–1990), American musician
- Caylee Hammack (born 1994), American singer-songwriter
- Craig Hammack, American special effects supervisor
- Katherine Hammack (born 1959), American government official
- Mal Hammack (1933–2004), American college and professional football player
- William S. Hammack (born 1961), American chemical engineer

== See also ==
- Ruth Hammack Alexander, American activist
