= Rachel Jacobson =

American government official

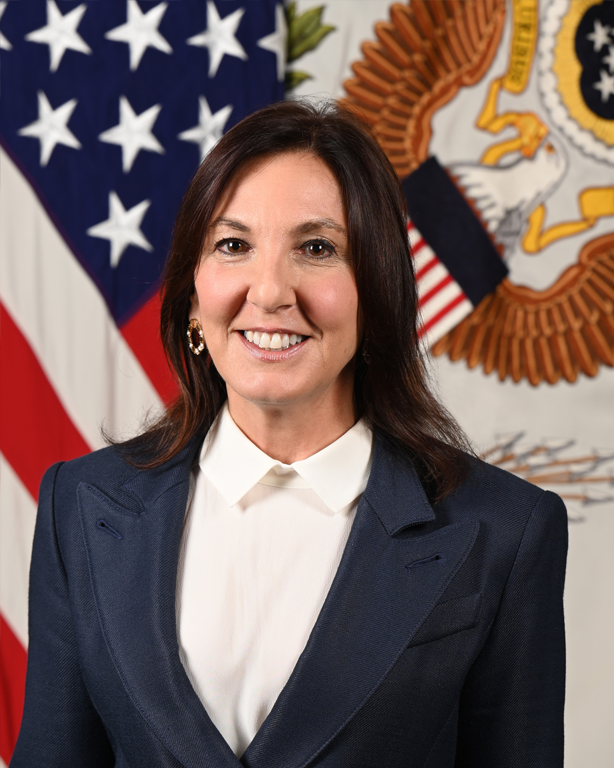

9th Assistant Secretary of the Army for Installations, Energy and Environment
- In office April 4, 2022 – January 20, 2025
- President: Joe Biden
- Secretary: Christine Wormuth
- Preceded by: Alex A. Beehler
- Succeeded by: Jordan Gillis

Personal details
- Education: Washington University in St. Louis (BA); Boston University (JD)

Rachel Jacobson is an American attorney and government official who had served the assistant secretary of the Army for installations, energy and environment in the Biden administration.

== Early life and education ==
Jacobson is a native of Chicago, Illinois. She earned a Bachelor of Arts degree in economics from the Washington University in St. Louis and a Juris Doctor from the Boston University School of Law.

== Career ==
From 1990 to 2008, Jacobson worked as a senior attorney in the United States Department of Justice Environment and Natural Resources Division. She then worked as the director of the National Fish and Wildlife Foundation for impact directed environmental accounts from 2008 to 2009 before joining the United States Department of the Interior. From 2009 to 2011, she served as principal deputy solicitor of the interior and as acting assistant secretary of the interior for fish and wildlife and parks from May 2011 to August 2014. From August 2014 to December 2016, she served as general counsel for environment, energy, and installations in the United States Department of Defense. She joined Wilmer Cutler Pickering Hale and Dorr in 2017 as special counsel.
