= Robert McMahon =

Robert McMahon may refer to:

- Robert McMahon (footballer) (born 1977), Australian rules footballer
- Robert J. McMahon (born 1949), American historian
- Robert H. McMahon, United States Air Force general and government official
- Bobby McMahon, Scottish football (soccer) analyst in Canada
- Bob McMahon, lacrosse coach
- Robert Carrier (chef) (Robert Carrier McMahon, 1923–2006), American chef, restaurateur and cookery writer
- Robert McMahon, suspect in the Lufthansa heist
