= John E. Whitley =

American government official (born 1970)

John Whitley
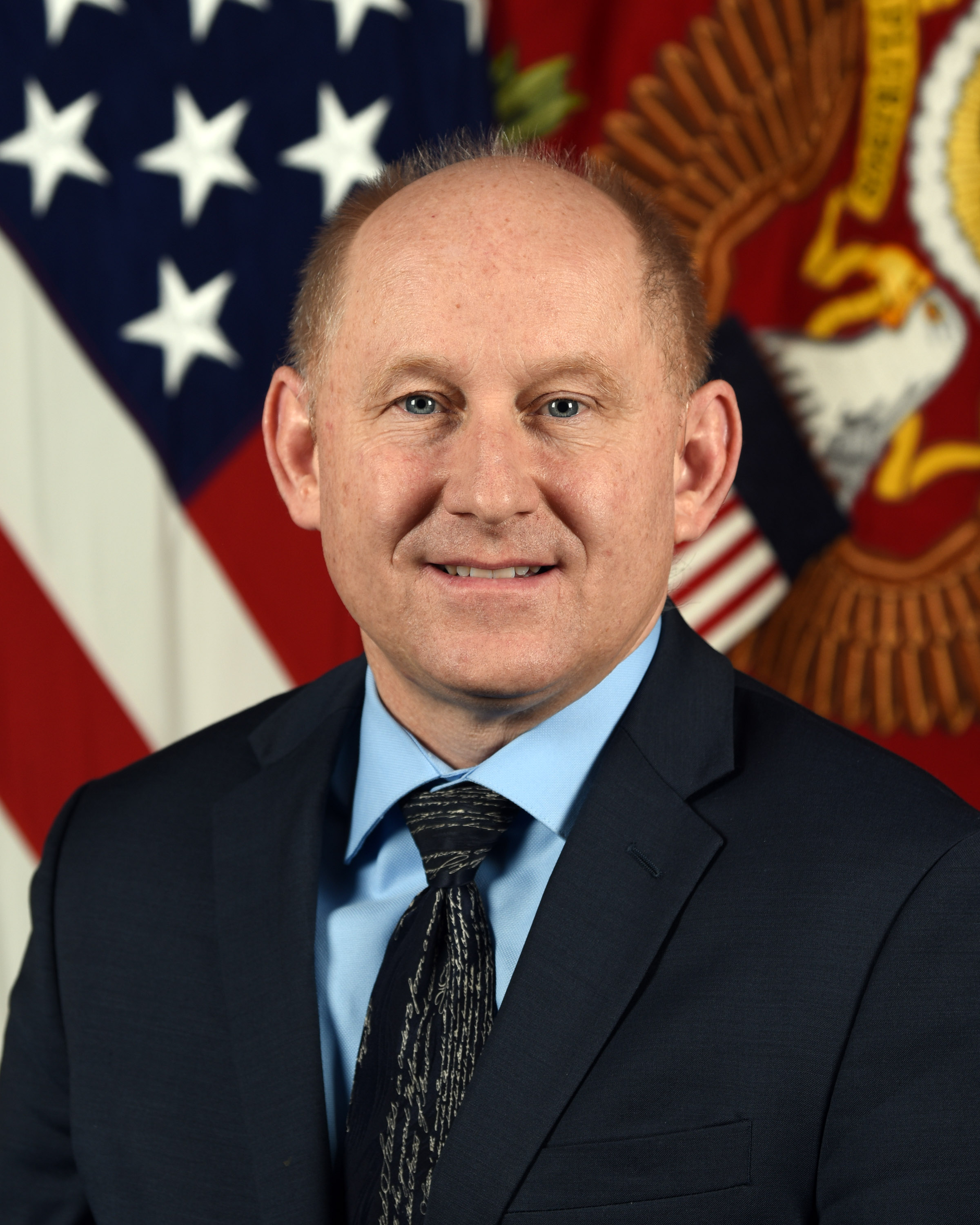
- Official portrait, 2021

Acting United States Secretary of the Army
- In office January 20, 2021 – May 28, 2021
- President: Joe Biden
- Deputy: Christopher Lowman (acting)
- Preceded by: Ryan D. McCarthy
- Succeeded by: Christine Wormuth

16th Assistant Secretary of the Army (Financial Management and Comptroller)
- In office September 26, 2018 – January 20, 2021
- President: Donald Trump
- Preceded by: Robert M. Speer
- Succeeded by: Caral Spangler

Acting Director of Cost Assessment and Program Evaluation
- In office August 16, 2019 – March 13, 2020
- President: Donald Trump; Joe Biden
- Preceded by: E. Y. (Yisroel) Brumer (acting)
- Succeeded by: Joseph R. Nogueira (Acting)

Personal details
- Born: September 15, 1970 (age 55) Gainesville, Florida, U.S.
- Party: Republican
- Education: Virginia Tech (BA, BS); University of Chicago (MA, PhD)

Military service
- Allegiance: United States
- Branch/service: United States Army
- Years of service: 1988–1992
- Rank: Sergeant
- Unit: 2nd Ranger Battalion

John Euler Whitley (born September 15, 1970) is an American government official who served as the acting United States Secretary of the Army from January 20, 2021, to May 28, 2021. He previously serviced as Assistant Secretary of the Army (Financial Management and Comptroller) and acting director of cost assessment and program evaluation for the Department of Defense.

== Early life and education ==
Whitley was born in Gainesville, Florida, and grew up in Clear Spring, Maryland.

Whitley served in the United States Army from 1988 until 1992. He served in the 2nd Ranger Battalion and completed numerous courses, including Ranger School, the Ranger Indoctrination Program, and the Special Operations Medical Course.

He graduated from Virginia Tech in 1996 with a Bachelor of Science in animal science and a Bachelors of Arts degree in agricultural economics. Whitley graduated summa cum laude and was the outstanding senior in the College of Agricultural and Life Sciences. He went on to the University of Chicago, where he earned a master's degree and a Ph.D. in Economics in 2000.

Upon completing his Ph.D. in economics, Whitley worked in the economics department of the University of Adelaide in Australia. At Adelaide, Whitley taught various courses on microeconomics topics and published research in on agricultural economics and law and economics topics.

== Government service ==
Whitley then worked in the Department of Defense (DoD), Office of the Secretary of Defense, Program Analysis and Evaluation (PA&E) as an operations research analyst (which was subsequently renamed to Cost Assessment and Program Evaluation (CAPE)). At PA&E, Whitley worked on defense resource allocation and military healthcare. In 2007, Whitley worked in the office of Jon Kyl, a former U.S. Senator from Arizona.

Whitley left DoD for the Department of Homeland Security (DHS) in the office of the CFO. He was the director of DHS PA&E and the DHS Performance Improvement Officer. In these roles, he led the resource allocation process and the measurement, reporting and improvement of performance. At DHS, Whitley worked on counterterrorism, immigration, cybersecurity and disaster management issues.

Whitley then served as a senior fellow at the Institute for Defense Analyses (IDA) in Alexandria, Virginia. At IDA, he led research on resource allocation and performance issues in national security, including military healthcare and border security. He supported the Military Compensation and Retirement Modernization Commission on healthcare reform and has testified before Congress on these issues. He also served as a senior fellow at the Center for Naval Analyses and taught as an adjunct professor at the Trachtenberg School of Public Policy and Public Administration at George Washington University.

On February 1, 2018, President Donald Trump nominated Whitley to be Assistant Secretary of the Army (Financial Management and Comptroller). On September 18, 2018, the United States Senate confirmed his nomination by voice vote; he was sworn in the same day. Whitley served as the Chief Financial Officer (CFO) of the U.S. Army, in charge of financial management, audit, and budgetary issue for the $180 billion Army budget.

From August 16, 2019, through March 13, 2020, Whitley was acting director of cost assessment and program evaluation (CAPE) for DoD. He then moved to the role of performing the duties of the director of CAPE from March 13, 2020, through May 4, 2020. As the director of CAPE, Whitley served in roles similar to the Chief Strategy Officer and Chief Investment Officer of the DoD. On May 4, 2020, he was nominated to assume this post. While awaiting confirmation, Whitley served as the acting deputy chief management officer of the DoD. On January 3, 2021, his nomination was returned to the president under Rule XXXI, Paragraph 6 of the United States Senate.

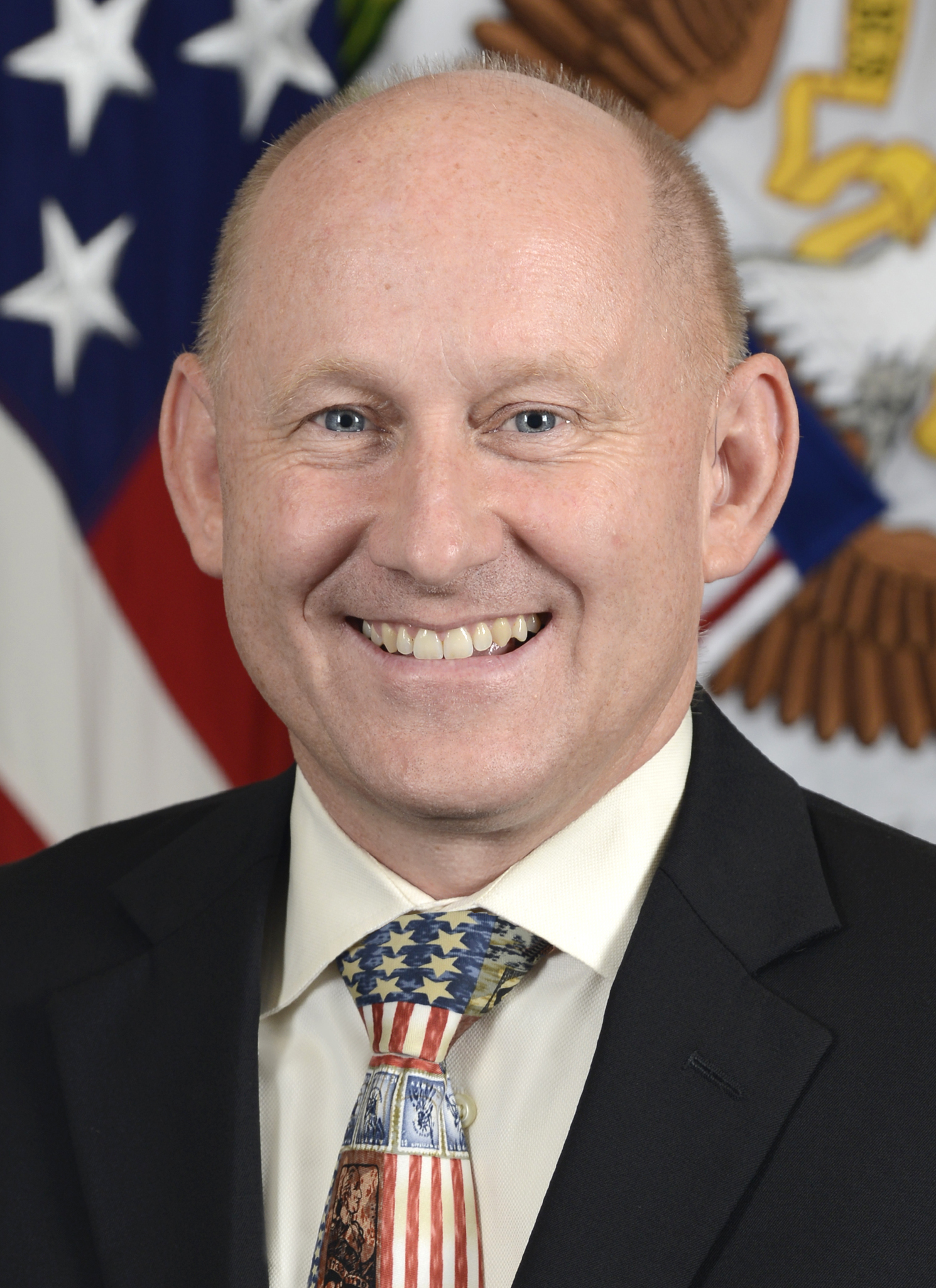
Whitley in 2018 as Assistant Secretary of the Army

President Joe Biden appointed Whitley as the acting Secretary of the Army. In the role, Whitley functioned as the CEO of the Department of the Army, including its more than one million military personnel, 200,000 civilians, and $180 billion annual budget. During his tenure, Whitley advocated for Army modernization efforts, increased the focus in readiness on small-unit training, directed a major restructuring of the U.S. Army Criminal Investigation Command, oversaw the National Guardsmen stationed in Washington, D.C. (including the 25,000 in place for the inauguration on January 20, 2021), and developed the 2022 Army budget. On May 5, 2021, Whitley testified to the United States House Appropriations Subcommittee on Defense on the Fiscal Year 2022 Army Budget.

== Personal life ==
Whitley lives in Alexandria, Virginia, with his wife, Danielle, and their two children. His son serves in the Army.

== Publications ==
=== Some academic works ===
Whitley, J.; Bishop, J.; Burns, S.; Guerrera, K.; Lurie, P.; Rieksts, B.; Roberts, B.; Wojtecki, T.; Wu, L. (2018). “Medical Total Force Management: Assessing Readiness and Cost” IDA Paper P-8805

Whitley, J. (2017). “Five Actions to Improve Military Hospital Performance”. IBM Center for The Business of Government.

Whitley, J. (2015). “Four Actions to Integrate Performance Information with Budget Formulation”. IBM Center for The Business of Government.

Roberts, B.; Whitley, J.; and Valdes-Dapena, M. (2014). “Economics of Federal Law Enforcement,” in Payson S. (ed). "Public Economics in the United States: How the Federal Government Analyzes and Influences the Economy". 1: Praeger.

Whitley, J. (2013) “Managing Illegal Immigration to the United States: How Effective is Enforcement?” Council on Foreign Relations Special Report.

Arnold, S.; Harmon, B.; Rose, S.; Whitley, J. (2013). “The Value of an Economic Price Adjustment Clause”. Defense Acquisition Research Journal. 20 (2): 174–193.

Whitley, J. (2012). “Five Methods for Measuring Unobserved Events: A Case Study of Federal Law Enforcement”. IBM Center for The Business of Government.

Political offices
Preceded by Ryan D. McCarthy	United States Secretary of the Army; Acting; 2021	Succeeded by Christine Wormuth
