= Mario P. Fiori =

American government official (born 1941)

Mario P Fiori
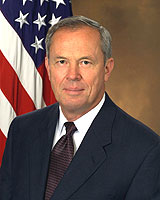

Assistant Secretary of the Army for Installations, Energy and Environment
- In office August 13, 2001 – December 15, 2003
- President: George W. Bush
- Preceded by: Mahlon Apgar IV
- Succeeded by: Keith E. Eastin

Personal details
- Born: Guenter Georg Kohl; December 14, 1941 (age 83); Frankfurt am Main, Germany
- Education: United States Naval Academy (BS); Massachusetts Institute of Technology (MS)(PhD)

Mario Peter Fiori (born Guenter Georg Kohl; December 14, 1941) served as United States Assistant Secretary of the Army (Installations, Energy and Environment) from 2001 to 2003.

== Biography ==
Fiori was born in Germany during World War II and raised in Brooklyn. His stepfather Silvano Louis Fiori adopted him in 1951 after marrying his mother Anne Marie Kohl in 1948. He attended the United States Naval Academy, graduating with a B.S. in June 1963. He also received an M.S. in mechanical engineering and a Nuclear Engineer degree in September 1966 and a Ph.D. in nuclear engineering in February 1969 from the Massachusetts Institute of Technology.

Fiori served in the United States Navy from 1963 to 1989. He retired as commander of the Naval Underwater Systems Center having attained the rank of captain.

In 1991, Fiori served as the United States Department of Energy's Departmental Representative to the Defense Nuclear Facilities Safety Board. From 1993 to 1997, he was Manager of the Department of Energy's Savannah River Site. Upon leaving the Department of the Energy, in 1998, Fiori founded a consulting firm, Compass Associates, Inc., focused on safety, health, and environmental consulting.

In July 2001, President of the United States George W. Bush nominated Fiori to be Assistant Secretary of the Army (Installations, Energy and Environment). After Senate confirmation, he held this office from August 2001 to January 2004.

After leaving the United States Department of the Army, Fiori returned to Compass Associates, Inc.
