= Barry J. Shillito =

American businessman and government official

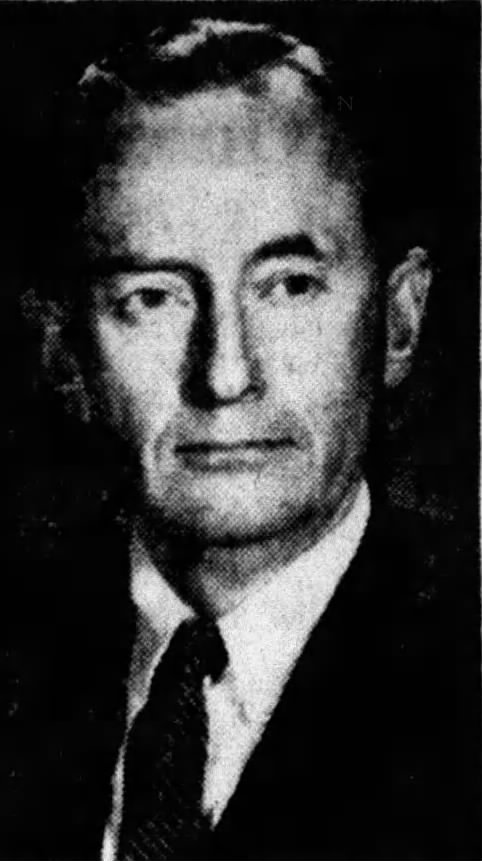
- Shillito in 1969

Assistant Secretary of Defense for Installations and Logistics
- In office February 1, 1969 – February 1, 1973
- President: Richard Nixon
- Preceded by: Thomas D. Morris
- Succeeded by: Hugh McCullough (acting); Arthur I. Mendolia

Personal details
- Born: Barry James Shillito; January 1, 1921 Dayton, Ohio, U.S.
- Died: January 24, 2016 (aged 95)
- Spouse: Eileen Cottman (m. 1942)
- Education: University of Dayton
- Occupation: Businessman, government official

Barry J. Shillito (January 1, 1921 – January 24, 2016), also known as Barry James Shillito, was an American businessman and government official.

== Life and career ==
Shillito was born in Dayton, Ohio. He attended Chaminade High School and the University of Dayton. He was an army air corps pilot during World War II.

Shillito was president of the Logistics Management Institute during the 1960s.

In 1969, President Richard Nixon appointed Shillito to serve as Assistant Secretary of Defense for Installations and Logistics. He served until 1971, when he was succeeded by Hugh McCullough.

Shillito died in January 2016, at the age of 95.
