= Thomas J. Hargrave =

American business executive and lawyer

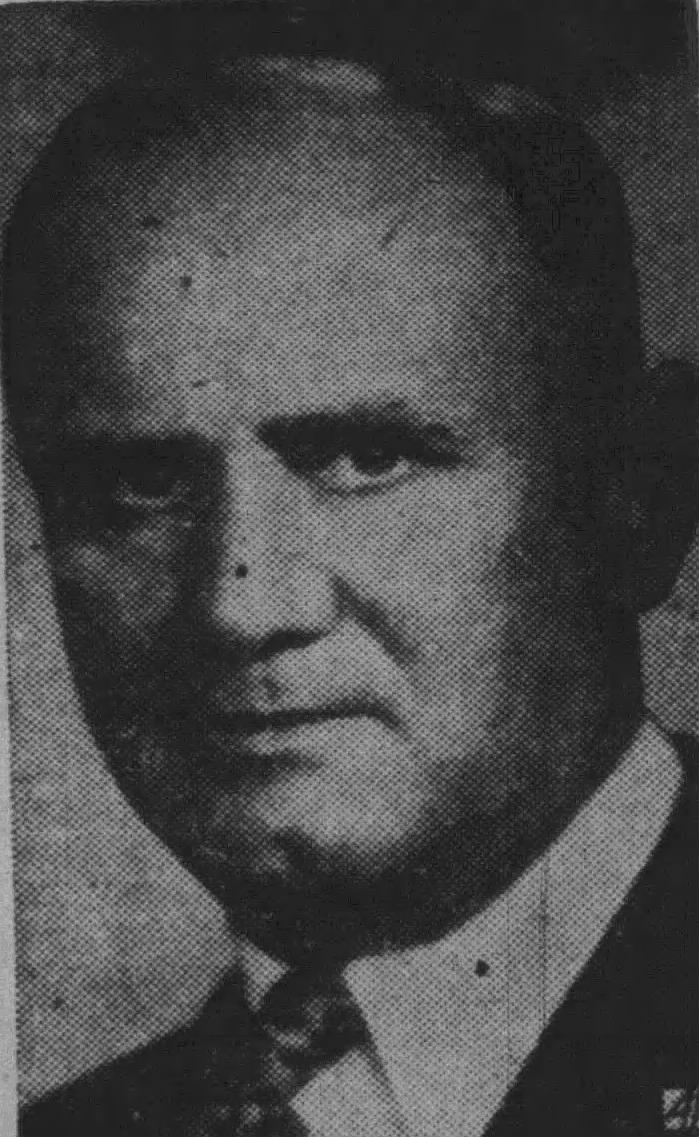
- Hargrave in 1947

Chairman of the Munitions Board
- In office September 30, 1947 – September 20, 1948
- President: Harry S. Truman
- Preceded by: Position established
- Succeeded by: Donald F. Carpenter

Personal details
- Born: Thomas Jean Hargrave; December 5, 1891 Wymore, Nebraska, U.S.
- Died: February 21, 1962 (aged 70)
- Education: University of Nebraska; Harvard Law School
- Occupation: Business executive, lawyer

Thomas Jean Hargrave (December 5, 1891 – February 21, 1962) was an American business executive and lawyer.

== Life and career ==
Hargrave was born in Wymore, Nebraska. He attended the University of Nebraska and Harvard Law School.

Hargrave was president of Eastman Kodak Company during the 1940s.

In 1947, President Harry S. Truman appointed Hargrave to serve as chairman of the Munitions Board. He resigned in 1948 and was succeeded by Donald F. Carpenter.

Hargrave died on February 21, 1962, at the age of 70.
