= Mahlon Apgar IV =

American business and government consultant

Sandy Apgar IV
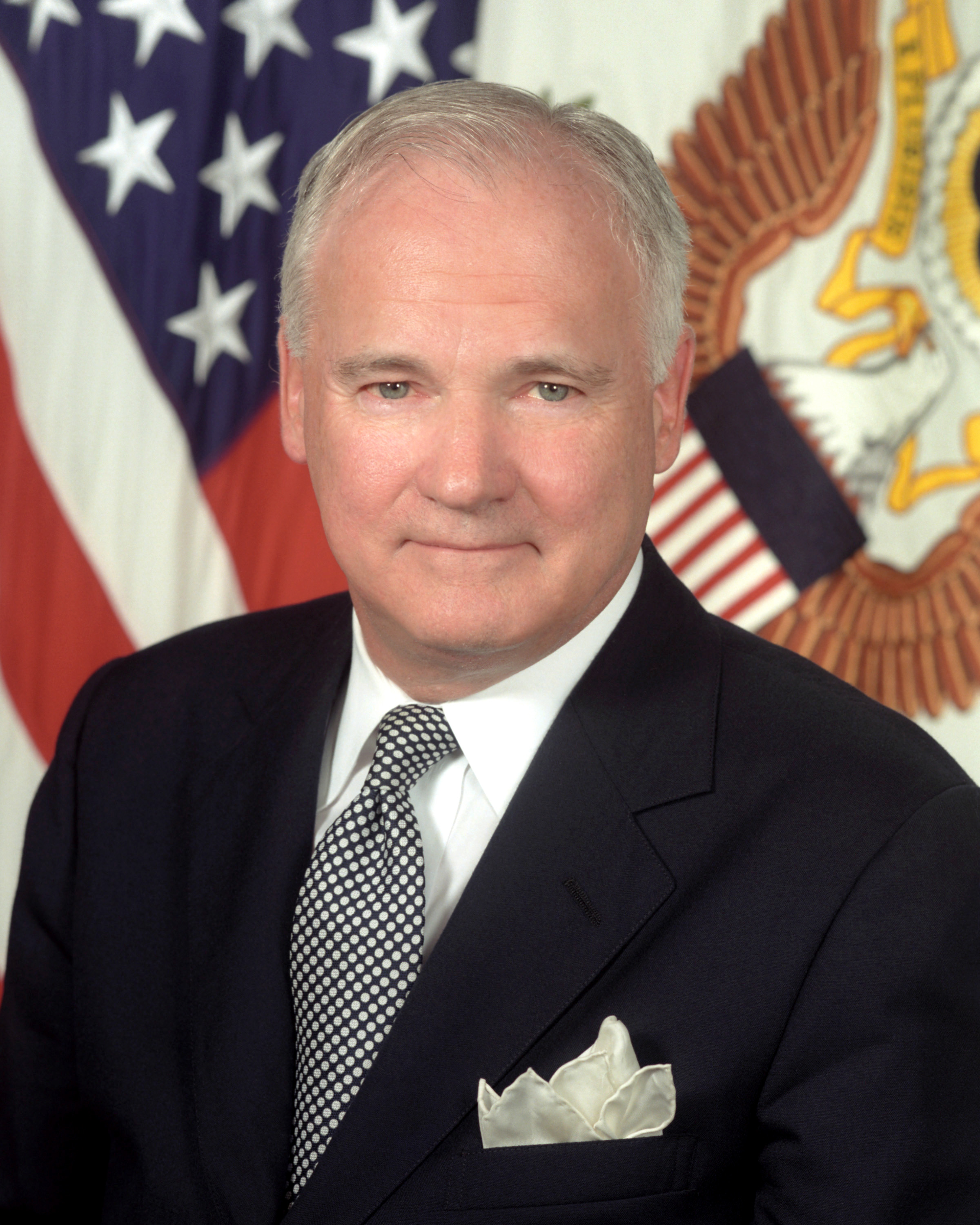

Assistant Secretary of the Army for Installations, Energy and Environment
- In office June 9, 1998 – January 20, 2001
- President: Bill Clinton
- Preceded by: Robert M. Walker
- Succeeded by: Mario P. Fiori

Personal details
- Born: January 14, 1941
- Died: December 11, 2023; Boston, Massachusetts, U.S.
- Education: Dartmouth College (BA); Magdalen College, Oxford; Harvard Business School (MBA)

Mahlon "Sandy" Apgar IV (January 14, 1941 – December 11, 2023) was an American government and business consultant. He served as a housing, infrastructure, and real estate consultant to global corporations and government agencies, and a non-resident Senior Advisor at the Center for Strategic and International Studies (CSIS). He is known as the "father" of the United States Army's housing privatization program, the largest such public-private partnership program in the Department of Defense. He was a partner and senior advisor at the Boston Consulting Group (BCG), and a partner at McKinsey & Company where he led its operations in Saudi Arabia, and a Senior Scholar at the Woodrow Wilson International Center for Scholars where he wrote the playbook on public-private partnerships.

== Education and military service ==
Born in Paterson, New Jersey, Apgar graduated from Blair Academy in 1958, and in 1962 received a BA in Sociology from Dartmouth College, where he was a Choate Scholar and a Distinguished Military Graduate of Army ROTC. He spent his senior year with the Dartmouth-MIT Program In Urban Studies, examining Boston's cultural institutions as paths to upward mobility. As a member of Delta Tau Delta fraternity, he helped lead the chapter's break from the national organization due to its discriminatory admissions policy. In 1962, he was commissioned in the US Army and served as an intelligence officer covering the East-West German border until 1965. The following year, he studied the British New Towns program at Oxford University. In 1968, he received an MBA from the Harvard Business School, as a National Fellow and Executive Editor of The MBA magazine.

== Consulting career ==
Apgar began his real estate career with the developer James W. Rouse, and assisted in opening the new city of Columbia, Maryland. In 1968, he joined McKinsey, transferring to London in 1970, where he consulted on British and European housing, real estate, urban development, and local government issues. He wrote policy guidelines called The Sunderland Study: Tackling Urban Problems for the UK government, and advised private firms on real estate strategy. In 1974, he began a five-year engagement in Saudi Arabia, leading planning teams for Saudi Aramco's large-scale community development and infrastructure expansion, and co-authoring a blueprint for the Saudi government's national urbanization strategy. In 1980, he founded Apgar & Company, an advisory firm specializing in large-scale corporate real estate strategy and management. In 1997, he patented a corporate real estate evaluation system known as the Apgar Real Estate Score.

In 1998, President Bill Clinton appointed him Assistant Secretary of the Army for Installations and Environment, with global responsibility for the Army's housing, real estate and facilities. In that role, he established the Residential Communities Initiative (RCI) to privatize military housing, and led negotiations for the Army with the National Trust for Historic Preservation to restructure the management of 70,000 historic military properties. From 2002 to 2006, Apgar was a partner and director of BCG, where he established the Infrastructure and Real Estate practice. He was the firm's senior advisor on real estate from 2007 to 2011. He has advised over 200 companies, institutions and governments in 13 countries on some 600 projects, including Irvine and Playa Vista, California; Brandermill, Virginia; Disney World; Hull, London, and Sunderland in the United Kingdom; the Villes Nouvelles in France; and business new communities in Japan.

== Affiliations, publications, awards ==
Apgar is a Counselor of Real Estate, a Member of the Business Executives for National Security Advisory Board, a Fellow of the Royal Institution of Chartered Surveyors, the Institute of Directors, and the Royal Society of Arts, a Trustee of the Urban Land Institute, and a Governor of the ULI Foundation. He has taught courses at Harvard, Oxford, Princeton, and Yale. He has edited two books, including New Perspectives on Community Development, and authored more than 150 publications, including feature articles for the Harvard Business Review. Apgar received the Army's Decoration for Distinguished Civilian Service, the first Chairman's Award of the President's Advisory Council on Historic Preservation and the Arthur A. May Award of the American Institute of Real Estate Appraisers, now The Appraisal Institute. He received the William S. Ballard Award and is the only two-time recipient of the James Felt Award for Creative Counseling, both from the Counselors of Real Estate. He and his wife, Anne, established a teaching excellence awards program in 1982.
