= Arthur I. Mendolia =

American chemical engineer and government official

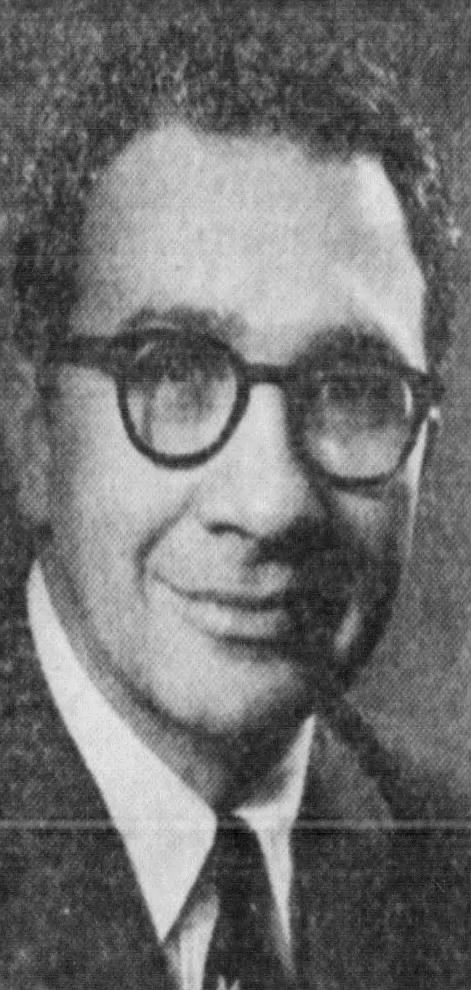
- Mendolia in 1973

Assistant Secretary of Defense for Installations and Logistics
- In office June 21, 1973 – March 31, 1975
- President: Richard Nixon; Gerald Ford
- Preceded by: Barry J. Shillito; Hugh McCullough (acting)
- Succeeded by: John J. Bennett (acting)

Personal details
- Born: May 6, 1917 Brooklyn, New York, U.S.
- Died: October 19, 2007 (aged 90) Wilmington, Delaware, U.S.
- Party: Republican
- Education: Case Institute of Technology
- Occupation: Chemical engineer, government official

Arthur I. Mendolia (May 6, 1917 – October 19, 2007) was an American chemical engineer and government official.

== Life and career ==
Mendolia was born in Brooklyn. He attended Case Institute of Technology, earning his Bachelor of Science degree in 1941.

Mendolia was a member of the American Chemical Society and the American Institute of Chemical Engineers.

In 1973, President Richard Nixon nominated Mendolia to serve as Assistant Secretary of Defense for Installations and Logistics. He served until 1975, when he was succeeded by John J. Bennett.

Mendolia died on October 19, 2007, in Wilmington, Delaware, at the age of 90.
