= Jordan Gillis =

American government official

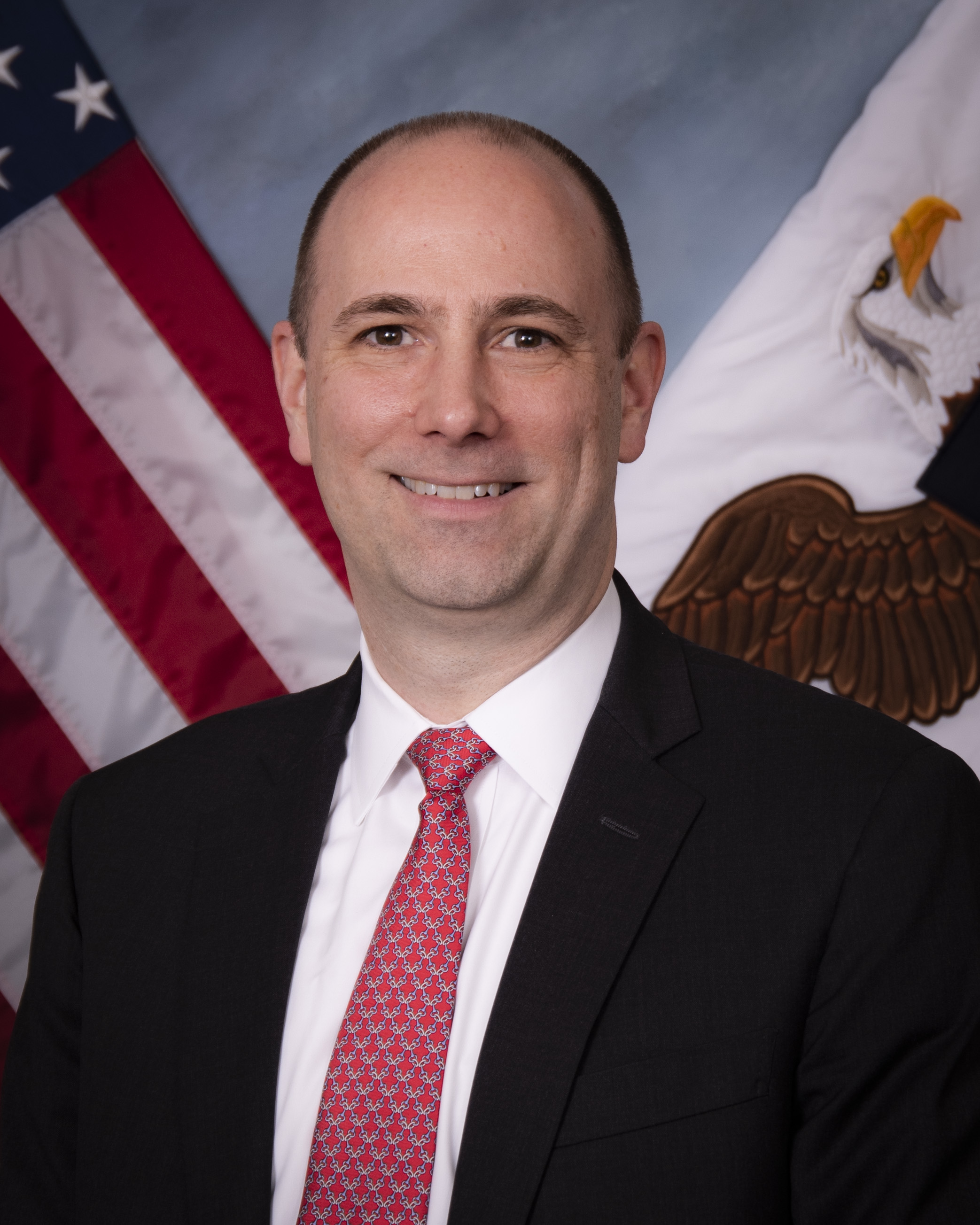
- Official portrait, 2020

Assistant Secretary of the Army for Installations, Energy and Environment
- Incumbent
- Assumed office October 6, 2025
- President: Donald Trump
- Preceded by: Rachel Jacobson

Assistant Secretary of Defense for Sustainment
- In office March 30, 2020 – January 20, 2021
- President: Donald Trump
- Preceded by: Robert H. McMahon
- Succeeded by: Christopher Lowman

Personal details
- Education: Duke University (BA); Emory University (MBA)

Military service
- Allegiance: United States
- Branch/service: United States Army
- Rank: Major
- Awards: Bronze Star; Purple Heart; Army Commendation Medal; Army Achievement Medal

William Jordan Gillis is an American government official who is serving as the Assistant Secretary of the Army for Installations, Energy and Environment. He had previously served as Assistant Secretary of Defense for Sustainment. He also served as Principal Deputy Assistant Secretary of the Army for Installations, Energy and Environment (ASA IE&E), and earlier as the acting Assistant Secretary of the Army for Installations, Energy and Environment from October 16, 2017, until January 10, 2019.

== Biography ==
A native of Atlanta, Gillis is an Eagle Scout. He earned a B.A. from Duke University and an M.B.A. from Emory University 's Goizueta Business School.

He served as a field artillery officer in the U.S. Army at posts including Fort Stewart, Georgia, and Ar Ramadi, Iraq, where he was promoted to major. His awards include the Bronze Star Medal, Purple Heart, Army Commendation Medal, and Army Achievement Medal.

Gillis was a director in the energy practice at ScottMadden, a general management consulting firm. His consulting experience focused on working for electric utility clients across North America in mergers and acquisition integration, business plan development, operational assessments, organization design and staffing, and implementation of departmental and corporate strategy. He also served on the board of Georgia Public Broadcasting and was an active scouting volunteer.

In February 2020, President Donald Trump announced his intention to nominate Gillis to be the next assistant secretary of defense for sustainment. He appeared before the Senate Committee on Armed Services on March 10, 2020, and was confirmed by voice vote of the full Senate on March 26.

On March 31, 2025, President Donald Trump nominated Gillis to be the assistant secretary of the army for installations, energy and environment.

== Personal life ==
Gillis is married and has two children.
