= Christopher Lowman =

German-American government official

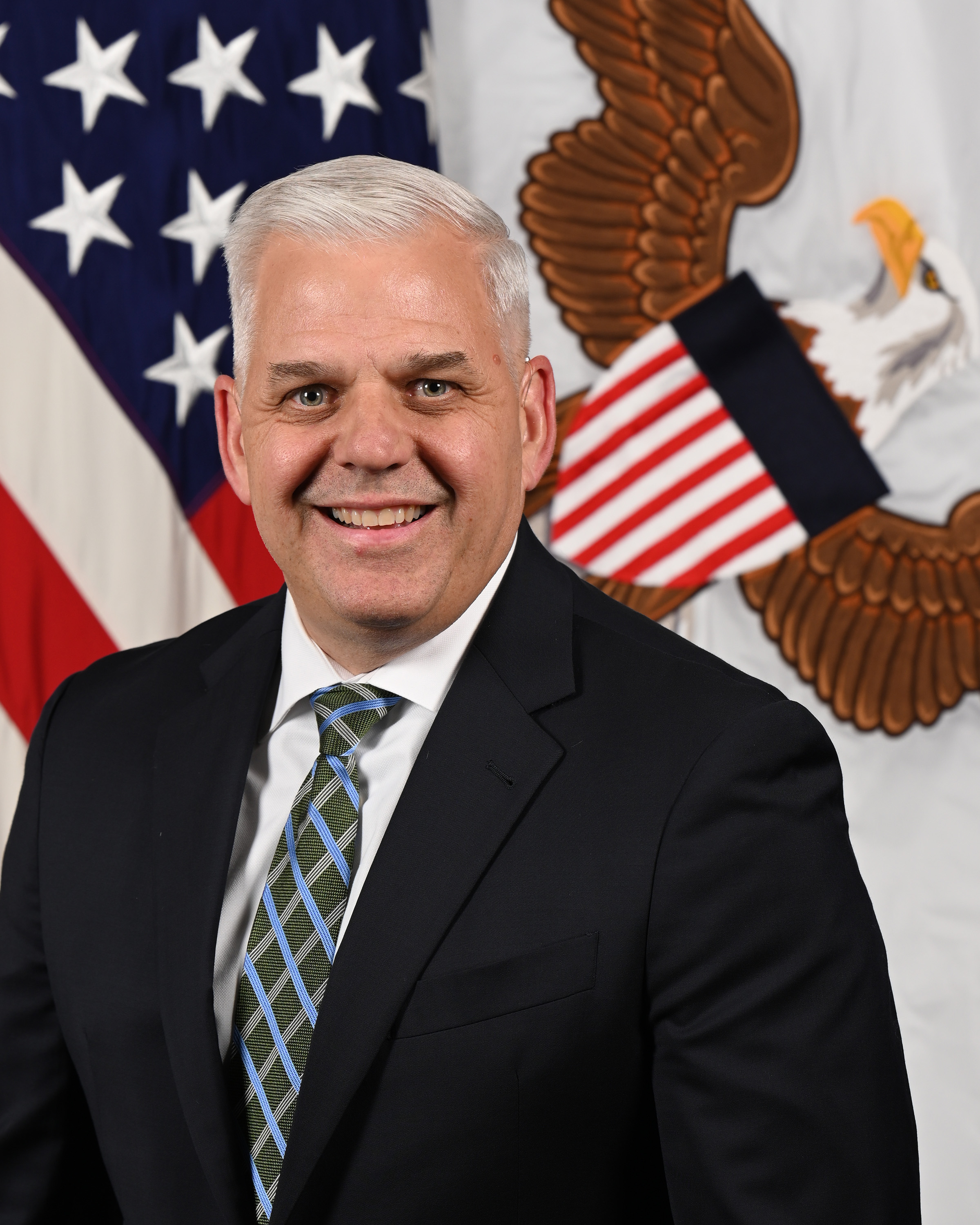

Assistant Secretary of Defense for Sustainment
- In office June 10, 2022 – September 30, 2024
- President: Joe Biden
- Preceded by: Jordan Gillis
- Succeeded by: Brian Birdwell

Acting United States Under Secretary of the Army
- In office January 20, 2021 – February 7, 2022
- President: Joe Biden
- Preceded by: James E. McPherson
- Succeeded by: Gabriel Camarillo

Personal details
- Born: Hanau, West Germany
- Spouse: Tracey Lowman
- Children: 4
- Education: Monmouth University (BS, MBA); National War College (MS)

Military service
- Branch/service: United States Marine Corps

Christopher Joseph Lowman is an American military official who had served as the Assistant Secretary of Defense for Sustainment. He previously served as the acting Under Secretary of the Army from 2021 to 2022.

== Early life and education ==
Lowman was born in Hanau, Germany, where his father was a civilian employee of the United States Army. Raised primarily in Germany, he later attended Thomas A. Edison High School in Alexandria, Virginia. He earned a Bachelor of Science degree in business administration and management from Monmouth University, a Master of Business Administration from the Leon Hess Business School at Monmouth, and a Master of Science in national security strategy from National War College.

== Career ==
Lowman enlisted in the United States Marine Corps in 1984 and went to recruit training at Parris Island, South Carolina. He then served at Marine Corps Air Station Yuma, Arizona. After leaving the Marine Corps, he joined the Army as a civilian in 1989, where he was first assigned to Fort Monmouth.

From 2003 to 2006, Lowman served as chief of the United States Army Sustainment Operations Division. He also served as director of operational sustainment for the Combined Security Transition Command – Afghanistan. Lowman has served in various civilian roles in the United States Army, including deputy director of logistics operations and readiness, director of maintenance policy and programs, deputy assistant secretary of the Army, assistant deputy chief of staff, and acting under secretary. Lowman retired on September 30, 2024.
