= Thomas P. Pike =

American businessman (1909–1993)

Thomas P. Pike (August 12, 1909 – July 30, 1993) was an industrialist who founded California's largest oil drilling contracting firm and was an advocate for those suffering from alcohol and drug addiction.

Pike was born in Los Angeles, California and received his bachelor's degree in 1931 from Stanford University, where he would later serve as chairman of the board of trustees. In 1938 he formed the Thomas P. Pike Drilling Company which he headed until 1953 when he served as chairman of the Republican Finance Committee for the state of California. Shortly thereafter he was appointed Assistant Secretary of Defense and from 1957 to 1958 was a Special Assistant to the Secretary of Defense. He also served as a Special Assistant to President Dwight D. Eisenhower in 1956 and 1958. Pike also founded and directed the Alcoholism Council of Greater Los Angeles.
