= Ryan D. McCarthy =

American business executive and former Army Ranger

Ryan McCarthy
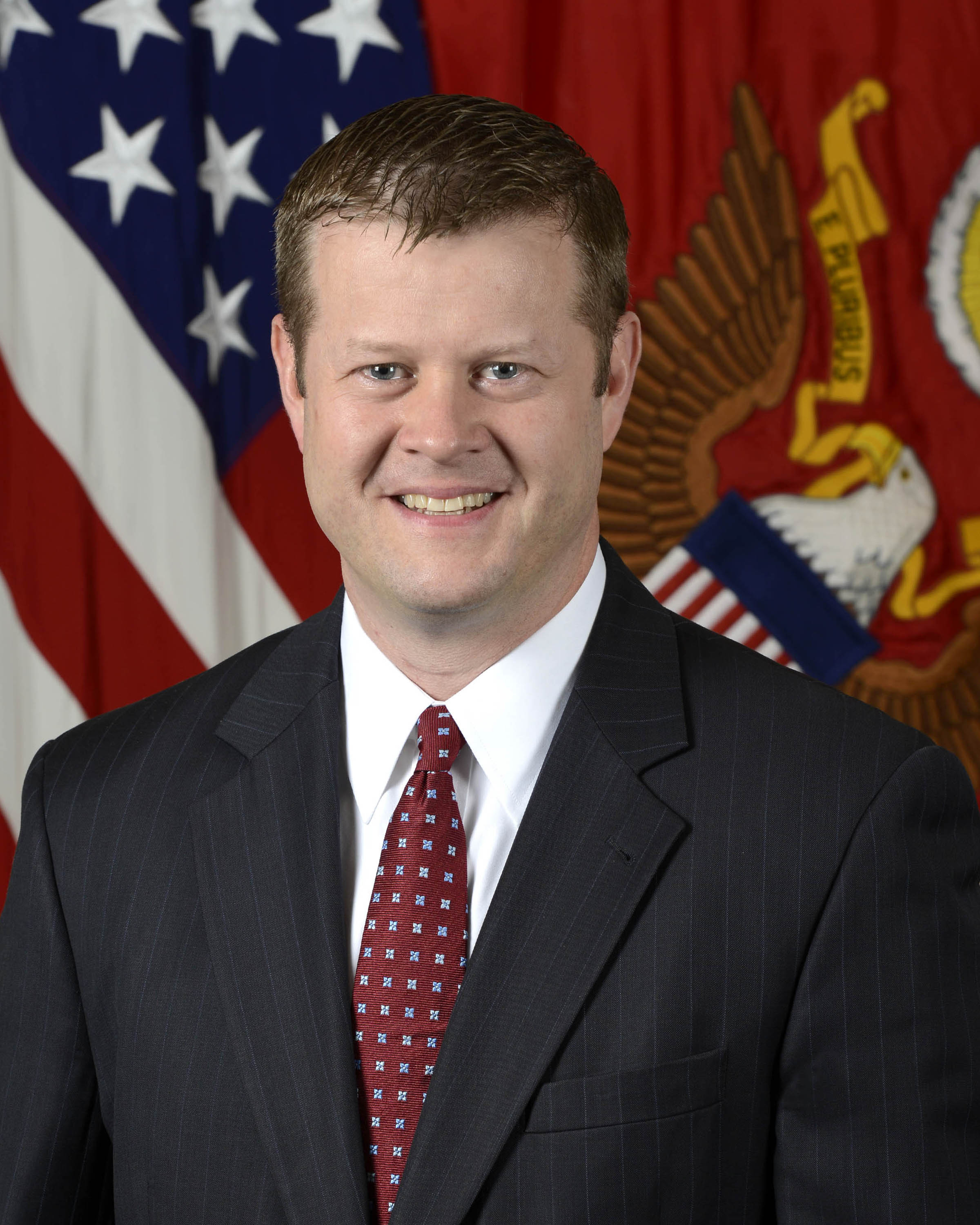
- Official portrait, 2017

24th United States Secretary of the Army
- In office September 30, 2019 – January 20, 2021; Acting: July 23, 2019 – September 30, 2019
- President: Donald Trump
- Deputy: James E. McPherson
- Preceded by: Mark Esper
- Succeeded by: Christine E. Wormuth
- In office June 24, 2019 – July 15, 2019; Acting
- President: Donald Trump
- Preceded by: Mark Esper
- Succeeded by: Mark Esper*
- In office August 3, 2017 – November 20, 2017; Acting
- President: Donald Trump
- Preceded by: Robert M. Speer (acting)
- Succeeded by: Mark Esper

33rd United States Under Secretary of the Army
- In office August 3, 2017 – September 30, 2019
- President: Donald Trump
- Preceded by: Brad Carson
- Succeeded by: James E. McPherson

Personal details
- Born: 1973 or 1974 (age 52–53)
- Education: Virginia Military Institute; University of Maryland, College Park
- Awards: Combat Infantryman Badge

Military service
- Branch/service: United States Army
- Years of service: 1997–2002
- Rank: Captain
- Unit: 75th Ranger Regiment
- Battles/wars: War in Afghanistan
- *McCarthy served in an acting capacity until Esper's formal nomination to be Secretary of Defense was submitted to the Senate. While McCarthy served as Acting Army Secretary, McPherson served as Acting Under Secretary.

Ryan D. McCarthy (born 1973 or 1974) is an American business executive and former U.S. Army Ranger who served as the 24th United States Secretary of the Army, from 2019 to 2021. He previously held the office in an acting capacity in 2017 and 2019.

== Education and military service ==
McCarthy graduated with a Bachelor of Arts in history from the Virginia Military Institute. He has a Master of Business Administration degree from the Robert H. Smith School of Business at the University of Maryland.

A former United States Army Ranger, he served in the 75th Ranger Regiment's 3rd Battalion during the United States invasion of Afghanistan.

He was later inducted into the U.S. Army Ranger Hall of Fame in 2019.

== Private sector career ==
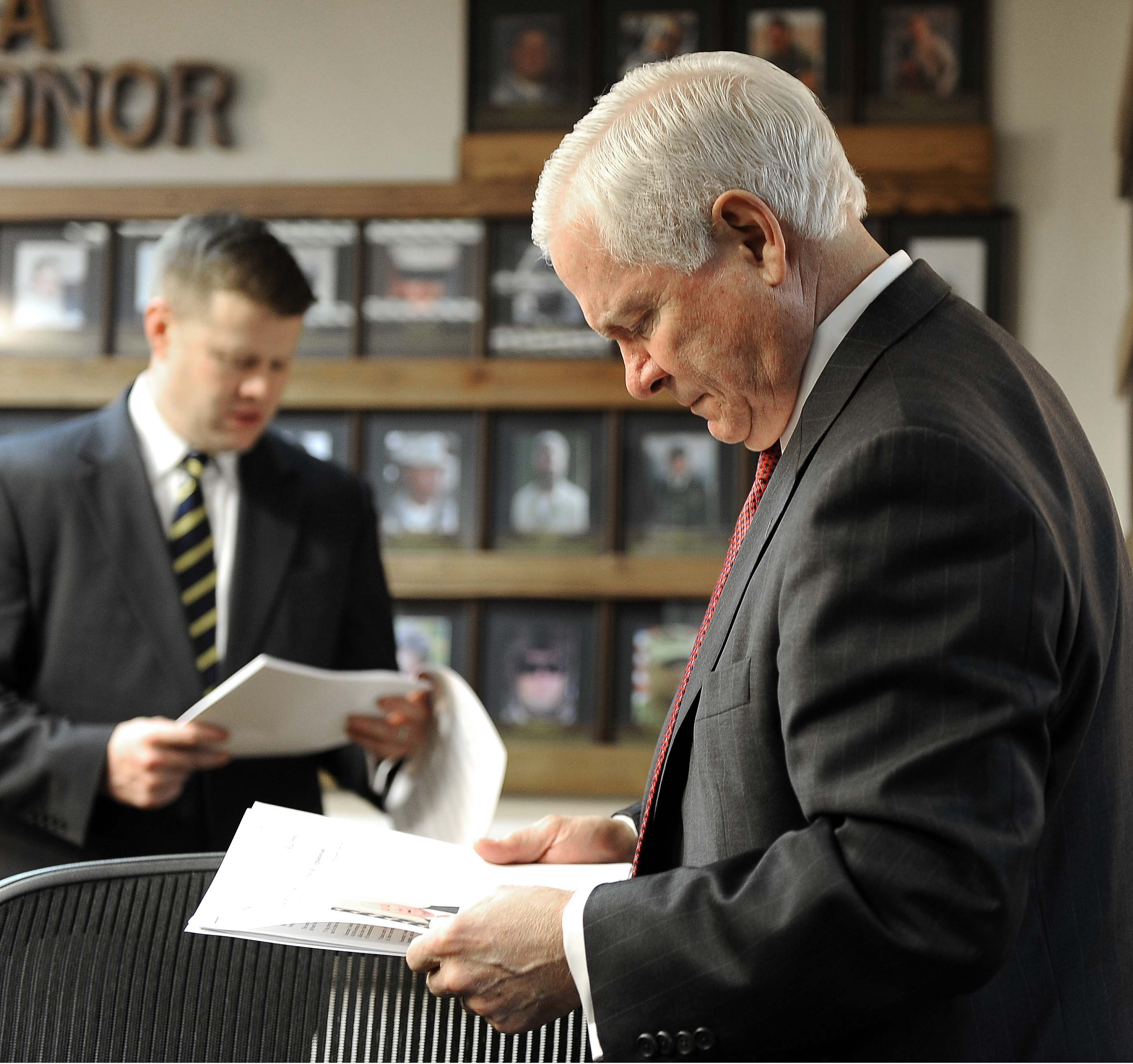
Defense Secretary Robert Gates and McCarthy look over paperwork while visiting Camp Eggers in Kabul on December 8, 2009

Early in his career, McCarthy worked at HSBC. He became a professional staff member on the United States House Committee on Foreign Affairs. McCarthy later served as a special assistant to former United States Secretary of Defense Robert Gates, where he was "the right hand of the Defense secretary with front-office access."

McCarthy joined Lockheed Martin in 2011, where he worked on programs including the Lockheed Martin F-35 Lightning II. He most recently served as the vice president of the sustainment program for the F-35 program.

In February 2022, McCarthy joined the Maxwell School of Syracuse University as a resident scholar, serving as a strategic advisor and subject matter expert.

== Department of the Army ==
In June 2017, President Donald Trump nominated him to become the Under Secretary of the Army. He was confirmed as Under Secretary of the Army by the United States Senate on August 1, 2017, by voice vote.

While Under Secretary, he served as acting Secretary of the Army twice. The first was from August 3 to November 20, 2017, during which he approved the Army directive which initiated an Army Command, Army Futures Command (AFC). The second was from June 24 to July 15, 2019, while Secretary of the Army Mark Esper was acting as Secretary of Defense.

=== U.S. Secretary of the Army ===
President Trump nominated McCarthy to become the Secretary of the Army on June 21, 2019. He was confirmed on September 26, 2019, and was sworn in on September 30, 2019.

As United States Secretary of the Army, McCarthy met with the Minister of State for the Armed Forces, Anne-Marie Trevelyan MP, at The Pentagon on 11 February 2020.

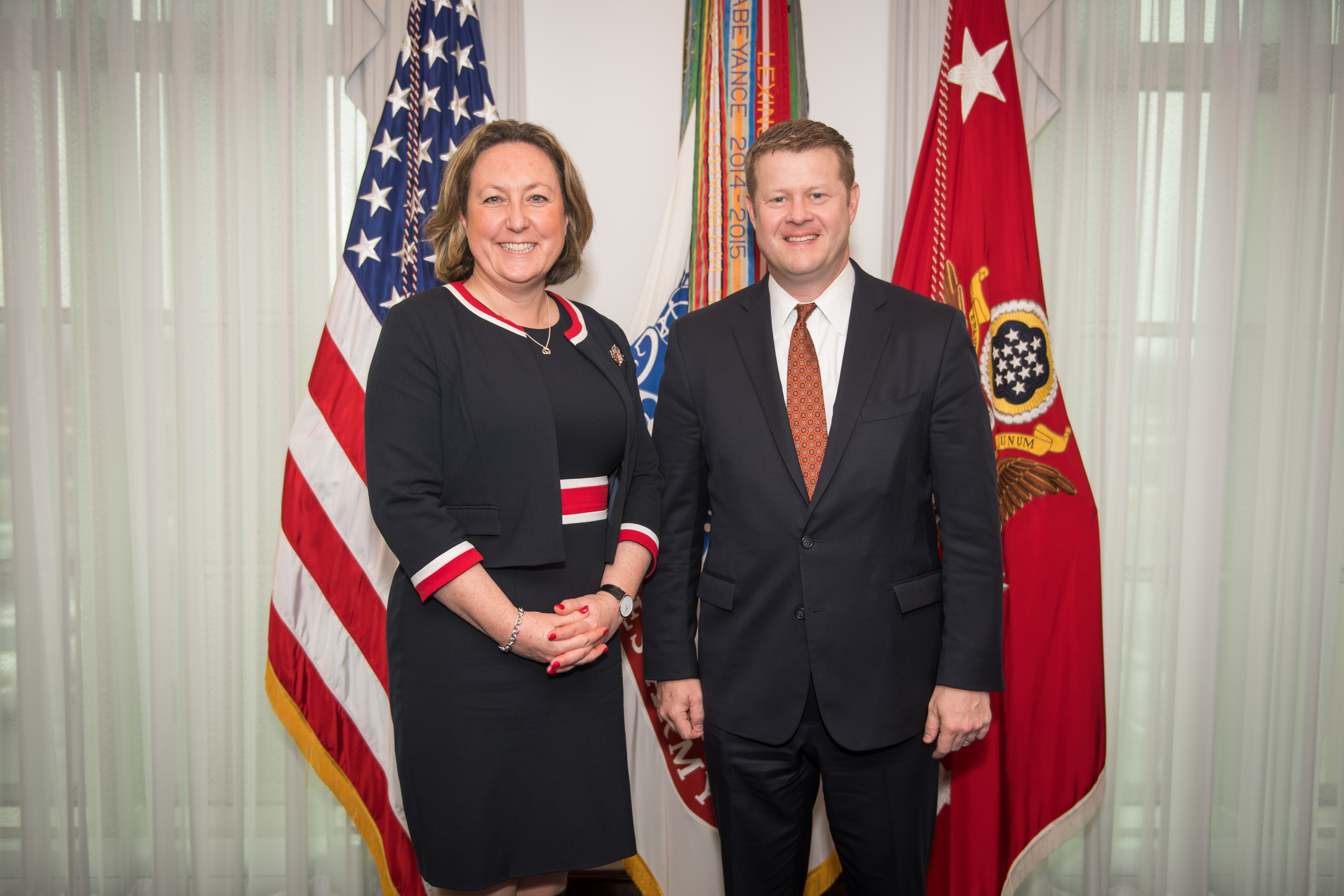
The United Kingdom's Minister of State for the Armed Forces, Anne-Marie Trevelyan MP (2019-2020), meeting McCarthy at The Pentagon in Arlington, Virginia in February 2020 when he was United States Secretary of the Army

==== George Floyd protests ====
In 2020, amid the George Floyd protests, McCarthy activated the D.C. National Guard, which included the use of aviation assets to support local and Federal law enforcement efforts. The D.C. National Guard is the only National Guard unit, of the 54 states and territories that have them, which reports only to the President of the United States. The Commanding General of the D.C. National Guard is subordinate solely to the President. This authority to activate the D.C. National Guard has been delegated by the President to the Secretary of Defense and further delegated to the Secretary of the Army. During the protests, McCarthy gave the order to deploy helicopters in response to the protests. On June 2, Secretary of Defense Mark Esper ordered an inquiry into the incident, which as of 4 June 2020 is under investigation. On April 14, the Army released the findings of the investigation into low flying helicopters. The Army investigation into the National Guard's use of low-flying helicopters during a June 2020 demonstration in Washington, D.C., found a "systematic lack of understanding" of how to use military aviation to respond to civil disturbances and resulted in disciplinary action taken against several individuals involved in the operation.

==== Storming of the U.S. Capitol ====
On January 6, 2021, a mob of supporters of Donald Trump stormed the U.S. Capitol, overrunning and assaulting a small group of Capitol Police officers protecting the Capitol. Questions were raised about McCarthy's handling of the riots, as the D.C. National Guard (overseen by McCarthy) were delayed in responding to the riots once they started. On March 4 Army Gen. Mark A. Milley, chairman of the Joint Chiefs of Staff, said defense officials approved a police request for assistance in about 60 minutes and the D.C. National Guard "reacted faster than the most elite forces from a cold start".

In a testimony to Congress, McCarthy said there had been no plans to have the D.C. National Guard assist Capitol police in case events that day escalated. D.C. National Guard's commanding general, Maj. Gen. William Walker, said that McCarthy had instituted unusual restrictions, requiring employment of the quick-reaction force to be approved by the chain of command, which prevented a rapid deployment of the D.C. National Guard.

On November 16, 2021, the Department of Defense Office of Inspector General released their findings on the actions that took place to prepare for and respond to protests at the U.S. Capitol. The report concluded that the actions the DoD took before January 6, 2021, to prepare for the planned protests in Washington, D.C., on January 5 and 6, 2021, were appropriate, supported by requirements, consistent with the DoD's roles and responsibilities for DSCA, and compliant with laws, regulations, and other applicable guidance.

=== Housing ===
In August 2018, Reuters published a damaging report on the state of privatized U.S. military housing. According to the report - Army data from other clinics showed at least 77 more high blood-lead tests for children at Fort Polk in Louisiana, Fort Riley in Kansas, and Fort Hood and Fort Bliss in Texas.

In February 2019, McCarthy, then Under Secretary for the U.S. Army said he is embarrassed the service had to learn about soldiers and family members living in mold-infested, dilapidated on-post housing from news reports. And went on to state how grateful he was for news agencies like Reuters and families stepping forward to talk about the challenges that they face and the inability for them to get resolution for the challenges that they have had with housing.

In December 2019, now serving as secretary of the Army, McCarthy testified before Congress that the Army had taken several steps to include assigning housing operations to a four-star commander who can withhold incentive fees from privatized housing providers, if necessary, based on the incentive fee metrics.

=== COVID Support Effort ===
In March 2020, McCarthy directed U.S. Army units to prepare to provide direct support to COVID-19 medical efforts. Moving on the orders of Secretary of the Army Ryan McCarthy, the Army issued deployment orders to the 531st Hospital from Fort Campbell, Kentucky, the 627th Hospital from Fort Carson, Colorado, and the 9th Hospital from Fort Hood, Texas, to deploy to New York and Washington State.

By April 2020 the Army had 14 Urban Augmentation Medical Task Forces throughout New York City hospitals and the Javits Center and several sites in New Jersey.

During the course of 2020, COVID-19 affected nearly every aspect of Army operations to include, Industry procurement operations, recruiting, basic training and permanent change of station for Soldiers. Consequently, McCarthy implemented several programs to mitigate impacts to Army operations.

=== The Murder of Vanessa Guillen ===
Vanessa Guillén was a 20-year-old U.S. Army soldier who was bludgeoned to death with a hammer on April 22, 2020, inside a Fort Hood, Texas, armory by another enlisted soldier, Aaron David Robinson, a 20-year-old from Calumet City, Illinois. Guillén had been missing since April 22 when some of her dismembered remains were found buried along the Leon River on June 30.

Upon hearing about the discovery of Guillén's remains, Robinson fled Fort Hood and fatally shot himself when law enforcement attempted to apprehend him in Killeen, Texas, shortly after midnight.[1][2][3] Cecily Aguilar, a local woman identified by authorities as Robinson's girlfriend, was taken into custody and is alleged to have assisted Robinson in dismembering and burying Guillén's body. On July 2, 2020, she was charged with one federal count of conspiracy to tamper with evidence. On July 13, 2021, she was indicted on 11 counts by a federal grand jury.

On July 10, 2020, the McCarthy announced that he would order a "full independent review" of Guillén's case. The full independent review identified several climate issues at Fort Hood as it relates to sexual assault.

On December 8, 2020, McCarthy announced the results of the investigation. McCarthy said that Guillén's murder "shocked our conscience and brought attention to deeper problems" at Fort Hood and across the Army more widely. He said it "forced us to take a critical look at our systems, our policies, and ourselves." The findings resulted in administrative action against a total of 14 leaders to include commanders at Fort Hood, citing multiple "leadership failures". The investigation found that there was a "permissive environment for sexual assault and sexual harassment at Fort Hood." The number of leaders disciplined was the largest number in Army history.

=== Army Modernization and Army Futures Command ===
McCarthy was a staunch advocate of Army modernization efforts by way of the creation of Army Futures Command.

U.S. Army Futures Command was activated in the summer of 2018. The command was designed as a public-private initiative, which runs modernization projects for the Army. It is headquartered in Austin, Texas.

The command is focused on six priorities: 1) Long-range precision fires, 2) Next Generation Combat Vehicle, 3) Future Vertical Lift platforms, 4) a mobile & expeditionary Army network, 5) air and missile defense capabilities,[6] and 6) soldier lethality.

Political offices
Preceded by Patrick Murphy	United States Under Secretary of the Army; 2017–2019	Succeeded by James E. McPherson
Preceded by Robert M. Speer; Acting	United States Secretary of the Army; Acting; 2017	Succeeded by Mark Esper
Preceded by Mark Esper	United States Secretary of the Army; Acting; 2019	Succeeded by Mark Esper
Preceded by Mark Esper	United States Secretary of the Army; 2019–2021	Succeeded by John E. Whitley; Acting
