= Alex A. Beehler =

American educator & lawyer

Alex Beehler
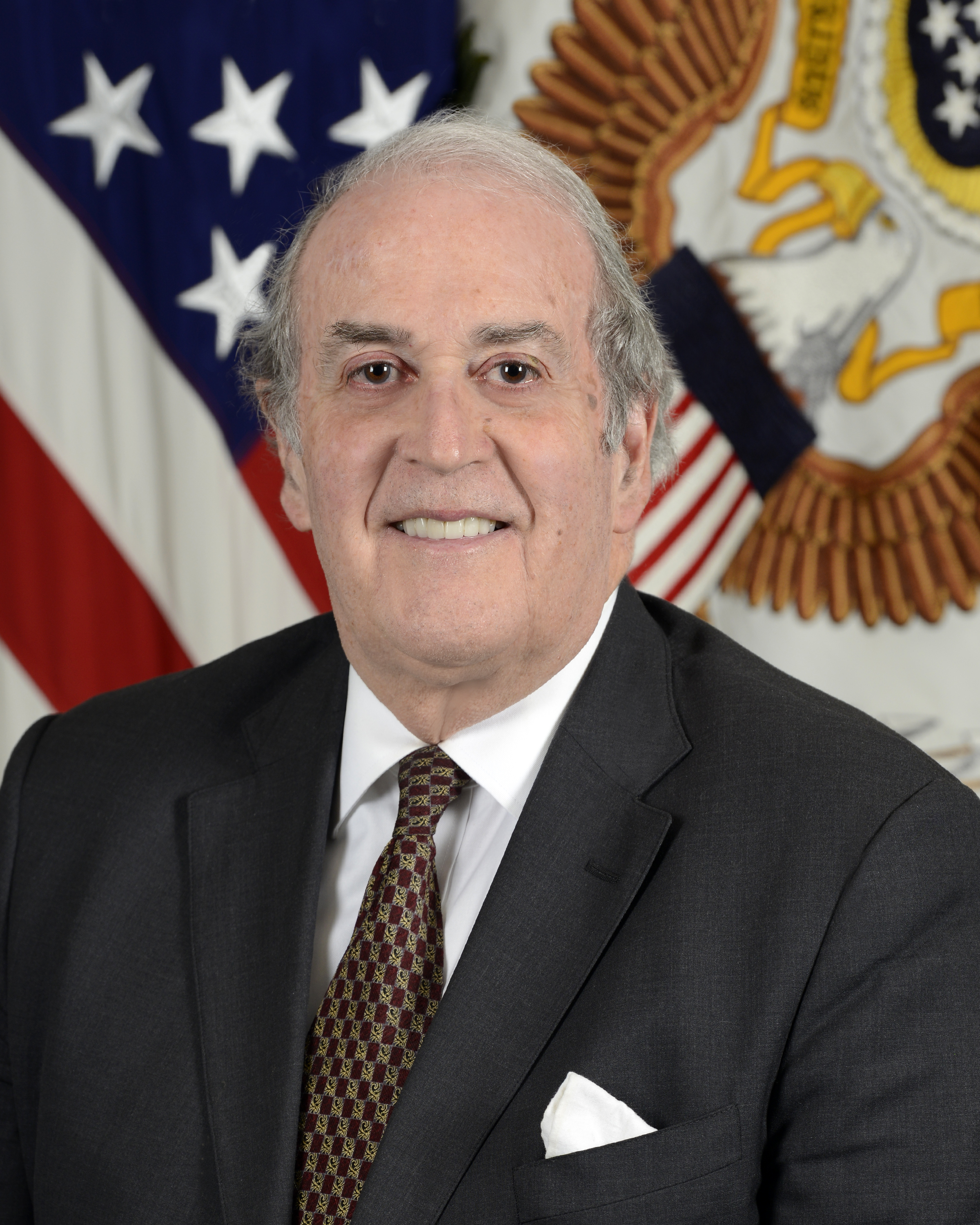
- Alex Beehler in 2019

8th Assistant Secretary of the Army for Installations, Energy and Environment
- In office January 10, 2019 – January 20, 2021
- President: Donald Trump
- Preceded by: Katherine Hammack
- Succeeded by: Rachel Jacobson

Personal details
- Education: Princeton University (BA); University of Virginia (JD)

Alex Albert Beehler is a professor, lawyer, and former senior American government official, who served as the Assistant Secretary of the Army for Installations, Energy and Environment between 2019 and 2021.

== Career ==
In 1975, Alex Beehler gained a Bachelor of Arts from Princeton University, before gaining a Juris Doctor from the University of Virginia School of Law in 1978. Subsequently, he spent 25 years practicing law, both in a private environment, and across a number of federal agencies including the Department of Justice's Environmental Enforcement Section. Prior to joining the Department of Defense, Beehler served concurrently as the Director of Environmental and Regulatory Affairs at Koch Industries, and as the Vice President for Environmental Projects at the Charles G. Koch Foundation. Between 2004 and 2009, Beehler served in the Department Defense, firstly as the Assistant Deputy Under Secretary of Defense for Environment, Safety and Occupational Health, and then later as the Acting Deputy Under Secretary of Defense for Installations & Environment. He also was the inaugural Chief Sustainability Officer of the department. After leaving the DoD Beehler worked for FaegreBD Consulting, providing environment, energy, and sustainability advice to government agencies; however in 2018, he was nominated to serve as the 8th Assistant Secretary of the Army for Installations, Energy and Environment within the Department of the Army, and was sworn in on January 20, 2019. He served in this role until the beginning of Joe Biden's presidency.

Beehler remains a member of the District of Columbia Bar, Maryland State Bar Association, and Virginia State Bar.

== Personal life ==
Beehler is married to Stephanie, and has two adult children.
