= Katherine Hammack =

American government official (born 1959)

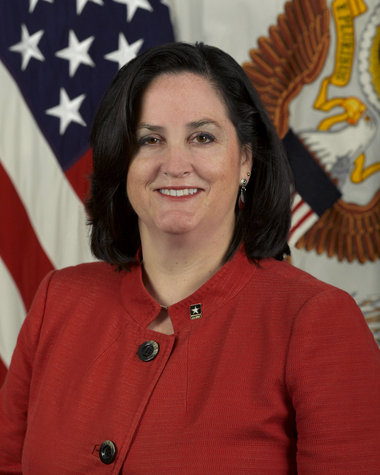

Assistant Secretary of the Army for Installations, Energy and Environment
- In office June 28, 2010 – January 20, 2017
- President: Barack Obama
- Secretary: John M. McHugh; Eric Fanning
- Preceded by: Keith E. Eastin
- Succeeded by: Alex A. Beehler

Personal details
- Education: Oregon State University (BS); University of Hartford (MBA)

Katherine Grace Hammack (born November 23, 1959) is the former United States Assistant Secretary of the Army (Installations, Energy and Environment), having assumed office on June 28, 2010, and completing her appointment on January 20, 2017. She then returned to her previous employer, Ernst & Young LLP, as executive director in the Government and Public Sector Advisory practice.

== Biography ==
Born Katherine Grace Dellett in Washington, D.C., she was educated at Oregon State University, earning a bachelor's degree in mechanical engineering with a specialization in HVAC in 1981. She later received an M.B.A. from the University of Hartford in 1990.

Hammack's career focused on energy and sustainability advisory services. Specifically, she has worked on the evaluation of energy conservation projects, including ventilation upgrades, room air distribution, indoor air quality, lighting efficiency, cogeneration, sustainable design, solar energy, and building operations.

From November 1995 to March 2001, Hammack was a senior account executive for Arizona Public Service. From March 2001 to June 2010, she worked as a senior manager in the Ernst & Young Climate Change and Sustainability Services practice. There, her work focused on helping her clients achieve LEED certification.

In January 2010, President of the United States Barack Obama nominated Hammack to be Assistant Secretary of the Army (Installations, Energy and Environment) and, after Senate confirmation, she was sworn into office on June 28, 2010.

On August 7, 2017, it was announced that she would return to her previous employer, Ernst & Young LLP, as executive director in the Government and Public Sector Advisory practice.
