= Robert H. McMahon =

United States Air Force general

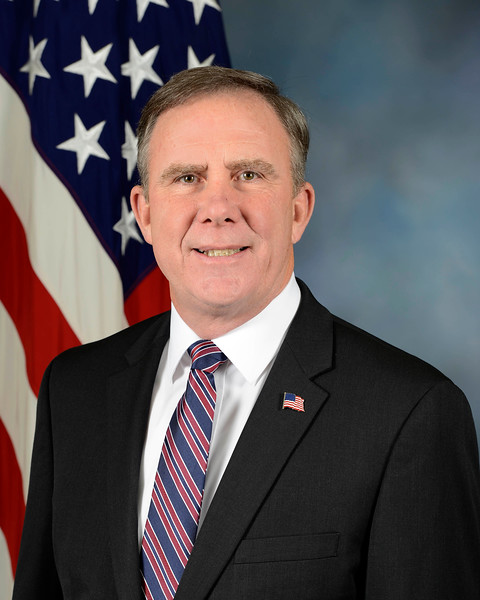

Assistant Secretary of Defense for Sustainment
- In office October 12, 2018 – November 22, 2019
- Preceded by: Position established
- Succeeded by: Jordan Gillis

Assistant Secretary of Defense for Logistics and Materiel Readiness
- In office November 30, 2017 – October 11, 2018
- President: Donald Trump
- Preceded by: David J. Berteau
- Succeeded by: Position abolished

Personal details
- Born: Robert Howard McMahon Toledo, Ohio
- Spouse: Hope
- Education: United States Air Force Academy; Air Force Institute of Technology
- Awards: Air Force Distinguished Service Medal (3); Defense Superior Service Medal; Legion of Merit (3)
- Military career
- Allegiance: United States
- Branch: United States Air Force
- Service years: 1978–2012
- Rank: Major general
- Commands: Warner Robins Air Logistics Center; 309th Maintenance Wing; 35th Logistics Group

Robert Howard McMahon is a retired United States Air Force major general who later served as Assistant Secretary of Defense for Sustainment. He was the first holder of that office, which the Pentagon created in October 2018 by combining its logistics and installations portfolios, and he had been Assistant Secretary of Defense for Logistics and Materiel Readiness since November 2017. During 2019 he was the department's lead official on the operating costs of the F-35, on the reform of privatized military housing and on PFAS contamination at military bases. He resigned in November 2019.

McMahon served in the Air Force from 1978 to 2012 as an aircraft maintenance and logistics officer. He commanded the 309th Maintenance Wing at Hill Air Force Base, Utah, was Director of Logistics on the Air Staff and ended his career in command of the Warner Robins Air Logistics Center at Robins Air Force Base, Georgia. He then led the 21st Century Partnership, a community group that supports Robins, ran Boeing's C-17 field operations at the base and was president of a Macon property management firm before his nomination in 2017.

== Early life and education ==
McMahon was born in Toledo, Ohio. He graduated from the United States Air Force Academy in 1978 with a bachelor's degree in international affairs and was commissioned as a second lieutenant on May 31 of that year. He earned a master's degree in maintenance management at the Air Force Institute of Technology in 1986 and completed Squadron Officer School, Air Command and Staff College and Air War College at Maxwell Air Force Base, Alabama. He also attended the advanced program management course of the Defense Systems Management College in 1999 and a national security management course at Syracuse University's Maxwell School of Citizenship and Public Affairs in 2001.

== Air Force career ==
McMahon began as an aircraft maintenance officer. After the maintenance officer course at Chanute Air Force Base, Illinois, he served in avionics and aircraft maintenance units of fighter wings at Davis–Monthan, Eglin and Elmendorf air force bases. After graduate school he worked on logistics information systems and in the commander's action group at Tactical Air Command headquarters at Langley Air Force Base, Virginia. In the early 1990s he commanded the 325th Component Repair Squadron and then the 325th Maintenance Squadron at Tyndall Air Force Base, Florida, and from 1995 to 1997 he commanded the 35th Logistics Group at Misawa Air Base, Japan.

He then spent most of a decade in the Air Force depot system and on the Air Staff. He was director of the propulsion directorate at the San Antonio Air Logistics Center at Kelly Air Force Base, Texas, from 1997 to 2000, director of the aircraft directorate at the Ogden Air Logistics Center at Hill Air Force Base, Utah, from 2000 to 2001, and senior military assistant to the Assistant Secretary of the Air Force for Installations, Environment and Logistics from 2001 to 2003. He returned to Ogden as director of maintenance in 2003 and commanded the center's 309th Maintenance Wing in 2005. He was promoted to brigadier general in February 2004 and to major general in August 2007.

From 2005 to 2007 McMahon was Director of Logistics at Air Mobility Command at Scott Air Force Base, Illinois. In December 2007 he became Director of Maintenance on the Air Staff in Washington, under the Deputy Chief of Staff for Logistics, Installations and Mission Support, and in October 2008 Director of Logistics in the same office. In November 2010 he took command of the Warner Robins Air Logistics Center at Robins Air Force Base, Georgia. The center managed worldwide logistics support for the C-130, C-5, F-15 and U-2 fleets, among other systems, and was the largest industrial complex on a single site in Georgia. The Air Force announced his retirement in February 2012, after more than 34 years of service, with a retirement ceremony planned for June. His decorations include the Air Force Distinguished Service Medal with two oak leaf clusters, the Defense Superior Service Medal and the Legion of Merit with two oak leaf clusters.

== Business and civic roles in Georgia ==
Prior to assuming his most recent role, McMahon served as president of Fickling Management Services and as a board member of State Bank and Trust, the Mercer National Engineering Advisory Board, and the Robins Air Force Base Museum of Aviation Foundation. He previously served as the director of C-17 Field Operations for the Boeing Company and as president and CEO of the 21st Century Partnership. After retiring in 2012 he stayed in Middle Georgia, where his wife, Hope, was a civilian employee of Air Force Reserve Command. He led the 21st Century Partnership, a community group in Warner Robins, Georgia, that works to support the base, from 2012 to May 2014, directed Boeing's C-17 field operations at Robins from May 2014 to August 2015 and became president of Fickling, a property management and leasing firm in Macon, Georgia, in November 2015.

As head of the partnership he was a public voice for the base during the 2013 budget sequestration. In February 2013 he warned that the Air Force's plan to stop maintenance work on many aircraft types could lead to more furlough days, or to layoffs, for the maintenance workforce at Robins than the 22 days then projected, and when the furloughs began in July he estimated that they would take $50 million out of the local economy. He joined the boards of State Bank Financial Corporation and its subsidiary State Bank and Trust in 2012 and was a director of the aerospace manufacturer NORDAM from 2012 to 2014.

== Department of Defense ==
On September 26, 2017, President Donald Trump announced that he would nominate McMahon as Assistant Secretary of Defense for Logistics and Materiel Readiness. The Senate Armed Services Committee reported his nomination favorably by voice vote on November 14, 2017, and the full Senate confirmed him on November 16, 2017, together with seven other Defense Department nominees, en bloc and without a recorded vote.

The post was already scheduled to disappear. In the 2018 reorganization that split the Office of the Under Secretary of Defense for Acquisition, Technology and Logistics, the department merged the logistics office with that of the Assistant Secretary of Defense for Energy, Installations, and Environment to form a single Assistant Secretary of Defense for Sustainment under the new Under Secretary of Defense for Acquisition and Sustainment. Trump nominated McMahon to the new post on August 15, 2018, the committee reported the nomination on September 25, and the Senate confirmed him by voice vote on October 11, 2018. The office made him responsible for about $170 billion a year in logistics operations and for the department's real estate, which included more than 500 installations and some 28 million acres.

As the Pentagon's senior sustainment official, McMahon was responsible for bringing down the F-35's operating costs. In June 2019 he said he still aimed at a cost of $25,000 per flying hour, a target that the program's executive officer and the department's cost analysts had told Congress a month earlier would not be reached, with the figure expected to settle between $34,000 and $36,000. He said he reviewed progress on parts and maintenance with Lockheed Martin and Pratt & Whitney at 45-day intervals, and that new depots were opening about six years earlier than planned.

He also led the department's response to complaints from military families about mold, lead paint and vermin in privatized housing on bases, which had been aired in congressional hearings. In June 2019 he said a draft tenant bill of rights, including rights to a healthy home, a housing advocate, prompt repairs and a dispute-resolution process, would be sent to families living on installations for their comments. In August he opened the third meeting since February between defense officials and the executives of the private housing companies, and said a resident bill of rights, a statement of resident responsibilities and a common lease framework would be ready by October.

In July 2019 Defense Secretary Mark Esper set up a task force on contamination from PFAS, the chemicals used in firefighting foam, at military installations, and McMahon was given responsibility for it. In September he told reporters that the department had examined the 524 drinking water systems it operated, that 24 of them had exceeded the Environmental Protection Agency's health advisory level of 70 parts per trillion, and that it had identified 401 current and former installations with some contamination from its own activities. He said that nobody was drinking water above the advisory level where the department was the supplier, and that it would begin blood testing of its firefighters.

McMahon sent his resignation to the White House on September 17, 2019, to take effect on November 22, and told his staff that it "was the right time". He had held the sustainment post for less than a year.

== Later career ==
After leaving the Pentagon McMahon became an operating advisor at Liberty Hall Capital Partners, which invests private equity in aerospace and defense companies, and in March 2021 Systecon North America, a modeling and analytics company, appointed him a senior advisor. He has also consulted for the Institute for Defense Analyses, is a director of the shipping company American Roll-on Roll-off Carrier and serves on the board of the Georgia Veterans Service Foundation.
