= Donald F. Carpenter =

American businessman and federal official

- Born: Donald Fell Carpenter; September 24, 1899; Wilkes Barre, Pennsylvania
- Died: September 28, 1985 (aged 86)
- Occupations: American businessman, federal official

Donald F. Carpenter (1899–1985) was an American businessman who served as the first civilian Chairman of the Military Liaison Committee of the Atomic Energy Commission, Deputy to United States Secretary of Defense James V. Forrestal on atomic energy matters, and Chairman of the U.S. Munitions Board.

In 1922, Carpenter graduated from the Massachusetts Institute of Technology with a Bachelor of Science in engineering degree and entered industry, rising through key managerial positions with the Dupont Viscoloid Company from 1927 through 1933, and the Remington Arms Company from 1933 through 1947. As vice president and assistant general manager of the Remington Arms Company during World War II, he guided the company's expansion to meet the Allied Forces' ammunition needs.

In 1947, he was appointed a member of the Industrial Advisory Group to the Atomic Energy Commission, where he advocated wider industrial participation in the developing atomic energy enterprise. In 1948 he was appointed by U.S. President Harry S. Truman as the first civilian chairman of the Military Liaison Committee of the Atomic Energy Commission, where he strengthened the committee status as a civilian-military enterprise inclusive of Army, Navy and Air Force nuclear activities. Later in 1948 Carpenter was appointed by Secretary of Defense James V. Forrestal as his deputy "in atomic energy matters".

In 1948, Carpenter was appointed by President Truman to chair the national Munitions Board, succeeding Thomas J. Hargrave, the seat was established by the National Security Act of 1947 to coordinate industrial matters affecting the National Military Establishment, including procurement, production, and distribution functions. His work as chairman was recognized with letters of appreciation from James Forrestal, Harry S. Truman and Dwight D. Eisenhower.

Carpenter returned to DuPont as general manager of the Film Department in 1949, and worked there until his retirement in 1963.

The Donald F. Carpenter Collection at the Hagley Museum and Library documents his life and career through photographs, newspaper clippings, magazine articles, pamphlets and letters.

== Personal ==
Carpenter was born in Wilkes-Barre, Pennsylvania on September 24, 1899. He was a first cousin of Walter S. Carpenter Jr., and Robert Ruliph Morgan Carpenter., Manuscripts and Archives Department.
