= Christine Wormuth =

American government official (born 1969)

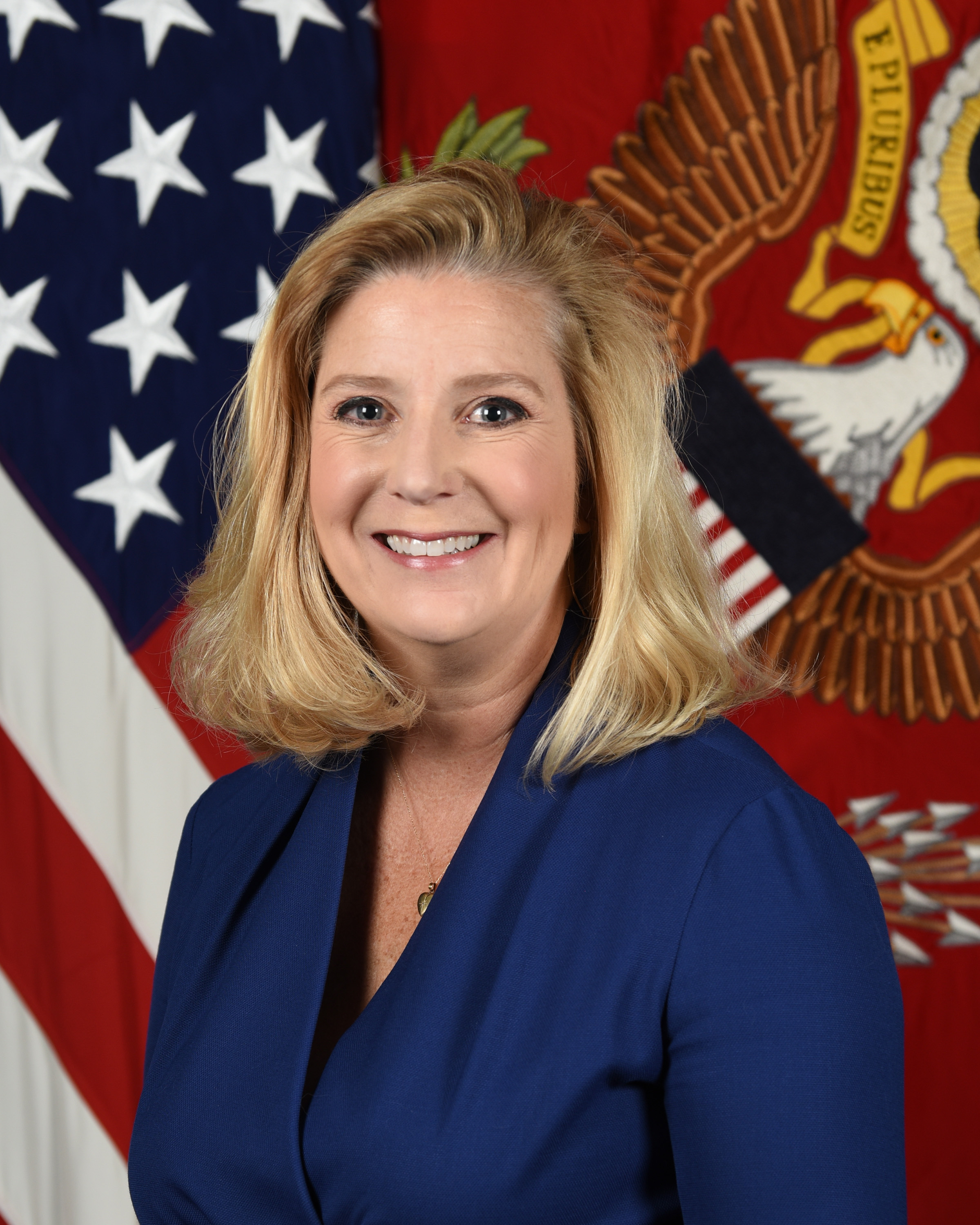
- Official portrait, 2021

25th United States Secretary of the Army
- In office May 28, 2021 – January 20, 2025
- President: Joe Biden
- Deputy: Christopher Lowman (acting); Gabe Camarillo
- Preceded by: Ryan D. McCarthy
- Succeeded by: Daniel P. Driscoll

11th Under Secretary of Defense for Policy
- In office June 23, 2014 – June 10, 2016
- President: Barack Obama
- Preceded by: James N. Miller
- Succeeded by: John Rood

Personal details
- Born: April 19, 1968 (age 58) San Diego, California, U.S.
- Party: Democratic
- Children: 2
- Education: Williams College (BA); University of Maryland, College Park (MPP)
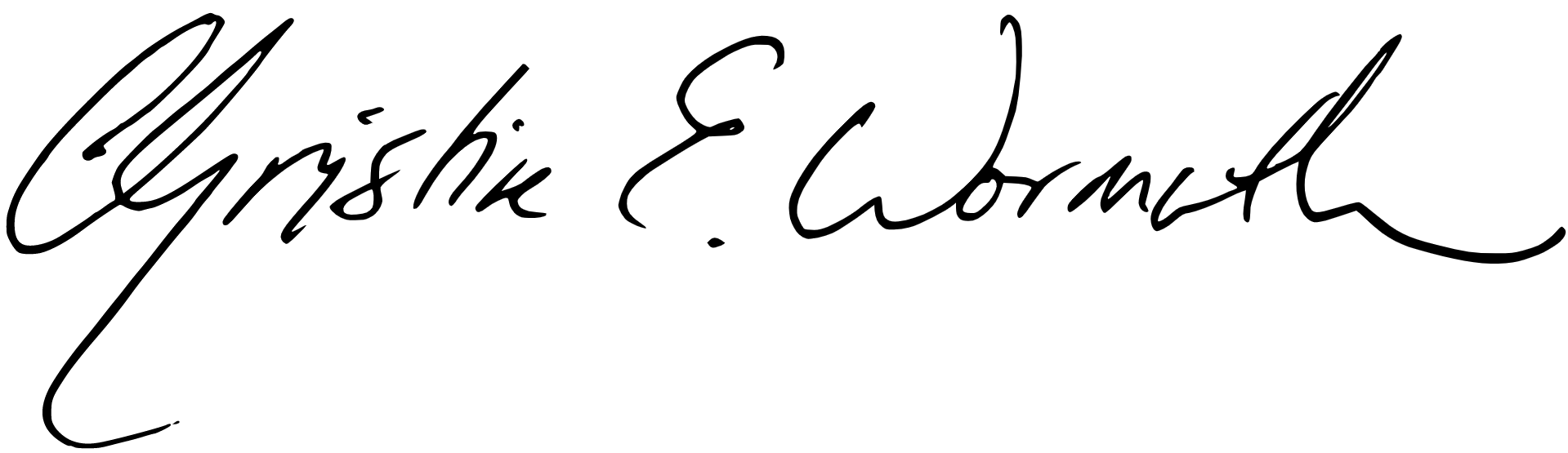
- Signature
- Wormuth's voice Wormuth's opening statement at a Senate Armed Services Committee hearing on the FY2023 Army budget Recorded May 5, 2022

Christine Elizabeth Wormuth (born April 19, 1969) is an American defense official and career civil servant who served as the United States secretary of the Army from 2021 to 2025. A member of the Democratic Party, she is the first female United States secretary of the Army.

== Early life and education ==
Christine Elizabeth Wormuth was born on April 19, 1969, in the community of La Jolla, north of San Diego. After growing up in College Station, Texas, she graduated from Williams College in Massachusetts with a bachelor's degree in political science before earning her master's in public policy from the University of Maryland.

== Career ==
Wormuth entered government service as a presidential management intern in 1995. She spent the next 6 1/2 years as a civil servant in the Defense Department. Later, she worked as a government consultant and then a senior fellow at the Center for Strategic and International Studies.

Before she was nominated for Under Secretary of Defense for Policy, Wormuth served in the National Security Council as the special assistant to the president and the senior director for defense policy and strategy. From 2009 to 2010, Wormuth was the principal deputy assistant secretary for homeland defense.

=== Obama administration ===
Wormuth was nominated by President Barack Obama to serve as the under secretary of defense for policy. On June 19, 2014, she was confirmed by the United States Senate by voice vote. As the under secretary, Wormuth contributed to counter-terrorism operations and engaged in defense relations with Europe, Asia, and the Middle East.

Upon the conclusion of her tenure as the under secretary, Wormuth was appointed as the director of the RAND International Security and Defense Policy Center.

=== Biden administration ===
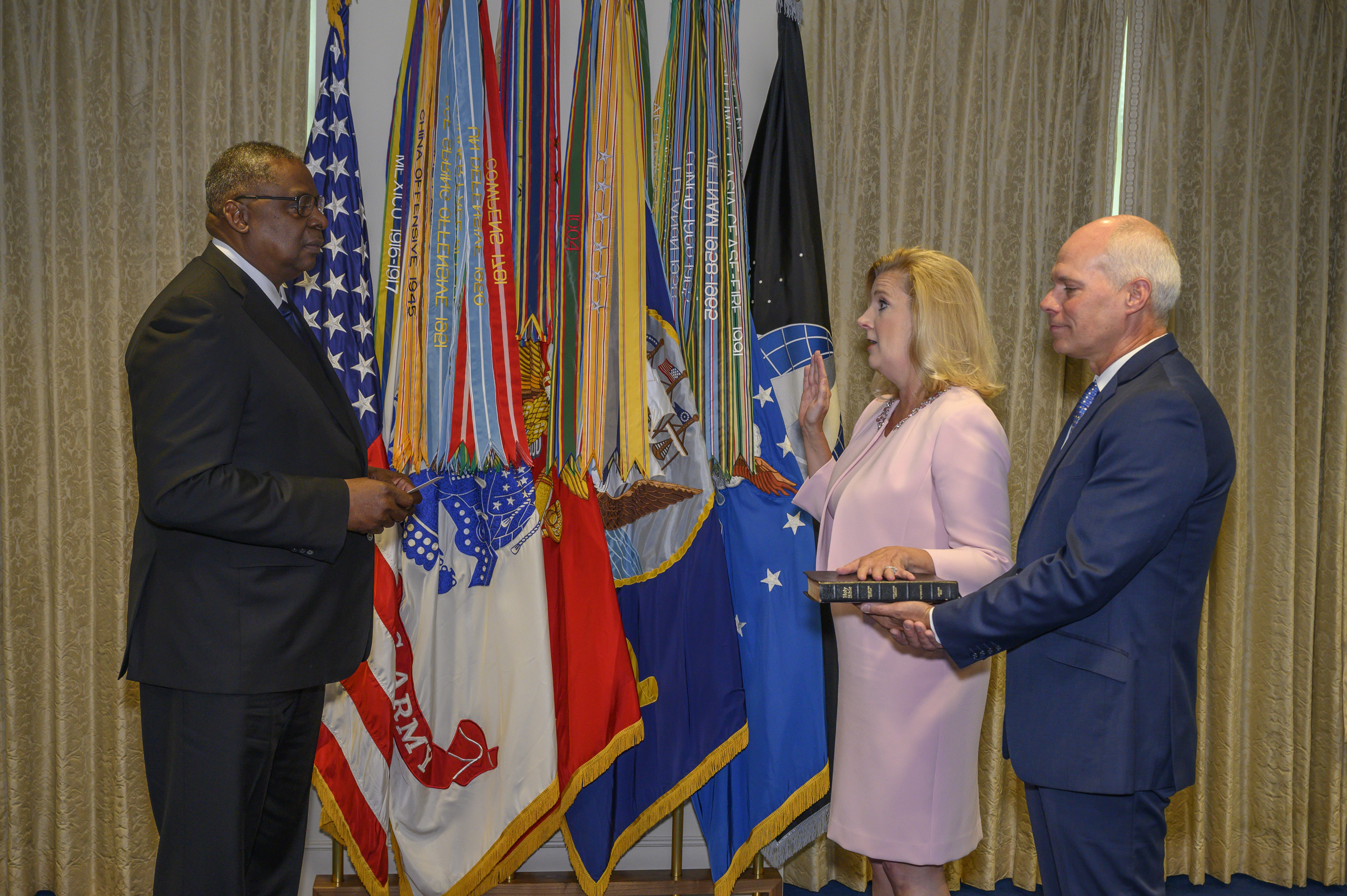
Christine Wormuth is sworn in as the 25th secretary of the Army by Secretary of Defense Lloyd Austin at the Pentagon, Washington, D.C., May 27, 2021.

In November 2020, Wormuth was named a volunteer member of the Joe Biden presidential transition Agency Review Team to support transition efforts related to the United States Department of Defense.

==== Secretary of the Army ====
On April 12, 2021, President Joe Biden nominated Wormuth to serve as the 25th secretary of the Army. She is the first woman to serve in the position for the Army, however, not the first female secretary in the United States Armed Forces, as there have been five female secretaries of the Air Force. On April 15, 2021, her nomination was sent to the Senate. On May 24, her nomination was reported out of the Senate Armed Services Committee by voice vote. Two days later, her nomination was confirmed by the Senate by unanimous consent, but Senate majority leader Chuck Schumer requested it be rescinded and her confirmation was subsequently reversed hours later. This was because Republican senator Kevin Cramer had placed a hold on her nomination to resolve an issue involving an underpaid Army major and the Senate had mistakenly approved her nomination before he had removed his hold. The following day, Cramer removed his hold after being told the pay issue would be resolved and confirmed that he supported Wormuth, who he said would "do a fine job". Wormuth was then officially confirmed on May 27, again by unanimous consent. She was sworn in the following day.

== Personal life ==
Secretary Wormuth is married to Andrew "Drew" Kuepper, a former naval flight officer flying the P-3 Orion who retired as a commander in the Navy Reserve. He currently serves as the deputy assistant secretary for CWMD strategy, plans and policy in the U.S. Department of Homeland Security. They have two daughters.

Political offices
Preceded by Ryan D. McCarthy	United States Secretary of the Army; 2021–2025	Succeeded by Mark Averill; Acting
