= Chief of Staff of the United States Army =

Senior-most officer and service chief of the United States Army

Chief of Staff of the Army
- Army Staff Identification Badge

- Flag of the chief of staff

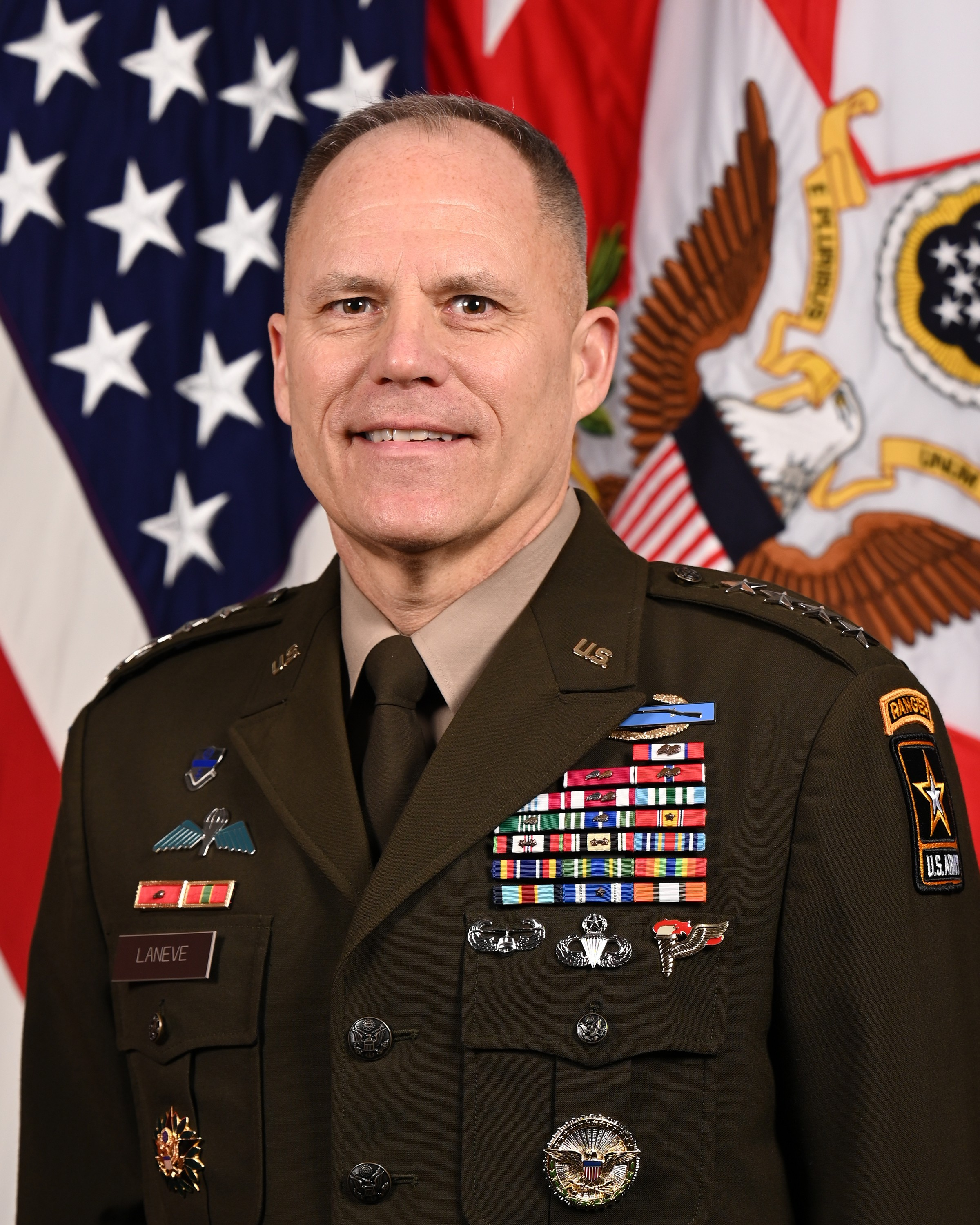
- Incumbent; General Christopher LaNeve; Acting since 2 April 2026
- Department of the Army; Army Staff
- Type: United States Army service chief
- Abbreviation: CSA
- Member of: Joint Chiefs of Staff
- Reports to: Secretary of the Army
- Residence: Quarters 1, Fort Myer
- Seat: The Pentagon, Arlington County, Virginia
- Appointer: The president; with Senate advice and consent
- Term length: 4 years; Renewable one time, only during war or national emergency
- Constituting instrument: 10 U.S.C. § 7033
- Precursor: Commanding General of the Army
- Formation: 15 August 1903
- First holder: LTG Samuel B. M. Young
- Deputy: Vice Chief of Staff of the Army
- Website: www.army.mil

The chief of staff of the Army (CSA) is a statutory position in the United States Army held by a general officer. As the highest-ranking officer assigned to serve in the Department of the Army, the chief is the principal military advisor and a deputy to the secretary of the Army. In a separate capacity, the CSA is a member of the Joint Chiefs of Staff (10 U.S.C. § 151) and, thereby, a military advisor to the National Security Council, the secretary of defense, and the president of the United States. The CSA is typically the highest-ranking officer on active duty in the U.S. Army unless the chairman or the vice chairman of the Joint Chiefs of Staff are Army officers.

The chief of staff of the Army is an administrative position based in the Pentagon. While the CSA does not have operational command authority over Army forces proper (which is within the purview of the combatant commanders who report to the secretary of defense), the CSA does exercise supervision of army units and organizations as the designee of the secretary of the Army.

The former chief of staff of the Army is General Randy George, who was sworn in on 21 September 2023, having previously served as acting CSA from 4 August. After he was removed on 2 April 2026, General Christopher LaNeve became the acting chief of staff.

== Appointment ==
The chief of staff of the Army is nominated for appointment by the president, for a four-year term of office, and must be confirmed by the Senate. The chief can be reappointed to serve one additional term, but only during times of war or national emergency declared by Congress. By statute, the chief is a four-star general.

The chief has an official residence, Quarters 1 at Joint Base Myer–Henderson Hall, Virginia.

== Responsibilities ==
The senior leadership of the Department of the Army consists of two civilians—the secretary of the Army (head of the department and subordinate to the secretary of defense) and the under secretary of the Army—and two military officers—the chief of staff of the Army and the vice chief of staff of the Army.

The chief reports directly to the secretary of the Army for army matters and assists in the secretary's external affairs functions, including presenting and enforcing army policies, plans, and projections. The chief also directs the inspector general of the Army to perform inspections and investigations as required. In addition, the chief presides over the Army Staff and represents Army capabilities, requirements, policy, plans, and programs in Joint forums. Under delegation of authority made by the secretary of the Army, the chief designates army personnel and army resources to the commanders of the unified combatant commands. The chief performs all other functions enumerated in 10 U.S.C. § 3033 under the authority, direction, and control of the secretary of the Army, or delegates those duties and responsibilities to other officers in his administration in his name. Like the other service counterparts, the chief has no operational command authority over army forces, dating back to the passage of the Department of Defense Reorganization Act of 1958. The chief is served by a number of deputy chiefs of staff of the Army, such as G-1, Personnel. The chief's base pay is $21,147.30 per month and also received a personal money allowance (monthly amount) of $333.33, a basic allowance for subsistence of $253.38, and a basic allowance for housing from $50.70 to $1,923.30.

== History ==
In the 19th century the American land military used the title of "General-in-Chief" beginning with Gen. James Wilkinson (1757–1825), and later for several decades of commanding Gen. Winfield Scott (1786–1866). Later Lt. Gen. Ulysses S. Grant (1822–1885), given the title after being recalled to come east from the Western Theater of the Civil War in 1864. By 1903, the senior military officer in the army was the Commanding General of the United States Army, who reported to the U.S. secretary of war. From 1864 to 1865, Major General Henry Halleck (1815–1872), who had previously been Commanding General earlier in the war, served as "Chief of Staff of the Army" under the newly appointed Commanding General, Lieutenant General Ulysses S. Grant, thus serving in a different office and not as the senior officer in the army. Halleck was centered in the old brick War Department building adjacent west of the White House, along with the War Secretary, whereas Gen. Grant was out in the field.

The first chief of staff moved his headquarters to Fort Myer in northern Virginia, near the national capital of Washington, D.C. in 1908.

== List of chiefs of staff of the Army ==
The rank listed is the rank when serving in the office.

No.	Portrait	Name	Term			Branch	Secretaries served under:		Ref.
No.	Portrait	Name	Took office	Left office	Duration	Branch	War / Army	Defense	Ref.
1	Samuel B. M. Young	Lieutenant General; Samuel B. M. Young (1840–1924)	15 August 1903	8 January 1904	146 days	Cavalry	Elihu Root	—	
2	Adna R. Chaffee	Lieutenant General; Adna R. Chaffee (1842–1914)	9 January 1904	14 January 1906	2 years, 5 days	Cavalry	Elihu Root; William Howard Taft	—	
3	John C. Bates	Lieutenant General; John C. Bates (1842–1919)	15 January 1906	13 April 1906	89 days	Infantry	William Howard Taft	—	
4	J. Franklin Bell	Major General; J. Franklin Bell (1856–1919)	14 April 1906	21 April 1910	4 years, 7 days	Cavalry	William Howard Taft; Luke Edward Wright; Jacob M. Dickinson	—	
5	Leonard Wood	Major General; Leonard Wood (1860–1927)	22 April 1910	21 April 1914	3 years, 364 days	Medical and cavalry	Jacob M. Dickinson; Henry L. Stimson; Lindley Miller Garrison	—	
6	William W. Wotherspoon	Major General; William W. Wotherspoon (1850–1921)	22 April 1914	16 November 1914	208 days	Infantry	Lindley Miller Garrison	—	
7	Hugh L. Scott	Major General; Hugh L. Scott (1853–1934)	17 November 1914	22 September 1917	2 years, 309 days	Cavalry	Lindley Miller Garrison; Newton D. Baker	—	
8	Tasker H. Bliss	General; Tasker H. Bliss (1853–1930)	23 September 1917	19 May 1918	238 days	Field artillery	Newton D. Baker	—	
9	Peyton C. March	General; Peyton C. March (1864–1955)	20 May 1918	30 June 1921	3 years, 41 days	Field artillery	Newton D. Baker; John W. Weeks	—	
10	John J. Pershing	General of the Armies; John J. Pershing (1860–1948)	1 July 1921	13 September 1924	3 years, 74 days	Cavalry	John W. Weeks	—	
11	John L. Hines	Major General; John L. Hines (1868–1968)	14 September 1924	20 November 1926	2 years, 68 days	Infantry	John W. Weeks; Dwight F. Davis	—	
12	Charles P. Summerall	General; Charles P. Summerall (1867–1955)	21 November 1926	20 November 1930	3 years, 364 days	Infantry and artillery	Dwight F. Davis; James William Good; Patrick J. Hurley	—	
13	Douglas MacArthur	General; Douglas MacArthur (1880–1964)	21 November 1930	1 October 1935	4 years, 315 days	Infantry and engineers	Patrick J. Hurley; George Dern	—	
14	Malin Craig	General; Malin Craig (1875–1945)	2 October 1935	31 August 1939	3 years, 333 days	Infantry and cavalry	George Dern; Harry Hines Woodring	—	
15	George C. Marshall	General of the Army; George C. Marshall (1880–1959)	1 September 1939	18 November 1945	6 years, 78 days	Infantry	Harry Hines Woodring; Henry L. Stimson; Robert P. Patterson	—	
16	Dwight D. Eisenhower	General of the Army; Dwight D. Eisenhower (1890–1969)	19 November 1945	6 February 1948	2 years, 79 days	Infantry	Robert P. Patterson (of War); Kenneth Claiborne Royall (of War, 1947; of the Army, 1947–1949)	James Forrestal (from Sep. 1947)	
17	Omar N. Bradley	General; Omar N. Bradley (1893–1981)	7 February 1948	15 August 1949 (Note: Appointed as Chairman of the Joint Chiefs of Staff.)	1 year, 189 days	Infantry	Kenneth Claiborne Royall; Gordon Gray	James Forrestal; Louis A. Johnson	
18	J. Lawton Collins	General; J. Lawton Collins (1896–1987)	16 August 1949 (Note: Served prior as Vice Chief of Staff of the Army.)	14 August 1953	3 years, 363 days	Infantry	Gordon Gray; Frank Pace; Robert T. Stevens	Louis A. Johnson; George C. Marshall; Robert A. Lovett; Charles Erwin Wilson	
19	Matthew B. Ridgway	General; Matthew B. Ridgway (1895–1993)	15 August 1953	29 June 1955	1 year, 319 days	Infantry	Robert T. Stevens	Charles Erwin Wilson	
20	Maxwell D. Taylor	General; Maxwell D. Taylor (1901–1987)	30 June 1955	30 June 1959 (Note: Appointed Military Representative of the President from 1959 to 1962; Chairman of the Joint Chiefs of Staff from 1962 to 1964.)	4 years, 0 days	Field artillery	Robert T. Stevens; Wilber M. Brucker	Charles Erwin Wilson; Neil H. McElroy	
21	Lyman L. Lemnitzer	General; Lyman L. Lemnitzer (1899–1988)	1 July 1959	30 September 1960	1 year, 91 days	Infantry and coast artillery	Wilber M. Brucker	Neil H. McElroy; Thomas S. Gates Jr.	
22	George H. Decker	General; George H. Decker (1902–1980)	1 October 1960	30 September 1962	1 year, 364 days	Infantry	Wilber M. Brucker; Elvis Stahr Jr. Cyrus Vance	Thomas S. Gates Jr. Robert McNamara	
23	Earle G. Wheeler	General; Earle G. Wheeler (1908–1975)	1 October 1962	2 July 1964	1 year, 275 days	Infantry and armor	Cyrus Vance; Stephen Ailes	Robert McNamara	
24	Harold K. Johnson	General; Harold K. Johnson (1912–1983)	3 July 1964	2 July 1968	3 years, 365 days	Infantry and cavalry	Stephen Ailes; Stanley Rogers Resor	Robert McNamara; Clark Clifford	
25	William C. Westmoreland	General; William C. Westmoreland (1914–2005)	3 July 1968	30 June 1972	3 years, 363 days	Field artillery	Stanley Rogers Resor; Robert Froehlke	Clark Clifford; Melvin Laird	
–	Bruce Palmer Jr.	General; Bruce Palmer Jr. (1913–2000); Acting (Note: In capacity as Vice Chief of Staff of the Army.)	1 July 1972	11 October 1972	102 days	Infantry and cavalry	Robert Froehlke	Melvin Laird	
26	Creighton W. Abrams Jr.	General; Creighton W. Abrams Jr. (1914–1974)	12 October 1972	4 September 1974 †	1 year, 327 days	Armor	Robert Froehlke; Bo Callaway	Melvin Laird; Elliot Richardson; James R. Schlesinger	
–		General; Frederick C. Weyand (1916–2010)	5 September 1974	4 October 1974	29 days	Infantry and intelligence	Bo Callaway; Martin R. Hoffmann	James R. Schlesinger; Donald Rumsfeld	
27		General; Frederick C. Weyand (1916–2010)	4 October 1974	30 September 1976	1 year, 362 days	Infantry and intelligence	Bo Callaway; Martin R. Hoffmann	James R. Schlesinger; Donald Rumsfeld	
28	Bernard W. Rogers	General; Bernard W. Rogers (1921–2008) (Note: Last World War II veteran to serve as Chief of Staff.)	1 October 1976	21 June 1979	2 years, 263 days	Infantry	Martin R. Hoffmann; Clifford Alexander Jr.	Donald Rumsfeld; Harold Brown	
29	Edward C. Meyer	General; Edward C. Meyer (1928–2020)	22 June 1979	21 June 1983	3 years, 364 days	Infantry	Clifford Alexander Jr. John O. Marsh Jr.	Harold Brown; Caspar Weinberger	
30	John A. Wickham Jr.	General; John A. Wickham Jr. (1928–2024)	23 June 1983	23 June 1987	4 years, 0 days	Infantry and cavalry	John O. Marsh Jr.	Caspar Weinberger	
31	Carl E. Vuono	General; Carl E. Vuono (born 1934)	23 June 1987	21 June 1991	3 years, 363 days	Field artillery	John O. Marsh Jr. Michael P. W. Stone	Caspar Weinberger; Frank Carlucci; Dick Cheney	
32	Gordon R. Sullivan	General; Gordon R. Sullivan (1937–2024)	21 June 1991	20 June 1995	3 years, 364 days	Armor and mechanized infantry	Michael P. W. Stone; Togo D. West Jr.	Dick Cheney; Les Aspin; William J. Perry	
33	Dennis J. Reimer	General; Dennis J. Reimer (born 1939)	20 June 1995	21 June 1999	4 years, 1 day	Artillery and mechanized infantry	Togo D. West Jr. Louis Caldera	William J. Perry; William Cohen	
34	Eric K. Shinseki	General; Eric K. Shinseki (born 1942) (Note: Last Vietnam War veteran to serve as Chief of Staff.)	21 June 1999	11 June 2003	3 years, 355 days	Cavalry	Louis Caldera; Thomas E. White	William Cohen; Donald Rumsfeld	
–	John M. Keane	General; John M. Keane (born 1943); Acting	11 June 2003	1 August 2003	51 days	Infantry	None (Note: Les Brownlee served as acting Secretary of the Army during this period.)	Donald Rumsfeld	
35	Peter J. Schoomaker	General; Peter J. Schoomaker (born 1946) (Note: Recalled to active duty to serve as Chief of Staff. Schoomaker previously served as Commander in Chief, United States Special Operations Command from 1997 to 2000.)	1 August 2003	10 April 2007	3 years, 252 days	Cavalry and special forces	Francis J. Harvey; Pete Geren	Donald Rumsfeld; Robert Gates	
36	George W. Casey Jr.	General; George W. Casey Jr. (born 1948)	10 April 2007	11 April 2011	4 years, 1 day	Armor and mechanized infantry	Pete Geren; John M. McHugh	Robert Gates	
37	Martin E. Dempsey	General; Martin E. Dempsey (born 1952)	11 April 2011	7 September 2011	149 days	Armor and armored cavalry	John M. McHugh	Robert Gates; Leon Panetta	
38	Raymond T. Odierno	General; Raymond T. Odierno (1954–2021)	7 September 2011	14 August 2015	3 years, 341 days	Field artillery	John M. McHugh	Leon Panetta; Chuck Hagel; Ash Carter	
39	Mark A. Milley	General; Mark A. Milley (born 1958)	14 August 2015	9 August 2019	3 years, 360 days	Armor and light infantry	John M. McHugh; Eric Fanning; Mark Esper; Ryan D. McCarthy	Ash Carter; Jim Mattis; Mark Esper	
40	James C. McConville	General; James C. McConville (born 1959)	9 August 2019	4 August 2023	3 years, 360 days	Aviation and cavalry	Ryan D. McCarthy; Christine Wormuth	Mark Esper; Lloyd Austin	
–		General; Randy A. George (born 1964)	4 August 2023	21 September 2023	48 days	Infantry	Christine Wormuth; Daniel P. Driscoll	Lloyd Austin; Pete Hegseth	
41		General; Randy A. George (born 1964)	21 September 2023	2 April 2026	2 years, 193 days	Infantry	Christine Wormuth; Daniel P. Driscoll	Lloyd Austin; Pete Hegseth	
–	Christopher C. LaNeve	General; Christopher C. LaNeve (born 1967); Acting	2 April 2026	Incumbent	233 days	Infantry	Daniel P. Driscoll	Pete Hegseth	

== See also ==
- Sergeant Major of the Army
- Army Staff Senior Warrant Officer
- Chief Warrant Officer of the Army
- Vice Chief of Staff of the United States Army
- Deputy Chief of Staff of the United States Army
