= Bernard D. Rostker =

American government official (born 1944)

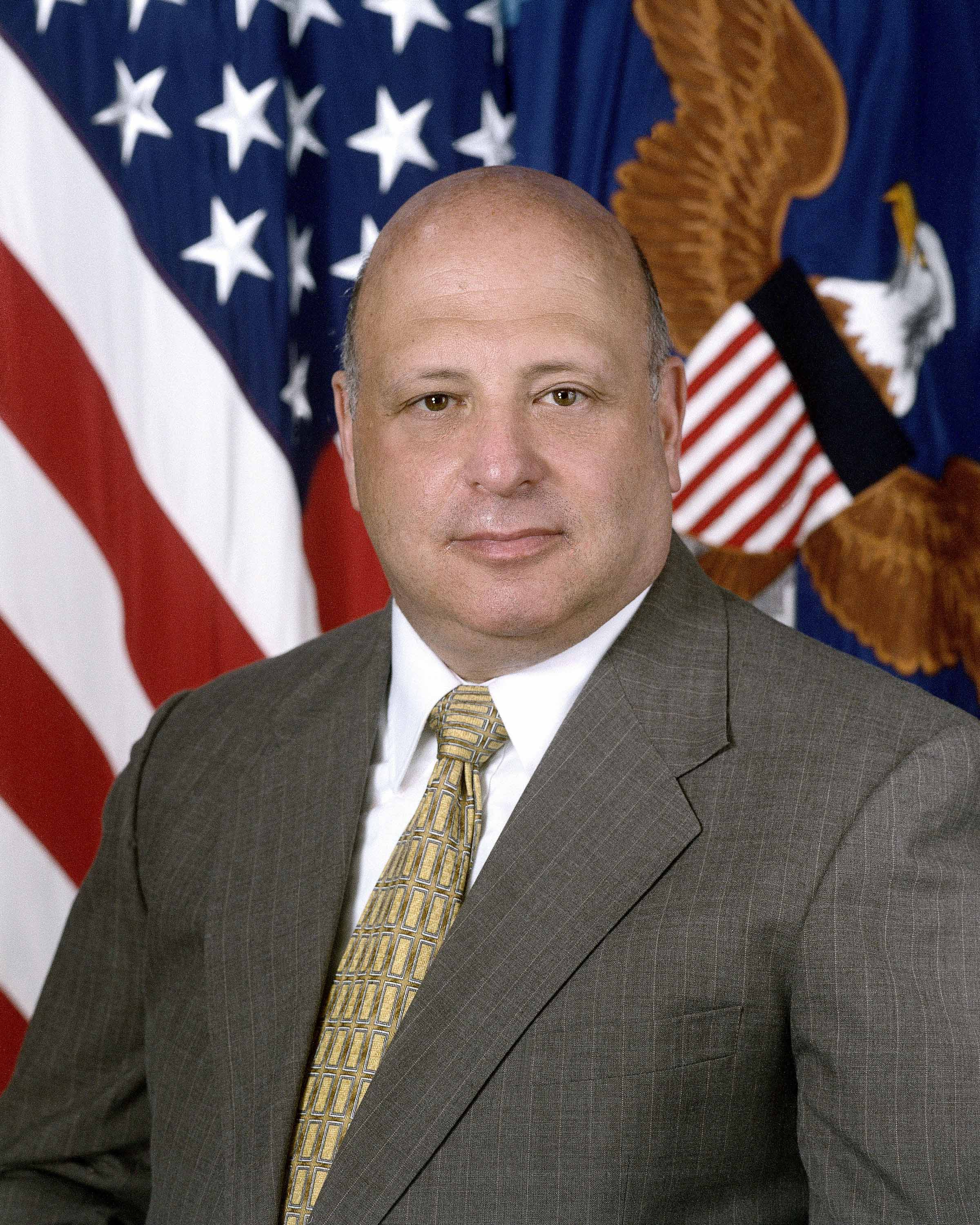

United States Under Secretary of Defense for Personnel and Readiness
- In office May 23, 2000 – January 19, 2001
- President: Bill Clinton; George W. Bush
- Preceded by: Rudy de Leon
- Succeeded by: David S. C. Chu

United States Under Secretary of the Army
- In office October 1998 – May 23, 2000
- President: Bill Clinton
- Preceded by: Robert M. Walker
- Succeeded by: Gregory R. Dahlberg

United States Assistant Secretary of the Navy for Manpower and Reserve Affairs
- In office October 7, 1994 – October 1998
- President: Bill Clinton
- Preceded by: Frederick Pang
- Succeeded by: Carolyn H. Becraft

5th Director of the Selective Service System
- In office November 26, 1979 – July 31, 1981
- President: Jimmy Carter; Ronald Reagan
- Preceded by: Byron V. Pepitone; Robert E. Shuck (acting)
- Succeeded by: Thomas K. Turnage; James G. Bond (acting)

Personal details
- Born: Bernard Daniel Rostker; February 1, 1944 (age 82) Bronx, New York, U.S.
- Spouse: Louise
- Education: New York University (BS); Syracuse University (MA, PhD)

Military service
- Allegiance: United States
- Branch/service: United States Army Reserve
- Years of service: 1968–1970
- Rank: Captain

Bernard Daniel Rostker (born February 1, 1944) was Principal Deputy Assistant Secretary of the Navy (Manpower and Reserve Affairs) from 1977 to 1979; 5th Director of the Selective Service System from 1979 to 1981; Assistant Secretary of the Navy (Manpower and Reserve Affairs) from 1994 to 1998; Under Secretary of the Army from 1998 to 2000; and Under Secretary of Defense for Personnel and Readiness in 2000–2001. From 1996 to 2001, he also served as Special Assistant to the Deputy Secretary of Defense for Gulf War Illnesses.

== Early life and education ==
Rostker was born in The Bronx in 1944 and graduated from Taft High School in June 1960 at the age of sixteen. He then attended New York University, receiving a B.S. in Education and Economics in 1964. While in college, he participated in the Reserve Officers' Training Corps, graduating as a Distinguished Military Graduate and being commissioned as a Second Lieutenant in the United States Army Reserve. He next attended Syracuse University's Maxwell School of Citizenship and Public Affairs, earning an M.A. in Economics in 1966 and then a Ph.D. in Economics in 1970. His master's thesis was entitled The economics of manpower retraining and his doctoral thesis was entitled Manpower theory and policy and the residual occupational elasticity of substitution. His doctoral advisor was Jerry Miner.

== Early career ==
In 1968, he reported for active duty in the Army and joined the Manpower Requirements Directorate of the Office of the Assistant Secretary of Defense for Systems Analysis as an economist. After completing his military commitment at the rank of Captain two years later, he joined RAND as a research economist, becoming Program Director of the Manpower Personnel and Training Program, a program sponsored by the United States Air Force.

He joined the United States Department of the Navy in 1977, upon being named Principal Deputy Assistant Secretary of the Navy for Manpower and Reserve Affairs.

In 1979, he became Director of the Selective Service System, holding this post November 26, 1979 – July 31, 1981. The selective service registration requirement for all U.S. men aged 18–25, had been abolished by President Gerald Ford in 1975, but was reestablished when President Jimmy Carter signed Proclamation 4771, Registration Under the Military Selective Service Act on July 2, 1980, retroactively re-establishing the Selective Service registration requirement for all 18- to 26-year-old male citizens born on or after January 1, 1960. Rostker thus oversaw the Selective Service Revitalization Plan which registered four million men for selective service. He is the named defendant in the U.S. Supreme Court case of Rostker v. Goldberg, 453 U.S. 57 (1981), which upheld the constitutionality of requiring only men to register for selective service.

Rostker joined the Center for Naval Analyses in 1981, becoming Director for the Navy's Management Program. In that capacity he conducted research into the major management issues facing the United States Navy.

In 1983, he joined software development company SRA International as Director of the Systems Management Division. He returned to RAND in December 1984 to help establish the Arroyo Center, the Army's federally funded research and development center for studies and analysis. He served as Program Director of the Force Development and Employment Program and associate director of the center. In January 1990, he shifted to RAND's National Defense Research Institute as Director of the Defense Manpower Research Center.

== Clinton administration ==
In October 1994, President Bill Clinton nominated Rostker as Assistant Secretary of the Navy (Manpower and Reserve Affairs) and Rostker subsequently held this office from October 1994 until October 1998. On November 12, 1996, he was also named Special Assistant to the Deputy Secretary of Defense for Gulf War Illnesses and became responsible for coordinating and overseeing all of the United States Department of Defense's responses to Gulf War Illnesses.

President Clinton nominated Rostker as Under Secretary of the Army and he was sworn in on October 26, 1998, while retaining his responsibilities for Gulf War Illness issues. As Under Secretary of the Army, Rostker was the No. 2 civilian in the United States Department of the Army; was responsible for assisting the Secretary of the Army in recruiting, organizing, supplying, equipping, training and mobilizing the Army and managing its $64 billion annual budget and more than 1.3 million active duty, National Guard, Army Reserve and civilian personnel; and assumed the duties of acting Secretary of the Army when the Secretary was not available.

After a nomination from President Clinton and confirmation by the United States Senate, Rostker was sworn in as the Under Secretary of Defense for Personnel and Readiness on May 23, 2000. In that capacity, he was the senior adviser to the United States Secretary of Defense on recruitment, career development, pay and benefits for 1.4 million active duty military personnel, 1.3 million Guard and Reserve personnel and 725,000 DoD civilians. He also oversaw the Military Health System, the Defense Commissary Agency, the Army and Air Force Exchange Service, the Department of Defense Education Activity, and the Defense Equal Opportunity Management Institute. He was also responsible for overseeing research on the nation's military readiness. Rostker was replaced by David S. C. Chu, who was sworn in as Under Secretary of Defense for Personnel and Readiness on June 1, 2001. He was a resident of Great Falls, Virginia during his service in the Clinton Administration.

== Later life ==
Upon leaving government service, Rostker returned to RAND and his research there has focused on managing the recruitment, retention, and performance of police officers in large city departments; managing the volunteer military; and reforming the military by lengthening military careers.

== Personal ==
Rostker married Louise Cowen, whom he met in graduate school at Syracuse, in 1966. They have two sons.

== Publications ==
- Bernard D. Rostker et al., Recruitment and Retention: Lessons for the New Orleans Police Department, RAND Corporation, 2007
- Bernard D. Rostker, America Goes to War: Managing the Force During Times of Stress and Uncertainty, RAND Corporation, 2007
- Bernard D. Rostker, I Want You! The Evolution of the All-Volunteer Force, RAND Corporation, 2006

Government offices
| Preceded by Robert E. Shuck | Director of the Selective Service System; November 26, 1979 – July 31, 1981 | Succeeded by James G. Bond |
| Preceded by Frederick Pang | Assistant Secretary of the Navy (Manpower and Reserve Affairs); October 1994 – October 1998 | Succeeded by Carolyn H. Becraft |
| Preceded by Robert M. Walker | United States Under Secretary of the Army; October 1998 – May 2000 | Succeeded by Gregory R. Dahlberg |
| Preceded by Rudy de Leon | Under Secretary of Defense for Personnel and Readiness; May 23, 2000 – ca. June 2001 | Succeeded by David S. C. Chu |
