= Gregory R. Dahlberg =

American government official (born 1951)

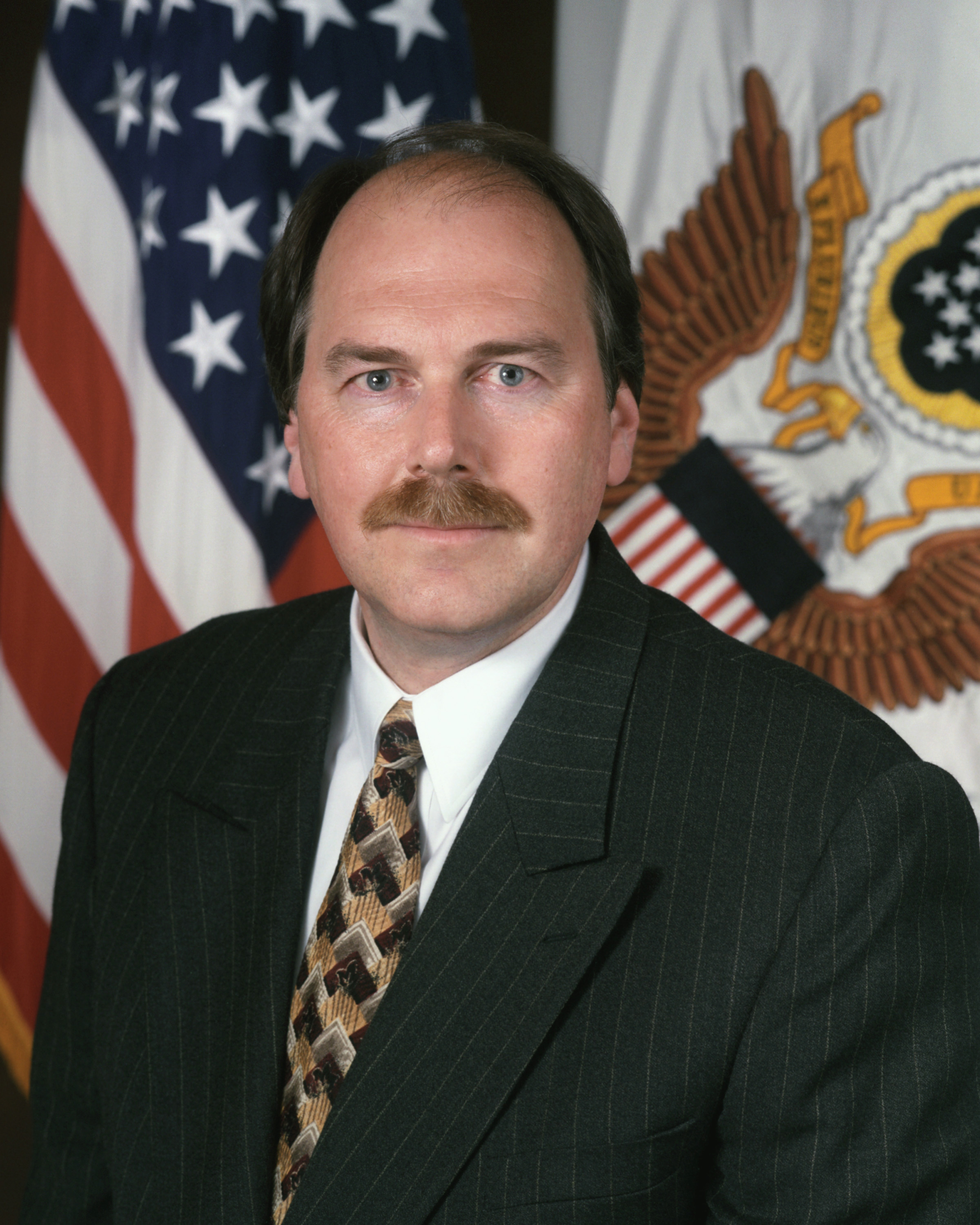

United States Under Secretary of the Army
- In office May 23, 2000 – March 4, 2001
- Preceded by: Bernard D. Rostker
- Succeeded by: Les Brownlee

Personal details
- Born: Gregory Robert Dahlberg; November 23, 1951 (age 74) Pickstown, South Dakota, U.S.
- Education: Luther College; American University

Gregory Robert Dahlberg (born November 23, 1951) was United States Under Secretary of the Army from 2000 to 2001.

== Biography ==
Gregory R. Dahlberg was raised in the Minneapolis – Saint Paul area. After high school, he attended Luther College in Decorah, Iowa, receiving a B.A. in Business Administration and Political Science in 1973. He then attended the American University in Washington, D.C., receiving an M.P.A. in 1976.

After graduating, Dahlberg took a job with the United States Department of Transportation in the Office of the Assistant Secretary for Budget and Program, with his work focusing on highway construction and budget and finance issues related to transportation. In 1981, he joined the staff of the United States House Appropriations Subcommittee on Transportation, Housing and Urban Development, and Related Agencies, a subcommittee of the United States House Committee on Appropriations; there, he worked on the budgets of the Federal Highway Administration, the National Highway Traffic Safety Administration, the Urban Mass Transportation Administration, Amtrak, Conrail, and the United States Coast Guard. In 1990, he joined the staff of the full Appropriations Committee. During the debate over the Omnibus Budget Reconciliation Act of 1990 (in which George H. W. Bush reneged on his campaign promise "Read my lips: no new taxes"), Dahlberg helped author the Budget Enforcement Act of 1990. While on the staff of the House Appropriations Committee, he also worked on the FDA Fast Track Development Program, and the special financing structure of Operation Desert Storm. In 1995, he became the Democratic Staff Director of the United States House Appropriations Subcommittee on Defense, in which capacity he was involved in all negotiations related to the budget of the United States Department of Defense.

In 2000, President of the United States Bill Clinton nominated Dahlberg as United States Under Secretary of the Army and he subsequently held this post from May 23, 2000 to March 4, 2001. He was Acting United States Secretary of the Army from January 20, 2001 to March 4, 2001.

Since leaving the United States Department of the Army in 2001, Dahlberg worked for Lockheed Martin as Senior Vice President, Strategic Enterprises, retiring in August 2015. He works as an independent consultant.

Government offices
Preceded by Bernard D. Rostker	United States Under Secretary of the Army; May 23, 2000 – March 4, 2001	Succeeded by Les Brownlee
Preceded by Louis Caldera	United States Secretary of the Army (acting); January 20, 2001 – March 4, 2001	Succeeded by Joseph W. Westphal (acting); Thomas E. White
