= Fort Myer =

- Fort Myer Historic District
- U.S. National Register of Historic Places
- U.S. National Historic Landmark District
- Virginia Landmarks Register
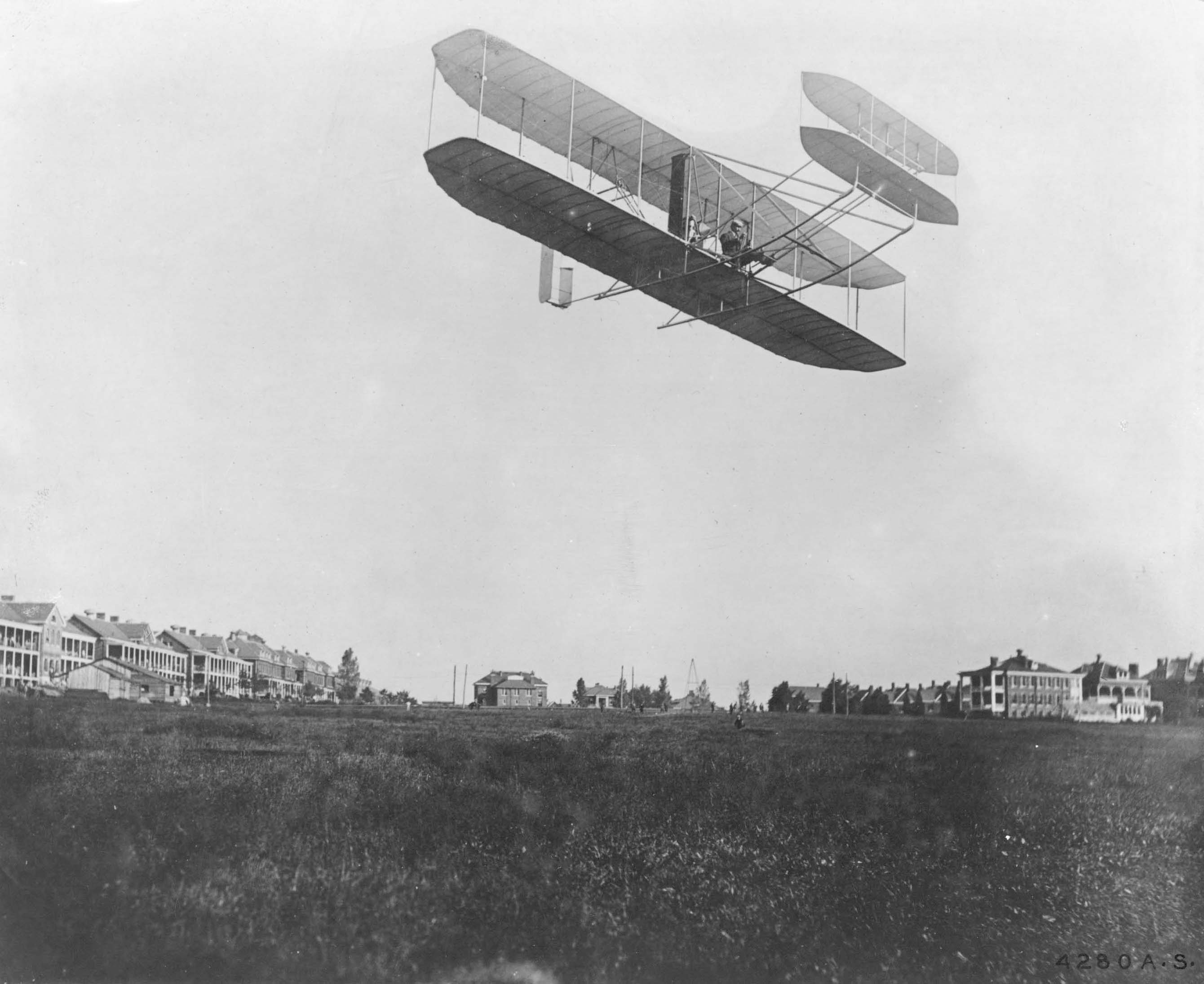
- Orville Wright flying at Fort Myer; September 9, 1908

- Location within District of Columbia
- Location: Arlington County, Virginia
- Coordinates: 38.880343°N 77.079735°W
- Built: 1861
- Architect: US Army
- Architectural style: Late Victorian
- NRHP reference No.: 72001380
- VLR No.: 000-0004

Significant dates
- Added to NRHP: November 28, 1972
- Designated NHLD: November 28, 1972
- Designated VLR: June 19, 1973

Fort Myer is the previous name used for a U.S. Army post next to Arlington National Cemetery in Arlington County, Virginia, and across the Potomac River from Washington, D.C. Founded during the American Civil War as Fort Cass and Fort Whipple, the post merged in 2005 with the neighboring Marine Corps installation, Henderson Hall, and is today named Joint Base Myer–Henderson Hall.

== History ==
In 1861, the land that Fort Myer would eventually occupy was part of the Arlington estate, which Mary Anna Custis Lee, the wife of Robert E. Lee, owned and at which Lee resided when not stationed elsewhere (see Arlington House, The Robert E. Lee Memorial). When the Civil War began, the Commonwealth of Virginia seceded from the United States, Lee resigned his commission, and he and his wife left the estate. The United States Government then confiscated the estate and began to use it as a burial ground for Union Army dead (see Arlington National Cemetery), established the Freedman's Village settlement on Arlington's grounds that provided housing and education for emancipated contraband, and built forts and other defenses within the vicinity along the Arlington Line of the Civil War defenses of Washington (see Washington, D.C., in the American Civil War).

=== Fort Cass ===
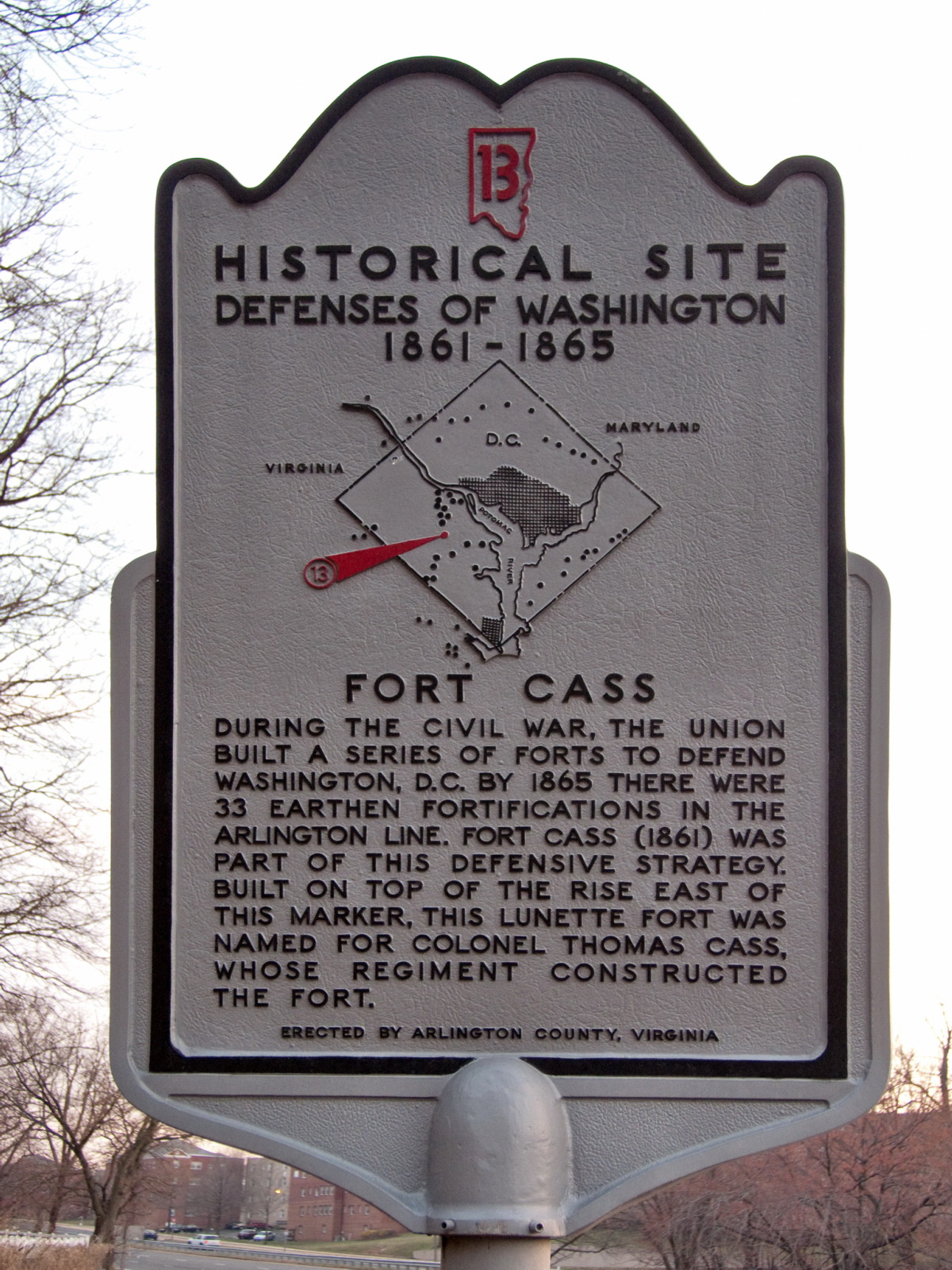
Fort Cass Historical Marker

Shortly after the Union Army's rout at the First Battle of Bull Run (Manassas) in late July 1861, the Army constructed in August 1861 a lunette (Fort Ramsay) on the future grounds of Fort Myer. One of the first fortifications built on the Arlington Line, the lunette was located at and near the present post's Forest Circle. Later renamed to Fort Cass, the lunette had a perimeter of 288 yards (263 m) and emplacements for 12 guns.

A May 17, 1864, report from the Union Army's Inspector of Artillery (see Union Army artillery organization) noted the following:

Fort Cass, Maj. N. Shatswell commanding.–Garrison, two companies First Massachusetts Heavy Artillery—8 commissioned officers, 1 ordnance-sergeant, 220 men. Armament, three 6-pounder field guns (smooth), five 20-pounder Parrotts (rifled), three 24-pounder siege guns (smooth), one 24-pounder F. D. howitzer (smooth), one 24-pounder Coehorn mortar. Magazines, two; dry and in good condition. Ammunition, full supply, well packed and in serviceable condition. Implements, complete and serviceable. Drill in artillery, fair. Drill in infantry, fair. Discipline, fair. Garrison sufficient for the work.

Although the Army abandoned the lunette in 1865 at the end of the Civil War, the United States War Department continued to control its property.

=== Fort Whipple ===
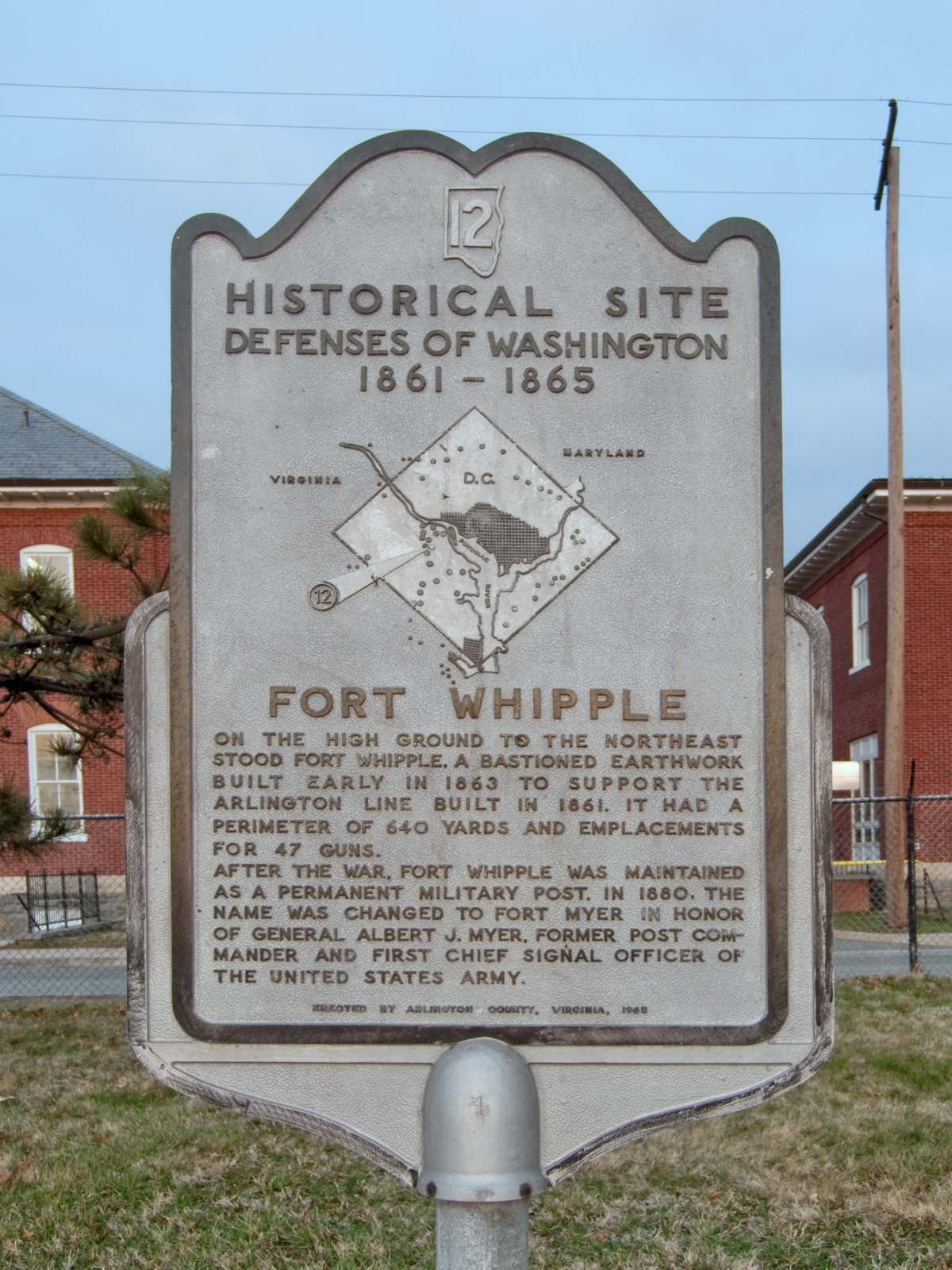
Fort Whipple Historical Marker

Arlington, Va. Capt. Nevins and officers in front of headquarters, Fort Whipple, 1865; mourning crepe drawn over doors and windows

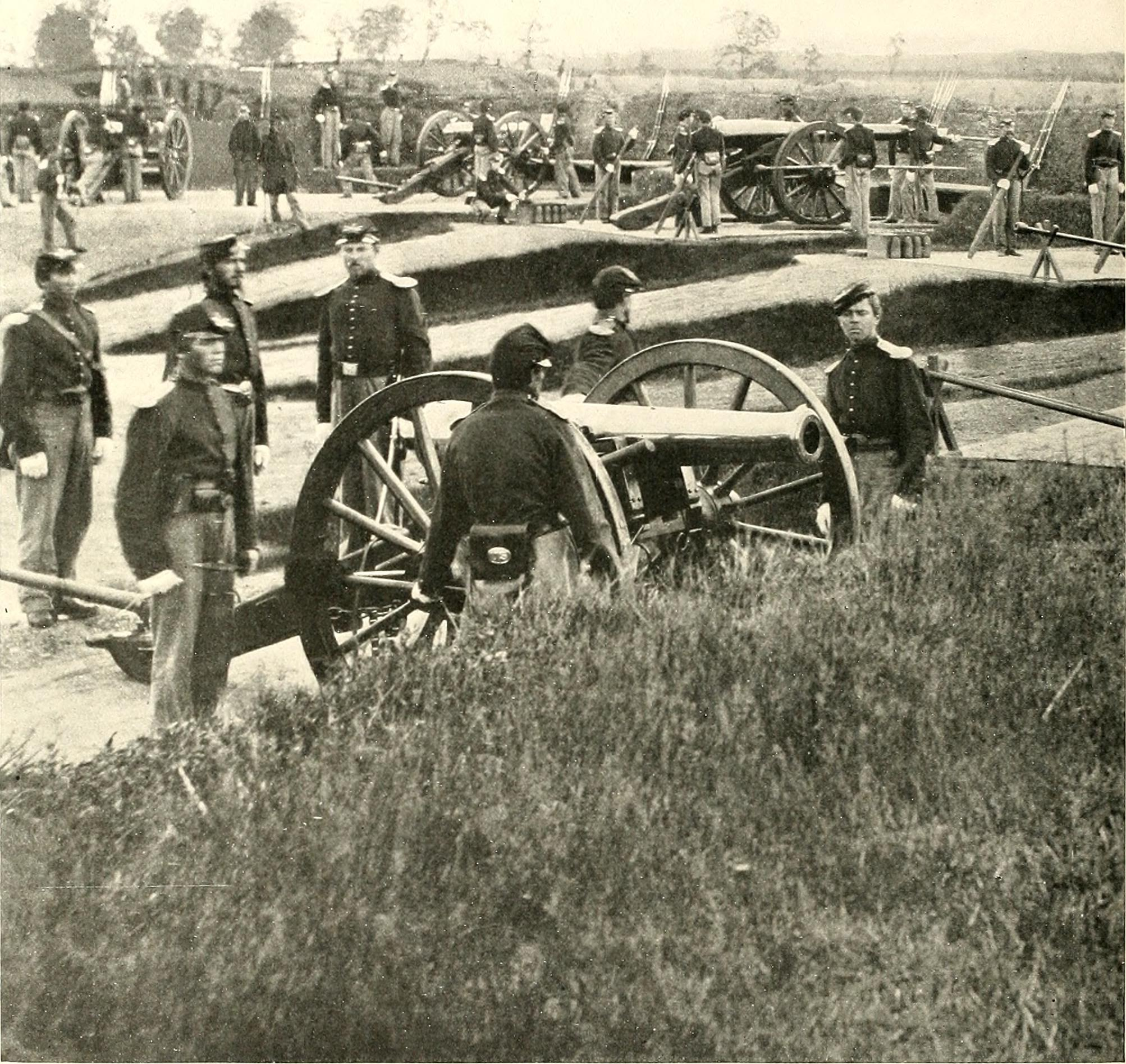
Battery No. 2 at Fort Whipple

Following the Union Army's defeat at the Second Battle of Bull Run (Manassas) in August 1862, the Army constructed Fort Whipple on the grounds of the former Arlington estate during the spring of 1863. The fort was located a short distance southeast of Fort Cass. The Army named the fort after Brevet Major General Amiel Weeks Whipple, who died in May 1863 of wounds received during the Battle of Chancellorsville. The fort was considered to be one of the strongest fortifications erected for the defense of Washington during the Civil War. It had a perimeter of 658 yards and places for 43 guns.

The May 17, 1864, report from the Union Army's Inspector of Artillery noted the following:

Fort Whipple, Major Rolfe commanding.–Garrison, three companies First Massachusetts Heavy Artillery– l major, 13 commissioned officers, 1 ordnance-sergeant, 414 men. Armament, six 12-pounder field guns (smooth), four 12-pounder field howitzers (smooth), eight 12-pounder James guns (rifled), eleven 4.5-inch ordnance Magazines, four; two not in a serviceable condition. Ammunition, full supply; good condition. Implements, complete and serviceable. Drill in artillery, fair. Drill in infantry, fair. Discipline, fair. Garrison sufficient; interior work.

The Civil War ended in 1865. Fort Whipple, with its fortifications abandoned, then became the home of the Signal School of Instruction for Army and Navy Officers, established in 1869.

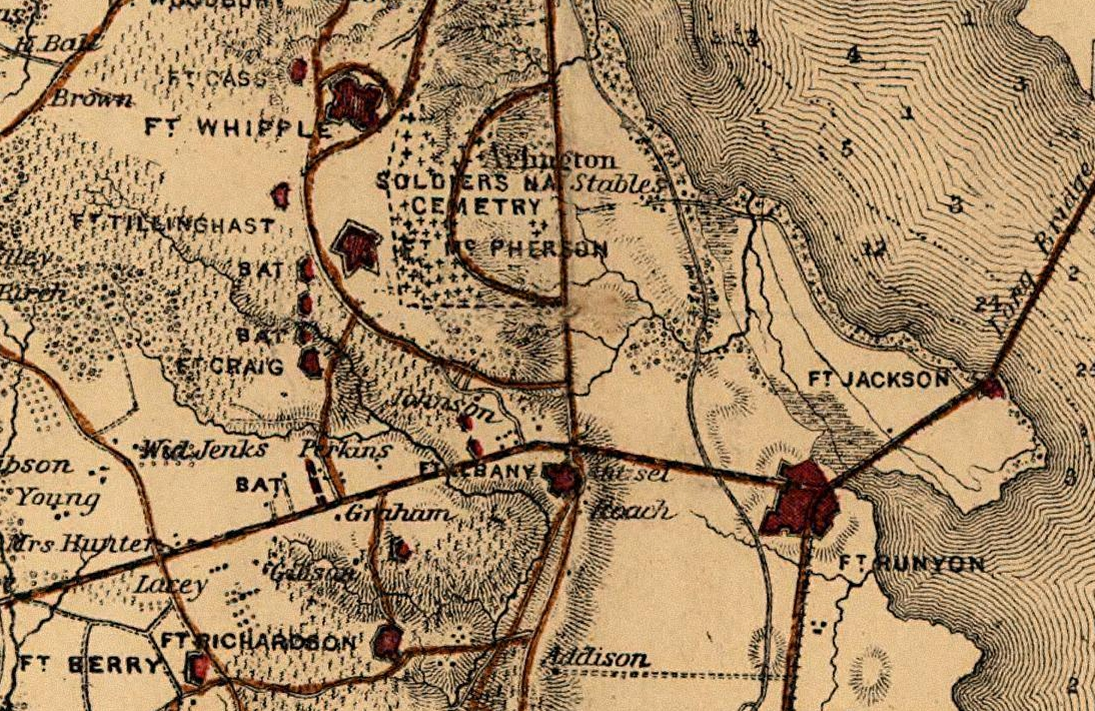
Map of Fort Craig and surrounding area including Fort Whipple and Fort Cass (1865)

=== Fort Myer ===
On February 4, 1881, the Army post containing Fort Whipple was renamed Fort Myer as an honor to Brigadier General Albert J. Myer, who had commanded the newly established Signal School of Instruction for Army and Navy Officers from 1869 until he died in August 1880. Since then, the post has been a Signal Corps post, a showcase for the US Army's cavalry, and, since the 1940s, home to the Army's elite ceremonial units—The United States Army Band ("Pershing's Own") and the 3rd U.S. Infantry Regiment ("The Old Guard").

The National Weather Service was originated there by General Albert J. Myer in 1870.

Fort Myer was the site of the first flight of an aircraft at a military installation. Several exhibition flights by Orville Wright took place there in 1908. On 17 September 1908 it became the location of the first airplane fatality, as Lt. Thomas Selfridge was killed when on a demonstration flight with Orville, at an altitude of about 100 feet (30 m), a propeller split, sending the aircraft out of control. Selfridge suffered a concussion in the crash and later died, the first person to die in powered fixed-wing aircraft. Orville was badly injured, suffering broken ribs and a leg.

Quarters One on Fort Myer, which was originally built as the garrison commander's quarters, has been the home of the Chief of Staff of the United States Army since 1908 when Major General J. Franklin Bell took up residence. It has been the home of every succeeding Chief of Staff, except for General John J. Pershing.

The United States Navy established the nation's first radio telecommunications station, NAA, near Fort Myer in 1913. In 1915, the station's radio towers, "The Three Sisters", transmitted to Paris the first wireless communication that crossed the Atlantic Ocean.

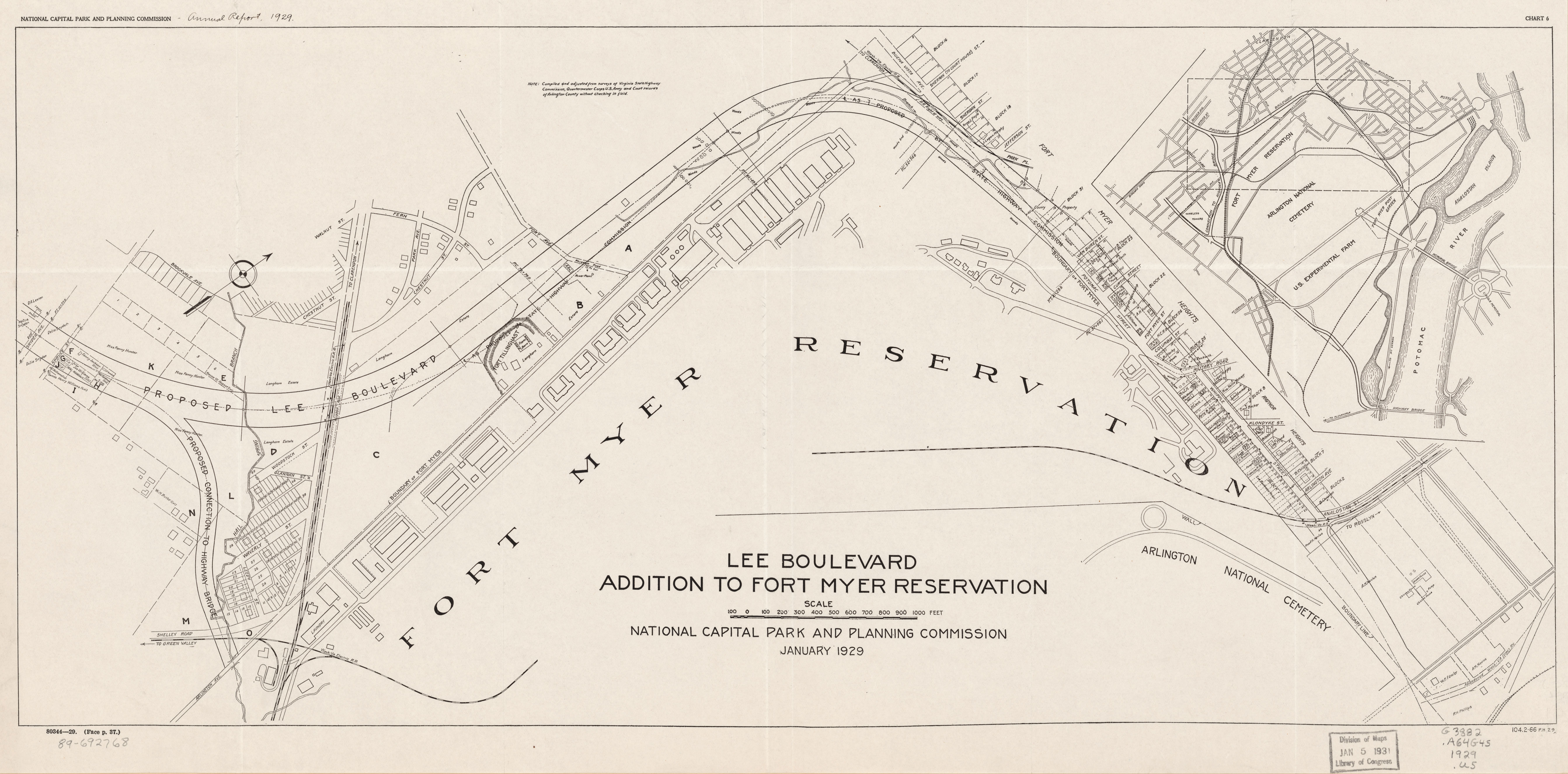
Lee Boulevard addition to Fort Myer Reservation in 1929

During World War I, Fort Myer was a staging area for a large number of engineering, artillery, and chemical companies and regiments. The area of Fort Myer now occupied by Andrew Rader Health Clinic and the Commissary were made into a trench-system training grounds where French officers taught the Americans about trench warfare.

General of the Armies of the United States John Pershing and Col. Harry Cootes, commander of Fort Myer, review the Machine Gun Troop of the 10th Cavalry Regiment upon its posting to Fort Myer in 1931. The 10th were some of the first black troops to serve at Fort Myer, Va.

General George S. Patton Jr., who was posted at Fort Myer four different times, started the charitable "Society Circus" after World War I. He ultimately was post commander and commanded the 3rd Cavalry Regiment that was stationed at Fort Myer from the 1920s to 1942 when the regiment was sent to Georgia to get mechanized.

In late 2001, troops, deployed in response to the September 11th attacks, were bivouacked at Fort Myer. These troops were under Operation Noble Eagle. These included both active and National Guard Military Police units from around the nation. In 2005 the last remaining deployed responders were demobilized.

=== Joint Base Myer–Henderson Hall ===
As a result of the 2005 Base Realignment and Closure Commission initiative to create more efficiency of efforts, the Army's Fort Myer and the Marines' Henderson Hall became the first Joint Base in the Department of Defense. Joint Base Myer–Henderson Hall (JBMHH) consists of military installations at Fort Myer, Henderson Hall, The Pentagon, and Fort Lesley J. McNair. These installations and departments serve over 150,000 active duty, DoD civilian, and retired military personnel in the region.

== Commemorative ==
The fort was designated a National Historic Landmark in 1972, for its well-preserved concentration of cavalry facilities and officers' quarters, and for its importance in military aviation history. On September 1, 1970, the United States Postal Service issued its first day cover of a postcard celebrating the 100th anniversary of Weather Services at Fort Myer.

A pamphlet and one book have been published about Fort Myer. The book, Images of America: Fort Myer, contains a copy of a handwritten letter from Abraham Lincoln that appointed General Whipple's oldest son to the United States Military Academy at West Point.

== See also ==
- List of National Historic Landmarks in Virginia
- National Register of Historic Places listings in Arlington County, Virginia
