= Louis Caldera =

Former Director of the White House Military Office

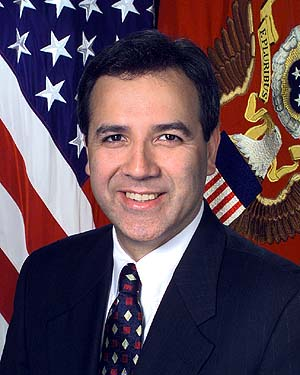
- Official portrait, 1998

Director of the White House Military Office
- In office January 20, 2009 – May 22, 2009
- President: Barack Obama
- Preceded by: Raymond Spicer
- Succeeded by: George D. Mulligan

18th President of the University of New Mexico
- In office August 1, 2003 – August 1, 2006
- Preceded by: F. Chris Garcia
- Succeeded by: David W. Harris

17th United States Secretary of the Army
- In office July 2, 1998 – January 20, 2001
- President: Bill Clinton
- Preceded by: Togo D. West Jr.
- Succeeded by: Thomas E. White

Member of the California State Assembly from the 46th district
- In office December 7, 1992 – September 2, 1997
- Preceded by: Barbara Friedman
- Succeeded by: Gil Cedillo

Personal details
- Born: Luís Eduardo Caldera; April 1, 1956 (age 70) El Paso, Texas, U.S.
- Party: Democratic
- Spouse: Eva Caldera
- Children: 3
- Education: United States Military Academy (BS); Harvard University (JD, MBA)

Military service
- Branch/service: United States Army
- Years of service: 1978–1983
- Rank: Captain

Louis Edward Caldera (born April 1, 1956) is an American politician and member of the Democratic Party who served as the director of the White House Military Office from January to May 2009, as the 17th United States Secretary of the Army from July 1998 to January 2001 and as a California State Assemblyman from January 1992 to January 1997.

== Family and education ==
Caldera's family left Texas for California when he was 4 years old, living briefly in public housing in the Boyle Heights neighborhood of Los Angeles before moving to the suburb of Whittier. Caldera graduated from Monte Vista High School in 1974. He earned a Bachelor of Science degree in 1978 from the United States Military Academy at West Point, New York, then served on active duty from 1978 to 1983, mostly at Fort Dix, New Jersey. He went on to enroll at Harvard University and in 1987, earned a joint JD–MBA degree from Harvard Law School and Harvard Business School respectively.

While studying at Harvard, he met his wife, Eva Orlebeke Caldera; together they have three daughters - Allegra, Sophia, and Camille, all of whom are Harvard undergraduates.

== Law career ==
After graduating from Harvard, Caldera practiced law from 1987 to 1990 at O'Melveny & Myers, then from 1990 to 1991 at Buchalter, Nemer, Fields and Younger. From 1991 to 1992 he was a Deputy Counsel for Los Angeles County.

== California State Assembly ==
Caldera served as a California State Assemblyman from 1992 to 1997, representing the nearly 400,000 residents of California's 46th State Assembly district, which is located in and around downtown Los Angeles. As an Assemblyman, he served as chairman of the Banking and Finance Committee, the Revenue and Taxation Committee, and the Budget Committee.

== Secretary of the Army ==
Before finishing his third term in the Assembly, Caldera resigned to begin serving as managing director and chief operating officer for President Bill Clinton's Corporation for National and Community Service (1997–1998), a domestic volunteer program.

On May 22, 1998, Clinton announced Caldera as his selection for Secretary of the Army. On July 2, 1998, Caldera was sworn in as the 17th Secretary of the Army by Secretary of Defense William Cohen.

== Other positions ==
He went on to serve as Vice Chancellor for University Advancement in the California State University System, the largest four-year university system in the country.

Caldera became the 18th president of the University of New Mexico (UNM) in August 2003, and left that position in January 2006. Caldera's selection was controversial, considering there was a lack of faculty approval prior to his official selection. The UNM General Faculty took a vote on the appointment of Caldera, and 78% voted against his appointment. Many students pointed out that he did not have a PhD, and would be in a position of overseeing PhD candidates. Still, others chose to point out that Caldera had more than a few conflicts of interest as a former Secretary of the Army and as a member of several corporate boards.

Caldera's contract with the University granted him an appointment as a tenured member of the University of New Mexico School of Law faculty, despite never having taught a law school course prior to his appointment.

Caldera served on the board of directors of IndyMac Bank from 2002 until its failure, and subsequent seizure by the government, in July 2008.

Caldera served on the board of directors for Southwest Airlines until he submitted his resignation, effective January 15, 2009, in connection with his selection to serve as director of the White House Military Office.

In June 2010 Caldera was appointed to the role of Vice President of Programs for the Jack Kent Cooke Foundation, a non-profit organization that has awarded 1,200 scholarships totaling more than $60 million to high-achieving low-income students, and has given more than $46 million in grants to nonprofit organizations that have similar missions. Caldera left the Cooke Foundation in March 2012.

Caldera is now President of "Caldera Associates", where he "provide(s) consulting services to for-profit and non-profit clients in the national security, education, philanthropic and human services delivery sectors".

Louis Caldera is a Distinguished Adjunct Professor of Law and a Senior Affiliate in the Program on Law and Government at American University Washington College of Law (WCL). Prior to joining WCL, Caldera taught courses in Legislation and Legislative Process, Election Law/Law of Democracy, State and Local Advocacy, and Corporate Governance at Loyola Law School, The University of New Mexico, and The George Washington University.

== Aircraft photo mission controversy ==
During his tenure as director of the White House Military Office, Caldera approved a mission conducted on April 27, 2009, where a Boeing VC-25 (a Boeing 747 military variant that is denominated Air Force One when the president of the United States is aboard), followed by an F-16 military fighter jet, performed low-altitude fly-overs of New York City and New Jersey. The mission "was set up to create an iconic shot of Air Force One, similar to one that was taken in recent years over the Grand Canyon."

While the FAA and select local authorities were given some degree of notification in advance, many other officials and the general public were not. The fly-over of the lower Manhattan financial district created a panic. Many feared it was another terrorist attack like the one that destroyed the twin towers of the World Trade Center on September 11, 2001, or an aborted attack attempt, because of the F-16 following the presidential plane. This led scores of people to leave their desks and large office buildings to be evacuated in a speedy but impromptu fashion.

New York City police stated that "federal authorities" told them not to disclose information about the fly-over to the public in advance. President Obama was also not informed beforehand. Like New York City Mayor Michael Bloomberg, President Obama only learned of the incident after the disturbance it caused was already being reported by journalists, bloggers, websites and news outlets.

The incident brought intense scrutiny and numerous highly critical comments directed at Caldera. White House officials said President Obama was fuming mad and did not see the need for a new Air Force One publicity photo anyway. Mayor Bloomberg condemned the low flyover and the failure to provide public notice, saying he himself had not been adequately notified, that he was "furious", and that it showed "poor judgment". Senator John McCain stated the flyover photo op was "a fundamentally unsound exercise in military judgment and may have constituted an inappropriate use of Department of Defense resources." The cost of setting up the flyover photo was reportedly $328,835. Observers noted that an expense like this would have been incurred whether or not the photo shoot had been carried out. VC-25 flying time requirements dictate the need for regular training flights. Had the flyover not been ordered, a similar expense would have been incurred in the normal course of VC-25 flight training.

After meeting with White House officials Caldera issued a public apology for the incident, stating: "Last week, I approved a mission over New York. I take responsibility for that decision. While federal authorities took the proper steps to notify state and local authorities in New York and New Jersey, it's clear that the mission created confusion and disruption. I apologize and take responsibility for any distress that flight caused."

Following an investigation into how the decision to conduct the flight had been reached, directed by Deputy White House Chief of Staff Jim Messina, Caldera announced his resignation on May 8, 2009, effective May 22, 2009. Notable in the investigation is Caldera's explanation of why he did not read an email from his Deputy Director, George Mulligan: "During our interview, the Director (Caldera) also offered another explanation for his failure to read the email. When he returned from Mexico, he was suffering from severe muscle spasms in his back. Doctors prescribed pain medications, he had difficulty walking around the office, and he went home early a couple days."

Political offices
Preceded by Barbara Friedman	Member of the California Assembly from the 46th district 1992–1997	Succeeded by Gil Cedillo
Political offices
Preceded by Robert Walker	United States Secretary of the Army; 1998–2001	Succeeded by Gregory Dahlberg; Acting
Preceded by Raymond Spicer	Director of the White House Military Office; 2009	Succeeded by George Mulligan
Academic offices
Preceded by Chris Garcia	President of the University of New Mexico; 2003–2006	Succeeded by David Harris
