= Robert M. Walker =

American government official (born 1948)

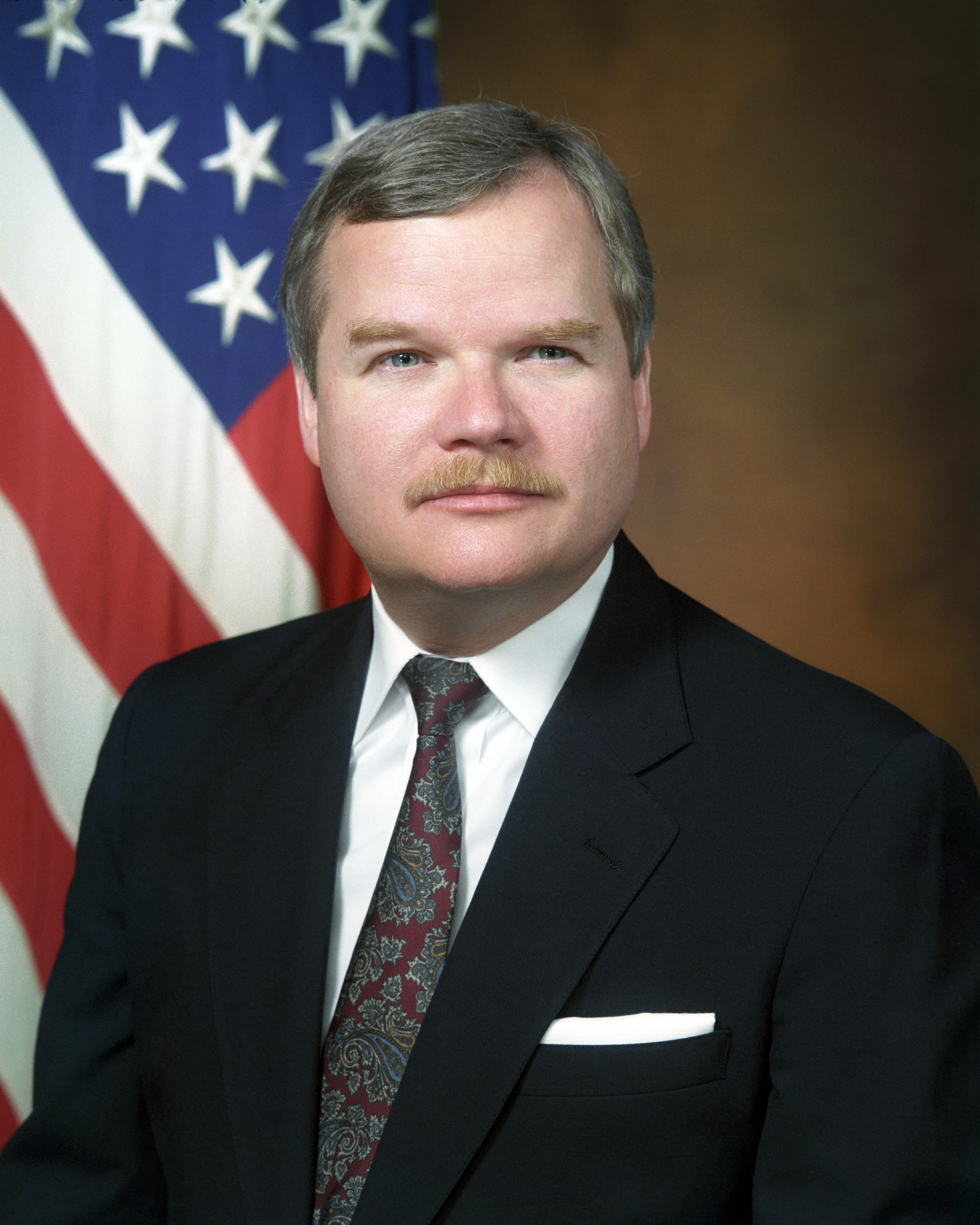

Acting United States Secretary of the Army
- In office December 2, 1997 – July 1, 1998
- President: Bill Clinton
- Preceded by: Joe R. Reeder
- Succeeded by: Louis Caldera

United States Under Secretary of the Army
- In office November 13, 1997 – October 15, 1998
- President: Bill Clinton
- Preceded by: Joe R. Reeder
- Succeeded by: Bernard D. Rostker

Personal details
- Born: Robert Michael Walker; September 14, 1948 (age 78) Martin, Tennessee, U.S.
- Education: University of Tennessee

Military service
- Allegiance: United States of America
- Branch/service: United States Army ( Army National Guard)
- Years of service: 1969–1975
- Unit: Tennessee Army National Guard

Robert Michael "Mike" Walker (born September 14, 1948) is the former United States Under Secretary of the Army (1997–1998).

== Biography ==
Walker was born in Martin, Tennessee, in 1948. He attended Martin High School until 1965 and graduated from DeKalb County High School in Smithville, Tennessee in May 1966. Walker then attended the University of Tennessee, Knoxville until January 1969, but did not earn a degree. He also studied at the University of Maryland, College Park in 1969. From 1969-76, Walker worked as a staff assistant to Rep. Joe L. Evins (D–Tenn. 4).

Walker joined the staff of Senator Jim Sasser (D–Tenn.) in 1977. He also served as an enlisted soldier in the Tennessee Army National Guard and District of Columbia Army National Guard in the 1970s.

From 1978–93, Walker served as a professional staff member of the United States Senate Committee on Appropriations and staff director of the United States Senate Appropriations Subcommittee on Military Construction.

In 1993, President of the United States Bill Clinton named Walker Assistant Secretary of the Army for Installations, Energy and Environment and Walker held this office 1993-97.

In 1997, President Clinton nominated Walker as United States Under Secretary of the Army, and he subsequently held this office from November 13, 1997 through October 15, 1998. He was Acting United States Secretary of the Army from December 2, 1997 through July 2, 1998.

In 1998–1999, he was Deputy Director of the Federal Emergency Management Agency.

He then served as Acting Under Secretary of Veterans Affairs for Memorial Affairs, United States Department of Veterans Affairs from December 1999 until September 2000, at which point he was appointed as the first Under Secretary of Veterans Affairs for Memorial Affairs in the Department of Veterans Affairs, taking up his duties in September 2000.

In February 2001, Walker joined Plexus Scientific Corporation, serving as a senior vice president and later as chairman.

Walker has lectured at the Naval Postgraduate School's Center for Homeland Defense and Security.

Walker married Romy Pettersen.

Government offices
| Preceded by Joe R. Reeder | United States Under Secretary of the Army; November 13, 1997 – October 15, 1998 | Succeeded by Bernard D. Rostker |
| Preceded by Togo Dennis West Jr. | Acting United States Secretary of the Army; December 2, 1997 – July 1, 1998 | Succeeded by Louis Caldera |
