= Quarters 1 (Fort Myer) =

Historic house in Virginia, United States

- Quarters 1, Fort Myer
- U.S. National Register of Historic Places
- U.S. National Historic Landmark
- Virginia Landmarks Register
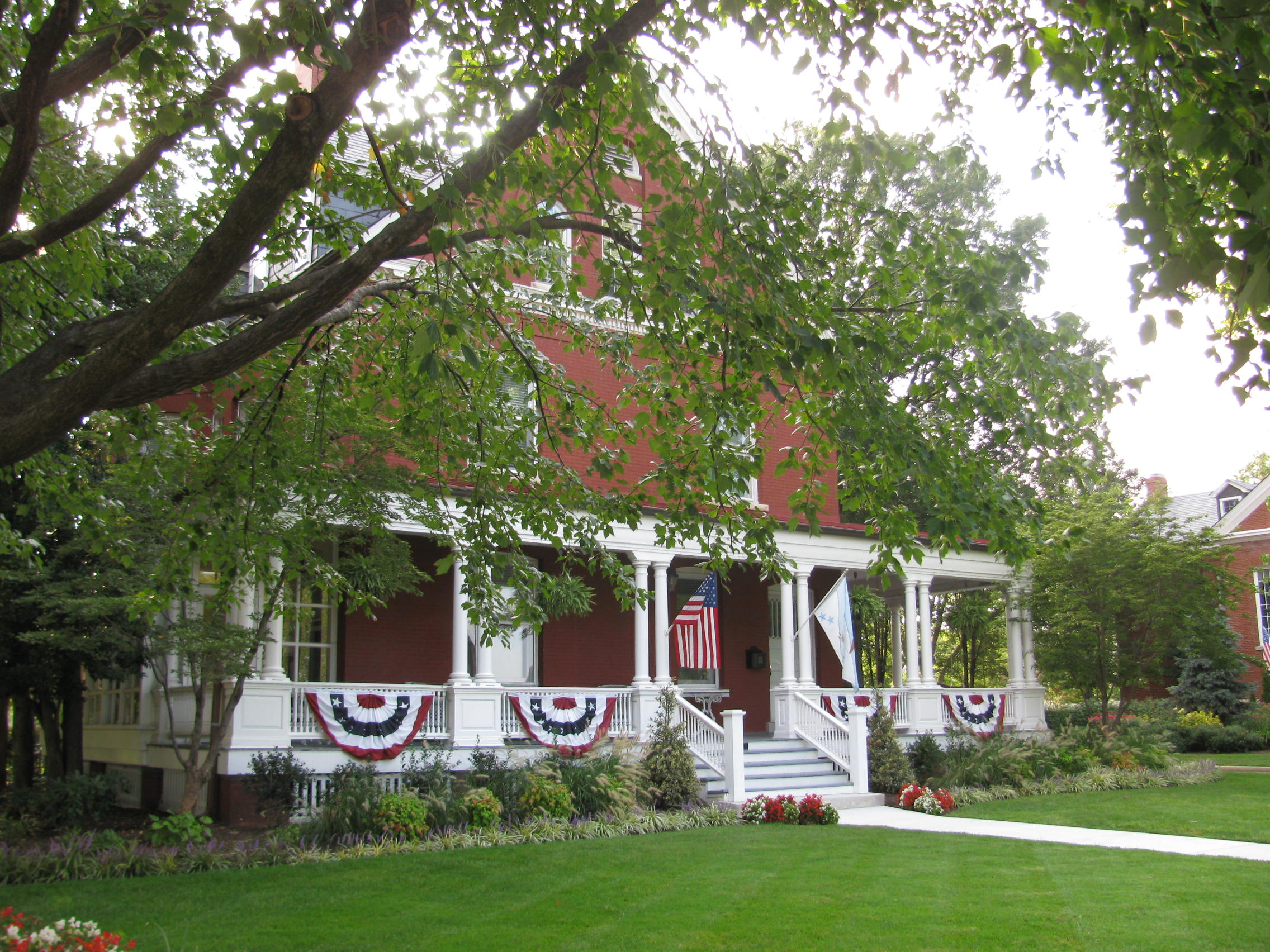
- Quarters 1, Fort Myer, September 2012

- Location within District of Columbia Location within Virginia Location within the United States
- Location: Grant Ave., Arlington, Virginia
- Coordinates: 38°52′58″N 77°4′53″W
- Built: 1899
- Architectural style: Victorian-style, red brick house
- NRHP reference No.: 72001382
- VLR No.: 000-0005

Significant dates
- Added to NRHP: November 28, 1972
- Designated NHL: November 28, 1972
- Designated VLR: June 19, 1973

Quarters 1 at Fort Myer is a historic house on the grounds of Joint Base Myer–Henderson Hall in Arlington, Virginia. Built in 1899, it has been the residence of Chiefs of Staff of the U.S. Army since 1910, notably including George C. Marshall, Dwight D. Eisenhower and Douglas MacArthur. It was declared a National Historic Landmark in 1972, and is a contributing element to the Fort Myer Historic District.

== Description and history ==
Quarters 1 is one of a series of large houses that flank the west side of Whipple Field, the former parade ground of Fort Myer, and are set on a rise with views to the Potomac River and Washington, DC to the east. It is a 2 1/2-story brick building, with a side gable roof and a projecting front cross gable. A single-story porch spans the front and beyond to the left, creating a porte-cochere. It is supported by paired round columns on pedestals, with a spindled balustrade between. The interior of the building has only seen modest alteration since its construction, and its exterior is also little changed beyond the addition of a sun porch on one side. The house has 21 rooms and more than 10,000 square feet (930 m^{2}) of living space.

The house was built in 1899, and has, since its occupation in 1908 by J. Franklin Bell, housed the Chief of Staff of the United States Army. Its most prominent resident was Dwight D. Eisenhower, who made his family residence here during his tenure as Chief of Staff, 1945–1948. Douglas MacArthur also lived here while he was Chief of Staff, 1930–1935.

== See also ==
- List of National Historic Landmarks in Virginia
- National Register of Historic Places listings in Arlington County, Virginia
