= United States Secretary of the Army =

Civilian head of the U.S. Department of the Army

- Seal of the U.S. Department of the Army

- Flag of the secretary

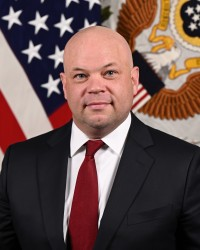
- Incumbent; Adam Telle; Acting since September 3, 2026
- United States Department of the Army; Office of the Secretary of the Army
- Style: Mr. Secretary
- Reports to: United States Secretary of Defense
- Appointer: The president; with Senate advice and consent
- Term length: No fixed term
- Precursor: Secretary of War
- Formation: September 18, 1947
- First holder: Kenneth Claiborne Royall
- Succession: 2nd in SecDef succession
- Deputy: Under Secretary of the Army; Chief of Staff of the Army
- Salary: Executive Schedule, Level II
- Website: Official website

The secretary of the Army (SA or SECARMY) is a senior civilian official within the United States Department of Defense, with statutory responsibility for all matters relating to the United States Army: manpower, personnel, reserve affairs, installations, environmental issues, weapons systems and equipment acquisition, communications and financial management.

The secretary of the Army is nominated by the president of the United States and confirmed by the United States Senate. They are a non-Cabinet-level official, subordinate to the secretary of defense. The position was created on September 18, 1947, replacing the secretary of war, when the Department of War was split into the Department of the Army and Department of the Air Force.

== Roles and responsibilities ==
The Army senior leadership consists of two civilians; the secretary of the Army and the under secretary of the Army—and two military officers of four-star rank—the chief of staff of the United States Army and the vice chief of staff.

The secretary of the Army (10 U.S.C. § 7013) is in effect the chief executive officer of the Department of the Army, and the chief of staff of the Army works directly for the secretary. The secretary presents and justifies Army policies, plans, programs, and budgets to the secretary of defense, other executive branch officials, and to the congressional Defense Committees. The secretary also communicates Army policies, plans, programs, capabilities, and accomplishments to the public. As necessary, the secretary convenes meetings with the senior leadership of the Army to debate issues, provide direction, and seek advice. The secretary is a member of the Defense Acquisition Board.

The secretary of the Army has several responsibilities under the Uniform Code of Military Justice, including the authority to convene general courts-martial.

== Office of the Secretary of the Army ==
The Office of the Secretary of the Army is composed of the under secretary of the Army, the assistant secretaries of the Army, the administrative assistant to the secretary, the general counsel of the Department of the Army, the inspector general of the Army, the chief of legislation, and the Army Reserve Forces Policy Committee. Other offices may be established by law or by the secretary of the Army. No more than 1,900 Army officers on the active-duty list may be assigned or detailed to permanent duty in the Office of the Secretary of the Army and on the Army staff.

- Under Secretary of the Army
  - Assistant Secretary of the Army (Acquisition, Logistics, and Technology)
  - Assistant Secretary of the Army (Civil Works)
  - Assistant Secretary of the Army (Financial Management and Comptroller)
  - Assistant Secretary of the Army (Installations, Energy and Environment)
  - Assistant Secretary of the Army (Manpower and Reserve Affairs)
  - General Counsel of the Army
  - Administrative Assistant to the Secretary of the Army
  - Inspector General of the Army

Each civilian has a military counterpart, as shown in the diagram below. Thus, for example, the Army G-1 has a defined responsibility to the assistant secretary of the Army (manpower and reserve affairs), the ASA (M&RA).

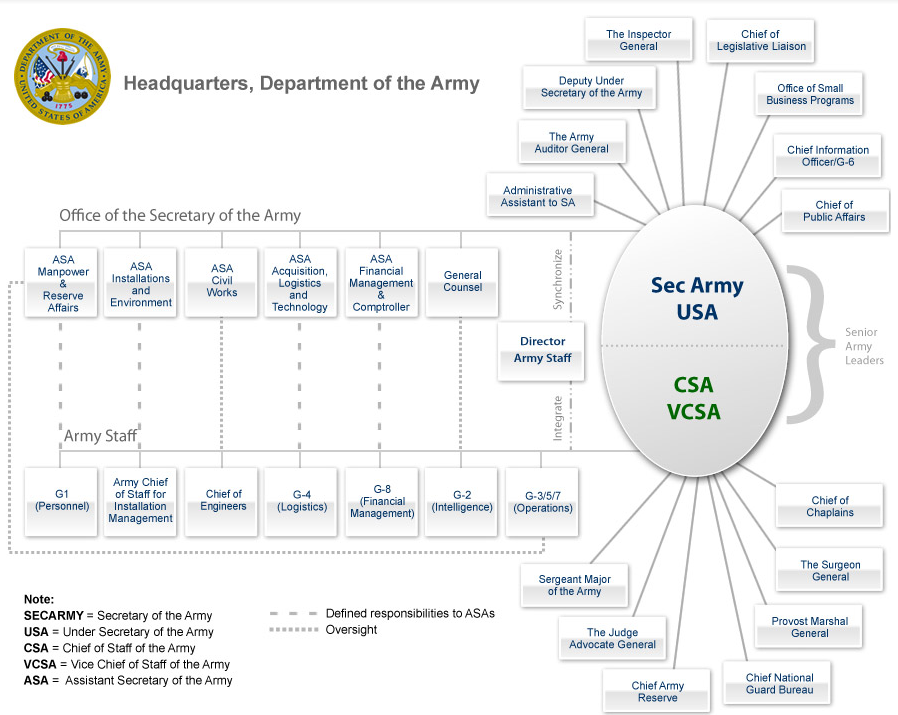
Chart showing the organization of the Office of the Secretary of Army and its relationship to the Army Staff.

== Chronological list of secretaries of the Army ==
Kenneth Claiborne Royall, the last secretary of war, became the first secretary of the Army when the National Defense Act of 1947 took effect. Gordon Gray was the last Army secretary to hold the Cabinet status, which was henceforth assigned to the secretary of defense.

Prior military service is not a requirement, but several have served in the United States armed forces. Secretary Stone (1989-1993) is the only holder to serve in the military outside of the United States.

Denotes acting capacity.

No.	Name	Start	End	President(s)
1	Kenneth Claiborne Royall	September 18, 1947	April 27, 1949	Harry S. Truman (1945–1953)
2	Gordon Gray	April 28, 1949	April 12, 1950	Harry S. Truman (1945–1953)
3	Frank Pace	April 12, 1950	January 20, 1953	Harry S. Truman (1945–1953)
–	Earl D. Johnson; Acting	January 20, 1953	February 4, 1953	Dwight D. Eisenhower (1953–1961)
4	Robert T. Stevens	February 4, 1953	July 21, 1955	Dwight D. Eisenhower (1953–1961)
5	Wilber M. Brucker	July 21, 1955	January 19, 1961	Dwight D. Eisenhower (1953–1961)
6	Elvis Jacob Stahr Jr.	January 24, 1961	June 30, 1962	John F. Kennedy (1961–1963)
7	Cyrus Vance	July 5, 1962	January 21, 1964	John F. Kennedy (1961–1963)
7	Cyrus Vance	July 5, 1962	January 21, 1964	Lyndon B. Johnson (1963–1969)
8	Stephen Ailes	January 28, 1964	July 1, 1965	Lyndon B. Johnson (1963–1969)
9	Stanley Resor	July 2, 1965	June 30, 1971	Lyndon B. Johnson (1963–1969)
9	Stanley Resor	July 2, 1965	June 30, 1971	Richard Nixon (1969–1974)
10	Robert Froehlke	July 1, 1971	May 14, 1973	Richard Nixon (1969–1974)
11	Bo Callaway	May 15, 1973	July 3, 1975	Richard Nixon (1969–1974)
11	Bo Callaway	May 15, 1973	July 3, 1975	Gerald Ford (1974–1977)
–	Norman R. Augustine; Acting	July 3, 1975	August 5, 1975	Gerald Ford (1974–1977)
12	Martin Hoffmann	August 5, 1975	January 20, 1977	Gerald Ford (1974–1977)
13	Clifford Alexander Jr.	February 14, 1977	January 20, 1981	Jimmy Carter (1977–1981)
–	Percy A. Pierre; Acting	January 21, 1981	January 29, 1981	Ronald Reagan (1981–1989)
14	John Marsh	January 30, 1981	August 14, 1989	Ronald Reagan (1981–1989)
14	John Marsh	January 30, 1981	August 14, 1989	George H. W. Bush (1989–1993)
15	Michael P. W. Stone	August 14, 1989	January 20, 1993	George H. W. Bush (1989–1993)
–	John W. Shannon; Acting	January 20, 1993	August 26, 1993	Bill Clinton (1993–2001)
–	Gordon R. Sullivan; Acting	August 28, 1993	November 21, 1993	Bill Clinton (1993–2001)
16	Togo D. West Jr.	November 22, 1993	May 4, 1997	Bill Clinton (1993–2001)
–	Robert M. Walker; Acting	December 2, 1997	July 1, 1998	Bill Clinton (1993–2001)
17	Louis Caldera	July 2, 1998	January 20, 2001	Bill Clinton (1993–2001)
–	Gregory R. Dahlberg; Acting	January 20, 2001	March 4, 2001	George W. Bush (2001–2009)
–	Joseph W. Westphal; Acting	March 5, 2001	May 31, 2001	George W. Bush (2001–2009)
18	Thomas E. White	May 31, 2001	May 9, 2003	George W. Bush (2001–2009)
–	Les Brownlee; Acting	May 10, 2003	November 18, 2004	George W. Bush (2001–2009)
19	Francis J. Harvey	November 19, 2004	March 9, 2007	George W. Bush (2001–2009)
20	Pete Geren	March 9, 2007	September 21, 2009	George W. Bush (2001–2009)
20	Pete Geren	March 9, 2007	September 21, 2009	Barack Obama (2009–2017)
21	John M. McHugh	September 21, 2009	November 1, 2015	Barack Obama (2009–2017)
–	Eric Fanning; Acting	November 3, 2015	January 11, 2016	Barack Obama (2009–2017)
–	Patrick Murphy; Acting	January 11, 2016	May 17, 2016	Barack Obama (2009–2017)
22	Eric Fanning	May 17, 2016	January 20, 2017	Barack Obama (2009–2017)
–	Robert Speer; Acting	January 20, 2017	August 2, 2017	Donald Trump (2017–2021)
–	Ryan D. McCarthy; Acting	August 2, 2017	November 20, 2017	Donald Trump (2017–2021)
23	Mark Esper	November 20, 2017; On leave: June 24, 2019 – July 15, 2019	July 23, 2019	Donald Trump (2017–2021)
–	Ryan D. McCarthy; Acting	June 24, 2019	July 15, 2019	Donald Trump (2017–2021)
24	Ryan D. McCarthy	July 23, 2019	September 30, 2019	Donald Trump (2017–2021)
24	Ryan D. McCarthy	September 30, 2019	January 20, 2021	Donald Trump (2017–2021)
–	John E. Whitley; Acting	January 20, 2021	May 28, 2021	Joe Biden (2021–2025)
25	Christine Wormuth	May 28, 2021	January 20, 2025	Joe Biden (2021–2025)
–	Mark Averill; Acting	January 20, 2025	February 25, 2025	Donald Trump (2025–present)
26	Daniel P. Driscoll	February 25, 2025	September 2, 2026	Donald Trump (2025–present)
–	Mike Obadal; Acting	September 3, 2026	September 3, 2026	Donald Trump (2025–present)
–	Adam Telle; Acting	September 3, 2026	present	Donald Trump (2025–present)
