= Robert Frederick Froehlke =

American businessman (1922–2016)

Robert Froehlke
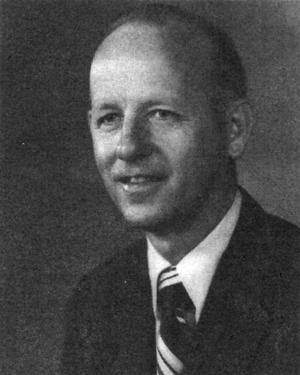

10th United States Secretary of the Army
- In office July 1, 1971 – May 14, 1973
- President: Richard Nixon
- Preceded by: Stanley R. Resor
- Succeeded by: Bo Callaway

Personal details
- Born: Robert Frederick Froehlke; October 15, 1922 Neenah, Wisconsin, U.S.
- Died: February 12, 2016 (aged 93) Scottsdale, Arizona, U.S.
- Party: Republican
- Spouse: Nancy Barnes (m. 1949)
- Children: 4
- Education: University of Wisconsin, Madison (BA, LLB)

Military service
- Branch/service: United States Army
- Years of service: 1943–1946
- Rank: Captain

Robert Frederick Froehlke (October 15, 1922 – February 12, 2016) was an American businessman, lawyer, and government official who served as Secretary of the Army from July 1971 until May 1973.

== Early life ==
Froehlke was born in Neenah, Wisconsin on October 15, 1922. He graduated from high school in Marshfield, and attended the University of Wisconsin from 1940 to 1943. He joined the United States Army in 1943 serving at an Infantry Replacement Center in Europe, attaining the rank of captain before being discharged in 1946.

== Education ==
After the war Froehlke attended the University of Wisconsin Law School. He graduated in 1949, was admitted to the bar, and practiced in Madison, Wisconsin with the firm of MacDonald and MacDonald. He also served as a member of the faculty at the University of Wisconsin Law School.

== Career ==
In 1951, Froehlke joined the legal department of the Sentry Insurance Company and he later became an executive with the company. A longtime friend of Melvin R. Laird, he managed Laird's congressional campaigns. When Laird became Secretary of Defense, Froehlke was appointed Assistant Secretary of Defense for Administration. He served until 1971 and during his tenure he was assigned responsibility for all Department of Defense intelligence resources and he was chairman of the Defense Investigative Review Council.

== Secretary of the Army ==
Froehlke became Secretary of the Army in July 1971 and served until May 1973. Under his administration, the Army redeployed its last troops from Vietnam and converted from the draft to an all-volunteer force. In addition, Army administration of the Ryukyu Islands was ended, and U.S. biological warfare facilities were closed in order to comply with international treaties and conventions.

As Secretary of the Army, Froehlke also was responsible for the action changing from dishonorable to honorable the discharges of the African-American soldiers who had been falsely accused of crimes in the 1906 Brownsville Affair.

== Later career ==
After resigning as Secretary of the Army, Froehlke returned to Sentry, serving as the company's president until 1976 when he left to become president of the Health Insurance Association of America. He then became president of the American Council of Life Insurers where he served until 1982, when he became chairman of the Equitable Life Assurance Society of the United States where he served until 1987 when he became president and chief executive officer of the IDS Mutual Fund Group.

After his 1993 retirement Froehlke resided in Minneapolis, where he was active in raising funds for civic and charitable causes. He and then University of Wisconsin, Madison chancellor Donna Shalala co-chaired that school's first major fund drive. He maintained a summer home in Waupaca, Wisconsin after relocating to Scottsdale, Arizona. Froehlke died in Scottsdale, Arizona on February 12, 2016. Froehlke was buried at Arlington National Cemetery.

Government offices
Preceded by Stanley R. Resor	United States Secretary of the Army; July 1971 – May 1973	Succeeded by Howard H. Callaway
