= Francis J. Harvey =

19th Secretary of the U.S. Army

Francis Harvey
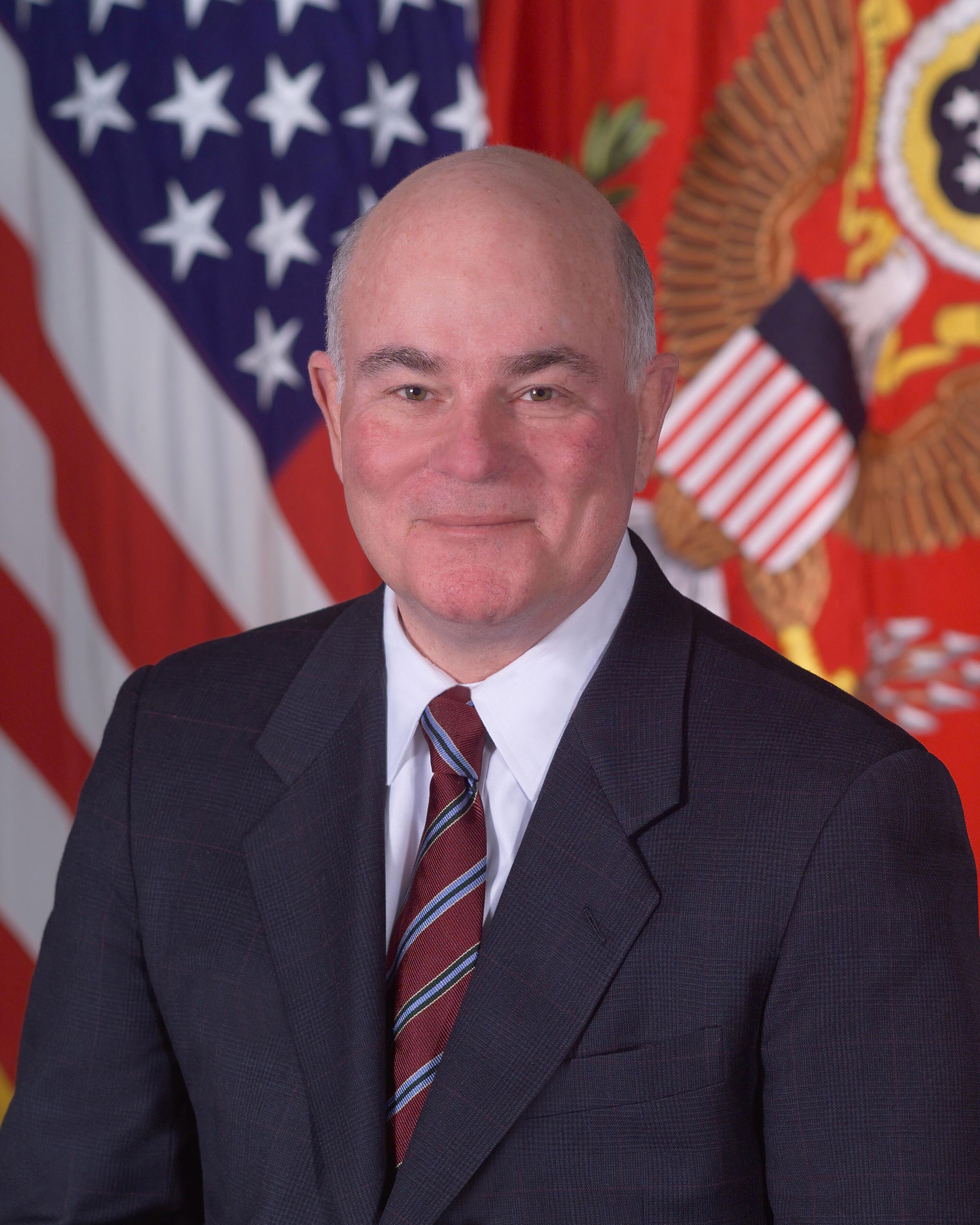
- Official portrait, 2004

19th United States Secretary of the Army
- In office November 19, 2004 – March 9, 2007
- President: George W. Bush
- Preceded by: Thomas E. White
- Succeeded by: Pete Geren

Personal details
- Born: Francis Joseph Harvey; July 8, 1943 (age 83) Latrobe, Pennsylvania, U.S.
- Party: Republican
- Education: University of Notre Dame (BS); University of Pennsylvania (MS, PhD)

Francis Joseph Harvey (born July 8, 1943) served as the 19th Secretary of the United States Army from November 19, 2004, to March 9, 2007.

== Education and family ==
Francis J. Harvey II was born and raised in Latrobe, Pennsylvania. He earned his doctorate in Metallurgy and Materials Science from the University of Pennsylvania and his Bachelor of Science at the University of Notre Dame in Metallurgical Engineering and Materials Science.

As of 2013, he and his wife of fifty-two years, Marie, have two boys. They also have five grandchildren.

== Career ==
The majority of Harvey's career was spent with corporations that provided products and services to the federal government, particularly the United States Department of Defense, and included a year of government service. He was involved in more than twenty major defense programs across the entire spectrum from undersea to outer space, including tanks, missiles, submarines, surface ships, aircraft and satellites. In addition, he was a member of the Army Science Board in the late 1990s, traveling to numerous U.S. Army installations, and participated in early studies that helped define the Future Combat System. Harvey also served for one year as a White House Fellow and assistant in the immediate office of the Secretary of Defense, Harold Brown, in the late 1970s.

Harvey held various professional, management and executive positions within the Westinghouse Corporation from 1969 to 1997, including President of the Electronics Systems Group, President of the Government and Environmental Services Company, and Chief Operating Officer of the multibillion-dollar Industries and Technology Group. Before his appointment as Army Secretary, he was also a Director and Vice Chairman of Duratek a portfolio company of the Carlyle Group specializing in treating radioactive, hazardous, and other wastes, he was also Director and Vice Chairman of another Carlyle Group portfolio company, The IT Group, which provided environmental services to both commercial and military customers. In addition, he was a member of the boards of several other corporations.

== Secretary of the Army ==
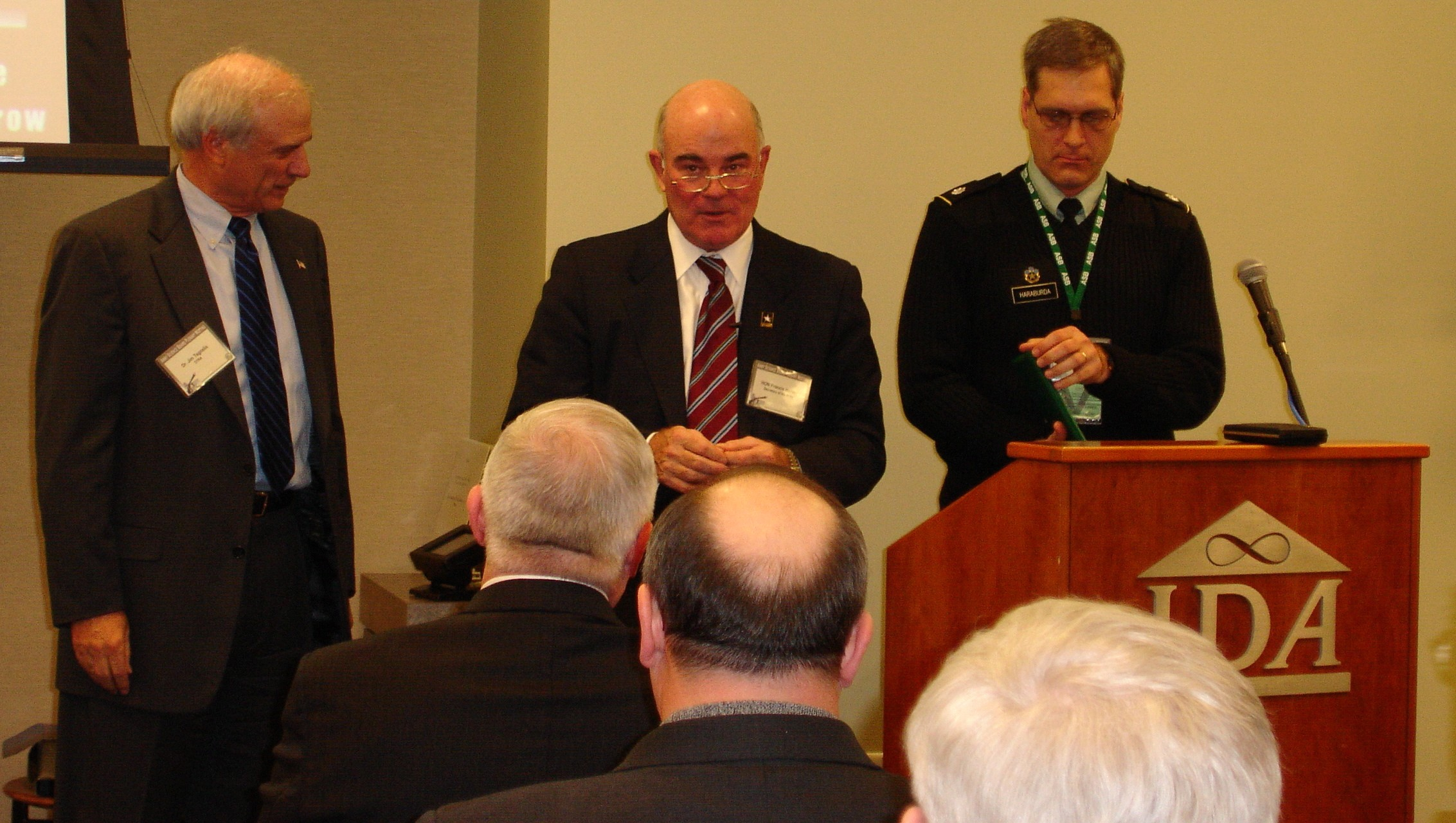
Secretary of the Army Dr. Francis J. Harvey (center), a former ASB member, awards the Decoration for Distinguished Civilian Service to departing ASB Chair Dr. James Tegnelia (left) as ASB Executive Secretary LTC Scott S. Haraburda (right) reads the citation, Feb. 24, 2005. (Photo courtesy of ASB Photo Archives.)

Harvey was nominated to be Secretary of the United States Army on September 15, 2004, by President George W. Bush. In this position, Harvey served as the senior civilian official within the Department of the Army. He was responsible for all matters relating to Army manpower, personnel, reserve affairs, installations, environmental issues, weapons systems and equipment acquisition, communications, and financial management, as well as an annual budget of $98.5 billion and over one million soldiers, personnel, and contractors.

== Walter Reed incident and resignation ==
In the wake of the Walter Reed Army Medical Center neglect scandal, Harvey announced his resignation on March 2, 2007, after being asked to do so by Secretary of Defense Robert Gates, with effect from March 9. In his memoirs, Gates cited Harvey's appointment of Army Surgeon-General Kevin C. Kiley as temporary hospital commander. This appointment "was greeted with dismay by many wounded warriors and their families" because many of these problems arose during Kiley's previous command of the hospital. Gates also cited Harvey's "unconscionable" attempt to blame the problems on "some NCOs who weren't doing their job".

Gates described Harvey as "a good man who had rendered distinguished service to the country. I fired him because once informed of the circumstances at Walter Reed, he did not take the problem serious enough".

Government offices
Preceded by Les Brownlee (Acting)	United States Secretary of the Army; November 19, 2004 – March 9, 2007	Succeeded by Pete Geren
