= Raymond A. Spicer =

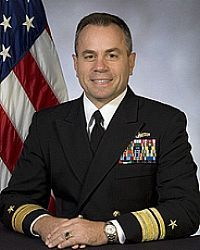
- Military career
- Allegiance: United States
- Branch: United States Navy
- Rank: Rear admiral

Raymond A. Spicer is chief executive officer of the United States Naval Institute and a retired rear admiral of the United States Navy.

A surface warfare officer, Spicer served as Deputy Assistant to the President and Director of the White House Military Office from March 2007 until January 2009. After he retired from the Navy, he directed Kestrel Programs for the Intelligence Systems Group at Boeing Defense, Space & Security. He joined IBM in 2015 and ultimately led IBM Federal’s Defense and Intelligence Technology Sales team.

In August 2023, Spicer was named CEO of the Naval Institute.

== Background ==
A native of Triangle, Virginia, Ray Spicer graduated from the U.S. Naval Academy in 1979 with a Bachelor of Science in Ocean Engineering.

His assignments at sea include Damage Control Assistant and Combat Information Center Officer aboard USS Robert E. Peary (FF-1073), Weapons Officer and Combat Systems Officer aboard USS Yorktown (CG-48), Executive Officer, USS Arleigh Burke (DDG-51), Commanding Officer, USS Mitscher (DDG-57), and Commander, Destroyer Squadron 7. During these operational tours, he completed eight deployments to the Western Pacific/Indian Ocean, Mediterranean Sea and Persian Gulf. His most recent sea duty was as the Commander, Carrier Strike Group 12 and Commander, Enterprise Strike Group. During that tour he deployed in 2006 to the Persian Gulf and Western Pacific, and the strike group participated in combat operations in Iraq and Afghanistan, supporting Operations Iraqi Freedom and Enduring Freedom.

Ashore, he served as operations briefer to the Secretary of the Navy and Chief of Naval Operations (CNO), Naval Aide to the Vice Chief of Naval Operations and Flag Lieutenant to the Commander, U.S. Pacific Command. Other shore duty included assignments as Officer in Charge of the Aegis Combat System Engineering Development Site in Moorestown, N.J.; Executive Assistant to the Deputy and Chief of Staff, U.S. Atlantic Fleet; Executive Assistant to the Commander, U.S. Pacific Fleet; Deputy and Chief of Staff for the Commander, Naval Surface Force, U.S. Pacific Fleet; and Deputy for Surface Ships (N76E), Deputy Director of Surface Warfare (N76B) and Assistant Deputy Chief of Naval Operations for Operations, Plans and Strategy (N3/N5B) on the staff of the Chief of Naval Operations.
