= Les Brownlee =

United States Army personnel (1939–2022)

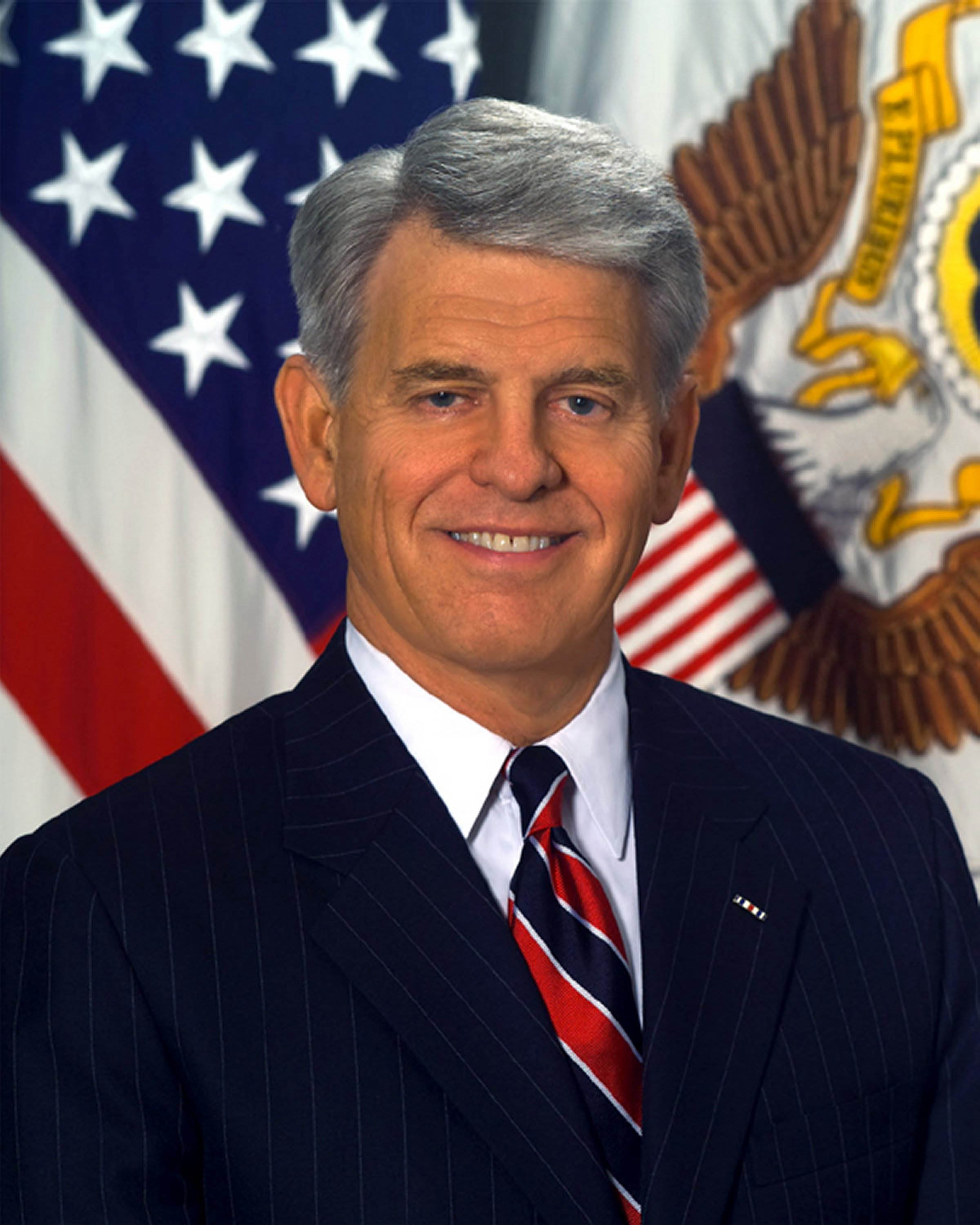

Acting United States Secretary of the Army
- In office May 10, 2003 – November 19, 2004
- President: George W. Bush
- Preceded by: Thomas E. White
- Succeeded by: Francis J. Harvey

27th United States Under Secretary of the Army
- In office November 10, 2001 – December 16, 2004
- President: George W. Bush
- Preceded by: Gregory R. Dahlberg
- Succeeded by: Pete Geren

Personal details
- Born: July 11, 1939 Pampa, Texas, U.S.
- Died: May 19, 2022 (aged 82) Annandale, Virginia, U.S.
- Resting place: Arlington National Cemetery
- Spouse: Nancy Long (divorced)
- Children: 2, including John
- Parents: Clyde L. Brownlee (father); Gladys A. Golightly (mother)
- Education: University of Wyoming (BA); University of Alabama (MBA)
- Awards: Silver Star with oak leaf cluster Bronze Star with 2 oak leaf clusters Purple Heart

Military service
- Branch/service: United States Army
- Years of service: 1962–1984
- Rank: Colonel
- Battles/wars: Vietnam War

Romer Leslie "Les" Brownlee (July 11, 1939 – May 19, 2022) served as the Under Secretary of the Army from November 2001 to December 2004 and as Acting United States Secretary of the Army from 17 November 2004 until his resignation effective 19 November 2004, staying at the Undersecretary's office.

== Military service ==
Brownlee was a retired Army colonel. He was commissioned in 1962 as a lieutenant in the infantry through the Army Reserve Officers' Training Corps program at the University of Wyoming. He is a distinguished honor graduate of the U.S. Army Ranger Course, an honor graduate of both the Infantry Officer Advanced Course and the Command and General Staff College, and a graduate of the Army's airborne course as well as the Army War College. Brownlee served two tours in Vietnam. During the last two and a half years of a four-and-a-half-year tour in the Pentagon, before retiring in 1984, he was military executive to Under Secretary of the Army James Ambrose.

His military decorations include the Silver Star with oak leaf cluster, the Bronze Star with two oak leaf clusters, and the Purple Heart. He holds a master's degree in business administration from the University of Alabama.

== Career ==
Brownlee became the 27th Under Secretary of the Army on 14 November 2001, following his nomination by President George W. Bush and confirmation by the United States Senate. From 10 May 2003 until 19 November 2004, he served as the Acting Secretary of the Army. As Under Secretary, Brownlee assisted the secretary in fulfilling statutory responsibilities for recruiting, organizing, supplying, equipping, training and mobilizing the United States Army and managing its $98.5 billion annual budget and more than 1.3 million active duty, Army National Guard, Army Reserve and civilian personnel.

Brownlee served on the Republican staff of the Senate Armed Services Committee beginning in January 1987, under both Senator Strom Thurmond and Senator John Warner. In March 1996, Brownlee was designated staff director of the Senate Committee on Armed Services by then chairman, Sen. Thurmond. In January 1999, he was designated staff director for then chairman, Sen. Warner, serving until November 2001 when he was confirmed as the Under Secretary of the Army.

From 1987 to 1996, he was a professional staff member responsible for Army and Marine Corps programs, special operations forces and drug interdiction policy and support. In addition, as deputy staff director, he was deeply involved in policies and programs relating to ballistic missile defense, strategic deterrence and naval strategy, shipbuilding and weapons programs.

== Family ==
His son, John L. Brownlee is a former U.S. Attorney and prior candidate for the Republican nomination for Virginia Attorney General in 2009.

Government offices
Preceded by Gregory R. Dahlberg	United States Under Secretary of the Army; November 2001 – December 2004	Succeeded by Pete Geren
Preceded by Thomas E. White	Acting United States Secretary of the Army; May 2003–November 2004	Succeeded by Francis J. Harvey
