= Thomas E. White =

American businessman and former United States Army officer

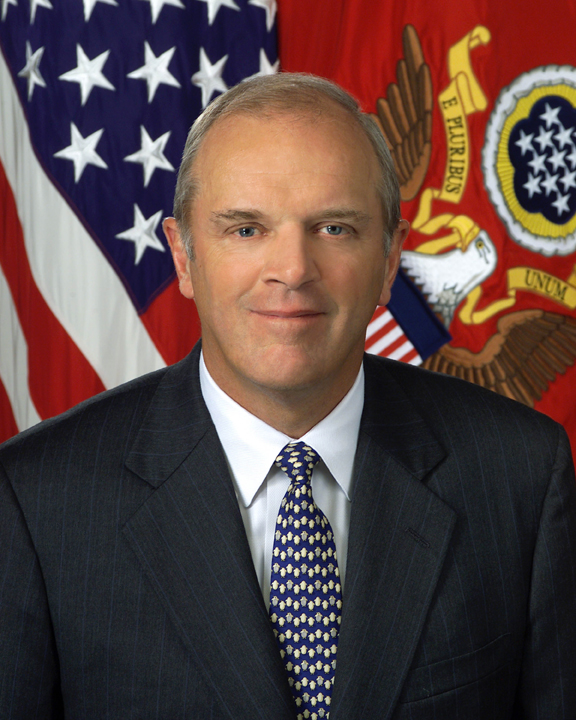
- Official portrait, 2001

18th United States Secretary of the Army
- In office May 31, 2001 – November 17, 2004
- President: George W. Bush
- Preceded by: Louis Caldera
- Succeeded by: Les Brownlee (acting); Francis J. Harvey

Personal details
- Born: Thomas Eugene White Jr. December 14, 1943 Detroit, Michigan, U.S.
- Died: December 10, 2024 (aged 80)
- Education: United States Military Academy (BS); Naval Postgraduate School (MS)

Military service
- Branch/service: United States Army
- Years of service: 1967–1990
- Rank: Brigadier General
- Unit: 11th Armored Cavalry Regiment; 6th Cavalry Regiment; 8th Cavalry Regiment
- Commands: 11th Armored Cavalry Regiment
- Battles/wars: Vietnam War
- Awards: Defense Distinguished Service Medal; Silver Star; Legion of Merit (2); Bronze Star (3); Distinguished Flying Cross; Meritorious Service Medal; Army Commendation Medal (2); Army Achievement Medal

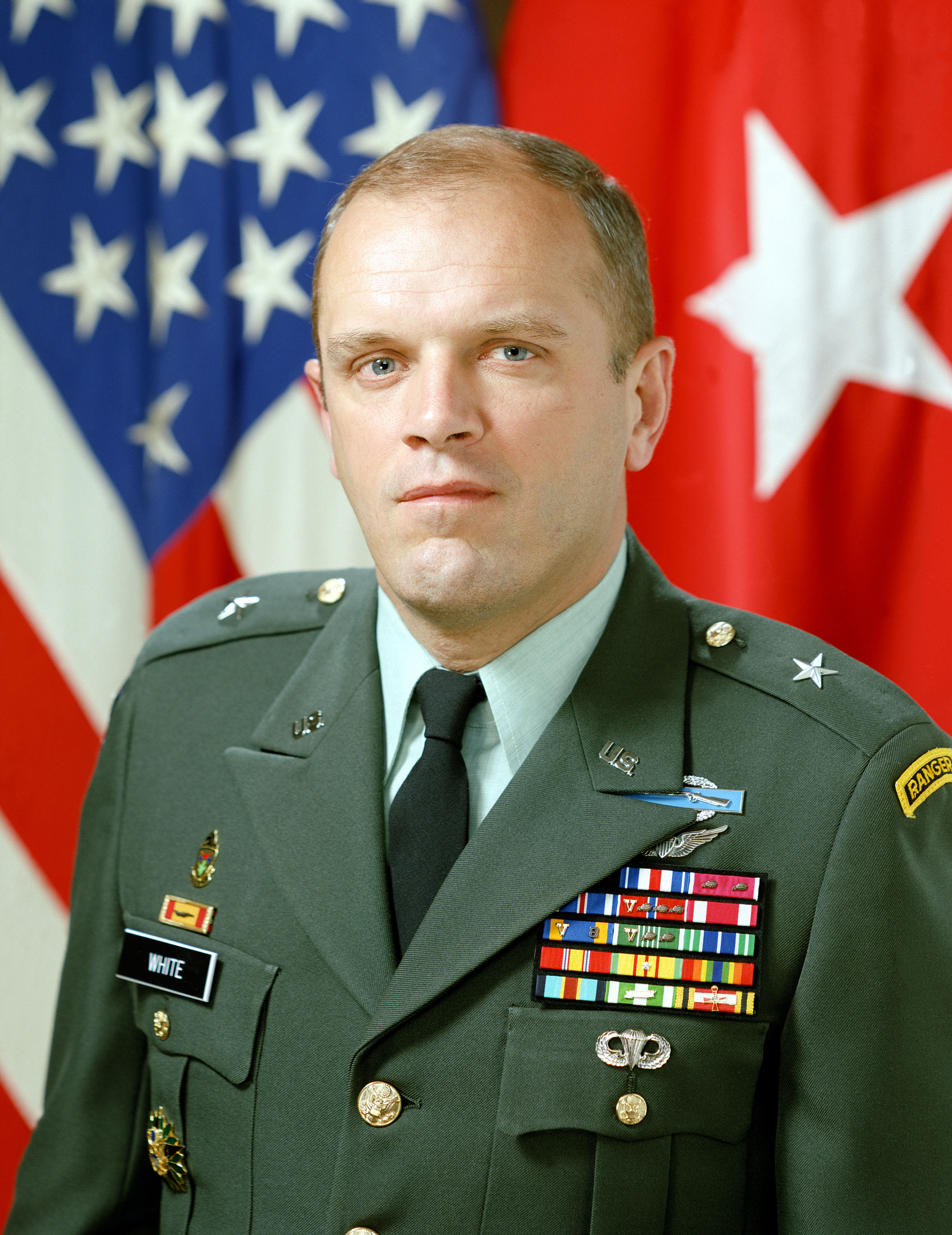
White as brigadier general, 1989

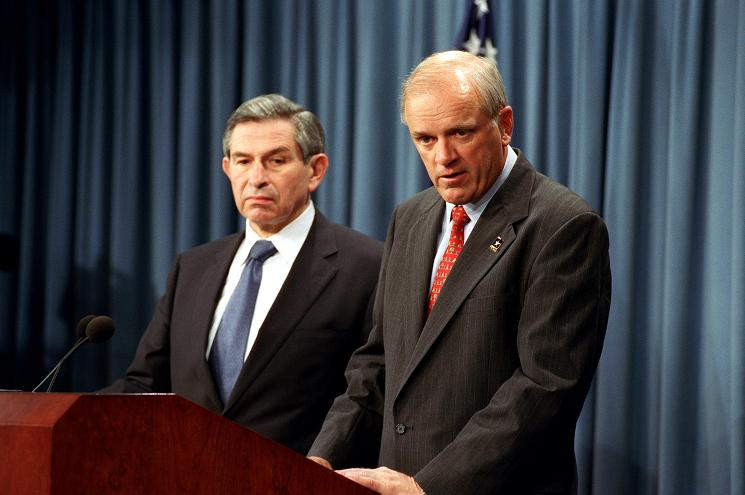
Secretary Thomas E. White and Deputy Secretary of Defense Paul Wolfowitz explain Crusader.

Thomas Eugene White Jr. (December 14, 1943 - December 10, 2024) was an American businessman and former United States Army officer who served as a senior executive for a subsidiary of the now collapsed Enron and as the United States Secretary of the Army from May 31, 2001 until November 17, 2004.

== Military career and education ==
White was born in Detroit, Michigan. In 1963 White graduated from Cass Technical High School in Detroit. He was a part of the JROTC program at Cass Tech, which is highly ranked every year in military competition. In 1967, White graduated from the United States Military Academy at West Point with a Bachelor of Science degree and was commissioned in the United States Army. In 1974, he received a Master of Science degree in operations research from the Naval Postgraduate School, Monterey, California. In 1984, he attended the United States Army War College, Carlisle, Pennsylvania.

During a long military career, that included two tours of duty in Vietnam, he served in a variety of capacities including:

- Commander, 1st Squadron, 11th Armored Cavalry Regiment;
- Commander, 11th Armored Cavalry Regiment, V Corps;
- Director, Armor/Anti-Armor Special Task Force.

In 1989, White was appointed executive assistant to the then chairman of the Joint Chiefs of Staff General Colin Powell, where he was described in The Washington Post by a mutual friend as Powell's "alter ego" in "a job that requires tremendous political sophistication." In July 1990 White retired from the Army with the rank of Brigadier General.

== Business career ==
In 1990 White entered the private sector as Vice-Chairman of Enron Energy Services (E.E.S.), a subsidiary of the Enron Corporation responsible for providing energy outsource solutions. According to his original Department of Defense biography White was responsible for the delivery component of energy management services, which included:

- Commodity management
- Purchasing, maintaining and operating energy assets
- Developing and implementing energy information services
- Capital management
- Facilities management

He was responsible for the Enron Engineering and Construction Company, which managed an extensive construction portfolio with domestic and international projects. White also served as a member of Enron's Executive Committee and was chairman and chief executive officer for Enron Operations Corporation.

== Appointment as Secretary of the Army ==
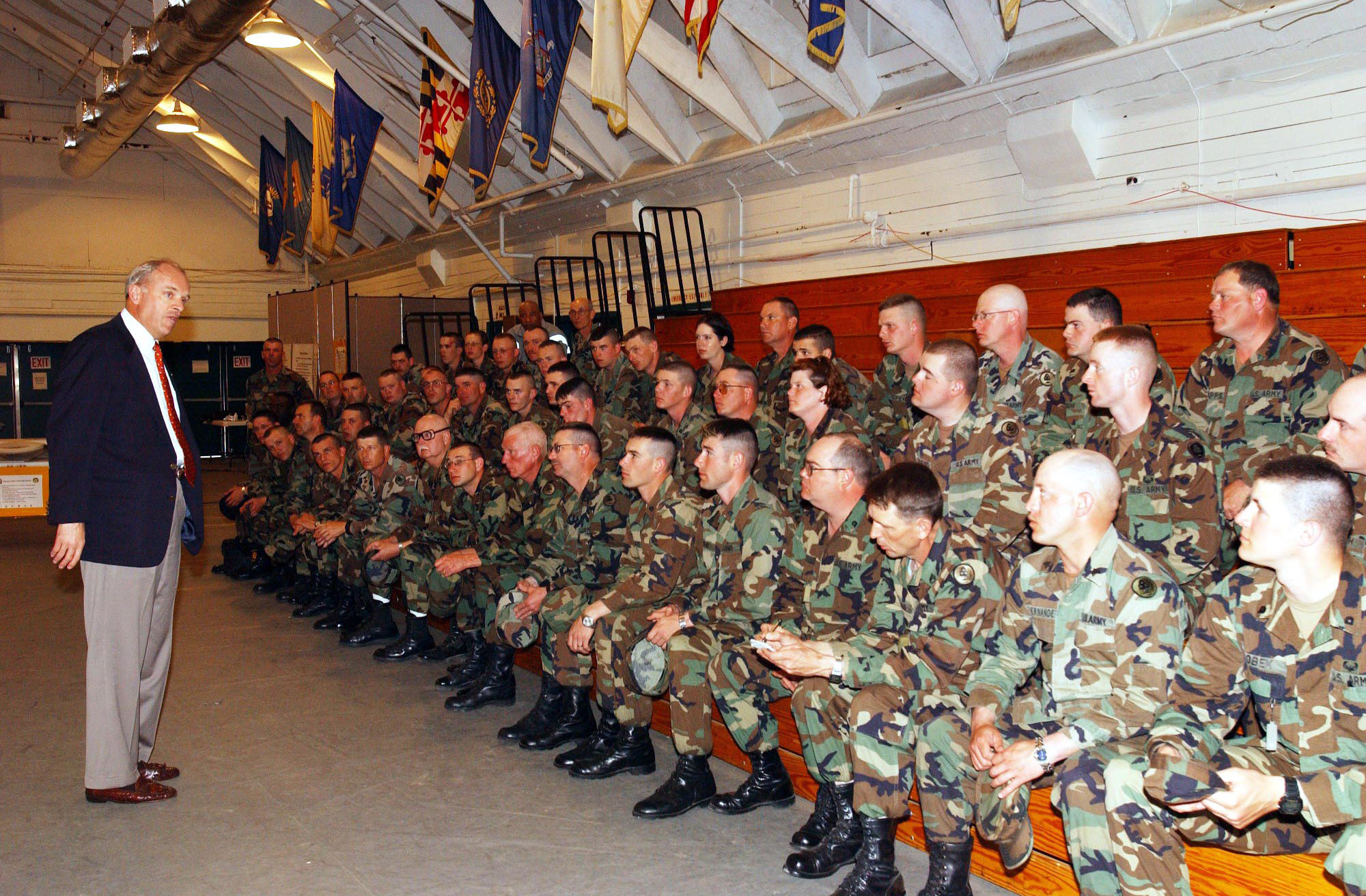
Secretary Thomas E. White visits Fort Campbell, KY.

White was a controversial choice for Government service despite his long military service due to his most recent position as an executive with the Enron Corporation. U.S. Secretary of Defense Donald Rumsfeld however had decided to make corporate experience one of the key requirements in his appointees.

White was sworn in on May 31, 2001 as 18th Secretary of the Army and was responsible for all matters relating to Army manpower, personnel, reserve affairs, installations, environmental issues, weapons systems and equipment acquisition, communications, and financial management. He led a work-force of over one million active duty, National Guard and Army Reserve soldiers and 270,000 civilian employees, he had stewardship over 15 million acres (60,000 km^{2}) of land and an annual budget of nearly $70 billion.

White was immediately embroiled in controversy regarding his previous employment with Enron and what he may have known about some of Enron's questionable business practices. His retention of a sizable amount of Enron stock fueled the perception of a conflict interest.

In 2002, White became involved with a dispute with Donald Rumsfeld over the proposed cancellation of the Army's Crusader artillery project. White supported the Army view that the Crusader was vital to the Army's future and circulated "talking points" for congressional discussions extolling its value. However, Rumsfeld decided it was not suited for wars of the future and eventually canceled the program.

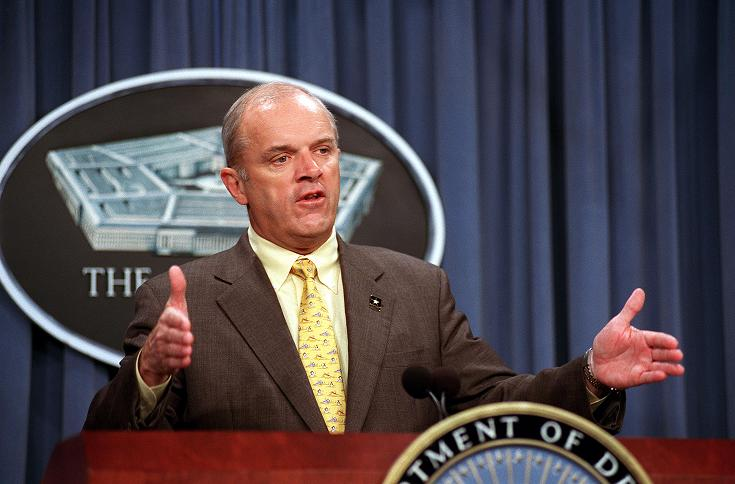
Secretary Thomas E. White at press conference

In 2003, White refused to publicly rebuke General Eric Shinseki for his statement to the Senate Armed services committee that it would take "something in the order of several hundred thousand soldiers" to occupy Iraq after invasion. This, combined with White's actions on the Crusader, disagreements with Rumsfeld on the Stryker project, and his distracting association with Enron including the selling of restricted Enron stock through "private investments" (derivatives), prompted Rumsfeld to demand White's resignation. White resigned on April 25, 2003.

== Controversy ==
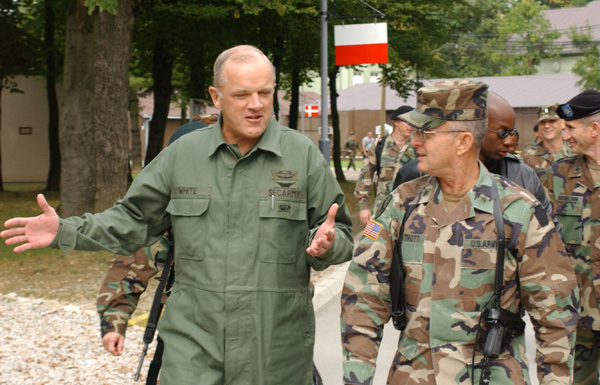
White touring Camp Eagle, Bosnia-Herzegovina, 2002

While serving as Vice Chairman of Enron Energy Services White had actively pursued military contracts for the company and in 1999 had secured a prototype deal at Fort Hamilton for privatizing the power supply of army bases. Enron had been the only bidder for this deal after White had controversially used his government and military contacts to secure key concessions.

In his first speech just "two weeks after he became secretary of the Army, White vowed to speed up the awarding of such contracts"; as the Enron Ft. Hamilton contract, despite the fact that he still held a considerable interest in Enron. A Pentagon spokeswoman responded to suggestions of a possible conflict of interests by saying that "Defense Secretary Donald Rumsfeld sees no conflict and has complete confidence in the Army secretary".

The Washington Post reported that in late October 2001, White made numerous phone calls to Enron executives including Vice President Jude Rolfes, former CEO Jeff Skilling and President current CEO Ken Lay. Shortly after the calls were made, White unloaded 200,000 Enron shares for $12 million. The L.A. Times reported that White had brief conversations with Rumsfeld in November and Powell in December, the focus of which were "a concern on their part for the impact that the bankruptcy of Enron may have had on my personal well-being. My response in both cases was that I had suffered significant personal losses but that I would persevere."

The New York Times reported that in late January 2002, Rep. Henry Waxman requested a meeting with White regarding the military contracts and the irregularities with the accounting at E.E.S. stating "you are in a unique position because you are the person in government who has the most intimate knowledge of Enron". Furthermore, The Washington Post reported that at this time White still held interests in Enron, including a claim on 50,000 stock options and an annuity paid by the company, despite having promised to divest himself at his confirmation hearing 8 months earlier. This earned him a rebuke from Sens. Carl Levin (D-Mich.) and John Warner (R-Va.) of the Senate Armed Services Committee. He was also accused in The Washington Post of Misuse of Government Property, by allegedly using military jets for personal trips for himself and his wife. In July, following news reports of the company's involvement in the 2000–2001 California electricity crisis, White denied his involvement under oath before the Senate Commerce Committee.

Government offices
Preceded by Joseph W. Westphal (acting)	United States Secretary of the Army; May 2001 – May 2003	Succeeded by Les Brownlee (acting)
