= Leisure World, Maryland =

- Census-designated place
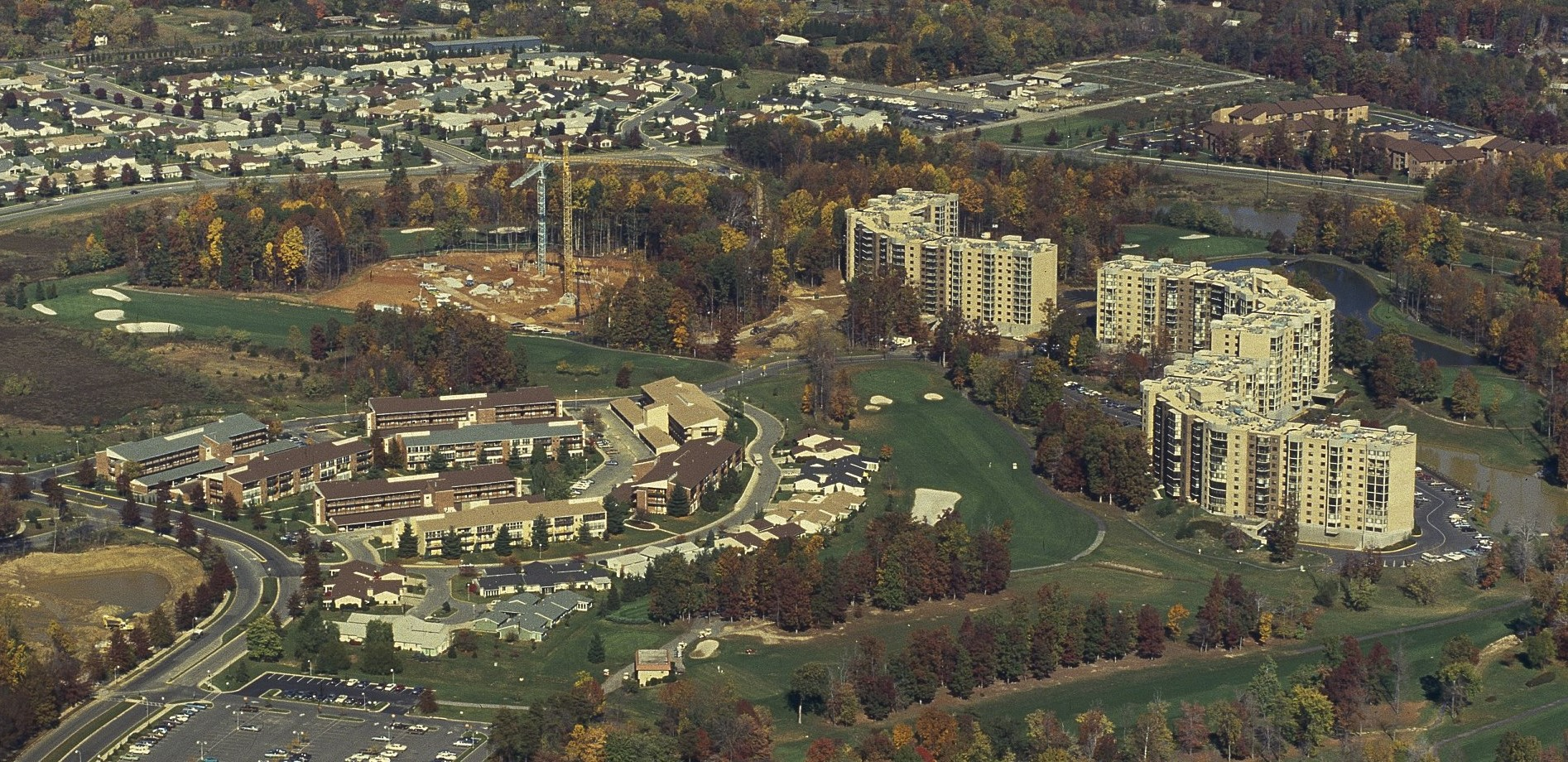
- Aerial view of apartment buildings at Leisure World, mid-80s

- Flag Logo

- Coordinates: 39°06′08″N 77°04′08″W
- Country: United States
- State: Maryland
- County: Montgomery

Area
  - Total: 1.14 sq mi (2.94 km^{2})
  - Land: 1.13 sq mi (2.92 km^{2})
  - Water: 0.0077 sq mi (0.02 km^{2})
- Elevation: 423 ft (129 m)

Population (2020)
  - Total: 9,215
  - Density: 8,169/sq mi (3,153.9/km^{2})
- Time zone: UTC−5 (Eastern (EST))
  - Summer (DST): UTC−4 (EDT)
- ZIP codes: 20906
- Area codes: 301, 240
- FIPS code: 24-68675
- GNIS feature ID: 2389782
- Website: www.lwmc.com

Leisure World is a census-designated place and unincorporated area in Montgomery County, Maryland, United States. It is an age-restricted, gated development primarily inhabited by retirees. As of the 2020 census it had a population of 9,215. Leisure World was known as the Rossmoor census-designated place for the 2000 census.

== History ==
=== Development ===
In 1963, developer Ross Cortese applied for a zoning amendment in order to build a 1,000-acre community of semi-detached homes, townhouses, and apartment buildings south of Norbeck, Maryland. Cortese's company had acquired the option to buy the 1,000 acres of land, formerly known as the Nash tract, for $5,000,000, and Cortese expected it would cost another $750,000 to build the development according to the plans. The development would be restricted to residents who are at least 52 years old. Cortese planned to build clubhouses, a swimming pool, riding stables, an auditorium, a shopping center, medical facilities, a hotel for guests, an 18-hole golf course, and an 8-acre lake at the site. Sixty-five percent of the area would be undeveloped green space. The entire site would be surrounded by a wall, and full-time security guards would restrict access. According to the plans, co-op homes would be available for between $15,000 and $18,000, payable with a $1,000 down payment and monthly payments thereafter of between $140 and $180. Cortese had already built Rossmoor Leisure World at Seal Beach, California, in 1961, and he was then building Leisure World Laguna Hills in Laguna Hills, California, and another Leisure World in Walnut Creek, California.

The Montgomery County Council approved the zoning amendment by a vote of 3 to 1, with 3 abstentions. The one dissenting council member was Kathryn E. Diggs, who said she was skeptical that the development would be economically successful. Local citizen groups opposed building the development because they preferred the area to remain zoned for low-density development. The council had been planning to extend Connecticut Avenue through the area, but the Council put that action on hold because of the proposed development. Within a few months, Washington Suburban Sanitary Commission approved 28,000 feet of water and sewer lines for the development. The architecture firm of Collins & Kronstadt designed the housing units and the community buildings. Thurman D. Donavan designed the landscaping, which received an award by the industrial landscaping committee of the American Association of Nurserymen in November 1966. A large rotating globe was installed at the front gate.

Leisure World's sales office and model homes opened in August 1965; Loy Sigmon was the interior designer of the original seven model homes. J. Robert Conybeare served as general sales manager, and Angus T. Johnson was named the first administrator of the community.

The community was marketed to people who wanted to stay active while living there. While residence was restricted to people at least 52 years old (later reduced to 50 years old), proof of age was not originally required. Leisure World allowed people of all races to live in the community.

The community facilities were held in trust by the Foundation of Leisure World, a 501(c)(3) nonprofit organization, with former Under Secretary of the Navy Kenneth E. BeLieu as its first president. Homes were sold as co-ops, with prices starting at $15,000 and ongoing monthly maintenance payments of at least $85. Within six months, 400 home units had been pre-sold.

=== Shopping center ===
Plans for Leisure World's 100,000-square-foot shopping center were announced in October 1965. The plan was to sell 9,200 residential units within five years, enough space for approximately 15,640 people to live. Commercial leases were signed with Safeway, Peoples Drug Stores, Hot Shoppes cafeteria-style restaurant, and Maryland National Bank for space at the adjoining shopping center. The Interfaith Meeting House broke ground on October 22, 1965, with plans for a capacity for 500 people.

=== First residents ===
The first residents moved in on August 15, 1965. The community held a welcoming ceremony at the eighteenth hole of the golf course for the first residents. The first residents lived in twelve units on Gleneagles Drive. The first nine holes of the golf course opened June 1, 1966.

=== Slowdown on sales ===
In early 1967, Leisure World changed its marketing focus from that of a retirement community to that of a country club community for adults. Sales of units at Leisure World were suspended in September 1967 after a tight mortgage market significantly increased prices and lower than expected interest. Sales resumed on January 1, 1968. Sales were still slow, the developer's carrying costs on the remaining vacant land were large, and the U.S. state of Maryland had prohibited further development in the area until a new sewage treatment plant was built, all of which temporarily prevented additional construction. The developer said it would need to develop the remaining vacant land eventually, as the additional residents were needed in order to support the common facilities by way of monthly maintenance fees. In October 1974, Leisure World canceled the sales contracts for 480 semidetached homes and low-rise apartments because inflation had increased construction costs and it was no longer certain when the units would actually be built. Five months later, Leisure World offered the units for sale again at increased prices. In September 1976, the developer agreed to build the 300,000-gallon wastewater treatment plant. Almost one year later, the developer sued the state of Maryland, saying Washington Suburban Sanitary Commission failed to complete a 1965 contract to provide water and sewer connections to the area because the Maryland Department of Health and Mental Hygiene had ordered a halt to sewer connections in 1973. The developer also said it was strong-armed into building a sewage treatment facility by the Montgomery County government in order to avoid significant financial losses.

John E. Byrne Jr., manager of Leisure World, agreed to buy Leisure World from Ross Cortese in August 1968, but the sale was not completed. In April 1969, Crane Company agreed to buy Leisure World from Cortese. That agreement was broken four months later by mutual consent. In February 1970, Zero Manufacturing Company agreed to buy Rossmoor Corporation, the developer of Leisure World.

=== Fires ===
On March 1, 1968, there was a fire in a model two-story townhouse on Gleneagles Drive at Leisure World. Approximately 100 firefighters reported to the fire. The fire caused damage to four townhouses, estimated at $100,000. There was one injury; Chief Sidney Bailey of Sandy Spring Fire Department was treated for burns to the eye. A fire killed a woman in her home on Chiswick Court in October 1969. In May 1976, there was a fire in a three-story apartment building on Glen Eagle Drive. One-hundred firefighters reported to the fire. The only injury was a firefighter with a broken thumb. The fire destroyed twelve homes, and those twelve families had to move in with friends and families. In November 2020, an early morning fire left one person dead and displaced 40 other residents.

=== Changes in plans ===
Leisure World asked Montgomery County for approval to reduce its resident age minimum from 50 to 40 years old, but Montgomery County disapproved the change. On August 12, 1968, Leisure World asked Montgomery County Planning Board to remove the age limit altogether, but the Montgomery County Planning Board disapproved the change. On August 23, 1968, Leisure World made another request to drop the age limit for almost half the land, and Montgomery County Planning Board disapproved the request again. Montgomery County Planning Board had agreed to change the land's zoning from low density to higher density on the condition that all residents would be of age 50 or older and, in a vote of 4–1, Montgomery County Planning Board would not let Leisure World out of its agreement. On December 31, 1968, the Montgomery County Council voted to allow the change to the age limit for about 40 percent of the land, despite the objections by the Montgomery County Planning Board. A part of the negotiation, Leisure World agreed to develop the unrestricted portion of land as a separate development. In February 1971, three families living nearby filed a lawsuit to prevent construction of about 2,500 homes. The plaintiffs contended that the population of the 2,500 homes without age restrictions would be much larger than originally intended because many of the units would be occupied by families. The plaintiffs said that the additional residents would cause an increase in public service costs and a decrease in their property values.

== Geography ==
As an unincorporated area, Leisure World's boundaries are not officially defined, but are unofficially defined by a fence around the community.

Leisure World is, however, recognized by the United States Census Bureau and by the United States Geological Survey as a census-designated place.

According to the United States Census Bureau, the place has a total area of 1.1 square miles (2.8 km^{2}), all land.

== Demographics ==
Historical population
Census	Pop.	Note	%±
2010	8,749		—
2020	9,215		5.3%
source: 2010–2020

=== 2020 census ===
As of the 2020 census, Leisure World had a population of 9,215. The median age was 74.5 years. 5.1% of residents were under the age of 18 and 73.7% of residents were 65 years of age or older. For every 100 females there were 55.7 males, and for every 100 females age 18 and over there were 54.0 males age 18 and over.

100.0% of residents lived in urban areas, while 0.0% lived in rural areas.

There were 6,032 households in Leisure World, of which 4.3% had children under the age of 18 living in them. Of all households, 27.0% were married-couple households, 14.9% were households with a male householder and no spouse or partner present, and 56.4% were households with a female householder and no spouse or partner present. About 63.1% of all households were made up of individuals and 56.1% had someone living alone who was 65 years of age or older.

There were 6,502 housing units, of which 7.2% were vacant. The homeowner vacancy rate was 1.8% and the rental vacancy rate was 5.3%.

Racial composition as of the 2020 census
Race	Number	Percent
White	5,627	61.1%
Black or African American	1,954	21.2%
American Indian and Alaska Native	25	0.3%
Asian	708	7.7%
Native Hawaiian and Other Pacific Islander	4	0.0%
Some other race	345	3.7%
Two or more races	552	6.0%
Hispanic or Latino (of any race)	792	8.6%

=== Demographic estimates ===
Of the population between 2011 and 2015, 23% speak a language other than English at home.

As of 2015, of people age 25 or older, 92% had graduated from high school, and 46% had earned a bachelor's degree.

Of residents age 16 or older, 26% were working in the civilian labor force. Their mean travel time to work was 33 minutes. The median household income was $53,175. Of the population, 7% were below the poverty level.

=== 2010 census ===
As of the census of 2010, there were 8,749 people living in 5,803 households in the area. The average household size was 1.57. The population density was 7,997 people per square mile.

The racial makeup of the area was 75% White, 17% African American, 0.1% Native American, 4% Asian, 0.1% Pacific Islander, and 2% from two or more races. Hispanic or Latino people of any race were 7% of the population. 71% were white and not Hispanic or Latino.

The population included 1,444 veterans. Foreign-born persons consisted of 23% of the population.

In the area the population was spread out, with 4.5% under the age of 18, 22.6% from age 18 to 64, and 72.9% who were 65 years of age or older. Of the population, 62.5% were female.

=== 2000 census ===
As of the census of 2000, there were 7,569 people, 4,857 households, and 1,792 families residing in the area. The population density was 6,918.0 inhabitants per square mile (2,671.1/km^{2}). There were 5,347 housing units at an average density of 4,887.1 per square mile (1,886.9/km^{2}). The racial makeup of the area was 83.15% White, 11.57% African American, 0.04% Native American, 1.74% Asian, 0.01% Pacific Islander, 1.81% from other races, and 1.66% from two or more races. Hispanic or Latino people of any race were 4.43% of the population.

There were 4,857 households, out of which 3.5% had children under the age of 18 living with them, 32.4% were married couples living together, 3.8% had a female householder with no husband present, and 63.1% were non-families. 61.2% of all households were made up of individuals, and 56.8% had someone living alone who was 65 years of age or older. The average household size was 1.53 and the average family size was 2.33.

In the area the population was spread out, with 5.2% under the age of 18, 1.8% from 18 to 24, 6.8% from 25 to 44, 9.7% from 45 to 64, and 76.5% who were 65 years of age or older. The median age was 77 years. For every 100 females, there were 52.5 males. For every 100 females age 18 and over, there were 50.9 males.

The median income for a household in the area was $45,945, and the median income for a family was $63,773. Males had a median income of $54,408 versus $36,038 for females. The per capita income for the area was $37,761. About 1.0% of families and 4.1% of the population were below the poverty line, including none of those under age 18 and 4.1% of those age 65 or over.
