= Donald Erwin Wilson =

United States Navy admiral (1932–2002)

- Born: August 12, 1932; Holway, Wisconsin, U.S.
- Died: February 3, 2002 (aged 69); Woodburn, Fairfax County, Virginia, U.S.
- Burial place: Arlington National Cemetery
- Military career
- Allegiance: United States
- Branch: United States Navy
- Service years: 1955–1987
- Rank: Rear Admiral
- Awards: Navy Distinguished Service Medal; Bronze Star Medal; Meritorious Service Medal; Vietnam Gallantry Cross

Donald Erwin Wilson (August 12, 1932 – February 3, 2002) was a rear admiral in the United States Navy.

== Biography ==
Wilson was born in Holway, Wisconsin, on August 12, 1932. He graduated with a M.S. in Management from San Diego State University in 1955, having earned a B.S. in Accounting the previous year. Wilson married Leanna Draper and they had three children.

He died of cancer on February 3, 2002, at Inova Fairfax Hospital in Woodburn, Fairfax County, Virginia, and is buried at Arlington National Cemetery.

== Career ==
After joining the Navy, Wilson was assigned to Miramar Naval Air Station. During the Vietnam War, he was stationed in Saigon. Later he would serve in the office of the Assistant Secretary of the Navy (Installations and Logistics). In 1977, he was given command of the Navy Supply Corps School. He served his final assignment at Fort Wadsworth. Wilson retired in 1987.

Awards he received include the Navy Distinguished Service Medal, the Bronze Star Medal with valor device, the Meritorious Service Medal, and the Vietnam Gallantry Cross.
