= Admiral Wilson (disambiguation) =

Henry Braid Wilson (1861–1954) was a U.S. Navy admiral. Admiral Wilson may also refer to:

- Arthur Wilson (Royal Navy officer) (1842–1921), British Royal Navy admiral
- Barry Wilson (Royal Navy officer) (1936–2018), British Royal Navy vice admiral
- Donald Erwin Wilson (1932–2002), U.S. Navy rear admiral
- George Wilson (Royal Navy officer) (1756–1826), British Royal Navy admiral
- Jesse A. Wilson Jr. (born 1964), U.S. Navy rear admiral
- John Wilson (Royal Navy officer) (1834–1885), British Royal Navy rear admiral

== See also ==
- Russell Willson (1883–1948), U.S. Navy vice admiral
