= McGiffert =

McGiffert is a surname. Notable people with the surname include:

- Arthur Cushman McGiffert (1861–1933), American theologian
- David E. McGiffert (1926–2005), American lawyer and pentagon official
- Natalie McGiffert (born 1997), American rhythmic gymnast
