= Norman R. Augustine =

American aerospace businessman

Norm Augustine
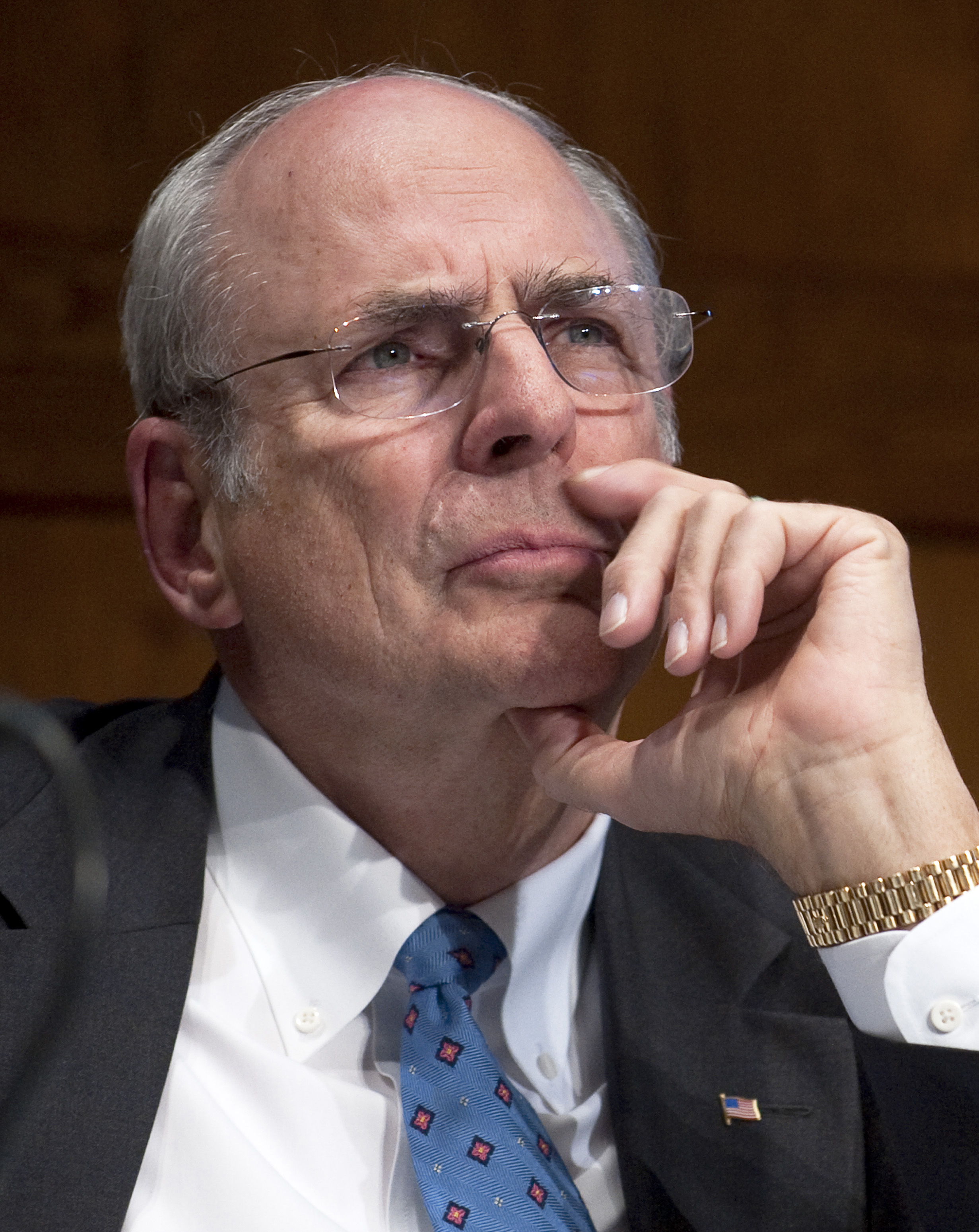

United States Secretary of the Army
- Acting
- In office July 3, 1975 – August 5, 1975
- President: Gerald Ford
- Preceded by: Bo Callaway
- Succeeded by: Martin Richard Hoffmann

United States Under Secretary of the Army
- In office May 1975 – July 1977
- President: Gerald Ford; Jimmy Carter
- Preceded by: Herman R. Staudt
- Succeeded by: Walter B. LaBerge

Personal details
- Born: Norman Ralph Augustine; July 27, 1935 (age 91) Denver, Colorado, U.S.
- Education: Princeton University (BS, MS)

Norman Ralph "Norm" Augustine (born July 27, 1935) is an American aerospace businessman who was United States Under Secretary of the Army from 1975 to 1977. Augustine was chairman and CEO of the Lockheed Martin Corporation. He was chairman of the Review of United States Human Space Flight Plans Committee.

In 1983, Augustine was elected as a member into the National Academy of Engineering for imaginative blending of the skills of engineer, analyst, and manager to accomplish important aerospace engineering projects.

== Early life and education ==
Augustine was raised in Colorado, "an only child in the mountains", and the first of his family to have the opportunity to attend college.

He attended Princeton University, from where he graduated magna cum laude with a B.S.E. in Aeronautical Engineering and an M.S.E. He completed a 295-page senior thesis titled "Preliminary Design for a Supersonic Trainer" with John W. Bittig and Douglas N. Beatty. He was elected to Phi Beta Kappa, Tau Beta Pi and Sigma Xi.

== Career ==
In 1958, he joined the Douglas Aircraft Company in California, where he worked as a research engineer, program manager and chief engineer. Beginning in 1965, he worked in the Office of the Secretary of Defense as Assistant Director of Defense Research and Engineering. He joined LTV Missiles and Space Company in 1970, as vice president of advanced programs and marketing. In 1973 he returned to the government as Assistant Secretary of the Army and in 1975 became Under Secretary of the Army, and later Acting Secretary of the Army. Joining Martin Marietta Corporation in 1977 as vice president of technical operations, he was elected as CEO in 1987 and chairman in 1988, having previously been president and COO. In 1990, he chaired the Advisory Committee on the Future of the U.S. Space Program, known as the Augustine Committee. He was president of the Lockheed Martin Corporation upon the formation of that company in 1995, and became CEO later that year. He retired as CEO of Lockheed Martin in April 1997 to join the faculty of Princeton University in September 1997, where he was a lecturer until July 1999.

In 1999 he helped found In-Q-Tel, a venture capital firm sponsored by the CIA with a mandate to support United States intelligence by investing in advanced technology.

Augustine was chairman and principal officer of the American Red Cross for nine years, chairman of the National Academy of Engineering, president and chairman of the Association of the United States Army, chairman of the Aerospace Industries Association, and chairman of the Defense Science Board. He is a former president of the American Institute of Aeronautics and Astronautics and the Boy Scouts of America. He is a former member of the board of directors of ConocoPhillips, Black & Decker, Procter & Gamble and Lockheed Martin, and was a member of the board of trustees of Colonial Williamsburg. He is a regent of the University System of Maryland, trustee emeritus of Johns Hopkins and a former member of the board of trustees of Princeton and MIT. He is a member of the advisory board to the Department of Homeland Security, was a member of the Hart/Rudman Commission on National Security, and was for 16 years on the President's Council of Advisors on Science and Technology. He is a member of the guiding coalition of the Project on National Security Reform. He is a member of the American Philosophical Society, the National Academy of Arts and Sciences, and the Explorers Club.

In May 2009, Augustine was named as chairman of the Review of United States Human Space Flight Plans Committee, which was tasked to review NASA's plans for the Moon, Mars and beyond.

In March 2011, Augustine agreed to be chair of the U.S. Antarctic Program Blue Ribbon Panel to assess U.S. activities in the South Pole. In July 2011, Augustine became a member of the United States Energy Security Council, which seeks to diminish oil's monopoly over the US transportation sector and is sponsored by the Institute for the Analysis of Global Security (IAGS). He currently sits on the America Abroad Media advisory board, the advisory board of Feynman School, a school for academically gifted children in STEM fields, and on the board of advisors of the Code of Support Foundation, a nonprofit military services organization. He is on the Board of Managers for the Johns Hopkins Applied Physics Laboratory.

== Awards and honors ==
Augustine has been presented the National Medal of Technology by the President of the United States and received the Joint Chiefs of Staff Distinguished Public Service Award. He has five times received the Department of Defense's highest civilian decoration, the Distinguished Civilian Service Award. He is co-author of The Defense Revolution and Shakespeare In Charge and author of Augustine's Laws and Augustine's Travels. He holds 34 honorary degrees and was selected by Who's Who in America and the Library of Congress as one of “Fifty Great Americans” on the occasion of Who's Who's 50th anniversary. He has traveled in over 130 countries and stood on both the North and South Poles.

Graphical plot of Augustine's law Number XVI: "In the year 2054, the entire defense budget will purchase just one aircraft."

- Eagle Scout, 1952
- Member of the National Academy of Engineering, 1983
- National Space Club Goddard Award, 1991
- Fellow of the American Academy of Arts and Sciences, 1992
- Rotary National Award for Space Achievement National Space Trophy, 1992
- Silver Buffalo Award, 1994
- Electronic Industries Association Medal of Honor, 1994
- Golden Plate Award of the American Academy of Achievement, 1995
- The Washingtonian's Business Leader of the Year, 1997
- National Medal of Technology and Innovation, 1997 "For visionary leadership of the aerospace industry, for championing technical and managerial solutions to the many challenges in civil and defense systems, and for contributions to the United States world preeminence in aerospace."
- The NASA Distinguished Public Service Medal, 1997
- IEEE-HKN Eta Kappa Nu Eminent Member, 2001
- Space Foundation's General James E. Hill Lifetime Space Achievement Award in 2002. The highest honor bestowed by the Space Foundation, the award recognizes outstanding individuals who have distinguished themselves through lifetime contributions to the welfare of betterment of humankind through the exploration, development and use of space, or the use of space technology, information, themes or resources in academic, cultural, industrial or other pursuits of broad benefit to humanity. Augustine was the first recipient.
- Public Welfare Medal from the National Academy of Sciences, 2006
- USO's Freedom's Finest Award, 2004
- The Harold W. McGraw Hill, Jr. Prize in Education, 2006
- The 2006 BENS Eisenhower Award [Business Executives for National Security]
- The 2007 Bower Award for Business Leadership, from The Franklin Institute
- NAA Wright Brothers Memorial Trophy, 2008
- National Science Board Vannevar Bush Award, 2008
- IRI Medal from the Industrial Research Institute, 2009
- The American Chemical Society Public Service Award, 2009
- B. Kenneth West Lifetime Achievement Award, 2009
- NAS Award in Aeronautical Engineering from the National Academy of Sciences, 2010
- Drexel University Engineering Leader of the year, 2011
- The Wings Club Distinguished Achievement Award, 2011
- Character Education Partnership's American Patriot of Character Award, 2012
- Montgomery County Business Hall of Fame, 2012
- Industry Week Manufacturing Hall of Fame, 2012
- Smithsonian Air & Space Museum, Lifetime Achievement Trophy Award, 2014
- Arthur C. Clarke Lifetime Achievement Award, 2014
- American Astronautical Society Space Flight Award, 2014
- Advisory Board, Journal of Science Policy & Governance, 2015
- Tech Council of Maryland Lifetime Achievement Award, 2015
- International Von Karman Wings Award, 2015 (For his visionary leadership, contributions to the aerospace industry and distinguished service to the nation's defense, security and space programs)

== Notes ==
Political offices
Preceded by Herman R. Staudt	United States Under Secretary of the Army; 1975–1977	Succeeded by Walter B. LaBerge
Preceded by Bo Callaway	United States Secretary of the Army; Acting; 1975	Succeeded by Martin Richard Hoffmann
Preceded by Eugene Fubini	Chair of the Defense Science Board; 1982–1986	Succeeded by Charles Fowler
Business positions
Preceded by Thomas Pownall	CEO of Martin Marietta; 1987–1995	Position abolished
New office	CEO of Lockheed Martin; 1995–1997	Succeeded by Vance D. Coffman
Non-profit organization positions
Preceded by John L. Clendenin	National President of the Boy Scouts of America; 1994–1996	Succeeded by John W. Creighton Jr.
