= Assistant Secretary of the Navy (Material) =

Civilian office within the United States Department of the Navy

The Assistant Secretary of the Navy (Material) was a civilian office in the United States Department of the Navy, c. 1950s. The Assistant Secretary of the Navy (Material) was responsible for procurement of materials for the United States Navy and the United States Marine Corps.

The office was held by Fred A. Bantz from April 9, 1957, to April 16, 1959.
