= Robert H. B. Baldwin =

American businessman (1920–2016)

United States Under Secretary of the Navy
- In office July 2, 1965 – July 31, 1967
- Preceded by: Charles F. Baird
- Succeeded by: Kenneth E. BeLieu

Personal details
- Born: Robert Hayes Burns Baldwin; June 9, 1920 East Orange, New Jersey
- Died: January 3, 2016 (aged 95) Skillman, New Jersey
- Education: Princeton University
- Occupation: Businessman, banker

Robert Hayes Burns Baldwin (July 9, 1920 – January 3, 2016) was the chairman of Morgan Stanley when the bank was taken public in the 1970s. He is noted for significantly expanding the wealth of the firm during his tenure there. He was also appointed by President Lyndon B. Johnson to be the Undersecretary of the United States Navy during the Vietnam War. The town of Baldwin Park, Florida, and its Lake Baldwin, are named after him, in honor of this service.

Baldwin was born in East Orange, New Jersey in 1920. After leaving Morgan Stanley, he served as the Chairman of the Geraldine R. Dodge Foundation and also as the head of several other charitable entities.

A 1942 graduate of Princeton University, Baldwin was awarded the Roper Trophy for his excellence as a three-sport athlete in baseball, basketball, and football during his time at the Ivy League institution. In addition, Baldwin is listed as a lifetime member of Augusta National Golf Club, the home of the Masters Tournament. He died on January 3, 2016, in Skillman, New Jersey.
