= Augustine's laws =

Aphorisms by Norman Ralph Augustine

Augustine's laws were a series of tongue in cheek aphorisms put forth by Norman Ralph Augustine, an American aerospace businessman who served as Under Secretary of the Army from 1975 to 1977. In 1984 he published his laws. The book and several of the laws were the topic of an article in Sound and Vibration magazine in March 2012.

== Law 16 ==
Exponential growth of aircraft cost.

His most cited law is number 16, which shows that defense budgets grow linearly but the unit cost of a new military aircraft grows exponentially:

In the year 2054, the entire defense budget will purchase just one tactical aircraft. This aircraft will have to be shared by the Air Force and Navy 3½ days each per week except for leap year, when it will be made available to the Marines for the extra day."

Gregory C. Allen, a former defense official, produced an updated fighter aircraft unit cost data set in 2024, which found that the initial cost targets for AI-enabled autonomous aircraft, such as the Collaborative Combat Aircraft, would represent the first meaningful deviation in Law 16.

== See also ==
- Moore's Law, where unit costs shrink with time
- List of eponymous laws
