= Walter B. LaBerge =

18th United States under secretary of the Army (1924-2004)

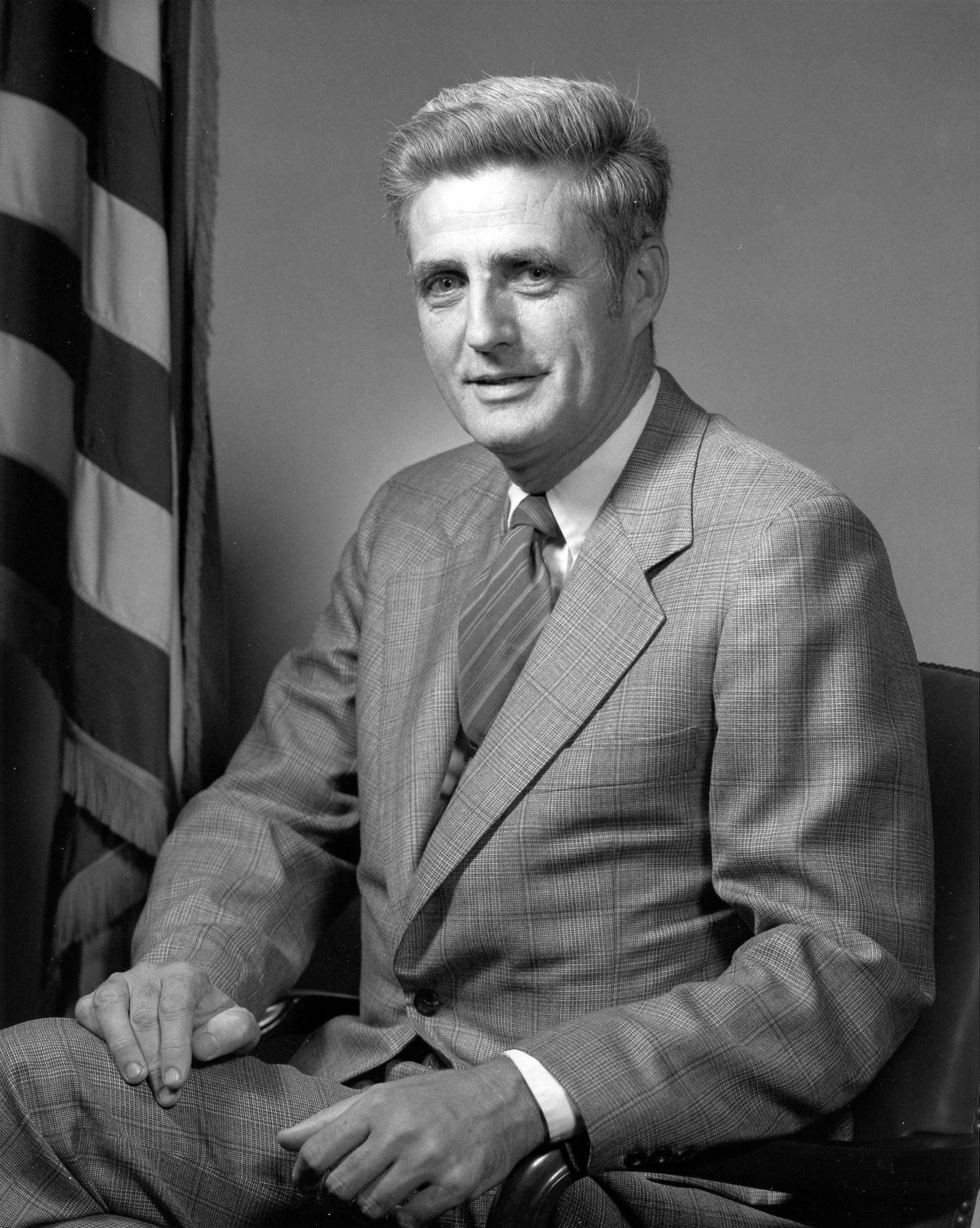

United States Under Secretary of the Army
- In office July 1977 – February 1980
- President: Jimmy Carter
- Preceded by: Norman R. Augustine
- Succeeded by: Robert Harry Spiro Jr.

Military service
- Allegiance: United States
- Branch/service: United States Navy
- Years of service: 1944-1946
- Rank: Captain

Walter Barber LaBerge (March 29, 1924 – July 16, 2004) was an aerospace engineer and defense industry executive who served as United States Under Secretary of the Army from 1977 to 1980.

== Biography ==
=== Early life ===
LaBerge was born in Chicago in 1924. His father was a salesman selling industrial brushes for the Osborn Brush Company. He was educated at Proviso Township High School in Maywood, Illinois, and the University of Notre Dame, receiving a degree in Naval Science in 1944.

=== Career ===
After graduating, LaBerge joined the United States Navy (then in the midst of World War II) and was posted to the yard minesweeper USS YMS-165 based in Palau. He was promoted to the rank of Captain in 1946.

Upon leaving the Navy, LaBerge returned to Notre Dame, and shortly thereafter married Patricia Sammon of River Forest, Illinois. He received a B.S. in Physics from Notre Dame in 1947 and a Ph.D. in Physics in 1950.

In 1950, LaBerge became Program Engineer for the AIM-9 Sidewinder at the Naval Ordnance Test Center in China Lake, California. He was promoted in 1955, becoming Program Manager of the Sidewinder program.

In 1957, LaBerge moved to Philco as director of engineering at its Western Development Laboratories in Palo Alto, California. (Philco was acquired by the Ford Motor Company in 1961, becoming Philco Ford.) Beginning in 1962, LaBerge headed up the Philco Ford team that designed and installed the instrumentation of the Manned Spacecraft Center in Houston. During this period, he worked closely with NASA officials, and got to know several of the original United States astronauts. In 1963, he was promoted to director of the Philco Ford's Houston operation. He returned to Palo Alto in 1966 as division vice president, then vice president for the Electronics Group, at Philco Ford's Western Development Laboratories.

LaBerge returned to Naval Air Weapons Station China Lake (as the Naval Ordnance Test Center had been renamed) in 1971 as deputy technical director and then as technical director.

In 1973, President of the United States Richard Nixon nominated LaBerge as Assistant Secretary of the Air Force (Research and Development). He held this post until 1976, when he became Assistant Secretary General (Defense Support) at NATO in Brussels.

In 1977, President Jimmy Carter nominated LaBerge as United States Under Secretary of the Army and he subsequently held this office from July 27, 1977, until February 28, 1980. On February 15, 1979, he also became Principal Deputy to the Under Secretary of Defense (Research and Engineering), and continued to hold this post until 1981, even after he relinquished his office as Under Secretary of the Army.

Upon leaving the United States Department of Defense in 1981, LaBerge became an executive at Lockheed, serving as corporate vice president of the Lockheed Missile and Space Company in Sunnyvale, California, from 1981 to 1985, and then as Lockheed's Vice President of Advanced Planning at Calabasas, California, from 1985 to 1989.

=== Later years ===
LaBerge retired in 1989. In retirement, he served as chair of the Army Science Board. He also held several academic appointments, including senior researcher at the Institute of Advanced Technology at the University of Texas at Austin; visiting professor at the Defense Systems Management College at the Defense Acquisition University in Fort Belvoir, Virginia; and visiting professor of physics at the Naval Postgraduate School in Monterey, California.

A genealogy enthusiast, LaBerge traced his genealogy back to Robert de La Berge, one of the original settlers of New France.

LaBerge died in Santa Cruz, California, on July 16, 2004. He was 80 years old.

Government offices
Preceded by Norman Ralph Augustine	United States Under Secretary of the Army; July 27, 1977 – February 28, 1980	Succeeded by Robert Harry Spiro, Jr.
