= Thaddeus Beal =

American lawyer

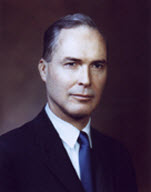

United States Under Secretary of the Army
- In office March 8, 1969 – September 21, 1971
- President: Richard Nixon
- Preceded by: David E. McGiffert
- Succeeded by: Kenneth E. BeLieu

Personal details
- Born: March 22, 1917
- Died: May 2, 1981 (aged 64)
- Education: Yale University

Military service
- Allegiance: United States of America
- Branch/service: U.S. Navy
- Years of service: 1941-1945
- Rank: Lieutenant commander
- Battles/wars: World War II

Thaddeus Reynolds Beal (1917-1981) was the United States Under Secretary of the Army from March 8, 1969, through September 21, 1971.

Born March 22, 1917, in New York City, Beal graduated from The Hotchkiss School in Connecticut and received a B.A. degree from Yale University, 1939. He served in U.S. Naval Reserve attaining rank of lieutenant commander, 1941–1945. He received an LL.B. degree from Harvard Law School, 1947 and was admitted to Massachusetts bar, 1947. He associated with the law firm of Herrick, Smith, Donald, Farley and Ketchum of Boston, Massachusetts, as associate and later as partner, 1947–1956. He was president and chief executive officer, Harvard Trust Company of Cambridge, Massachusetts, 1957–1969. He was active in business and community organizations in greater Boston area as trustee, Cambridge Savings Bank and Boston Personal Property Trust, director of Middlesex Mutual Insurance Company, member of Cambridge Redevelopment Authority, and trustee of Radcliffe College.

In 1972, after his term as Under Secretary of the Army ended, he resumed practice of law as a member of the firm of Herrick, Smith, Donald, Farley and Ketchum. He died May 2, 1981.

Government offices
Preceded by David E. McGiffert	United States Under Secretary of the Army; March 1969 – September 1971	Succeeded by Kenneth E. BeLieu
