= Fred A. Bantz =

American military official (1895–1982)

Fred Bantz
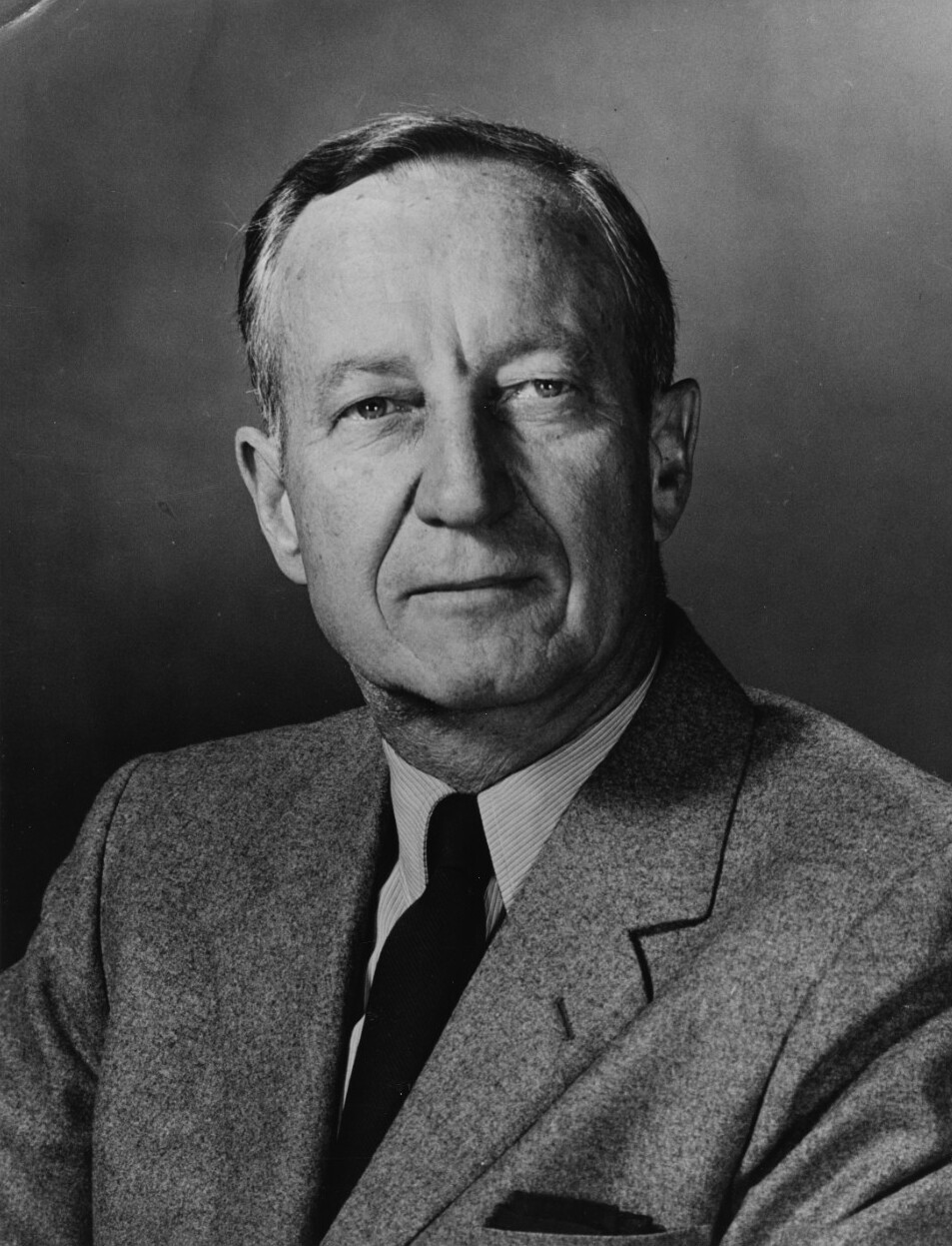

11th United States Under Secretary of the Navy
- In office June 8, 1959 – January 20, 1961
- Preceded by: William B. Franke
- Succeeded by: Paul B. Fay

Assistant Secretary of the Navy (Material)
- In office April 9, 1957 – April 16, 1959
- Preceded by: William B. Franke
- Succeeded by: None

Personal details
- Born: June 25, 1895 Saint Paul, Minnesota, U.S.
- Died: September 22, 1982 (aged 87) Delray Beach, Florida, U.S.
- Party: Republican
- Occupation: Buyer; Vice president

Fred A. Bantz (June 25, 1895 – September 22, 1982) was an official in the United States Department of the Navy during the administration of Dwight D. Eisenhower. He served as Under Secretary of the Navy from 1959 to 1961.

== Biography ==
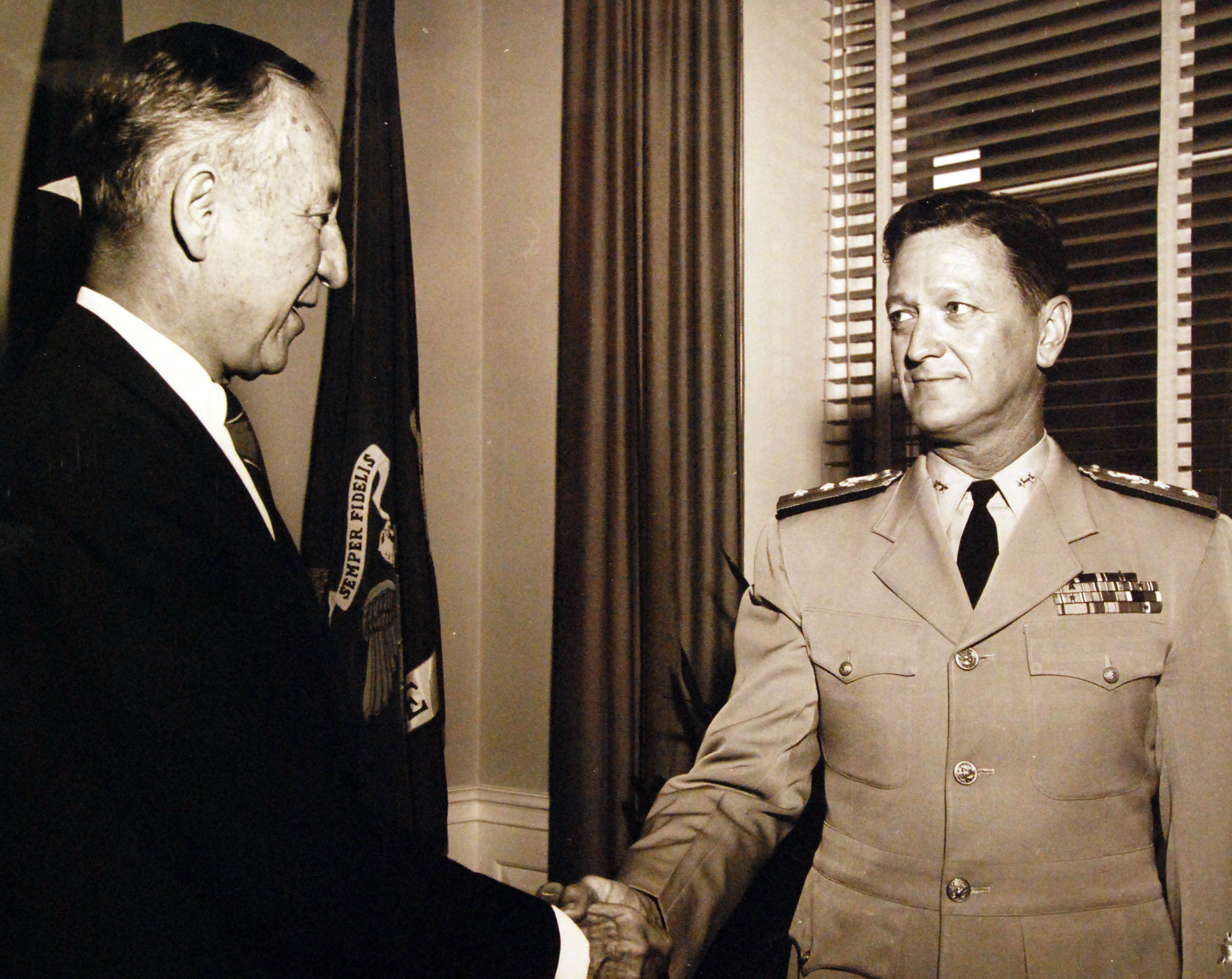
Fred A. Bantz (left) with Rear Admiral Lot Ensey

Bantz was born in Saint Paul, Minnesota, to Matthias and Louise Bantz on June 25, 1895. He married Kathryn A. McDonald on January 4, 1923. Bantz joined JCPenney in 1922 as a buyer. He rose through the ranks, becoming a J. C. Penney vice president in 1950, and worked there until July 1, 1955.

In 1957, President Dwight D. Eisenhower appointed Bantz as Assistant Secretary of the Navy (Material), a post he held until 1959. At that time, President Eisenhower nominated Bantz as Under Secretary of the Navy and he served in that capacity from June 8, 1959, to January 20, 1961.

Bantz was active in charity work in the 1960s, serving as chairman of the fundraising committees of the American Red Cross and the American Cancer Society.

He died at his home in Delray Beach, Florida, on September 22, 1982, at the age of 87.

Government offices
Preceded by William B. Franke	Under Secretary of the Navy; June 8, 1959 – January 20, 1961	Succeeded by Paul B. Fay
