= Herman R. Staudt =

United States government official

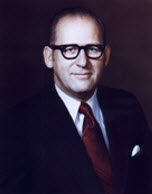

United States Under Secretary of the Army
- In office October 1973 – May 1975
- President: Richard Nixon
- Preceded by: Kenneth E. BeLieu
- Succeeded by: Norman R. Augustine

Personal details
- Born: June 29, 1926 Yonkers, New York
- Died: March 6, 2008 (aged 81) Longwood, Florida

Military service
- Allegiance: United States
- Branch/service: United States Army
- Years of service: 1945–1947
- Rank: Staff Sergeant

Herman Raymond Staudt (June 29, 1926 – March 6, 2008) was United States Under Secretary of the Army from 1973 to 1975.

== Biography ==
=== Early years ===
Herman R. Staudt was born in Yonkers, New York, on June 29, 1926. At age 19, he enrolled in the United States Army in 1945, in the midst of World War II. He served in the Army until 1947, leaving with the rank of Staff Sergeant. He was educated at New York University, receiving his B.S. in Electrical Engineering in 1947, and then at Rutgers University, receiving an M.S. in Electrical Engineering in 1949.

After graduating, Staudt joined the Signal Corps Laboratories, a part of the U.S. Army Signal Corps, at Fort Monmouth, first as a field test engineer then as chief project engineer, and then as chief of the Tactical Systems Section.

=== Career ===
In 1954, Staudt joined Martin Marietta in Baltimore, working as assistant project engineer on the MGM-1 Matador, then as project engineer of the Missile Master Electronic Defense System, then as operations manager of its Electronics Division. In 1957, he transferred from Baltimore to Orlando to become director of Martin Marietta's MGM-18 Lacrosse missile program. He was director of the MGM-31 Pershing program from 1961 to 1967.

In 1967, Staudt enrolled in the MIT Sloan School of Management and received an M.S. in Management in 1968.

Staudt returned to Martin Marietta in 1968 as vice president, Management Operations. In 1972, he became vice president of operations for the Martin Marietta's Orlando Aerospace Division.

In 1973, President Richard Nixon nominated Staudt as United States Under Secretary of the Army and Staudt subsequently held this office from October 16, 1973, until May 22, 1975.

Government offices
Preceded by Kenneth E. BeLieu	United States Under Secretary of the Army; October 16, 1973 – May 22, 1975	Succeeded by Norman Ralph Augustine
