= Assistant Secretary of the Navy (Installations and Logistics) =

Civilian office in the US Navy

The Assistant Secretary of the Navy (Installations and Logistics) (abbreviated ASN (I&L)) was a civilian office in the United States Department of the Navy, c. 1960s-1970s. The Assistant Secretary of the Navy (Installations and Logistics) was responsible for all U.S. naval installations and for managing the logistics of the United States Navy and the United States Marine Corps.

Kenneth E. BeLieu held this position from 1961 to 1965.
