= David E. McGiffert =

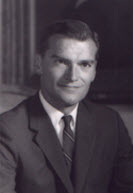

Assistant Secretary of Defense for International Security Affairs
- In office April 4, 1977 – January 20, 1981
- President: Jimmy Carter
- Preceded by: Eugene V. McAuliffe
- Succeeded by: Bing West

United States Under Secretary of the Army
- In office November 1965 – February 1969
- President: Lyndon B. Johnson
- Preceded by: Stanley Rogers Resor
- Succeeded by: Thaddeus Beal

Assistant Secretary of Defense for Legislative Affairs
- In office August 8, 1962 – June 30, 1965
- President: John F. Kennedy
- Preceded by: Norman S. Paul
- Succeeded by: Jack L. Stempler

Personal details
- Born: June 27, 1926 Boston, Massachusetts, U.S.
- Died: October 12, 2005 (aged 79) Washington, D.C., U.S.
- Party: Democratic
- Spouse: Enid
- Children: 2
- Education: Harvard University (BA, LLB); University of Cambridge

Military service
- Allegiance: United States
- Branch/service: United States Navy
- Years of service: 1944-1946
- Rank: Radio Technician
- Battles/wars: World War II

David Eliot McGiffert (June 27, 1926 – October 12, 2005) was a United States lawyer and Pentagon official who dealt with domestic security during the social upheavals of the late 1960s.

== Biography ==
David E. McGiffert was born in Boston on June 27, 1926. After high school, he enrolled at the University of California, Berkeley, but left without taking a degree in 1944. He then enlisted in the United States Navy and served as a radio technician during World War II. Upon leaving the Navy in 1946, he attended Harvard University; he graduated with a B.A. in 1949. He spent the 1949-50 school year at Cambridge University and then attended Harvard Law School, receiving his LL.B. in 1953.

After graduating from law school, McGiffert took a job as an associate attorney at Covington & Burling in Washington, D.C. He spent 1956 as a lecturer at the University of Wisconsin Law School, and then returned to Covington & Burling from 1957 to 1961.

In 1962, President of the United States John F. Kennedy named McGiffert Assistant Secretary of Defense for Legislative Affairs, serving under United States Secretary of Defense Robert McNamara. He held this position until 1965, at which time President Lyndon B. Johnson named him United States Under Secretary of the Army.

He served as Under Secretary of the Army from November 1965 until February 1969. During his time as Under Secretary of the Army, protests against the Vietnam War broke out in force, and there were calls on the army to support desegregation and equal rights.

During the 1967 Newark riots (July 12–17, 1967) and the 1967 Detroit riot (July 23, 1967), ill-prepared Army National Guard troops were despatched to suppress the riots.

On October 21, 1967, some 35,000 anti-war protesters organized by the National Mobilization Committee to End the War in Vietnam, gathered for a demonstration at the Defense Department (the "March on the Pentagon"), where they were confronted by some 2,500 armed soldiers. During the protest, a famous event occurred, where George Harris placed carnations into the soldiers' gun barrels. Abbie Hoffman declared the group's intention of levitating the Pentagon 300 feet (90 m) by means of meditation, wobbling it once in mid-air in order to exorcise evil spirits. In the wake of these protests McGiffert took the lead in organizing the Directorate for Civil Disturbance Planning and Operation, a "domestic war room" at the Pentagon. About this time, the Pentagon also set up a large computer database containing the names of individuals suspected of fostering domestic disturbances. (This controversial program would be shut down in 1970.)

At Secretary McNamara's direction, McGiffert then headed a civil disturbance steering committee to examine the domestic use of the United States Armed Forces. United States Deputy Attorney General Warren Christopher also served on this committee. In the tense atmosphere, further heightened by the assassination of Martin Luther King, Jr. on April 4, 1968, and the assassination of Robert F. Kennedy on June 5, 1968, this committee undertook detailed intelligence and tactical planning based on "worst case" domestic scenarios.

Regular Army troops were also used to provide security at the 1968 Republican National Convention (August 5–8, 1968) and the disastrous 1968 Democratic National Convention (August 26–29, 1968).

Upon leaving the United States Department of the Army in 1969, McGiffert returned to Covington & Burling as a partner. He was active in the Democratic Party, serving on the Defense and Arms Control Study Group of the Democratic Party's Foreign Affairs Task Force from 1974 to 1976.

With the election of Jimmy Carter in the 1976 election, McGiffert contributed position papers to President Carter's transition team. On February 25, 1977, President Carter nominated McGiffert as United States Assistant Secretary of Defense for International Security Affairs. In this capacity, McGiffert would be responsible for overseeing military security in the Middle East.

With the end of the Carter administration, McGiffert returned to Covington & Burling and practiced law there until his retirement in 1995.

He was a member of the Council on Foreign Relations and served on the boards of the Atlantic Council and the Center for Naval Analyses.

McGiffert died of a heart ailment on October 12, 2005, at his home in Washington, D.C. He was 79 years old.

Government offices
Preceded by Stanley Rogers Resor	United States Under Secretary of the Army; November 1965 – February 1969	Succeeded by Thaddeus Beal
