= Holway, Wisconsin =

- Town
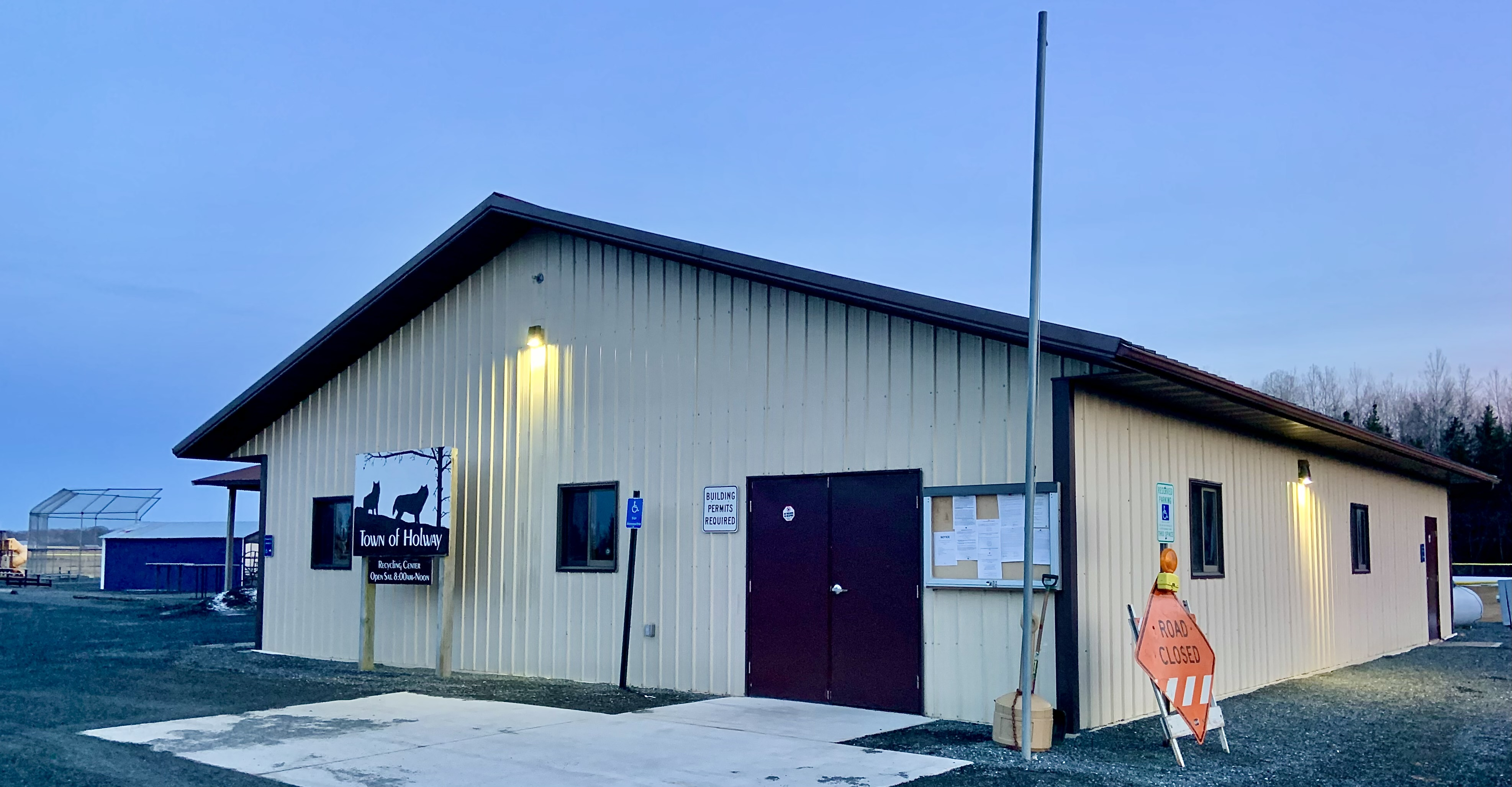
- Town hall

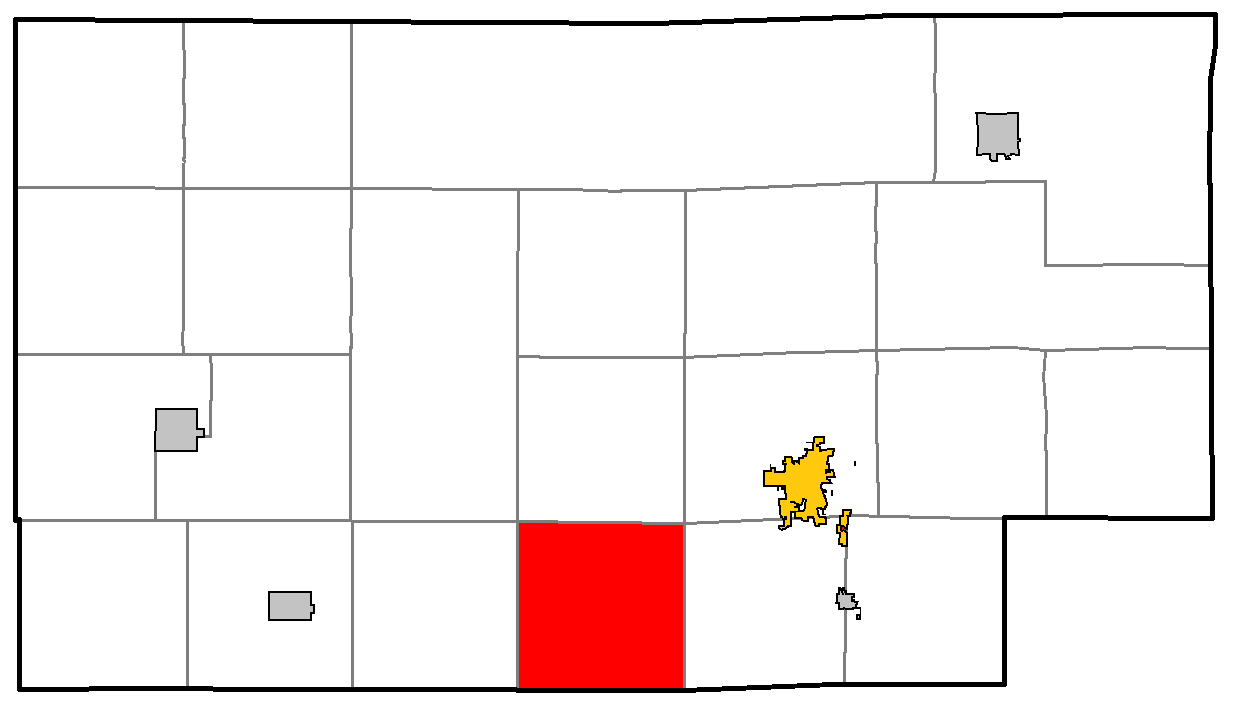
- Location of Holway, within Taylor County

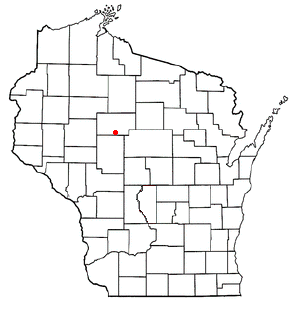
- Location of Holway, Wisconsin
- Coordinates: 45°4′51″N 90°29′35″W
- Country: United States
- State: Wisconsin
- County: Taylor

Area
  - Total: 36.4 sq mi (94.2 km^{2})
  - Land: 36.4 sq mi (94.2 km^{2})
  - Water: 0 sq mi (0.0 km^{2})
- Elevation: 1,335 ft (407 m)

Population (2020)
  - Total: 930
  - Density: 26/sq mi (9.9/km^{2})
- Time zone: UTC-6 (Central (CST))
  - Summer (DST): UTC-5 (CDT)
- Area codes: 715 & 534
- FIPS code: 55-35525
- GNIS feature ID: 1583406
- PLSS township: T30N R1W

Holway is a town in Taylor County, Wisconsin, United States. The population was 930 at the 2020 census.

== Geography ==
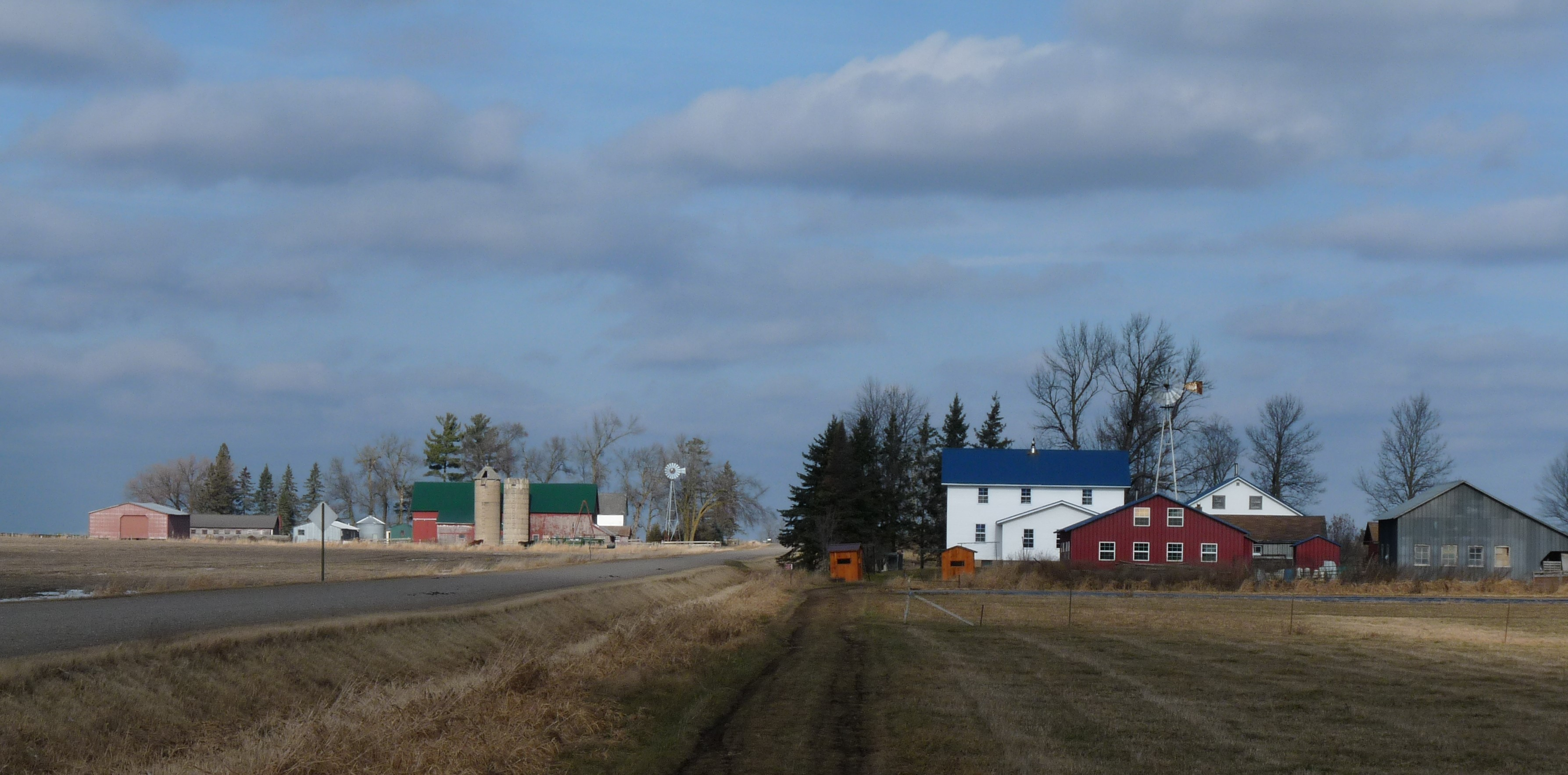

According to the United States Census Bureau, the town has a total area of 36.4 square miles (94.2 km^{2}), of which 36.3 square miles (94.1 km^{2}) is land and 0.03% is water. The surface is fairly level as it was not reached by the last glacier which bulldozed the Perkinstown terminal moraine to the north. The soil of most of Holway is considered to be Merrill till.

== History ==
The six mile (10 km) square that would become Holway was first surveyed in the summer of 1847 by a crew working for the U.S. government. Then in 1854 another crew marked all the section corners in the township, walking through the woods and swamps, measuring with chain and compass. When done, the deputy surveyor filed this general description:

The Surface of this Township is generally level the dry land is but very little elevated above the Swamps the Soil is poor 3rd rate bearing but little vegetation but is generally covered with a thick heavy moss. The Timber is principally Hemlock & Birch with a few Scattering trees of White Pine of poor quality. The Township is well watered by numerous Small Streams of good pure water. There are no Settlers in the Township.

At the formation of Taylor County in 1875, the six-mile square that would become Holway was part of the original town of Little Black, which spanned the width of the county from east to west. An 1880 map of central Wisconsin shows no roads in the six-mile square, but two roads of some sort reach the east edge - one from Stetsonville and one from the community of Little Black. The map also shows a farm in section 29, labelled A.E. Sawyer. Sawyer ran a logging firm in Black River Falls.

The town of Holway was split off in 1895. It was first named Pine-lake, then changed to Holway, for Nymphus B. Holway, a wealthy lumberman from Maine.

A map from 1900 shows lots of settlement activity. The grid of roads was fairly complete for the easternmost two miles. A wagon road followed the course of modern Elm Avenue all the way across the town. Another road, a forerunner of Apple Avenue, reached across to within a mile and a half of the west end. Settlers' homesteads were started in along these roads. Two rural schools and a church were shown on Apple Ave. Two more rural schools were probably (that part of the map is blurry) shown along Elm. It appears there were also two sawmills in the south of the town. Holway's Dam was marked on Trappers Creek in section 15. The west end was still held in larger chunks, with few settlers. There J.M. Holway owned the most land by far. Sawyer and Austin still held a chunk and the Wisconsin Central Railroad held a few parcels in the odd-numbered sections, remnants of its payment for building the railroad line up through the wilderness and creating Medford and Stetsonville in the early 1870s.

The 1911 plat map shows thicker settlers, and some extension of the roads beyond the 1900 map. A sawmill is at Holway's dam. The west end still has few settlers, with N.B. Holway and Benson & Anderton the largest land-owners. Upham Manufacturing of Marshfield owns a smaller chunk.

Amish families began to arrive in Holway in 1921 - initially from Kansas, but then other places. In those first years they bought cut-over land for $30 per acre from J.S. Owen and cleared it. These are Old Order Amish who refer to themselves as Curtiss Colony, which is centered in Holway. As of 1974, this colony was divided into several church districts.

== Demographics ==
As of the census of 2000, there were 854 people, 263 households, and 213 families residing in the town. The population density was 23.5 people per square mile (9.1/km^{2}). There were 284 housing units at an average density of 7.8 per square mile (3.0/km^{2}). The racial makeup of the town was 99.77% White, 0.12% Native American, and 0.12% from two or more races. Hispanic or Latino of any race were 0.12% of the population.

There were 263 households, out of which 42.2% had children under the age of 18 living with them, 67.7% were married couples living together, 6.5% had a female householder with no husband present, and 19.0% were non-families. 16.7% of all households were made up of individuals, and 7.2% had someone living alone who was 65 years of age or older. The average household size was 3.25 and the average family size was 3.71.

In the town, the population was spread out, with 32.4% under the age of 18, 10.9% from 18 to 24, 30.7% from 25 to 44, 17.3% from 45 to 64, and 8.7% who were 65 years of age or older. The median age was 30 years. For every 100 females, there were 106.3 males. For every 100 females age 18 and over, there were 106.8 males.

The median income for a household in the town was $37,500, and the median income for a family was $44,464. Males had a median income of $27,333 versus $23,472 for females. The per capita income for the town was $13,718. About 14.9% of families and 20.8% of the population were below the poverty line, including 23.3% of those under age 18 and 25.0% of those age 65 or over.
