= Laguna Woods Village =

Retirement community in Laguna Woods, California

Coordinates: 33°37′05″N 117°43′06″W

Laguna Woods Village is an age-restricted community for people aged 55 and over in Laguna Woods, California. It is the largest and most populous of the five similar communities in the city. The village, formerly known as Rossmoor-Leisure World, was developed by Ross Cortese, a former fruit stand owner turned retirement community developer.

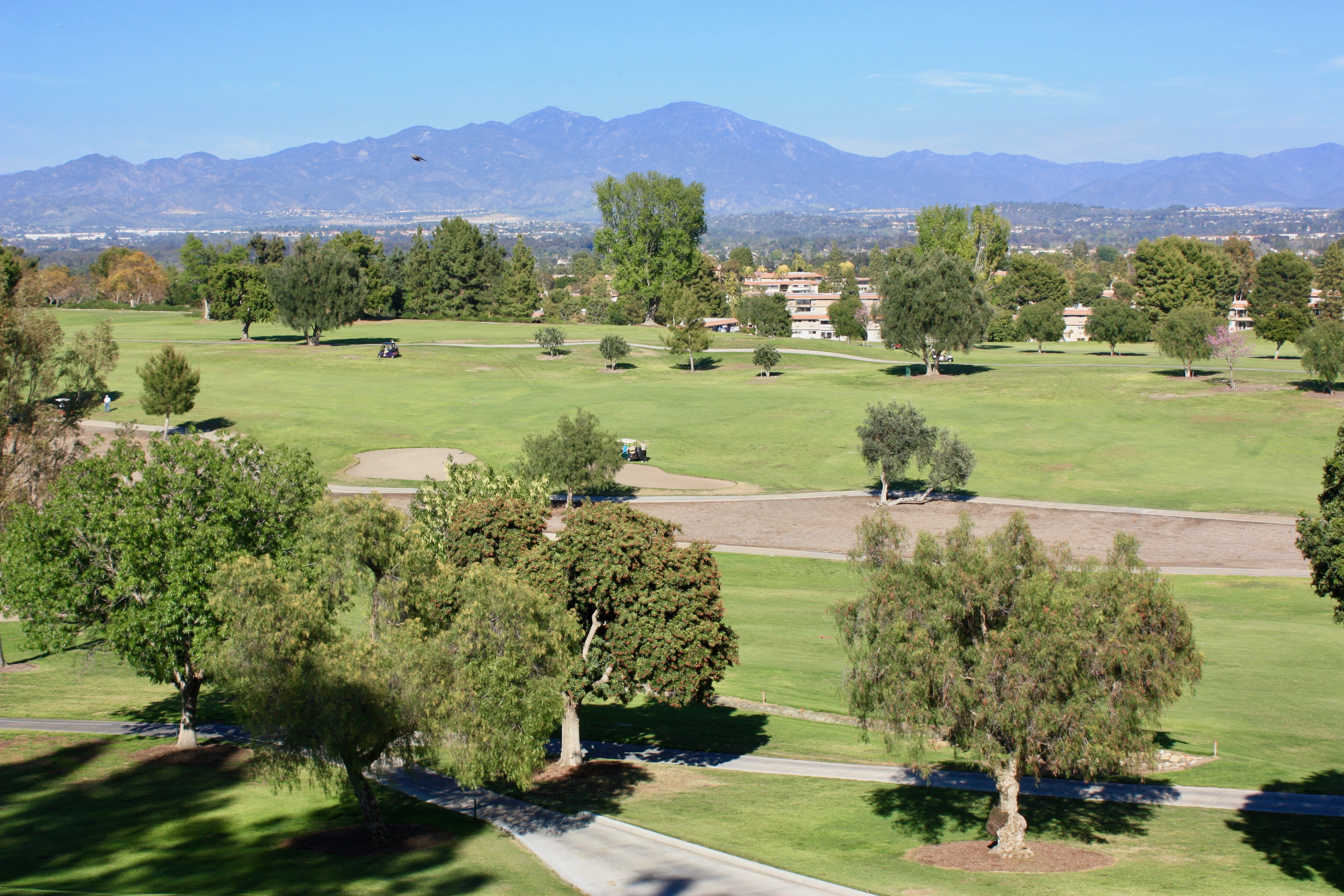
Laguna Woods Village Golf Course as viewed from the clubhouse restaurant

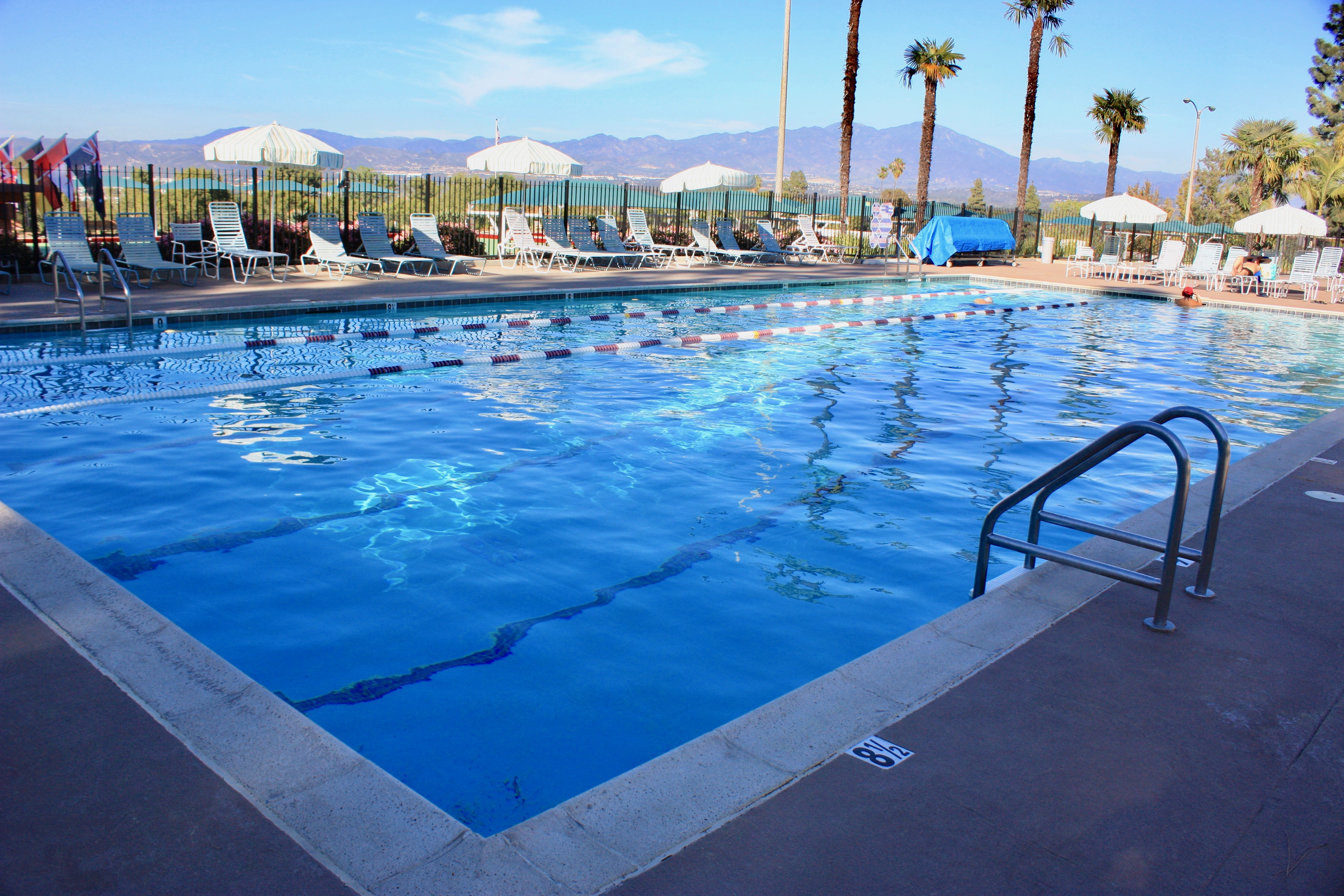
One of the swimming pools at Laguna Woods Village

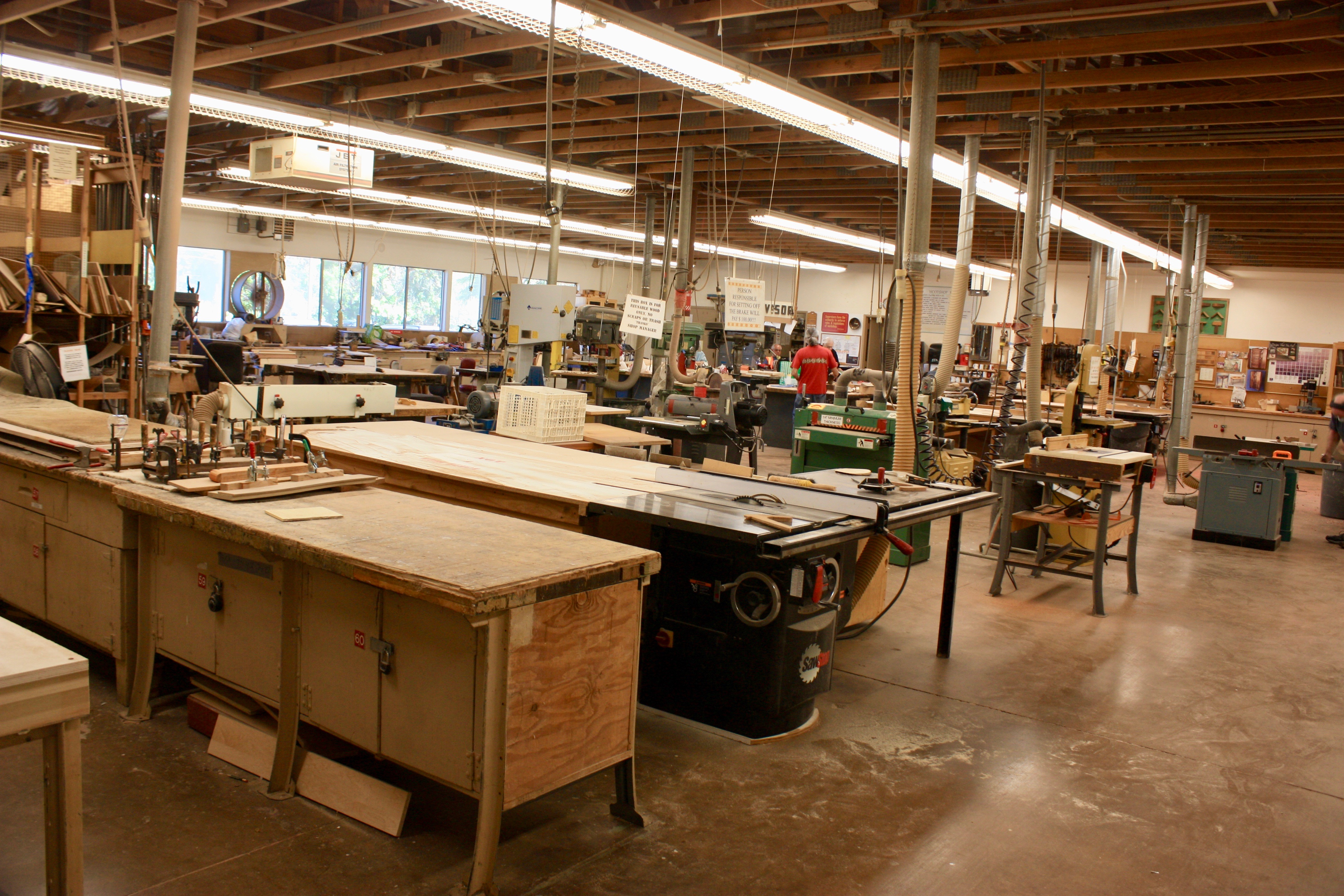
Woodworking shop at Laguna Woods Village

== History ==
Ross Cortese's early success in 1961 with Leisure World Seal Beach provided the concept of what would become Laguna Woods Village. Cortese purchased several sites across the nation, including 3,500 acres (14 km^{2}) of rural land on the Moulton Ranch, located in the Saddleback Valley of southern Orange County, California.

Construction of Laguna Woods Village began in the spring of 1963 with an initial phase of 530 units. The first ten homeowners moved into the community on September 10, 1964.

In October 2005 the community formally changed its name to what is now known as Laguna Woods Village, to avoid copyright disagreements with the estate of Ross Cortese over the use of the Leisure World name.

== Geography ==
Laguna Woods Village is located within the city of Laguna Woods, California, which was incorporated in 1999 as Orange County's 32nd city. Laguna Woods Village comprises approximately ninety percent of the city's 4 square miles (10 km^{2}). Laguna Woods is bordered by Irvine, Lake Forest, Laguna Hills, Aliso Viejo, and Laguna Beach. Aliso Creek roughly bisects the community.

== Demographics ==
The average age of the residents of Laguna Woods Village is 78. There are more than 18,000 residents.

== Governance structure ==
The governance of the community is organized under the California Non Profit Mutual Benefit Corporation Law. There are four such corporations, two of which are mutual housing corporations, a third is the Golden Rain Foundation (commonly called GRF) which manages all common amenities and grounds, and a fourth, Village Management Services Board which oversees the self-owned management company. The housing mutuals are responsible for services directly related to housing and common areas within their mutual and the GRF is responsible for all shared community amenities.

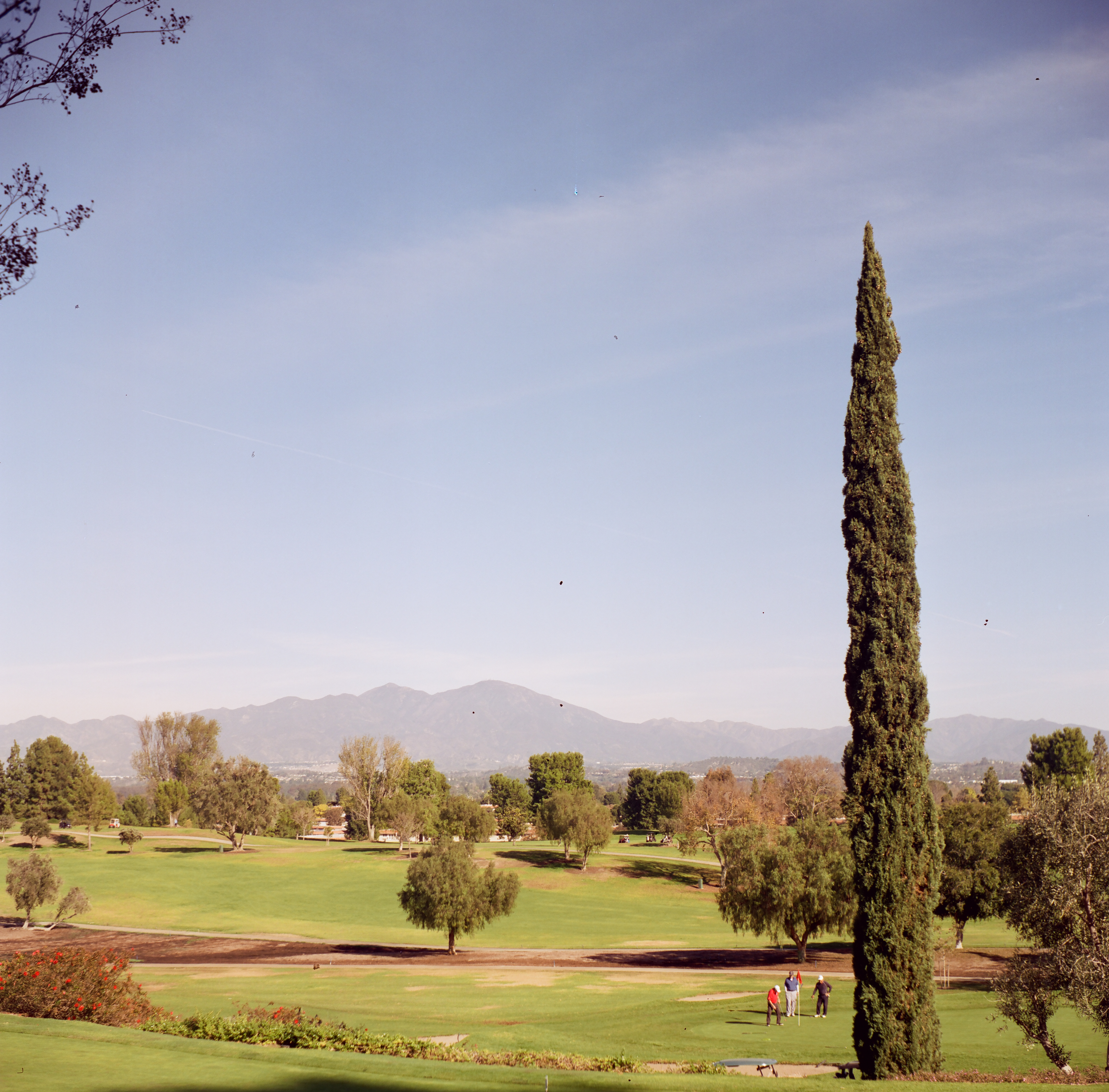
Laguna Woods Golf Course in 2021

== Recreation and amenities ==
The community has fourteen guarded gates with a private security department that provides traffic enforcement, patrol service and gate control 24 hours a day. Residences here are made up of three housing corporations known as Mutuals. The Third Mutual includes single-family homes and condo units. United Mutual offers 18 different sizes of co-op condos. The Towers 50 Mutual offers condo units in two high rise buildings. Homes are referred to as manors and owners are required to meet minimum financial requirements for purchase and a background check. In total there are 94 floor plans available in the community that range from 675 to 2,589 square feet (62.7 to 240.5 m^{2}).

Recreation includes five swimming pools with four hot pools, a 27-hole PGA-rated golf course and a three par nine-hole executive course, three fitness centers, ten tennis courts, horse stables, seven paddle tennis courts, and pickleball courts (4 lighted), bocce courts, and seven clubhouses. There is an arts and crafts clubhouse with slip casting, pottery, sculpture, lapidary, stained glass, sewing, quilting, jewelry, glass enamel on copper, a wood shop, a machine shop, an art studio and photography. There are also lawn bowling courts, shuffleboard courts, ping-pong tables, pool tables, and indoor archery.

There are over 250 official clubs in Laguna Woods Village. Dozens of classes and activities are organized by the community's recreation department. In addition, nearby Saddleback College offers over 200 emeritus classes within Laguna Woods Village.

== Management ==
Laguna Woods Village is self managed by Village Management Services, Inc.
