= Chief of Staff of the United States Air Force =

Senior-most officer and service chief of the United States Air Force

Chief of Staff of the Air Force
- Seal of the chief of staff

- Flag of the chief of staff

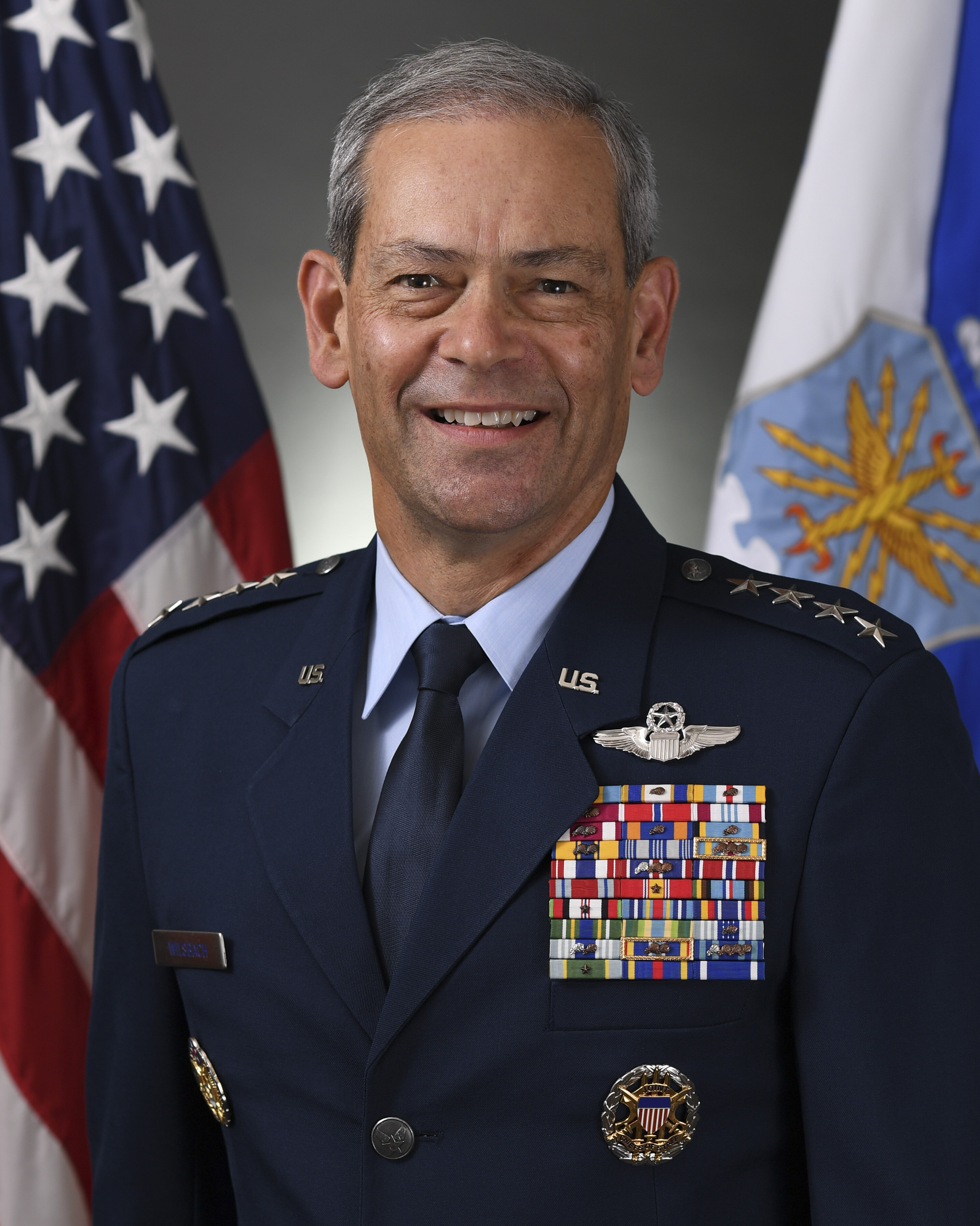
- Incumbent; General Kenneth S. Wilsbach since 3 November 2025
- United States Air Force; Air Staff
- Type: Service chief
- Abbreviation: CSAF; AF/CC
- Member of: Joint Chiefs of Staff
- Reports to: Secretary of Defense; Secretary of the Air Force
- Residence: Quarters 7, Joint Base Myer–Henderson Hall
- Seat: The Pentagon, Arlington, Virginia
- Appointer: The president; with Senate advice and consent
- Term length: 4 years; Renewable once, only during war or national emergency
- Constituting instrument: 10 U.S.C. § 9033
- Precursor: Commanding General, United States Army Air Forces
- Formation: 18 September 1947
- First holder: Gen Carl A. Spaatz
- Deputy: Vice Chief of Staff of the Air Force
- Website: Official Website

The chief of staff of the Air Force (acronym: CSAF, or AF/CC) is the service chief of the United States Air Force. They are the principal military advisor to the secretary of the Air Force on matter pertaining to the Air Force. They are a member of the Joint Chiefs of Staff, and thereby a military adviser to the National Security Council, the secretary of defense, and the president. The chief of staff is typically the highest-ranking officer on active duty in the Air Force, unless the chairman and/or the vice chairman of the Joint Chiefs of Staff are Air Force officers.

The chief of staff of the Air Force is an administrative position based in the Pentagon. The chief of staff does not have operational command authority over Air Force forces. That is within the purview of the combatant commanders who report to the secretary of defense. The chief of staff exercises supervision of Air Force units and organizations as the designee of the secretary of the Air Force.

The 24th and current chief of staff of the Air Force is General Kenneth S. Wilsbach.

== Responsibilities ==
=== Department of the Air Force ===
Under the authority, direction and control of the secretary of the Air Force, the chief of staff presides over the Air Staff. They act as the secretary's executive agent in carrying out approved plans, and exercises supervision, consistent with authority assigned to the commanders of the unified combatant commands, over organizations and members of the Air Force as determined by the secretary. The chief of staff may perform other duties as assigned by either the president, the secretary of defense or the secretary of the Air Force.

The vice chief of staff of the Air Force, also a four-star general, is the chief of staff's principal deputy.

=== Member of the Joint Chiefs of Staff ===
The chief of staff of the Air Force is a member of the Joint Chiefs of Staff as prescribed by 10 U.S.C. § 151. When performing his JCS duties, the chief of staff is directly responsible to the secretary of defense. Like the other members of the Joint Chiefs of Staff, the chief of staff is an administrative position, with no operational command authority over the United States Air Force.

== Appointment and rank ==
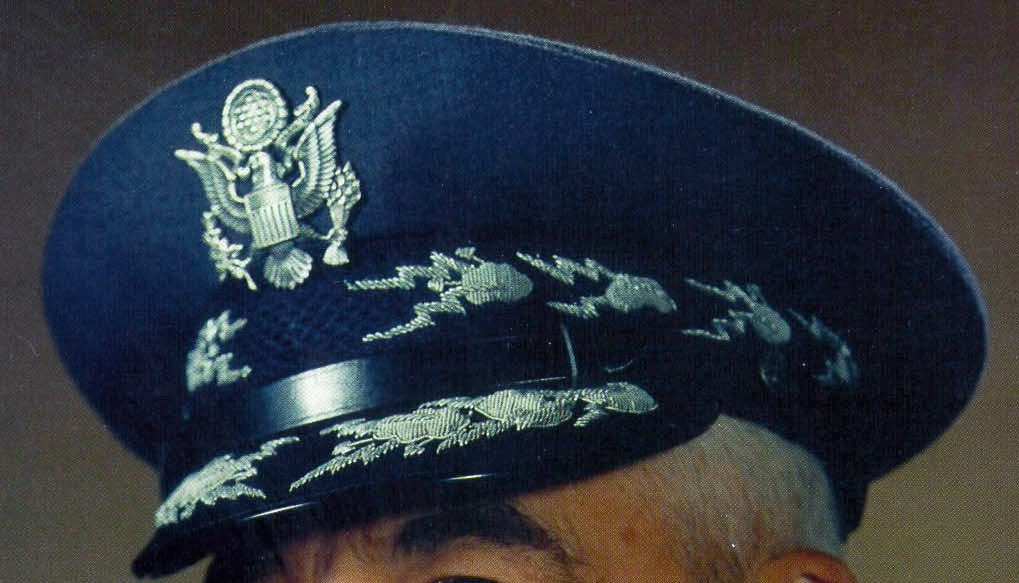
The special uniform cap of the Air Force Chief of Staff. It is also worn by the CJCS, or the VJCS, when either is from the Air Force.

The chief of staff is nominated for appointment by the president, for a four-year term of office, and must be confirmed via majority vote by the Senate. Any Air Force officer with the rank of brigadier general and above may be appointed as chief of staff. Prospective nominees are typically laterally promoted from other four-star assignments. The chief can be reappointed to serve one additional term, but only during times of war or national emergency declared by Congress.

To qualify for the position, the nominee must have significant joint duty experience, and at least one full tour of duty in a joint duty assignment as a general officer, unless the President waives this requirement. By statute, the chief of staff is appointed as a four-star general without vacating his permanent rank.

=== Special uniform cap ===
The chief of staff is authorized to wear a special service cap with clouds and lightning bolts around the band of the hat. This cap is different from those worn by other general officers of the Air Force and it is for use by the Chief of Staff and Air Force officers serving as Chairman or Vice Chairman of the Joint Chiefs of Staff.

== List of chiefs of staff of the Air Force ==
Prior to the creation of this position, General Henry H. Arnold was designated the first chief of the Army Air Forces and commanding general of the Army Air Forces during World War II. His successor, Carl A. Spaatz became the first chief of staff of the Air Force upon the establishment of the United States Air Force.

Four chiefs of staff would go on to serve as chairman of the Joint Chiefs of Staff, namely Nathan F. Twining, George S. Brown, David C. Jones, and Charles Q. Brown Jr.

No.	Portrait	Name	Term			Background	Secretaries served under:		Ref.
No.	Portrait	Name	Took office	Left office	Duration	Background	Air Force	Defense	Ref.
1	Carl A. Spaatz	General; Carl A. Spaatz (1891–1974)	26 September 1947	29 April 1948	216 days	Fighters	Stuart Symington	James Forrestal	
2	Hoyt S. Vandenberg	General; Hoyt S. Vandenberg (1899–1954)	30 April 1948 (Note: Served prior as Vice Chief of Staff of the Air Force.)	29 June 1953	5 years, 60 days	Attack and Fighters	Stuart Symington; Thomas K. Finletter; Harold E. Talbott	James Forrestal; Louis A. Johnson; George C. Marshall; Robert A. Lovett; Charles Erwin Wilson	
3	Nathan F. Twining	General; Nathan F. Twining (1897–1982)	30 June 1953	30 June 1957 (Note: Appointed as Chairman of the Joint Chiefs of Staff.)	4 years, 0 days	Fighters and Bombers	Harold E. Talbott; Donald A. Quarles; James H. Douglas Jr.	Charles Erwin Wilson	
4	Thomas D. White	General; Thomas D. White (1901–1965)	1 July 1957	30 June 1961	3 years, 364 days	Observation aircraft and Staff	James H. Douglas Jr. Dudley Sharp; Eugene Zuckert	Charles Erwin Wilson; Neil H. McElroy; Thomas Gates; Robert McNamara	
5	Curtis E. LeMay	General; Curtis E. LeMay (1906–1990)	30 June 1961	31 January 1965	3 years, 215 days	Bombers	Eugene Zuckert	Robert McNamara	
6	John P. McConnell	General; John P. McConnell (1908–1986)	1 February 1965	31 July 1969	4 years, 180 days	Fighters	Eugene Zuckert; Harold Brown; Robert Seamans	Robert McNamara; Clark Clifford; Melvin Laird	
7	John D. Ryan	General; John D. Ryan (1915–1983)	1 August 1969	31 July 1973	3 years, 364 days	Bombers	Robert Seamans; John L. McLucas	Melvin Laird; Elliot Richardson; James R. Schlesinger	
8	George S. Brown	General; George S. Brown (1918–1978)	1 August 1973	30 June 1974	333 days	Bombers	John L. McLucas	James R. Schlesinger	
9	David C. Jones	General; David C. Jones (1921–2013)	1 July 1974	20 June 1978	3 years, 354 days	Bombers	John L. McLucas; Thomas C. Reed; John C. Stetson	James R. Schlesinger; Donald Rumsfeld; Harold Brown	
10	Lew Allen Jr.	General; Lew Allen Jr. (1925–2010)	1 July 1978	30 June 1982	3 years, 364 days	Bombers	John C. Stetson; Hans Mark; Verne Orr	Harold Brown; Caspar Weinberger	
11	Charles A. Gabriel	General; Charles A. Gabriel (1928–2003)	1 July 1982	30 June 1986	3 years, 364 days	Fighters	Verne Orr; Russell A. Rourke; Edward Aldridge	Caspar Weinberger	
12	Larry D. Welch	General; Larry D. Welch (born 1934)	1 July 1986	30 June 1990	3 years, 364 days	Fighters	Edward Aldridge; Donald Rice	Caspar Weinberger; Frank Carlucci; Dick Cheney	
13	Michael J. Dugan	General; Michael J. Dugan (born 1937)	1 July 1990	17 September 1990 (relieved)	78 days	Fighters	Donald Rice	Dick Cheney	
–	John M. Loh	General; John M. Loh (born 1938); Acting (Note: In capacity as Vice Chief of Staff of the Air Force.)	18 September 1990	29 October 1990	41 days	Fighters	Donald Rice	Dick Cheney	
14	Merrill A. McPeak	General; Merrill A. McPeak (born 1936)	30 October 1990	25 October 1994	3 years, 360 days	Fighters	Donald Rice; Sheila Widnall	Dick Cheney; Les Aspin; William J. Perry	
15	Ronald R. Fogleman	General; Ronald R. Fogleman (born 1942)	26 October 1994	1 September 1997	2 years, 310 days	Fighters	Sheila Widnall	William J. Perry; William Cohen	
–	Ralph E. Eberhart	General; Ralph E. Eberhart (born 1946); Acting	2 September 1997	5 October 1997	33 days	Fighters	Sheila Widnall	William Cohen	
16	Michael E. Ryan	General; Michael E. Ryan (born 1941)	6 October 1997	5 September 2001	3 years, 334 days	Fighters	Sheila Widnall; F. Whitten Peters; James G. Roche	William Cohen; Donald Rumsfeld	
17	John P. Jumper	General; John P. Jumper (born 1945)	6 September 2001	1 September 2005	3 years, 360 days	Fighters	James G. Roche	Donald Rumsfeld	
18	T. Michael Moseley	General; T. Michael Moseley (born 1949)	2 September 2005	11 July 2008 (resigned)	2 years, 344 days	Fighters	Michael Wynne	Donald Rumsfeld; Robert Gates	
–	Duncan J. McNabb	General; Duncan J. McNabb (born 1952); Acting	12 July 2008	12 August 2008	31 days	Airlift	Michael B. Donley	Robert Gates	
19	Norton A. Schwartz	General; Norton A. Schwartz (born 1951)	12 August 2008	10 August 2012	3 years, 364 days	Airlift and Special Operations aircraft	Michael B. Donley	Robert Gates; Leon Panetta	
20	Mark A. Welsh III	General; Mark A. Welsh III (born 1953)	10 August 2012	24 June 2016	3 years, 319 days	Attack and Fighters	Michael B. Donley; Deborah Lee James	Leon Panetta; Chuck Hagel; Ash Carter	
21	David L. Goldfein	General; David L. Goldfein (born 1959)	1 July 2016	6 August 2020	4 years, 36 days	Fighters	Deborah Lee James; Heather Wilson; Barbara Barrett	Ash Carter; Jim Mattis; Mark Esper	
22	Charles Q. Brown Jr.	General; Charles Q. Brown Jr. (born 1962)	6 August 2020	29 September 2023	3 years, 54 days	Fighters	Barbara Barrett; Frank Kendall III	Mark Esper; Lloyd Austin	
–		General; David W. Allvin (born 1963)	29 September 2023	2 November 2023	34 days	Airlift	Frank Kendall III; Troy Meink	Lloyd Austin; Pete Hegseth	
23		General; David W. Allvin (born 1963)	2 November 2023	3 November 2025	2 years, 1 day	Airlift	Frank Kendall III; Troy Meink	Lloyd Austin; Pete Hegseth	
24	Kenneth S. Wilsbach	General; Kenneth S. Wilsbach (born c. 1963)	3 November 2025	Incumbent	343 days	Fighters	Troy Meink	Pete Hegseth	
