= Verne Orr =

American politician and businessman (1916–2008)

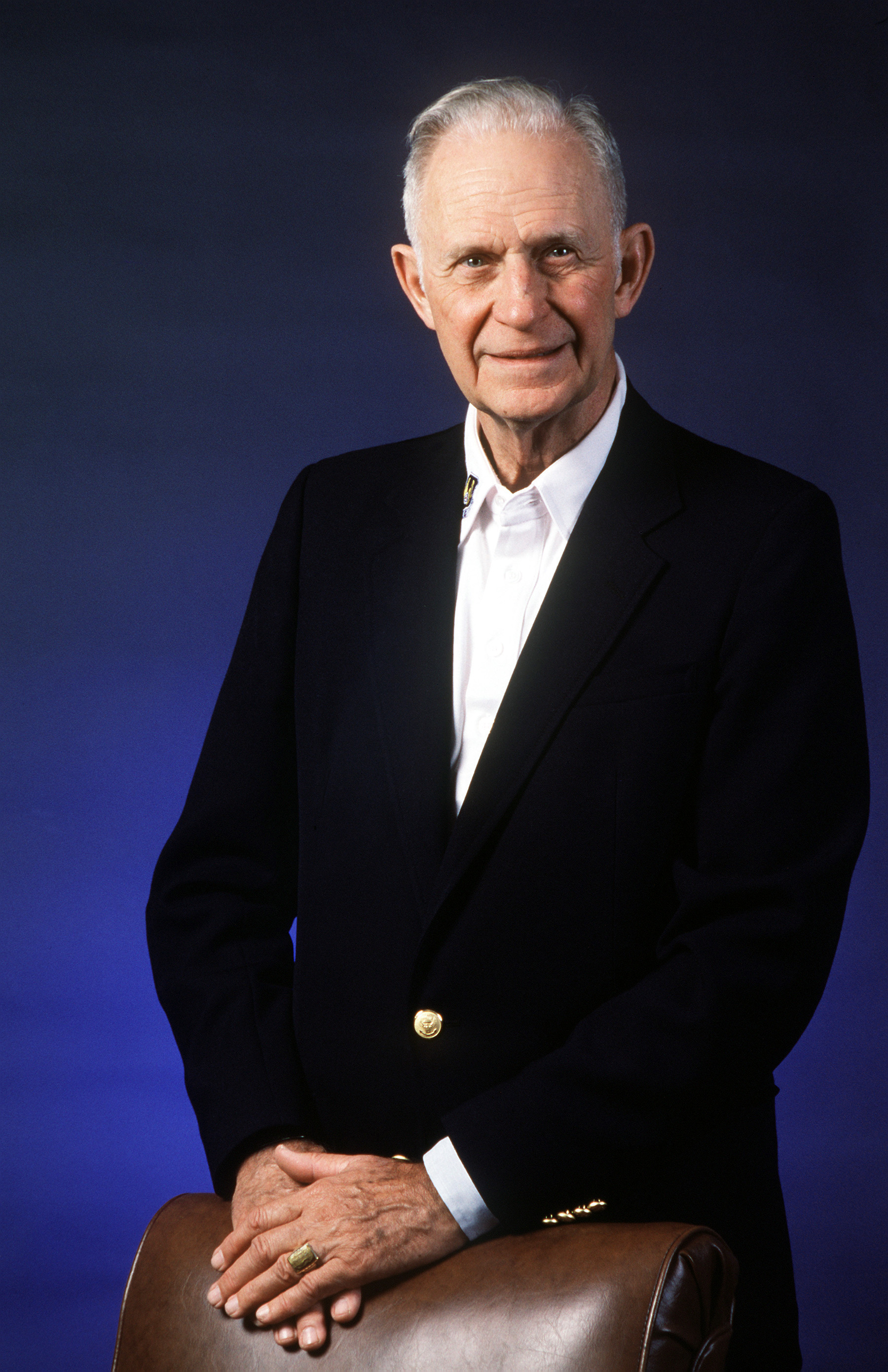

14th United States Secretary of the Air Force
- In office February 9, 1981 – November 30, 1985
- President: Ronald Reagan
- Preceded by: Hans Mark
- Succeeded by: Russell A. Rourke

Director of the California Department of Finance
- In office January 1, 1970 – January 5, 1975
- Governor: Ronald Reagan
- Preceded by: Caspar Weinberger
- Succeeded by: Roy Bell

Personal details
- Born: George Vernon Orr Jr. November 12, 1916 Des Moines, Iowa, U.S.
- Died: November 27, 2008 (aged 92) Pasadena, California, U.S.
- Party: Republican
- Spouse(s): Joan Peak (died 1988) Sarah Smith
- Education: Pomona College (BA); Stanford University (MBA); Claremont Graduate University (PhD)

Military service
- Allegiance: United States
- Branch/service: United States Navy
- Years of service: 1942–1951
- Rank: Lieutenant Commander
- Unit: United States Navy Reserve
- Battles/wars: World War II
- Awards: Purple Heart; Department of Defense Medal for Distinguished Public Service; Army Distinguished Public Service Medal; Navy Distinguished Public Service Award; Department of the Air Force Decoration for Exceptional Civilian Service

George Vernon Orr Jr. (November 12, 1916 – November 27, 2008) was the 14th Secretary of the Air Force, appointed by President Ronald Reagan. From California, he was a businessman and educator who served in both state and national government positions.

== Early life ==
Verne Orr was born on November 12, 1916, in Des Moines, Iowa. He grew up in the Midwest, then moved with his family to California just prior to entering high school.

He graduated from Pomona College in 1937 where he was awarded a Phi Beta Kappa key. He earned a master's degree in business administration from Stanford University in 1939.

Orr served in the United States Navy during World War II. In April 1942, he was called to active duty in the Navy Supply Corps. During the course of the war, Orr served in both the American and Pacific theaters of operations. He reached the rank of lieutenant prior to being released from active duty in November 1945. Orr continued to serve in the Navy Reserve until 1951, when he was honorably discharged as a lieutenant commander.

== Business and public service ==
Following his release from active duty, Orr began working at his father's new car dealership in Pasadena, California, eventually becoming a partner in the business. Orr was active in the auto dealership from 1946 until 1962. However, Orr began shifting his interests into his family's investment business around 1960. In 1963, he became president of Investors Savings and Loan of Pasadena, serving in that position until 1966.

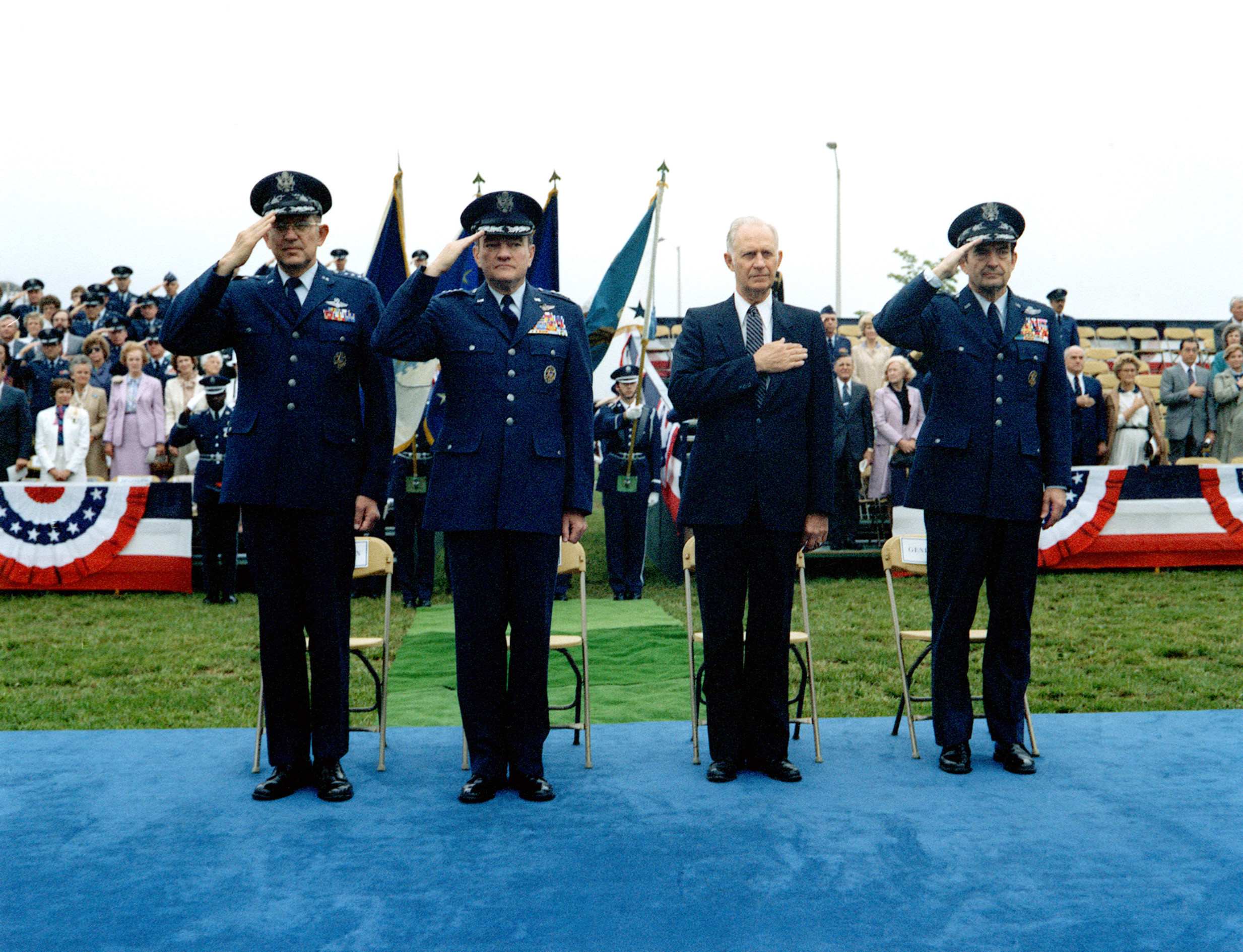
Secretary of The Air Force Verne Orr with Chairman of The Joint Chiefs of Staff General David C. Jones and Air Force Chief of Staff General Lew Allen and Air Force Vice Chief of Staff General Robert C. Mathis at Bolling Air Force Base on May 28, 1982.

In 1966, California's governor, Ronald Reagan, selected Orr to be the director of the state's Department of Motor Vehicles. He held that position until 1969. He then served briefly as the state's director of General Services before becoming California's Director of Finance in 1970, a position he held until 1975.

From 1975 to 1980, Orr taught government finance at the University of Southern California's graduate school of public administration 1975 until 1980. In 1977, California Governor Jerry Brown named him to the University of California's Board of Regents.

In 1980, Orr served on Ronald Reagan's presidential campaign committee. After Reagan was elected president, Orr became deputy director the President-elect's transition office. President Reagan appointed him Secretary of the Air Force in 1981.

As the Air Force Secretary, Orr worked well with Air Force Chief of Staff Charles A. Gabriel. Together they secured major budget increases for the United States Air Force, taking care of Air Force personnel and modernizing the Services's force structure. Orr served for five years, leaving the Air Force in 1985.

After his Air Force service, Orr returned to Pasadena where he became a partner in Smith Orr & Associates, a planning and management consulting firm. In 1999, Orr accepted the position of dean at the University of La Verne's School of Business and International Studies. He served as dean the university until June 2002 when he retired as dean emeritus.

In 2005, after working on his dissertation for 14 years, Orr was award a doctor of philosophy degree in politics and public policy from Claremont Graduate University. At the time, he was 88 years old. His doctoral dissertation was on the development of the B-1 bomber, a system he helped to procure as Secretary of the Air Force.

== Legacy ==
Orr died on November 27, 2008, at age 92, at his home in Pasadena, California.

Orr has had a long and distinguished career in business, government and education including numerous awards. Orr was honored as Pasadena's Man of the Year in 1970. He has also been Pasadena's Salvation Army Man of the Year, and received Pasadena's Patriot Award. He has served as president of the Pasadena Merchants Association, president of the United Way of Los Angeles County, president of the Kiwanis Club of Pasadena, and president of the Family's Services Association of Pasadena. He is director emeritus of Huntington Memorial Hospital in Pasadena.

At the state level, Orr was a University of California Regent and a Trustee of Scripps College in Claremont, California. He was also a member of the Advisory Council for the Florida A&M University-Florida State University, College of Engineering.

Orr's personal awards includes the Purple Heart, Department of Defense Distinguished Public Service Medal, United States Air Force Exceptional Civilian Service Medal, United States Army Distinguished Civilian Service Medal, and Navy Distinguished Civilian Service Award.

The University of La Verne has establishment of the Verne Orr Endowed Scholarship Fund. The fund honors Orr's legacy of leadership and service by awarding an annual scholarship to a qualified and deserving student in the university's School of Business and Global Studies.

Each year the United States Air Force Association present the Verne Orr Award. This award recognizes a United States Air Force unit for making the most effective use of its human resources.

=== Military and civilian service awards ===

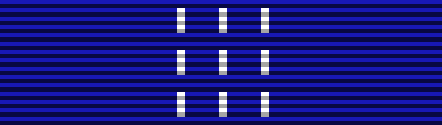

1st Row	Purple Heart	Department of Defense Medal for Distinguished Public Service	Department of the Air Force Decoration for Exceptional Civilian Service
2nd Row	Army Distinguished Civilian Service Medal	Navy Distinguished Civilian Service Medal	American Campaign Medal
3rd Row	Asiatic–Pacific Campaign Medal	World War II Victory Medal	Tongil Medal (통일장); Order of National Security Merit (South Korea)
