= John Stetson =

John Stetson may refer to:

- John B. Stetson (1830–1906), hat manufacturer
- John C. Stetson (1920–2007), U.S. Secretary of the Air Force
