= Alexander H. Flax =

American aeronautical engineer and government official

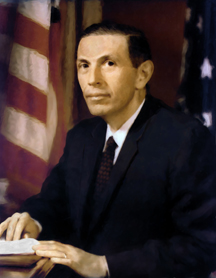

3rd Director of the National Reconnaissance Office
- In office October 1, 1965 – March 17, 1969
- President: Lyndon B. Johnson; Richard Nixon
- Preceded by: Brockway McMillan
- Succeeded by: John L. McLucas

Personal details
- Born: January 18, 1921 Brooklyn, New York, US
- Died: June 30, 2014 (aged 93) Potomac, Maryland, US
- Spouse: Ida Leane
- Children: 1
- Education: New York University; University at Buffalo
- Occupation: aeronautical engineer, government official
- Awards: Department of the Air Force Decoration for Exceptional Civilian Service (1961, 1969); NASA Distinguished Service Medal (1968); Defense Intelligence Agency Exceptional Civilian Service Medal (1974); Department of Defense Distinguished Civilian Service Award (1983)

Alexander Henry Flax (January 18, 1921 – June 30, 2014) was the Chief Scientist of the U.S. Air Force (USAF) from 1959 to 1961, Assistant Secretary of the Air Force for Research and Development from 1963 to 1969, and the third Director of the National Reconnaissance Office (NRO) from 1965 to 1969. He was the director at a time when the second generation of imaging systems became operational and began to play a major role in United States intelligence during the Cold War. He oversaw major growth in NRO funding and personnel, the development of signals intelligence collectors from space, and the development of electro-optical imaging for US reconnaissance satellites.

== Early life ==
Alexander Henry Flax was born in Brooklyn, New York, on January 18, 1921, the son of David Flax, a businessman, and Etta Flax. He had a sister, Shirley. He was interested in science from an early age, reading magazines like Popular Mechanics. He had a particular interest in aviation, and built model aircraft from balsa wood. He entered New York University in 1937, where he studied aeronautical engineering, and received his Bachelor of Science degree in 1940.

== World War II ==
Flax participated in the Reserve Officer Training Corps (ROTC) at New York University, but did not receive a commission on graduation. World War II had already begun, and the aircraft industry needed aeronautical engineers, which was therefore a reserved occupation. Instead, he joined the Curtiss-Wright Corporation after graduation. Within two years he became head of its flutter and vibration group, working on structural and dynamics issues, and on methods for design analysis and testing.

This field was transformed by the advent of the electronic strain gauge, which provided dynamic readouts of stresses and strains that previously had been the subject of theoretical analysis or painstaking laboratory experimentation. Flax was at the forefront of applying the new technology to the aircraft under development at Curtiss-Wright, such as the O-52 Owl observation aircraft, P-40 Warhawk fighter, C-46 Commando transport, and SB2C Helldiver dive bomber.

In 1944, Flax accepted an offer to join the Piasecki Helicopter Corporation as its head of aerodynamics, structures, and weights—a position normally occupied in a larger company by a senior engineer. Helicopter technology was still in its infancy at the time, and Flax had to develop the means to design and test this new type of aircraft. He was part of a small team of engineers who developed the Piasecki HRP Rescuer, the first true tandem rotor helicopter.

== Postwar ==
=== Cornell Aeronautical Laboratory ===
After the war ended, Flax was offered a position as assistant head of the Aeromechanics Department at the Cornell Aeronautical Laboratory in Buffalo, New York. Here, he continued his work on helicopters, particularly the study of blade dynamics and stability. Along with his associate Harold Hirsch, he developed and tested a fiberglass composite material rotor blade. He also became involved in the development of supersonic ramjet propulsion in collaboration with the Applied Physics Laboratory at Johns Hopkins University. He developed the perforated-wall wind tunnel for testing transonic flows, making use of electronic gauges to study this phenomenon. He was also one of the inventors of the wave superheater, which can generate airflows at temperatures hitherto attained only in rocket exhausts.

Flax became head of the Aeromechanics Department in 1949, and Assistant Director of the Cornell Aeronautical Laboratory in 1955. He also served as its Vice President and Technical Director from 1961 to 1963. As such, he exercised managerial and technical guidance over all the work of the laboratory. Not all of this was related to aeronautics; projects included research into neural networks; the design of automobile safety features such as seat belts and crumple zones; pioneering work; and development of weather radar. In 1951, he married Ida Leane, who had served as an Army cryptanalyst during World War II, and worked at Piasecki as a mathematician. They had one child, a daughter called Laurel.

In addition, Flax served on various boards and commissions, including the National Commission on Aerodynamics from 1952 to 1954, its subcommittee on high-speed aerodynamics from 1954 to 1958, and the National Aeronautics and Space Administration (NASA) Advisory Commission on aircraft aerodynamics from 1958 to 1962, and earned a PhD in physics from the University of Buffalo in 1958, writing his thesis on "Approximate methods for the calculation of the scattering of particles by atoms and nuclei".

=== United States Air Force ===
Flax served as the Chief Scientist of the U.S. Air Force (USAF) from 1959 to 1961, and the Assistant Secretary of the Air Force for Research and Development from 1963 to 1969. As assistant secretary, he promoted advanced aircraft engine development through the Lightweight Engine Gas Generator Program and Advanced Turbine Engine Gas Generator Program, which developed engines that eventually went into the McDonnell Douglas F-15 Eagle and the General Dynamics F-16 Fighting Falcon fighter aircraft, and a new generation of high-bypass engines for large, long-range transport aircraft. Based on his experience with fiberglass helicopter blades, he championed the use of composite materials. He also supported the development of precision-guided weapons and their targeting systems and sensors.

Space systems also fell within Flax's area of responsibility, and he oversaw the deployment of the Missile Defense Alarm System (MiDAS) space-based infrared sensor system for ballistic missile launch detection, the development of the Titan III family of launch vehicles, and the evolution of the early defense communications satellite systems including the Defense Satellite Communications System (DSCS), TACSATCOM, and the Global Positioning System.

Flax concurrently served as the third director of the National Reconnaissance Office (NRO) from October 1, 1965, until March 17, 1969. In this role he oversaw major growth in NRO funding and personnel, and the production of signals intelligence collectors from space and promoted the development of real-time electro-optical imaging systems for reconnaissance satellites. He canceled short-lived low Earth orbit satellites in favor of longer-lived, more cost-effective ones in higher orbits with modules for returning film to Earth like the KH-8 Gambit 3 and KH-9 Hexagon. In the process, the NRO's signal intelligence share of the National Reconnaissance Program budget rose from 5 to 30 percent.

== Later life ==
In March 1969, Flax joined the Institute for Defense Analyses (IDA), initially as its vice president of research, becoming its president later that year. The IDA helped the Office of the Secretary of Defense and the Joint Chiefs of Staff develop analytical and computer models to evaluate conventional and nuclear forces, through such projects as the Air Combat Evaluation (ACEVAL) and the Air Intercept Missile Evaluation (AIMVAL) respectively. It also assisted in coordinating and evaluating technology-based Department of Defense programs like those involved with infrared sensors, new materials, and novel propulsion technologies. He retired in 1983.

Flax was a consultant to the Defense Science Board from 1974 to 1987, and President's Intelligence Advisory Board from 1982 to 1987. He was a member of the United States Air Force Scientific Advisory Board, and the Federal Emergency Management Agency advisory board, and the chairman of the Defense Intelligence Agency (DIA) advisory committee. He was also a member of the National Research Council Panel on the Impact of National Security Controls on International Technology Transfer from 1985 to 1987, Committee on a Commercially Developed Space Facility from 1988 to 1989, and Committee on NASA Scientific and Technological Program Reviews from 1981 to 1993.

Over the years Flax received many awards and accolades, including the Department of the Air Force Decoration for Exceptional Civilian Service in 1961 and 1969, the NASA Distinguished Service Medal in 1968, the Defense Intelligence Agency Exceptional Civilian Service Medal in 1974, and the Department of Defense Distinguished Civilian Service Award in 1983. He also received the Theodore von Karman award from the NATO Advisory Group for Aerospace Research and Development, the Lawrence Sperry Award from American Institute of Aeronautics and Astronautics, the Clifford Furnas Award from the State University of New York at Buffalo and the National Geographic Society's General Thomas D. White USAF Space Trophy.

Flax died on June 30, 2014.
