= Jeffrey K. Harris =

American aerospace executive

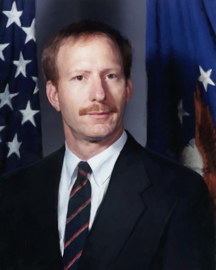

11th Director of the National Reconnaissance Office
- In office May 19, 1994 – February 26, 1996
- President: Bill Clinton
- Preceded by: Martin C. Faga
- Succeeded by: Keith R. Hall

Personal details
- Born: June 28, 1953 (age 73) White Plains, New York, US
- Education: Rochester Institute of Technology

Jeffrey King Harris (born June 28, 1953) is an American aerospace executive who served as 11th director of the National Reconnaissance Office from 1994 to 1996. Currently, he is the chairman of the RIT Board of Trustees.

== Life and career ==
Harris was born in White Plains, New York in 1953 and graduated from Rumson-Fair Haven Regional High School in 1971. He attended from Rochester Institute of Technology, earning an associate's degree in applied sciences in 1974 and a B.S. degree in photographic science and instrumentation in 1975. Harris then went to work for the Central Intelligence Agency. In 1978, he transferred from the National Photographic Intelligence Center to The Office of Development and Engineering.

== Time at NRO ==
Mr. Harris managed the integration of NRO programs into three functional directorates. He was a member of the R. James Woolsey panel that studied the future of NRO systems. He was a major proponent and architect of consolidating signals intelligence systems in a new partnership with the National Security Agency. Mr. Harris directed the CORONA program declassification and established a public affairs program.

Harris and deputy director Jimmie D. Hill were dismissed in 1996 after losing track of more than $2 billion in classified money. Harris was replaced by Keith Hall.

== Post-government career ==
Harris was named president of the Space Systems-Missiles & Space Operations division of Lockheed Martin in 2001.

As of 2024, Harris serves on the advisory board of the National Security Space Association.
