= Leadership of the National Reconnaissance Office =

U.S. military management position

The director of the National Reconnaissance Office (DNRO) of the United States is responsible to the secretary of defense (through the under secretary of defense for intelligence) and the director of national intelligence (DNI) for all national space and assigned airborne reconnaissance activities. The DNRO provides top-level management direction to the NRO in response to secretary of defense and director of national intelligence requirements.

== Chronological list of National Reconnaissance Office directors ==
This is a list of directors of the NRO, and the terms in office.

Photo	Name	Term of Office	Presidential Administration(s)	Significant events
	Dr. Richard M. Bissell, Jr.	September 1961 – February 1962	Kennedy	Co-director with Dr. Charyk
	Dr. Joseph V. Charyk	September 6, 1961 – March 1, 1963	Kennedy	First NRO co-director
	Dr. Brockway McMillan	March 1, 1963 – October 1, 1965	Kennedy/Johnson	
	Dr. Alexander H. Flax	October 1, 1965 – March 17, 1969	Johnson	
	Dr. John L. McLucas	March 17, 1969 – December 20, 1973	Nixon	
	Mr. James W. Plummer	December 21, 1973 – June 28, 1976	Nixon/Ford	
	Mr. Thomas C. Reed	August 9, 1976 – April 7, 1977	Ford/Carter	
	Dr. Hans Mark	August 3, 1977 – October 7, 1979	Carter	
	Dr. Robert J. Hermann	October 8, 1979 – August 2, 1981	Carter/Reagan	
	Mr. Edward (Pete) C. Aldridge, Jr.	August 3, 1981 – December 16, 1988	Reagan	
	Mr. Martin C. Faga	September 28, 1989 – March 5, 1993	Bush/Clinton	Declassification of NRO
	Mr. Jeffrey K. Harris	May 19, 1994 – February 26, 1996	Clinton	Declassification of CORONA/ARGON/LANYARD
	Mr. Keith R. Hall	March 28, 1997 – December 13, 2001	Clinton/Bush	September 11, 2001 attacks
	Mr. Peter B. Teets	December 2001 – March 2005	Bush	
	Dr. Donald M. Kerr	July 2005 – October 5, 2007	Bush	
	Mr. Scott F. Large	October 19, 2007 – April 18, 2009	Bush/Obama	
	General Bruce Carlson, USAF (Ret.)	June 12, 2009 – July 20, 2012	Obama	
	Ms. Betty J. Sapp	July 20, 2012 – April 4, 2019	Obama/Trump	First woman NRO Director
	Dr. Christopher Scolese	August 5, 2019 – July 10, 2026	Trump/Biden/Trump	First presidentially-appointed and Senate-confirmed NRO Director
	Roger Mason	August 17, 2026 – Present	Donald Trump	

== List of Deputy Directors of National Reconnaissance Office ==
No.	Deputy Director		Term		
No.	Portrait	Name	Took office	Left office	Term length
1	John T. Sheridan	Major General; John T. Sheridan	31 July 2006	16 May 2008	1 year, 290 days
2	Ellen M. Pawlikowski	Major General; Ellen M. Pawlikowski (born 1956)	June 2008	January 2010	~1 year, 214 days
3	Susan K. Mashiko	Major General; Susan K. Mashiko	January 2010	June 2013	~3 years, 151 days
4	Anthony J. Cotton	Major General; Anthony J. Cotton	June 2013	6 November 2015	~2 years, 144 days
5	Stephen Denker	Major General; Stephen Denker	18 November 2015	1 June 2018	2 years, 195 days
6	Mark Baird	Brigadier General; Mark Baird (1965–2023)	25 June 2018	December 2018	~173 days
7	Michael Guetlein	Major General; Michael Guetlein (born 1967)	8 July 2019	9 August 2021	2 years, 32 days
8	Donna D. Shipton	Major General; Donna D. Shipton (born c. 1970)	9 August 2021	19 August 2022	1 year, 10 days
9	Christopher Povak	Major General; Christopher Povak (born 1970)	9 September 2022	6 November 2026	4 years, 58 days
10	Robert Schreiner	Brigadier General; Robert Schreiner (born c. 1976)	6 November 2026	Incumbent	11 days

== See also ==
- Under Secretary of the Air Force
