= Martin C. Faga =

American government official (1941–2023)

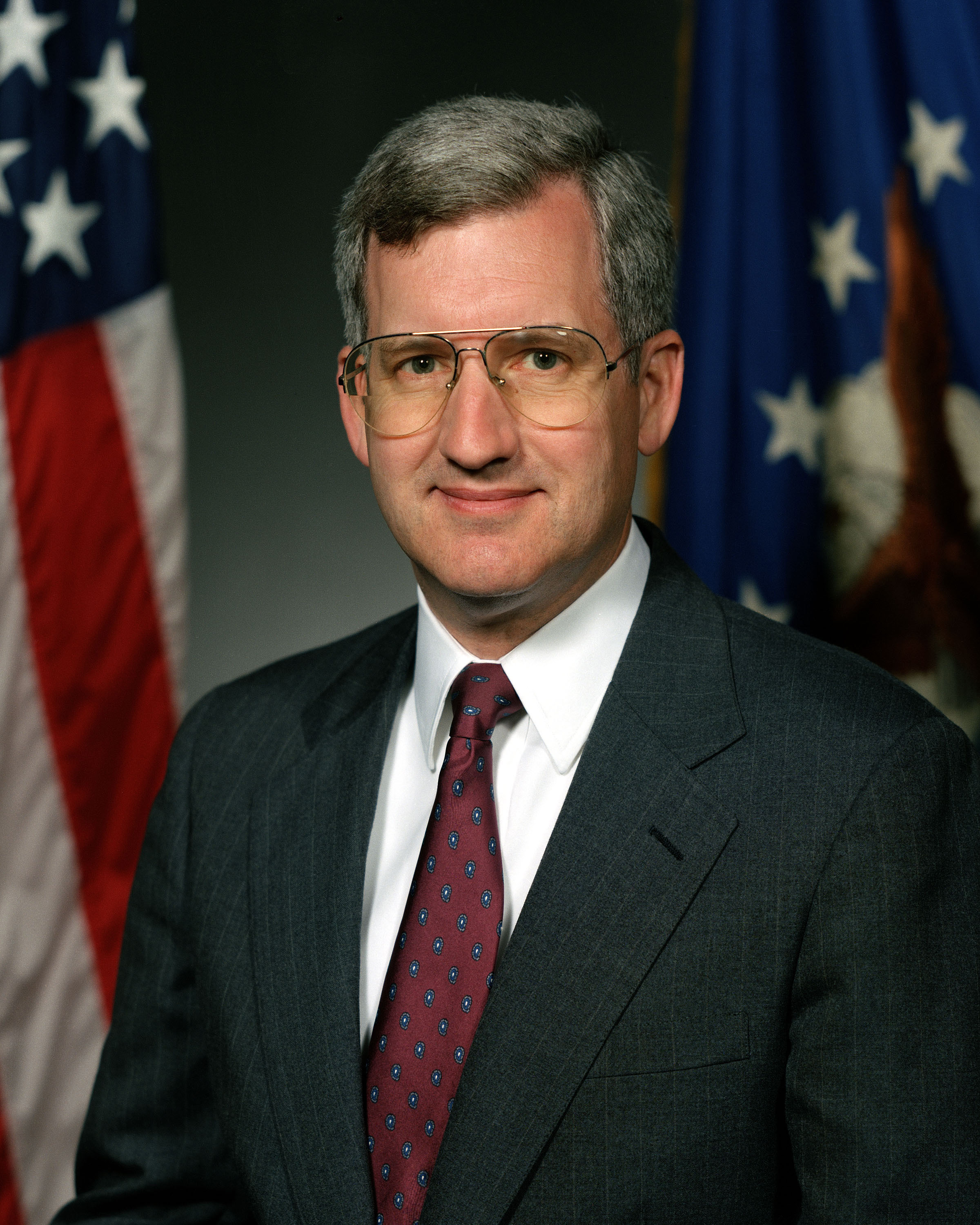

10th Director of the National Reconnaissance Office
- In office September 28, 1989 – March 5, 1993
- President: George H. W. Bush; Bill Clinton
- Preceded by: Edward C. Aldridge Jr.
- Succeeded by: Jeffrey K. Harris

Personal details
- Born: July 11, 1941 Bethlehem, Pennsylvania, U.S.
- Died: October 19, 2023 (aged 82) Falls Church, Virginia, U.S.

Martin Clark Faga (June 11, 1941 - October 19, 2023) was the tenth director of the National Reconnaissance Office (DNRO).

Faga directed the declassification of the existence of the NRO following more than 30-years of secrecy. He revolutionized NRO support to the military, downgraded NRO products' classification, and appointed a deputy director for military support. Faga initiated the transition from separate Central Intelligence Agency, Air Force, and Navy programs into functional directorates of signals, imagery, and communications.

Born and raised in Bethlehem, Pennsylvania, Faga graduated from Liberty High School in June 1959. He then attended Lehigh University, graduating with a B.S. degree in electrical engineering in June 1963 and then earning an M.S. degree in electrical engineering in October 1964.

Faga began work at MITRE in 1969 as a member of the technical staff in the field of remote sensors. In 1972, he joined the CIA, where he worked on advanced systems for intelligence collection by technical means. He became a member of the professional staff of the Permanent Select Committee on Intelligence of the U.S. House of Representatives in 1977, assigned to the Program and Budget Authorization Subcommittee. In 1984, Faga became head of the staff assigned to the subcommittee. His responsibilities included staff oversight of technical collection programs and coordination of all subcommittee work.

Faga concurrently served as Assistant Secretary of the Air Force for Space from 1989 to 1993, having been confirmed by the U.S. Senate on September 22, 1989.

Following retirement from government service in 1993, he joined MITRE Corporation as a vice president, rising to be the president and CEO. He retired from MITRE in 2006. He remained on MITRE's board of directors, and served on numerous other boards and commissions.

Faga is a Fellow of the National Academy of Public Administration.

Faga died at the age of 82 on October 19, 2023 in Falls Church, Virginia.

Business positions
Preceded by Victor DeMarines	President of MITRE; 2000 – 2006	Succeeded by Alfred Grasso
