= Edward C. Aldridge Jr. =

American politician

Pete Aldridge
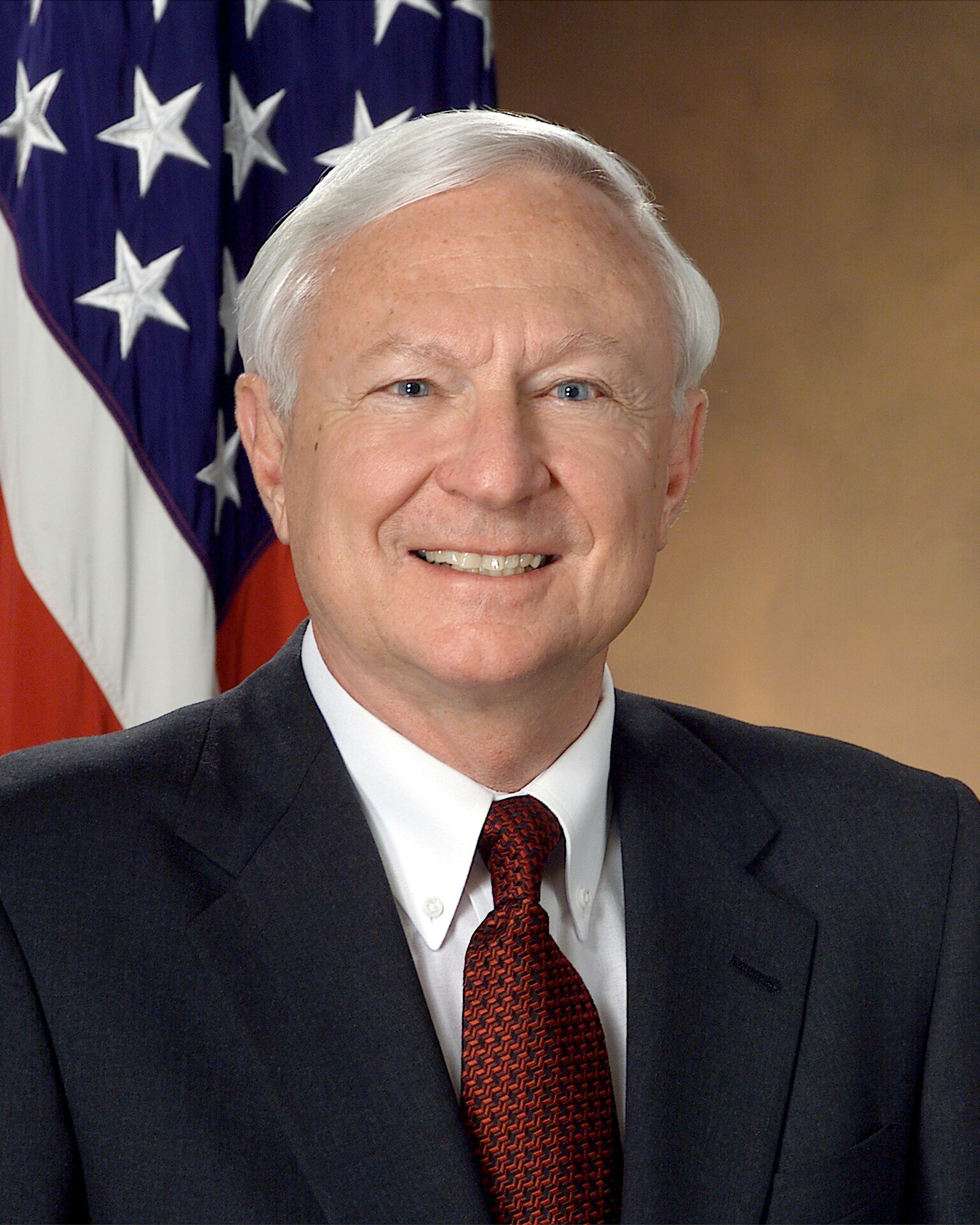

Under Secretary of Defense for Acquisition, Technology and Logistics
- In office May 10, 2001 – May 23, 2003
- President: George W. Bush
- Preceded by: Russell A. Rourke
- Succeeded by: Kenneth J. Krieg

16th United States Secretary of the Air Force
- In office April 6, 1986 – December 16, 1988; Acting: April 6, 1986 – June 8, 1986
- President: Ronald Reagan
- Preceded by: Russell A. Rourke
- Succeeded by: Donald Rice

Director of the National Reconnaissance Office
- In office August 3, 1981 – December 16, 1988
- President: Ronald Reagan
- Preceded by: Robert J. Hermann
- Succeeded by: Martin C. Faga

United States Under Secretary of the Air Force
- In office August 3, 1981 – June 9, 1986
- President: Ronald Reagan
- Preceded by: Antonia Handler Chayes
- Succeeded by: James F. McGovern

Personal details
- Born: Edward Cleveland Aldridge Jr. August 18, 1938 (age 88) Houston, Texas, U.S.
- Party: Republican
- Education: Texas A&M University, College Station (BS); Georgia Institute of Technology (MS)

Edward Cleveland "Pete" Aldridge Jr. (born August 18, 1938) is an aerospace engineer and former government official in the U.S. Defense Department. He was also selected as a payload specialist for the Space Shuttle mission STS-62-A, scheduled to launch in July 1986. The mission was canceled after the Space Shuttle Challenger disaster in January 1986, and Aldridge never flew.

At the Department of Defense in the 1980s, Aldridge served as the Under Secretary of the Air Force from 1981 to 1986, Director of the National Reconnaissance Office 1981–1988, and the Secretary of the Air Force from 1986 to 1988. Under President George W. Bush, he was the Under Secretary of Defense for Acquisition, Technology and Logistics from 2001 to 2003.

From 1989 to 1992 he was president of the Electronic Systems Company division of McDonnell Douglas, and later, CEO of The Aerospace Corporation.

== Early life and education ==
Edward Cleveland Aldridge Jr. was born in Houston, Texas, the son of Lillie Idell (Née Radford) and Edward Cleveland Aldridge. Aldridge received a Bachelor of Science in aeronautical engineering from Texas A&M University in 1960 and a Master of Science from the Georgia Institute of Technology.

== Career ==
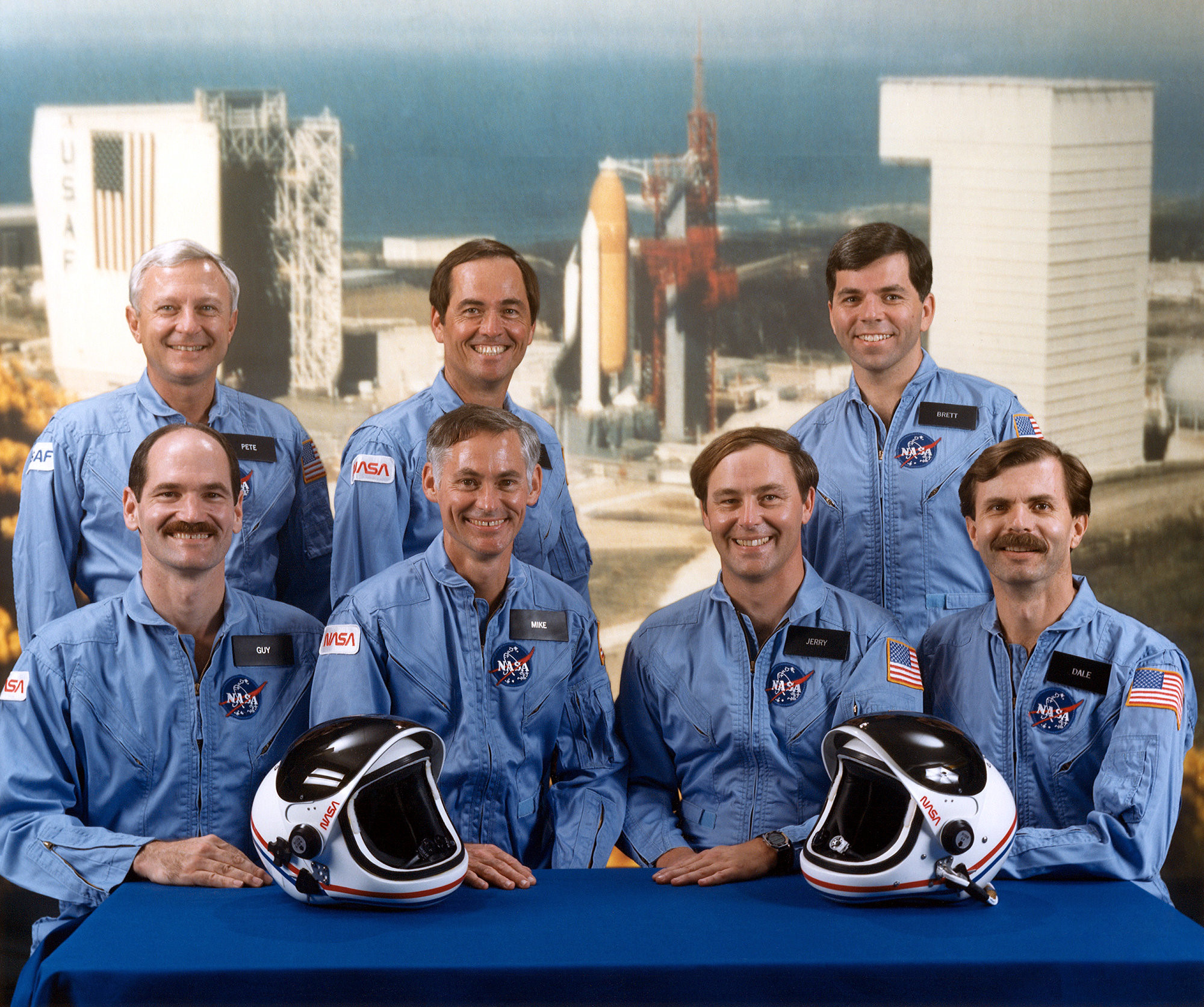
STS-62-A crew portrait, with Aldridge (left, back row)

Aldridge played a key role in the late stages of the U.S.'s Cold War with the Union of Soviet Socialist Republics (USSR) by ensuring continued U.S. military access to space. From 1981 to 1988, he served as Director of the National Reconnaissance Office—the U.S. Government agency in charge of designing, building, launching, and maintaining America's intelligence satellites. Uncomfortable with the U.S.'s sole dependence during that time on the Space Shuttle for launch of heavy systems, he initiated a second launcher, the Titan IV, from Martin Marietta with an order for 10 vehicles in 1985. When the Space Shuttle Challenger exploded during its launch the following year, the U.S. military was able to continue its assured access to space despite the Space Shuttle's two year grounding.

Aldridge was confirmed as the Pentagon's top weapons buyer on May 8, 2001. As the Under Secretary of Defense for Acquisition, Technology and Logistics, he had responsibility for acquisition, research and development, logistics, advanced technology, international programs, environmental security, nuclear, chemical, and biological programs, and the industrial base.

In 2002, during his time as Under Secretary of Defense for Acquisition, Technology and Logistics, he authorized the acquisition of the F-35's before critical developmental testing was finished and stated the F-35 was "setting new standards for technological advances" and "rewriting the books on acquisition and business practices." His successor voiced a different opinion in 2012. "This will make a headline if I say it, but I'm going to say it anyway," Frank Kendall said. "Putting the F-35 into production years before the first test flight was acquisition malpractice. It should not have been done." As of 2012, the military has spent $373 million to fix planes already bought; the ultimate repair bill for imperfect planes has been estimated at close to $8 billion.

He served in a variety of jobs, including:

- Secretary of the Air Force
- President of McDonnell Douglass Electronic Systems Company
- President and CEO of The Aerospace Corporation
- Adviser to the Strategic Arms Limitation Talks in Helsinki and Vienna
- Senior manager with the LTV Aerospace Corp.,
- Senior management associate in the U.S. Office of Management and Budget
- Deputy Assistant Defense Secretary for Strategic Programs
- Vice President of National Policy and Strategic Systems Group for the System Planning Corporation
- Air Force Undersecretary for guiding and supervising the National Reconnaissance Office and the Air Force space program

== Affiliations ==
Affiliations included:

- President and Fellow of the American Institute of Aeronautics and Astronautics
- Member, Defense Science Board
- Member, National Academy of Engineering
- National director, Air Force Association
- Member of the board of directors of the United States Air Force Academy Foundation

== Awards ==
- Department of Defense Distinguished Civilian Service Award
- Secretary of Defense Meritorious Civilian Service Award
- Department of Defense Distinguished Public Service Award

In 2005, Aldridge received the General James E. Hill Lifetime Space Achievement Award, by the Space Foundation. The award is in recognition for individuals who have made substantial contributions to space technology, information, themes, or resources.

Government offices
Preceded by Antonia Handler Chayes	United States Under Secretary of the Air Force; 1981–1986	Succeeded by James F. McGovern
Preceded by Robert J. Hermann	Director of the National Reconnaissance Office; 1981–1988	Succeeded by Martin C. Faga
Preceded by Russell A. Rourke	United States Secretary of the Air Force; 1986–1988	Succeeded by James F. McGovern; Acting
Preceded by Jacques Gansler	Under Secretary of Defense for Acquisition, Technology and Logistics; 2001–2003	Succeeded by Michael W. Wynne; Acting
