= Donald Rice =

Seventeenth Secretary of the U.S. Air Force

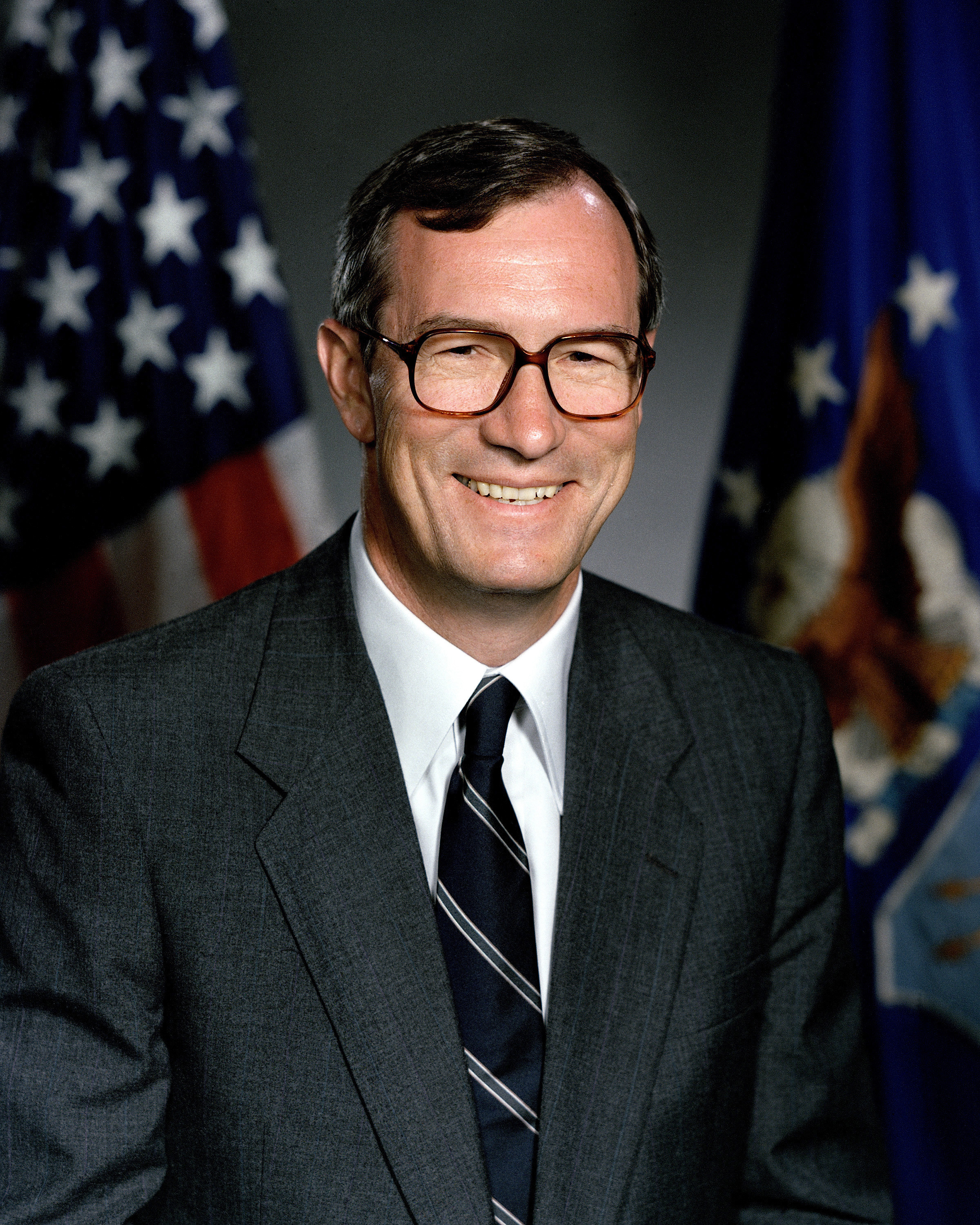

17th United States Secretary of the Air Force
- In office May 22, 1989 – January 20, 1993
- President: George H. W. Bush
- Preceded by: Edward C. Aldridge Jr.
- Succeeded by: Sheila Widnall

Personal details
- Born: Donald Blessing Rice; June 4, 1939 (age 87) Frederick, Maryland, U.S.
- Party: Republican
- Education: University of Notre Dame (BS); Purdue University, West Lafayette (MS, PhD)

Military service
- Allegiance: United States
- Branch/service: United States Army
- Years of service: 1961–1967
- Unit: Army Ordnance Corps

Donald Blessing Rice, Jr. (born June 4, 1939) is an American businessman and senior government official. He has been president and chief executive officer of several large companies, including RAND Corporation, and has sat on numerous boards of directors, including Wells Fargo & Company. Rice also served as the 17th secretary of the Air Force, from 1989 to 1993.

== Early life ==
Rice was born in 1939 in Frederick, Maryland, the son of Donald B. Rice Sr., and Mary C. Rice. His father operated a service station, and later started a tire business, eventually becoming mayor of Frederick, while his mother kept the books for the family business. Both parents stressed the need for a good education. Business, public service and education were all important influences on Rice as he grew up.

Rice earned a BS degree in chemical engineering from the University of Notre Dame in 1961, a MS in industrial management from Purdue University in 1962, and a Ph.D. in economics also from Purdue University in 1965. He was commissioned a second lieutenant in the United States Army Ordnance Corps upon graduation from Notre Dame in June 1961.

On August 25, 1962, Rice married Susan Fitzgerald. The couple are the parents of three sons, Donald B. Rice III, Joseph J. Rice, and Matthew F. Rice.

== Public service ==
After four years of graduate school while in the U. S. Army Reserves, from 1965 to 1967, he served on active duty as a lieutenant and then captain of ordnance. During that time, he was assistant professor of management and acting deputy director for academics at the Navy Management Systems Center in the Naval Postgraduate School at Monterey, California.

In 1967, Rice became director of cost analysis in the Office of the Secretary of Defense in Washington, D.C. Two years later, he was appointed as deputy assistant secretary of defense for resource analysis. He was responsible for cost analysis, manpower and logistics requirements, and budget planning for defense programs. From 1970 to 1972, he served as assistant director in the Office of Management and Budget. In this position, he managed Federal Government budget activities for agriculture, atomic energy, commerce, energy, environment, natural resources, public works, science and technology, space, and transportation.

In 1972, Rice became president and chief executive officer of RAND Corporation, an independent, nonprofit, public service think tank in Santa Monica, California. RAND conducts research and strategic analysis on national security and other public policy issues and offers a doctoral degree program in public policy analysis. During this time, Rice also was appointed by President Ford to serve as chairman of the National Commission on Supplies and Shortages, and by Presidents Nixon and Carter to two terms on the National Science Board. At the request of President Carter, he directed a comprehensive study of the resources management process within the United States Department of Defense.

He remained at RAND until May 1989 when President George H. W. Bush appointed him Secretary of the Air Force. As the Air Force Secretary, Rice reorganized the Air Force and reduced its budget. The first Gulf War, also known as "Desert Storm", was fought while he was secretary. Rice served for four years, from May 22, 1989, until he left the Department of the Air Force on January 20, 1993.

Rice has been president of the Institute of Management Sciences, a member of the American Association for the Advancement of Science, the American Economic Association, and a fellow of the National Academy of Public Administration. He was appointed by President Clinton to the United States Commission on National Strategy in the 21st Century.

He has contributed to McCain 2000, George W. Bush for President, Bush-Cheney '04, John McCain 2008, the National Republican Congressional Committee, and the National Republican Senatorial Committee.

== Business career ==
After he left the Air Force, Rice became president and chief operating officer of Teledyne in March 1993, serving until August 1996. After helping lead a restructuring of the company and a negotiated merger with Allegheny Ludlum, he left Teledyne to become founding president and chief executive officer of Agensys Corporation (founded in 1997 and formerly called Urogenesys), a Santa Monica-based biotechnology company. In 2002, he became chairman of the Agensys board of directors. In 2007, he negotiated the sale of Agensys to Astellas, Inc., continuing as its CEO until his retirement in 2010.

Rice has served on numerous corporate boards. These include Chevron Corporation, Pacific Enterprises, Scios, Teledyne, Wells Fargo & Company, Unocal, Amgen, and Vulcan Materials Company. He was chairman of the board of directors of Scios from 1998 until its sale to Johnson & Johnson in 2003. Rice is an emeritus member of RAND board of trustees, and chaired the board of governors for the Pardee RAND Graduate School for 10 years. He is also a member of the equipment advisory committee for the PGA Tour.

== Awards ==
Rice has received five honorary doctorate degrees. His first was a doctorate in Engineering from Notre Dame in 1975; his second, in Management, was from Purdue in 1985; he received a third, in Laws, from Pepperdine in 1989; the fourth was in Humane Letters, from West Coast University in 1993; and the most recent, in Public Policy, from the RAND graduate school in 1995.

In 1999, Rice received the Wanner Award from the Military Operations Research Society. Other awards include the Citation Award from the University of California at Los Angeles School of Engineering and Applied Sciences, the Air Force Association's Symington Award, and the Jaycees' Ten Outstanding Young Men recognition. He is a Ford Foundation doctoral fellow. Rice was also awarded the Distinguished Civilian Service Medal and the Meritorious Service Medal from the Secretary of Defense.

He was elected to the 2002 class of fellows of the Institute for Operations Research and the Management Sciences.
