= James E. Hill =

United States Air Force general

James Erskine Hill
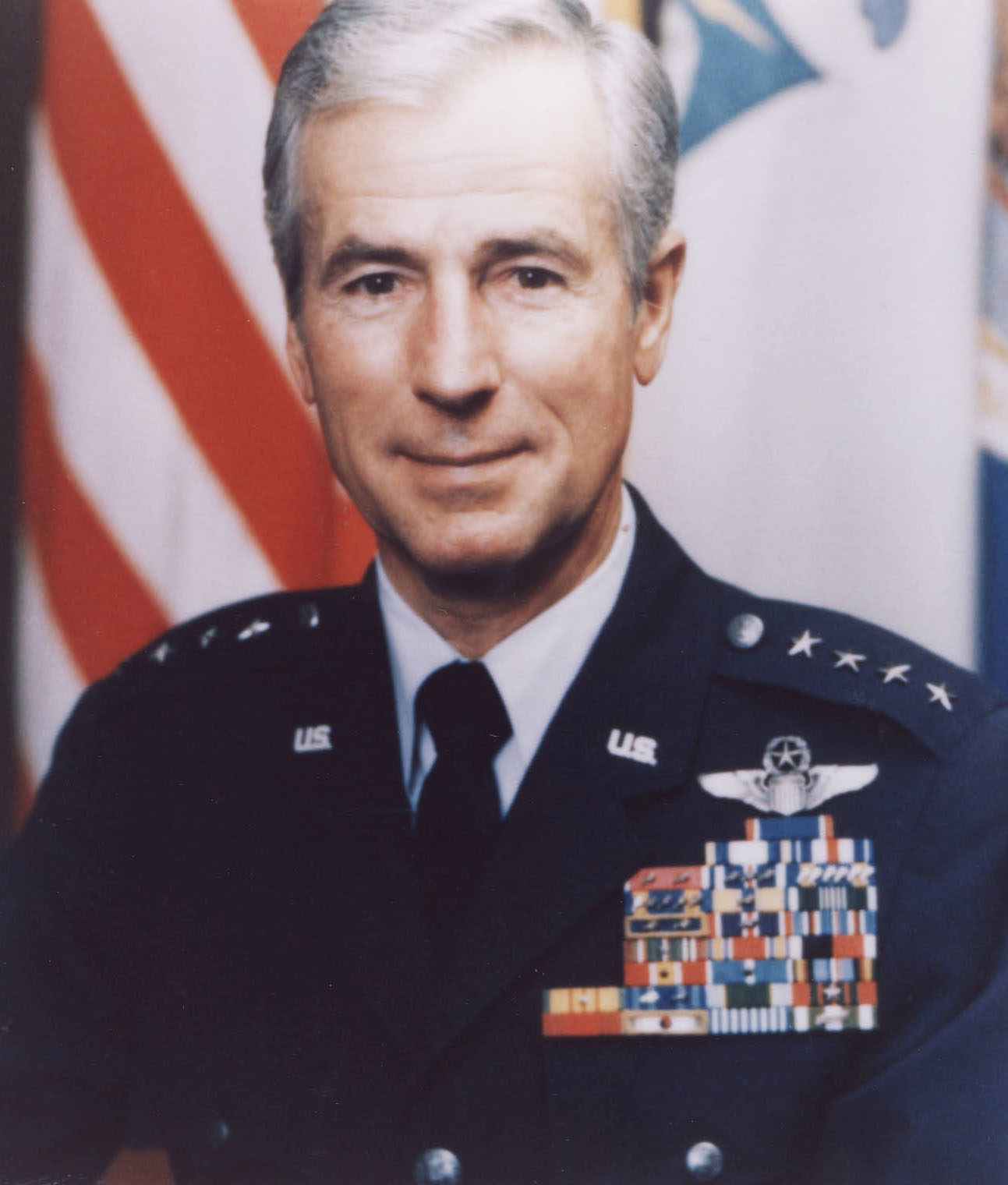
- Born: October 1, 1921; Stillwater, Oklahoma, U.S.
- Died: May 20, 1999 (aged 77); Colorado Springs, Colorado, U.S.
- Burial place: United States Air Force Academy Cemetery
- Military career
- Allegiance: United States of America
- Branch: United States Army; United States Air Force
- Service years: 1942–1947 (Army); 1947–1979 (Air Force)
- Rank: General
- Commands: North American Air Defense Command; Eighth Air Force; Alaskan Command
- Conflicts: World War II; Korean War; Vietnam War
- Awards: Distinguished Service Cross; Defense Distinguished Service Medal; Air Force Distinguished Service Medal (2); Silver Star; Legion of Merit (3); Distinguished Flying Cross (4); Air Medal (41)

General James Erskine Hill (October 1, 1921 – May 20, 1999) was a World War II flying ace, United States Air Force general, and commander in chief of the North American Air Defense Command and the U.S. Air Force Aerospace Defense Command, with consolidated headquarters at Peterson Air Force Base, Colorado Springs, Colorado.

== Early life and education ==
Hill was born in Stillwater, Oklahoma, on October 1, 1921. He graduated from Stillwater High School and then attended Oklahoma State University and the University of Oklahoma. He entered the United States Army Air Corps as an aviation cadet in March 1942 and was commissioned as a second lieutenant upon completing pilot training in February 1943.

== Military career ==
In December 1943, Hill was assigned to the European Theater of Operations as a P-47 Thunderbolt fighter pilot. He became a World War II ace, credited with five enemy aircraft shot down while flying 127 combat missions. He returned to the United States in September 1945 and was released from active duty in December 1945. He then became the commander of a P-51 Mustang squadron in the Oklahoma Air National Guard.

In November 1948, Hill returned to active duty and served as a flight commander with the 3525th Pilot Training Wing, Williams Air Force Base, Arizona. In August 1950, he was transferred to the 8th Fighter-Bomber Wing at Itazuke Air Base, Japan, and began flying combat missions in Korea. He later joined Headquarters Fifth Air Force, Osan Air Base, Korea, where he served as operations officer and chief, Fighter Operations Division, Directorate of Operations. He flew 128 combat missions as an F-80 pilot, downing one enemy aircraft.

Hill returned to the United States in September 1951 and was reassigned to the 3525th Pilot Training Wing as an operations and training staff officer. He transferred to Fort Bragg, North Carolina in January 1952 for duty with the Joint Tactical Air Support Board.

In April 1953, he departed for England to attend the Royal Air Force Flying College at Royal Air Force Station Manby as an exchange officer. Upon graduation, General Hill joined the 20th Fighter-Bomber Wing, Royal Air Force Station Wethersfield, England, and served as an operations staff officer and assistant director of operations for 10 months. In February 1955, he was transferred to the 79th Fighter-Bomber Squadron, Royal Air Force Station Woodbridge, England, where he served as squadron and base commander. In May 1956, he rejoined the 20th Fighter-Bomber Wing and served as director of operations and as deputy commander.

Hill returned to the United States in July 1957 and was assigned as senior Air Force adviser for the 121st Tactical Fighter Wing, Ohio Air National Guard, at Lockbourne Air Force Base, Ohio. From August 1960 to August 1963, he was assigned to Headquarters U.S. Air Force in the Office of the Deputy Chief of Staff, Operations, in the Directorate of Manpower and Organization, as chief of Contract Services Branch, and later served as deputy chief of Organizational Requirements Division.

He attended the Industrial College of the Armed Forces during 1963–64, and was awarded a Bachelor of Science degree in Business Administration from the University of Maryland in 1964. In August 1964, General Hill went to Clark Air Base, Republic of the Philippines, where he was deputy commander for operations of the 405th Fighter Wing; in September 1964, he became commander of the wing; and in January 1966, was reassigned on base to Headquarters Thirteenth Air Force as deputy chief of staff, plans and operations.

Hill returned to the United States in July 1966 and commanded the 3615th Pilot Training Wing, Craig Air Force Base, Alabama. In July 1967, he was assigned as commander of the 40th Air Division at Wurtsmith Air Force Base, Michigan, and in June 1968, he assumed command of the 825th Strategic Aerospace Division at Little Rock Air Force Base, Arkansas. In January 1970, he became commander of the 42d Air Division, Blytheville Air Force Base, Arkansas.

Hill was named deputy assistant to the Secretary of Defense (Atomic Energy) in July 1971. He remained in that post until June 1972 when he was transferred to the United Kingdom as commander of the Third Air Force. In November 1973, he returned to Headquarters U.S. Air Force to be assistant deputy chief of staff for plans and operations.

In September 1974, Hill was assigned as commander in chief, Alaskan Command, with additional duty as commander, Alaskan North American Air Defense Region, with headquarters at Elmendorf Air Force Base, Alaska. He became commander of Alaskan Air Command after dissolution of ALCOM and assimilation of its responsibilities by AAC in July 1975.

Hill was transferred during October 1976 to Barksdale Air Force Base, Louisiana, where, as commander of Eighth Air Force, he was responsible for all Strategic Air Command operations and bases in the eastern half of the United States. General Hill was vice commander in chief, SAC Headquarters at Offutt Air Force Base, Nebraska from July 1 to December 6, 1977, when he assumed command of North American Air Defense Command (NORAD), and was promoted to the rank of general on December 21, 1977.

== Later life ==
Hill retired on December 31, 1979, and in retirement was President of the Colorado Springs Chamber of Commerce. Hill died of cancer on May 20, 1999, aged 77, and was buried at the United States Air Force Academy Cemetery four days later.

== Awards and decorations ==
U.S. Air Force Command Pilot Badge

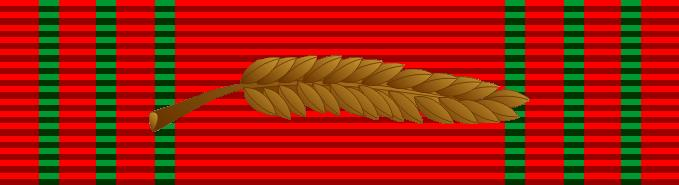
Army Distinguished Service Cross
Defense Distinguished Service Medal
Air Force Distinguished Service Medal with bronze oak leaf cluster
Silver Star
Legion of Merit with two bronze oak leaf clusters
Distinguished Flying Cross with three bronze oak leaf clusters
Air Medal with four silver oak leaf clusters
Air Medal with three silver and one bronze oak leaf clusters
Air Medal with two bronze oak leaf clusters
Air Force Commendation Medal with bronze oak leaf cluster
Army Commendation Medal
Air Force Presidential Unit Citation with two bronze oak leaf clusters
Air Force Outstanding Unit Award with bronze oak leaf cluster
American Campaign Medal
European-African-Middle Eastern Campaign Medal with silver campaign star
World War II Victory Medal
Army of Occupation Medal
National Defense Service Medal with one bronze service star
Korean Service Medal with one bronze campaign star
Armed Forces Expeditionary Medal
Vietnam Service Medal with one silver campaign star
Air Force Longevity Service Award with silver and three bronze oak leaf clusters
Small Arms Expert Marksmanship Ribbon
Croix de Guerre with silver star (France)
Croix de Guerre with Palm (Belgium)
Republic of Korea Presidential Unit Citation
United Nations Korea Medal
Vietnam Campaign Medal
Korean War Service Medal

=== Distinguished Service Cross citation ===

Hill, James Erskine
Major (Air Corps), U.S Army Air Forces
388th Fighter Squadron, 365th Fighter Group, 9th Air Force
Date of Action: April 18, 1945
Headquarters, U.S. Army Air Forces in Europe, General Orders No. 134 (October 14, 1945)

Citation:

The President of the United States of America, authorized by Act of Congress July 9, 1918, takes pleasure in presenting the Distinguished Service Cross to Major (Air Corps) James Erskine Hill, United States Army Air Forces, for extraordinary heroism in connection with military operations against an armed enemy while serving as Pilot of a P-47 Thunderbolt of the 388th Fighter Squadron, 365th Fighter Group, NINTH Air Force, in action while leading a squadron of eleven P-47's on 18 April 1945. On this date, Major Hill encountered and aggressively attacked a numerically superior force of ME-109's. Demonstrating cool judgment and daring courage, he personally destroyed three enemy aircraft and expertly led and directed his squadron mates in the destruction of seven more in the air, two on the ground, and one damaged on the ground, thus accounting for all the enemy aircraft encountered without loss of a single P-47 or pilot. Major Hill's heroism, skill, and complete disregard for his personal safety reflect highest credit upon himself and the Armed Forces of the United States.

== Legacy ==
The General James E. Hill Lifetime Space Achievement Award is presented annually by the Space Foundation to an outstanding individual who has distinguished himself/herself through lifetime contributions to the welfare or betterment of humankind through the exploration, development and use of space, or the use of space technology, information, themes or resources in academic, cultural, industrial or other pursuits of broad benefit to humanity. Gen. Hill was the chairman of the Space Foundation from 1986 to 1999. Recipients include:

- 2002 Norman R. Augustine
- 2003 CAPT James A. Lovell Jr., USN (Ret.)
- 2004 The late Gen. Bernard A. Schriever, USAF (Ret.)
- 2005 The Honorable Edward C. Aldridge, Jr.
- 2006 Buzz Aldrin, Sc.D.
- 2007 Simon Ramo, Ph.D.
- 2008 Hans Mark, Ph.D.
- 2009 The Honorable Peter B. Teets
- 2010 CAPT John Young (astronaut), USN, (Ret.)
- 2011 Dr. Charles Elachi, Ph.D.
- 2012 Gen. Thomas S. Moorman, Jr., USAF, (Ret.)
- 2013 Neil Armstrong and Sally Ride, Ph.D.
- 2014 A. Thomas Young
- 2015 Jean-Jacques Dordain, Director General of the European Space Agency (ESA)
- 2016 VADM Richard H. Truly, USN, (Ret.)
- 2017 Piers Sellers, Ph.D.
- 2018 Christopher Columbus "Chris" Kraft Jr.
