= James W. Plummer =

American aerospace engineer (1920–2013)

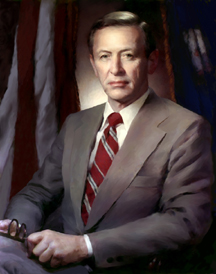

5th Director of the National Reconnaissance Office
- In office December 21, 1973 – June 28, 1976
- President: Richard M. Nixon; Gerald R. Ford
- Preceded by: John L. McLucas
- Succeeded by: Thomas C. Reed

Personal details
- Born: January 29, 1920 Idaho Springs, Colorado, United States
- Died: January 16, 2013 (aged 92) Medford, Oregon, United States
- Education: University of California, Berkeley; University of Maryland
- Profession: Engineering
- Awards: Charles Stark Draper Prize

James W. Plummer (January 29, 1920 – January 16, 2013) was an engineer and explorer who served as the fifth Director of the National Reconnaissance Office (NRO). He previously served as the Lockheed Corporation program manager and overall systems engineer for the CORONA and LANYARD imaging systems, focusing on development of the second generation of U.S. satellites.

At the beginning of the top-secret CORONA program, Plummer was directed to establish and oversee an off-site facility to build and launch, within a period of nine months, a satellite borne camera and physical recovery system. The successful project created the field of satellite surveillance, providing vital photographic information that permitted the United States to gauge the nuclear threat posed by the Soviet Union during the Cold War and pursue more effective foreign policies. His team accomplished the first successful recovery of a man-made object from earth orbit.

Plummer's work on the military applications of near-earth satellites and his role as a consultant to the Secretary of Defense in 1972 and 1973 led to his appointment by President Richard M. Nixon to serve as the Under Secretary of the Air Force. He served in this capacity from December 1973 to mid-1976. For a brief period, from 23 November 1975 to 2 January 1976, he was the Acting Secretary of the Air Force. Following his tour as Under Secretary of the Air Force, he returned to Lockheed Missile & Space Company as its Executive Vice President and General Manager, and at the same time served as a Vice President of its parent company, Lockheed Corporation.

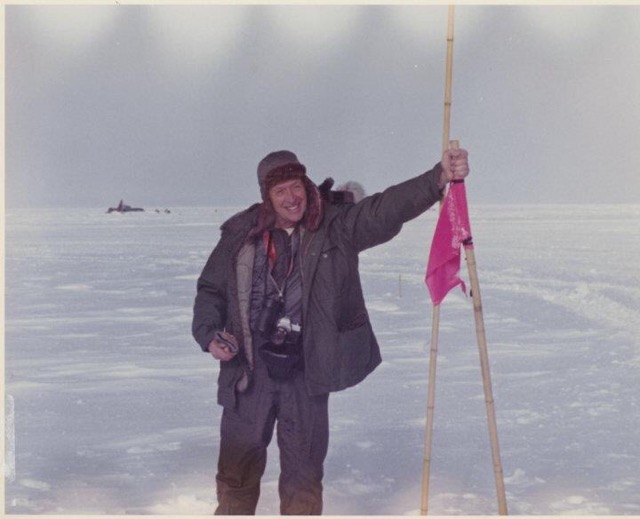
James Plummer at the south pole with the National Science Foundation in 1975 as part of operation DEEP FREEZE.

Plummer was an avid skier and explorer. He participated in numerous scientific and military expeditions, including time in the Far and Middle East, Antarctica, and Greenland. He resided in various Oregon towns until his death in Medford in 2013 at age 92.

== Education and Military Service ==
James W. Plummer received his Bachelor of Science in electrical engineering from the University of California, Berkeley, in 1942, taking as many courses as he could in electronic communications. After graduation from the University of California in 1942, he entered the U.S. Navy as an ensign. He received radar training at Harvard; M.I.T.; and the Navy bases at Corpus Christi, Texas and Ford Island, Oahu, Hawaii. He then reported to Torpedo Squadron 10, Puunene Air Base, Maui, in the Hawaiian Islands.

Plummer served aboard the USS Enterprise (CV-6)—the most decorated ship of World War II—from December 1943 to May 1945. He served as a radar specialist for Torpedo Squadron 10 and subsequently Night Torpedo Squadron 90 (VT(N)-90). His tasks included training crews in the use of radar, establishing and supervising a maintenance shop, and flying with the squadron as a Technical Observer. Subsequently, he served as the ship's maintenance officer aboard the Enterprise and flew low-level observation of Japanese targets on islands in the Pacific.

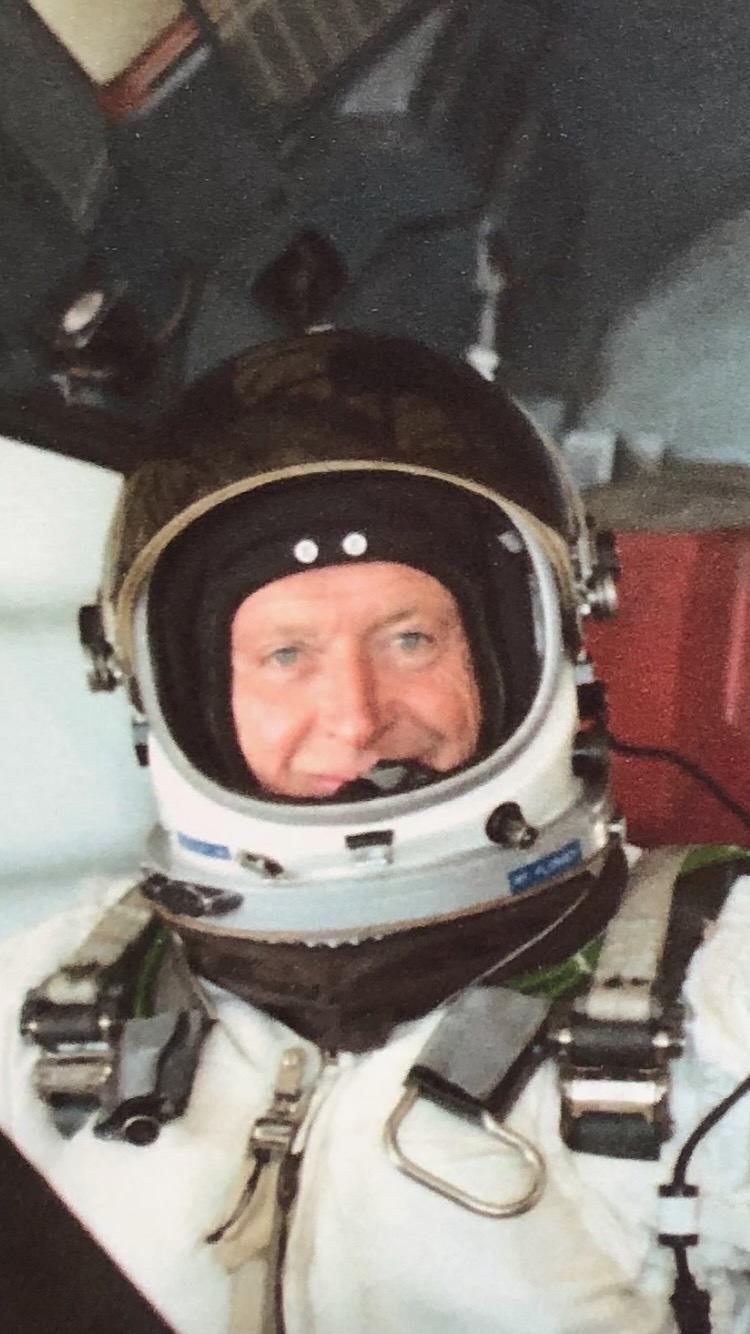
Plummer in the second cockpit of the SR71.

Following the war, Plummer earned his Master of Science, also in electrical engineering, from the University of Maryland in 1953.

== Geopolitics ==
During his appointment as Under Secretary of the Air Force, Plummer traveled to Iran to meet Hassan Toufanian, the military procurement general under the Shah of Iran. Discussions focused mainly on Toufanian's opinion that US contractors were not performing on US-Iranian contracts, for which he blamed the US Air Force.

== Awards and accolades ==
Plummer was elected to the National Academy of Engineering in 1978 and was designated as a Space and Missile Pioneer by the U.S. Air Force in 1989. He was honored by the Director of Central Intelligence as a Corona Pioneer in 1995. Elected Honorary Fellow of the American Institute of Aeronautics and a Fellow of the Astronautics American Astronautical Society. Plummer was awarded the US Air Force Meritorious Achievement Award for his contributions to the Discoverer Space Program; the Doolittle Award from Aerospace Corporation; and the Goddard Astronautics Award, AIAA. In 2005 he received the Charles Stark Draper Prize—one of the world's preeminent awards in engineering—for his contributions to the CORONA project.

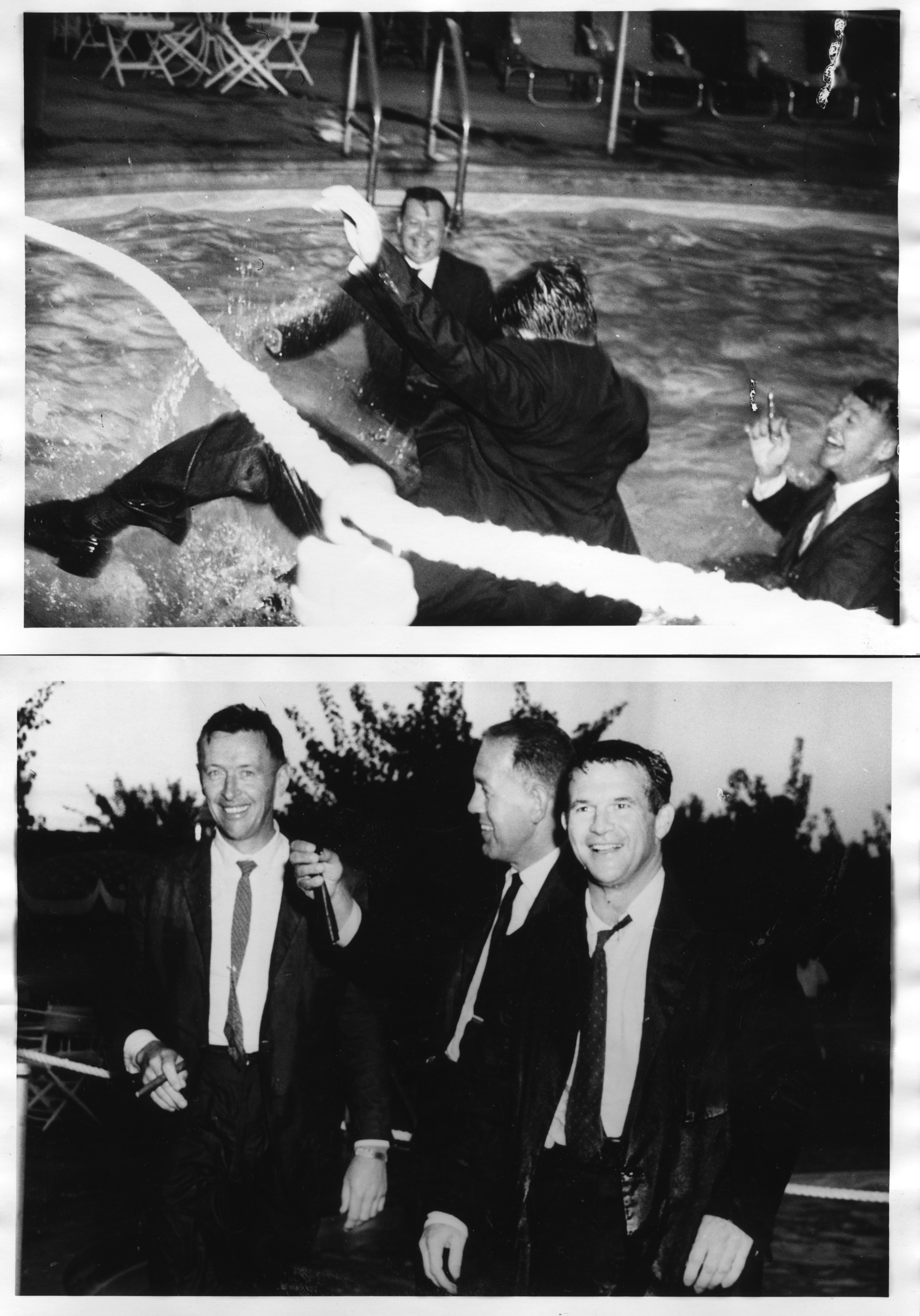
Mr. James W. Plummer (far right and far left, respectively) and colleagues celebrating the first successful recovery of the CORONA system.

Since its declassification in 1995, the CORONA project has been praised as a milestone in US history:

Developers of this nation’s first film-return photoreconnaissance satellite explored and conquered many technological unknowns of space, lifted the curtain of secrecy that screened military developments within the Soviet Union and Communist China, and opened the way for the more sophisticated follow-on imaging satellite systems....Over its lifetime, CORONA provided photographic coverage totaling approximately 750,000,000 square miles of the earth’s surface. This impressive capability was surpassed only by the quantity and quality of intelligence that it yielded. Without CORONA, the US may well have been misguidedly pressured into a World War III.

Government offices
Preceded by John L. McLucas	United States Under Secretary of the Air Force; December 21, 1973 – June 28, 1976	Succeeded by Hans Mark
