= Russell A. Rourke =

American lawyer

Russell Rourke
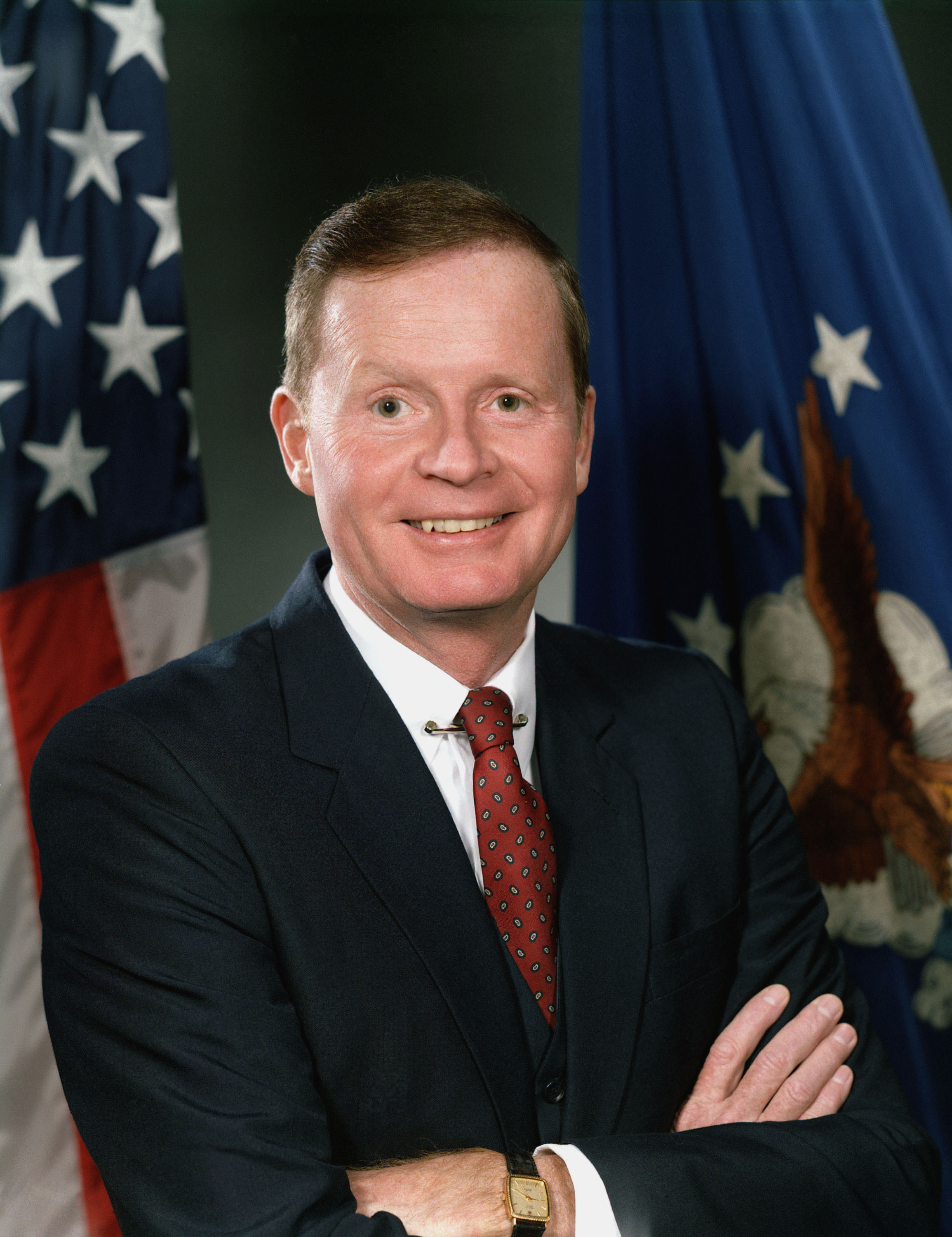

15th United States Secretary of the Air Force
- In office December 1, 1985 – April 7, 1986
- President: Ronald Reagan
- Preceded by: Verne Orr
- Succeeded by: Edward C. Aldridge Jr.

Personal details
- Born: December 30, 1931 New York City, New York, U.S.
- Died: January 19, 2003 (aged 71) Annapolis, Maryland, U.S.
- Party: Republican
- Education: University of Maryland, College Park (BA); Georgetown University (LLB)

Military service
- Allegiance: United States
- Branch/service: United States Marine Corps
- Years of service: 1953–1985
- Unit: United States Marine Corps Reserve

Russell A. Rourke (December 30, 1931 – January 19, 2003) was an American lawyer and public official. He served in key staff positions on Capital Hill and in senior executive positions within the Federal Government. President Ronald Reagan appointed him to serve as the fifteenth Secretary of the Air Force.

== Early life and education ==
Born in New York City, Rourke completed his graduation in political science at the University of Maryland in 1953 and also went to Georgetown University's law school in 1959.

== Career ==
=== Military ===
After graduation, he enlisted in the United States Marine Corps. He served in the Korean War, completing his active duty service as a first lieutenant. However, Rourke remained in the Marine Corps Reserve, eventually commanding the Marine Air Control Squadron 24 at Quantico, Virginia. He retired in 1985 as a colonel after 32 years of service. His Marine decorations include the Legion of Merit.

After being released from active duty in the Marine Corps, Rourke attended law school at Georgetown University Law Center earning a bachelor of laws degree in 1959. He then worked briefly in the Washington, D.C. law firm of Keogh, Carey, and Costello as an associate attorney before beginning his public service career in 1960.

=== Public service ===
Rourke began his civilian government service as administrative assistant to Republican Congressman John R. Pillion of New York. In 1965, he became administrative assistant to Congressman Henry P. Smith III another New York Republican. When Congressman Smith retired in 1974, Rourke ran as a Republican-Conservative candidate for Congress in the 36th district of New York. Although the district had been held by Republicans for the previous 62 years, Rourke had not lived in the district for many years and the Watergate scandal was an issue that worked against Republican candidates in the election. As a result, he was defeated by a three-to-two margin to Democrat John LaFalce.

Following his unsuccessful run for Congress, Rourke became deputy to presidential counselor John O. Marsh. In 1976, he became a special assistant to President Gerald R. Ford. His responsibilities included legislative liaison between the White House and Congress. After President Ford lost his bid for re-election in 1977, Rourke served on the White House Transition Team. At the close of the Ford Administration, Rourke accepted a position as administrative assistant to Republican Congressman Harold S. Sawyer of Michigan.

In May 1981, President Reagan nominated Rourke as assistant secretary for legislative affairs in the Department of Defense. In that capacity, Rourke was the principal adviser to Secretary of Defense Caspar W. Weinberger on congressional matters and was responsible for overseeing congressional liaison activities in the Department and military Services. Upon his departure in 1985, he was awarded the Department of Defense Distinguished Civilian Service Medal by Secretary Weinberger.

On September 27, 1985, President Reagan nominated Rourke to replace Verne Orr who was retiring after five years as Secretary of the Air Force. After confirmation by the United States Senate, he was sworn in as the fifteenth Secretary of the Air Force on December 1, 1985. He served only four months in that position before resigning on April 7, 1986, for personal reasons.

After leaving the Air Force, Rourke and his family operated a real estate business in Annapolis, Maryland. He died in Annapolis, Maryland, on January 19, 2003, at the age 71.
