= Robert J. Hermann =

American American public servant (1933–2023)

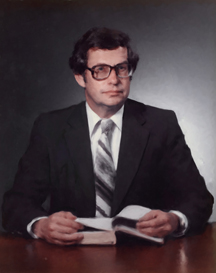

8th Director of the National Reconnaissance Office
- In office October 8, 1979 – August 2, 1981
- President: Jimmy Carter; Ronald Reagan
- Preceded by: Hans Mark
- Succeeded by: Edward Aldridge Jr.

Personal details
- Born: April 6, 1933 Sheldahl, Iowa, U.S.
- Died: October 5, 2023 (aged 90) Darien, Connecticut, U.S.
- Education: Iowa State University (B.Sc., M.Sc., D.Sc.)

Robert Jay Hermann (April 6, 1933 – October 5, 2023) was an American public servant who was the eighth Director of the National Reconnaissance Office.

== Life and career ==
Hermann was born on April 6, 1933. He was the major architect of the National Security Agency's expanded role in space reconnaissance. In addition, he advocated broadening the NRO's support to tactical military customers. Hermann was also responsible for establishing the Defense Reconnaissance Support Program.

In 1989, Hermann was elected a member of the National Academy of Engineering for conceiving and guiding applications of space technologies to national security.

Hermann died in Darien, Connecticut on October 5, 2023, at the age of 90.
