= Thomas C. Reed =

American politician (1934–2024)

Thomas Reed
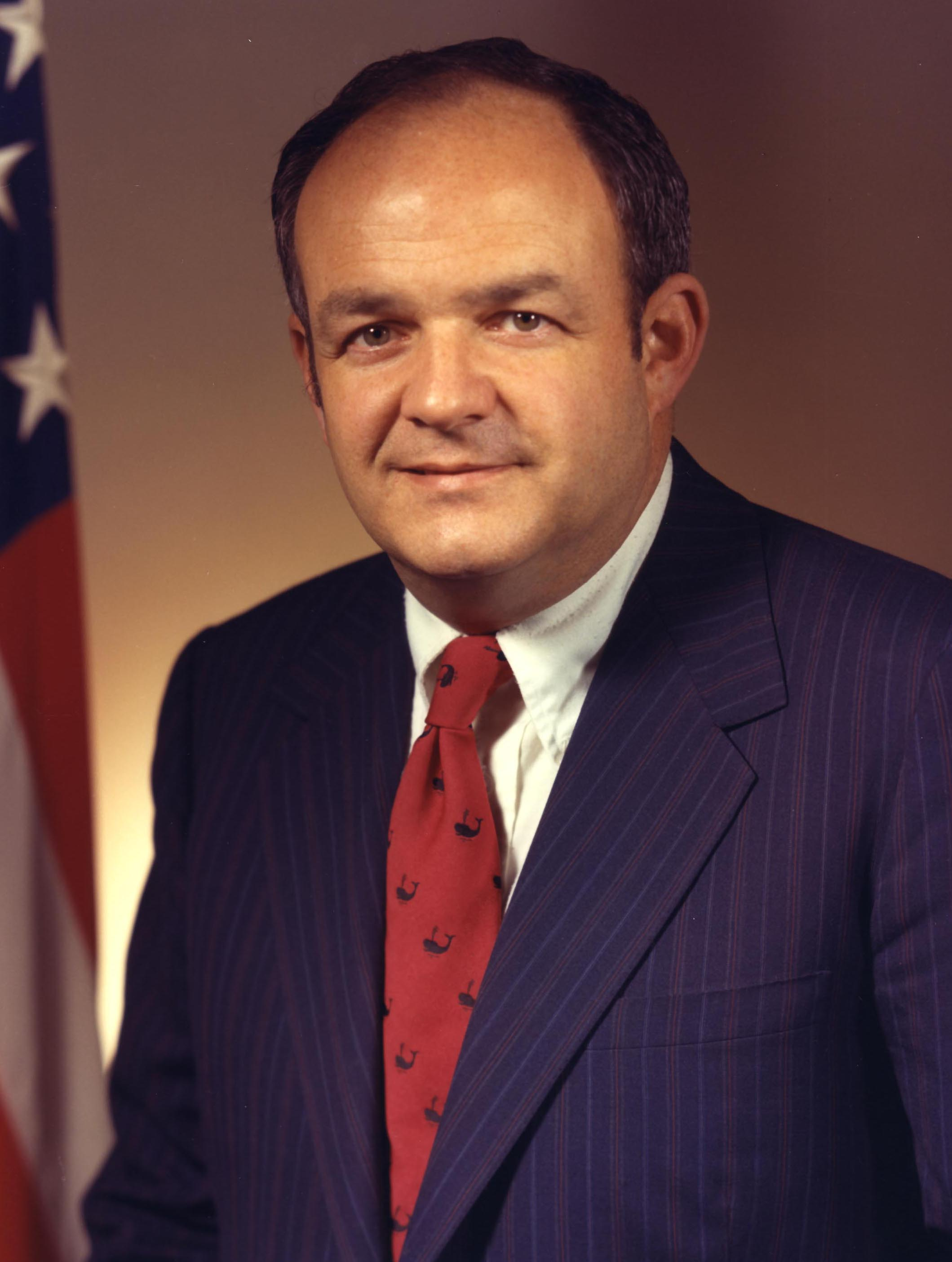

6th Director of the National Reconnaissance Office
- In office August 9, 1976 – April 7, 1977
- President: Gerald Ford; Jimmy Carter
- Preceded by: James W. Plummer
- Succeeded by: Hans Mark

11th United States Secretary of the Air Force
- In office January 2, 1976 – April 6, 1977
- President: Gerald Ford; Jimmy Carter
- Preceded by: John L. McLucas
- Succeeded by: John C. Stetson

Personal details
- Born: March 1, 1934 New York City, U.S.
- Died: February 11, 2024 (aged 89) Santa Rosa, California, U.S.
- Party: Republican
- Education: Cornell University (BS); University of Southern California (MS)

Thomas Care Reed (March 1, 1934 – February 11, 2024) was an American politician who served as the 11th Secretary of the Air Force from January 2, 1976 to April 6, 1977 under Gerald Ford and Jimmy Carter. Previously he was a senior aide to California Governor Ronald Reagan.

== Early life ==
Reed was born in New York City, N.Y., on March 1, 1934. He attended Deerfield Academy, and then received a bachelor of science degree in mechanical engineering from Cornell University, graduating first in his class in 1956. Reed was elected into the Sphinx Head Society during his senior year.

As an undergraduate, he was enrolled in Cornell's Air Force Reserve Officer Training Corps program and was the highest-ranking officer, cadet colonel, during his senior year. He was designated a distinguished military graduate and was commissioned as a second lieutenant in the Air Force upon graduation.

== Military career ==
Reed began active duty with the Air Force in November 1956, and served until 1959 as technical project officer for the Minuteman Re-Entry Vehicle System with the Air Force's Ballistic Missile Division. While on this assignment, he attended the University of Southern California during off-duty hours and earned a master of science degree in electrical engineering.

In 1959, he was assigned to the Lawrence Radiation Laboratory of the University of California, engaged in thermonuclear weapons physics. He was released from active duty with the Air Force in May 1961, but he rejoined the Lawrence Radiation Laboratory as a civilian for the 1962 test series, continuing there as a consultant until 1967.

== Business career ==
In 1962, Reed organized Supercon Ltd. of Houston, Texas, as its managing partner. Supercon developed and produced alloys which were superconducting at cryogenic temperatures.

While maintaining an interest in Supercon Ltd., Reed organized the Quaker Hill Development Corporation at San Rafael, California, in 1965, and served as its treasurer, president and chairman. Quaker Hill has agricultural, recreational and construction projects in California and Colorado.

In the early 1970s, he and another Cornell University alumni, Frank Woods, partnered in the development of a ski resort in Breckenridge, Colorado.

In the mid-1970s, Reed and Woods began growing wine grapes in Sonoma County, and opened the Clos du Bois winery. By the late 1980s it was selling more than 200,000 cases a year. In 1988, Reed and Woods sold the winery to the Hiram Walker liquor company, for about $40 million.

== Political career ==
Reed was also active in the political world. He was an organizer for Ronald Reagan's first campaign for governor of California in 1966. He helped finance Governor Reagan's first unsuccessful run for the presidency in 1968, when Reagan competed with Richard Nixon for the Republican nomination. Reed established a national network of political operatives and hired F. Clifton White, the noted political strategist, to guide the effort. Reed managed Reagan's successful gubernatorial re-election campaign in 1970. In 1972, Reed performed as a national operative for the Nixon presidential re-election drive.

During Gerald Ford's presidency, Reed was appointed an assistant to the secretary and deputy secretary of defense in 1973, and was appointed director of Telecommunications and Command and Control Systems in February 1974. Reed served as the 11th Secretary of the Air Force from January 2, 1976 to April 6, 1977, leaving at the beginning of Jimmy Carter's presidency.

After Reagan began President in 1980, Reed served as a vice chairman of the newly created National Commission on Strategic Forces. Reed's financial dealings in 1981 as a private businessman were investigated for insider trading by a federal prosecutor in New York City, and he resigned as President Reagan's Special Assistant for National Security Affairs in March 1983. After a jury trial in 1985, Reed was not found guilty.

== Writing career ==
"the most monumental non-nuclear explosion and fire ever seen from space"

On March 9, 2004, At the Abyss: An Insider's History of the Cold War, an autobiographical book about his experience at Lawrence Livermore National Laboratory through his time as an advisor to President Ronald Reagan. It reveals new details about the 1962 Cuban Missile Crisis, the Central Intelligence Agency, the Farewell Dossier, and other facets of the Cold War. It also describes a CIA plan approved by Reagan to undermine the Soviet Union's ability to sell natural gas to Western Europe by secretly installing malware in the technology used to operate pipelines. The effort resulted in a huge pipeline explosion in Siberia in the summer of 1982, he wrote.

Reed's second book, co-authored with Danny B. Stillman, was titled The Nuclear Express: A Political History of the Bomb and Its Proliferation and was published in January 2009. One of the authors' most notable contentions is that in 1982 China made a policy decision to flood the developing world with atomic know-how. In February 2012, Reed published a spy novel titled The Tehran Triangle (Black Garnet Press 2012). The book is about Iran's attempt to build and detonate an atomic bomb in the United States.

== Death ==
Reed died in Santa Rosa, California on February 11, 2024, at the age of 89.

Military offices
Preceded by James W. Plummer (acting)	United States Secretary of the Air Force; 1976–1977	Succeeded by John Charles Stetson
