= Hans Mark =

American government official (1929–2021)

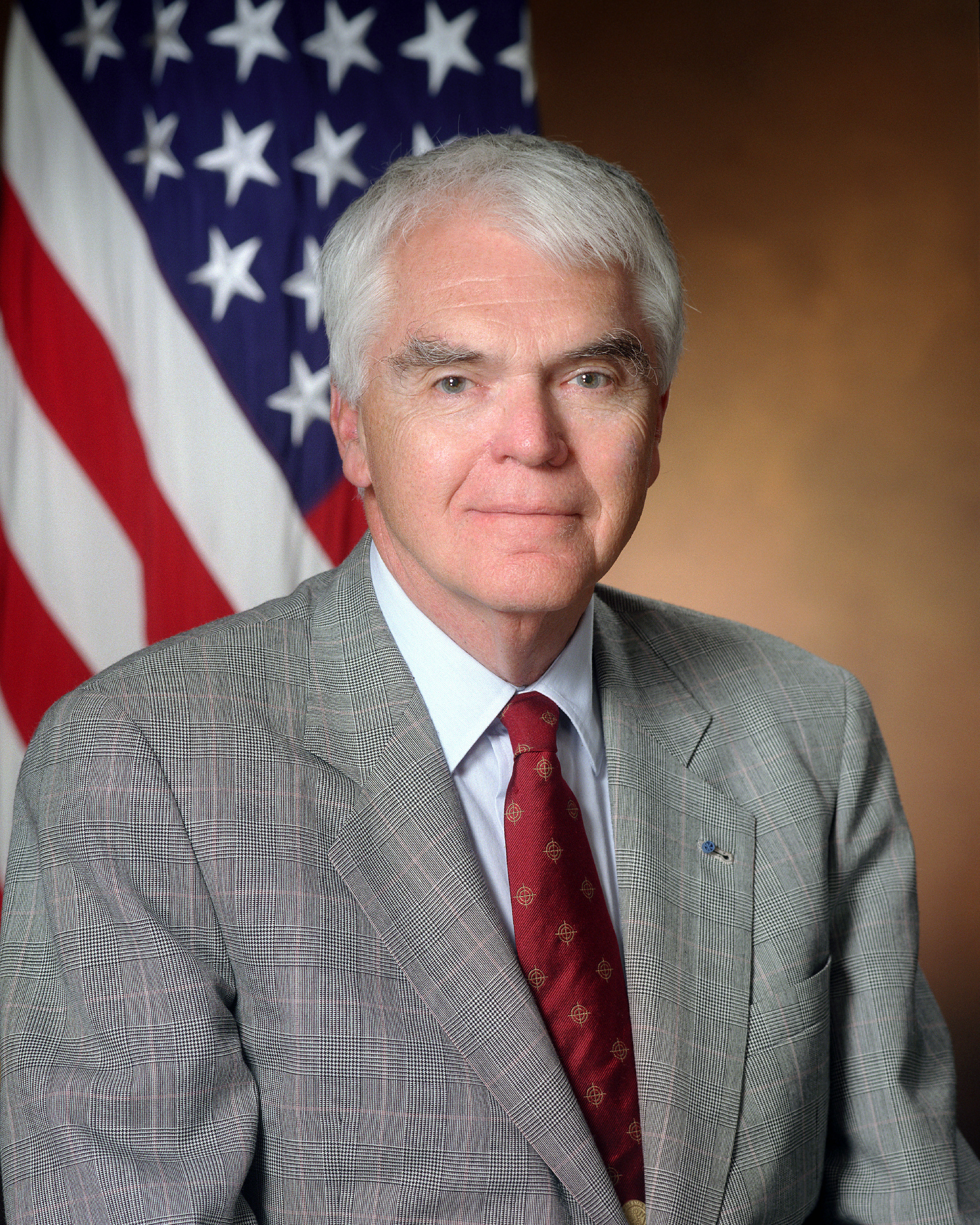
- Mark in 1998

13th United States Secretary of the Air Force
- In office May 18, 1979 – February 9, 1981; Acting: May 18, 1979 – July 26, 1979
- President: Jimmy Carter; Ronald Reagan
- Preceded by: John C. Stetson
- Succeeded by: Verne Orr

7th Director of the National Reconnaissance Office
- In office August 3, 1977 – October 8, 1979
- President: Jimmy Carter
- Preceded by: Thomas C. Reed
- Succeeded by: Robert J. Hermann

Personal details
- Born: Hans Michael Mark; June 17, 1929 Mannheim, Baden, Germany
- Died: December 18, 2021 (aged 92) Austin, Texas, U.S.
- Education: University of California, Berkeley (BS); Massachusetts Institute of Technology (MS, PhD)

Hans Michael Mark (June 17, 1929 – December 18, 2021) was a German-born American government official who served as Secretary of the Air Force and as a Deputy Administrator of NASA. He was an expert and consultant in aerospace design and national defense policy.

Mark retired from the Department of Aerospace Engineering and Engineering Mechanics at the University of Texas at Austin's Cockrell School of Engineering in July 2014.

== Early life and career ==
Mark was born in the city of Mannheim, Baden, Germany. He lived in Vienna for a time before escaping the Nazi Anschluss via Switzerland. Before the collapse of France the Mark family moved to London. Mark's father, Herman Francis Mark, a prominent polymer chemist, secured a position with a Canadian paper company and left before the family could accompany him. Finally, in late 1939, his family joined him in Hawkesbury, Ontario. About a year later the family moved to the United States, settling in the Flatbush section of Brooklyn, New York after the elder Mark accepted a professorship at the Polytechnic Institute of Brooklyn. After becoming an American citizen in 1945, he graduated from New York's selective Stuyvesant High School in 1947. He went on to receive a bachelor's degree in physics from the University of California, Berkeley (where he was a member of Sigma Pi fraternity) in 1951. He then earned a Ph.D. in physics from the Massachusetts Institute of Technology in 1954.

After receiving his doctorate, Mark stayed on at MIT as a research associate and acting head of the Neutron Physics Group Laboratory for Nuclear Science. He returned to UC Berkeley in 1955 and remained there until 1958 as a research physicist at the university's Lawrence Radiation Laboratory in Livermore, California. Mark then returned to MIT as an assistant professor of physics. In 1960, he again returned to the University of California's Livermore Radiation Laboratory's Experimental Physics Division. He remained there until 1964, when he became chairman of the university's Department of Nuclear Engineering and administrator of the Berkeley Research Reactor.

Mark also taught undergraduate and graduate courses in physics, engineering and management at Boston University, the University of California, Davis and Stanford University.

== U.S. government ==
In February 1969, he became director of NASA's Ames Research Center, located in Mountain View, California. In this role, he managed the center's research and applications efforts in aeronautics, space science, life science, and space technology.

He subsequently served as Under Secretary of the Air Force from 1977 until July 1979, when he was promoted to Secretary of the Air Force. Concurrently, he served as Director of the then-classified National Reconnaissance Office from August 1977 to October 1979. He remained at this position until 1981, when he was appointed Deputy Administrator of NASA by President Reagan, a position he served in from July 10, 1981, to September 1, 1984. He later returned to the Pentagon in 1999–2000 to serve as Director of Defense Research and Engineering (DDR&E).

== University of Texas ==
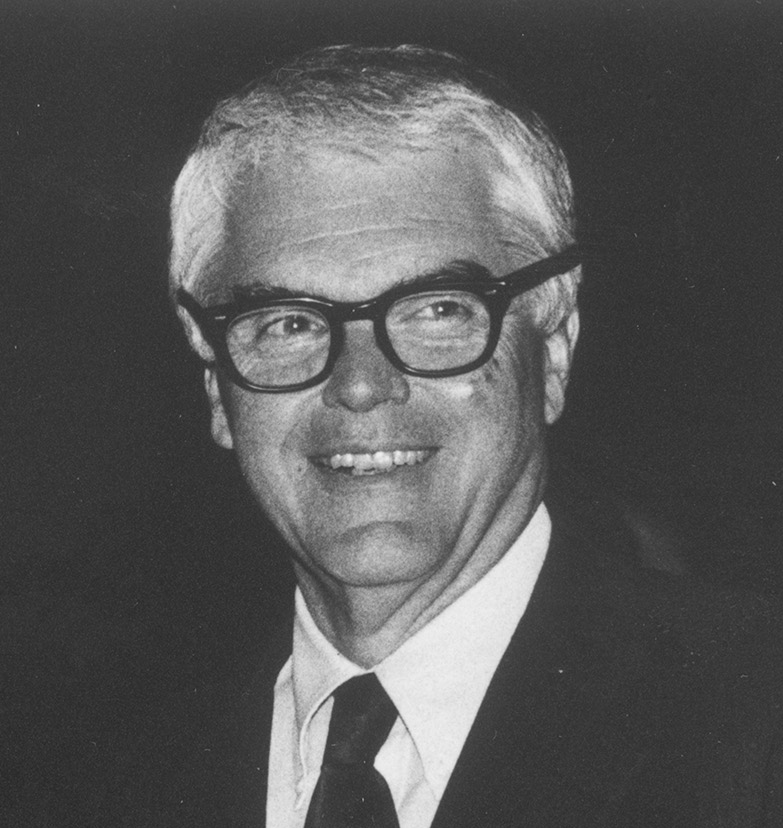
Mark as the University of Texas System chancellor in 1986

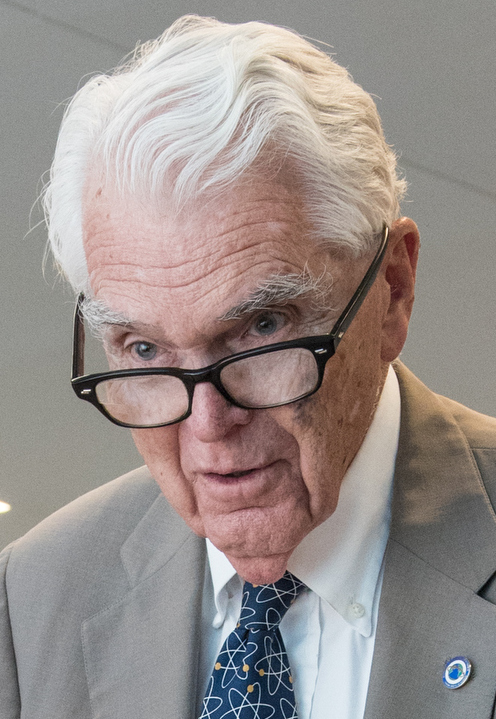
Mark in 2015

Upon leaving NASA in 1984, Mark served as Chancellor of the University of Texas System until 1992. He moved on to become a senior professor of aerospace engineering at the University of Texas at Austin. In July 1998, he began work at The Pentagon upon President Clinton's nomination of him as Director of Defense Research and Engineering. In 2001, he returned to the University of Texas at Austin, where he held the John J. McKetta Centennial Energy Chair in Engineering as a professor in the Department of Aerospace Engineering and Engineering Mechanics and held a research position at the University of Texas' Applied Research Laboratories. Mark retired from the faculty of the University of Texas at Austin on July 1, 2014. He was voted by the Regents of the university as a Professor Emeritus of Aerospace Engineering and Engineering Mechanics.

== Honors ==
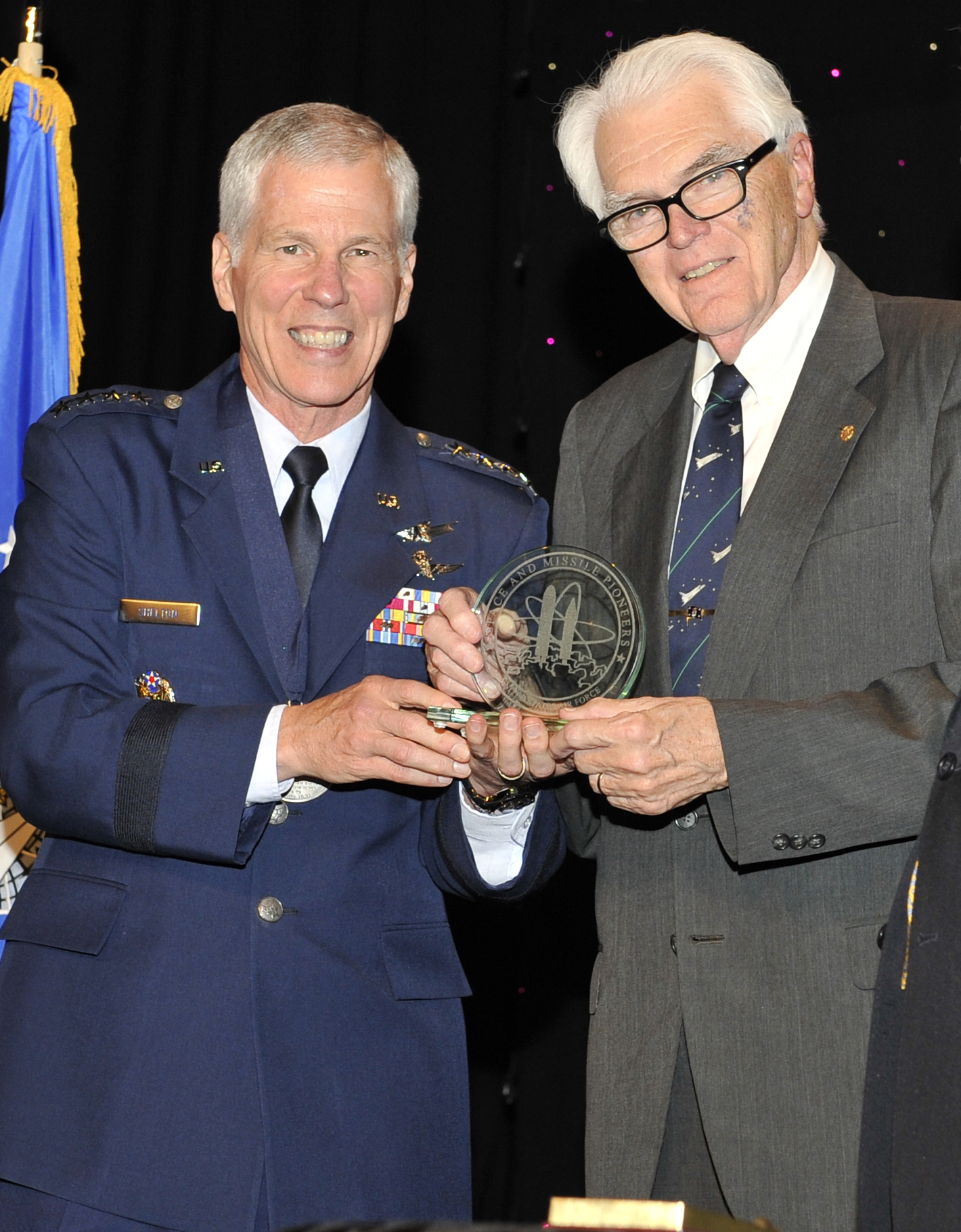
Mark receiving the Air Force Space and Missile Pioneers Award in 2012

Mark was a member of the National Academy of Engineering, the nation's highest honor for engineering professionals. He was awarded the Robert Henry Thurston Lecture Award from the American Society of Mechanical Engineers in 1982. He was also an Honorary Fellow of the American Institute of Aeronautics and Astronautics. He received the 1999 Joe J. King Engineering Achievement Award and the 1999 George E. Haddaway Medal for Achievement in Aviation. Dr. Mark was honored for his contributions to the U.S. military space program at the 2006 annual meeting of the American Astronautical Society. He received the 2006 Military Astronautics Award on November 14, 2006, at the society's annual meeting in Pasadena, California.

In 2008, the Space Foundation awarded Mark its highest honor, the General James E. Hill Lifetime Space Achievement Award. It is presented annually to recognize outstanding individuals who have distinguished themselves through lifetime contributions to the welfare or betterment of humankind through the exploration, development and use of space, or the use of space technology, information, themes or resources in academic, cultural, industrial or other pursuits of broad benefit to humanity.

In 2012, the Air Force Space Command awarded him the Air Force Space and Missile Pioneers Award. The award recognizes individuals for their significant role in the history of Air Force space and missile programs.

== Later life and death ==
Mark died from progressive dementia in Austin, Texas, on December 18, 2021, at the age of 92. He is survived by his daughter, Jane Mark, his son Rufus Mark, his grandchildren, Rob and Rixana Jopson, and Phillip, Nick, and Juliette Mark, and his great-granddaughter Julianna Mark.

== Publications ==
Dr. Mark authored or edited eight books and published more than 180 technical reports. His works include:

- (co-authored) Adventures in Celestial Mechanics
- (co-authored) Encyclopedia of Space and Technology
- The Space Station: A Personal Journey (Duke University Press, 1987)
- The Management of Research Institutions (NASA SP-481, 1984)
- (co-authored) Experiments in Modern Physics and Power and Security
- (co-authored) The Properties of Matter Under Unusual Conditions
- An Anxious Peace: A Cold War Memoir (Texas A&M University Press, 2019)

Government offices
Preceded by James W. Plummer	United States Under Secretary of the Air Force; 1977—1979	Succeeded by Antonia Handler Chayes
Preceded by John C. Stetson	United States Secretary of the Air Force; 1979—1981	Succeeded by Verne Orr
Preceded by Alan M. Lovelace	Deputy Administrator of NASA; 1981–1984	Succeeded by William Robert Graham
Preceded by Anita K. Jones	Director of Defense Research and Engineering; 1998–2001	Succeeded by Ronald M. Sega
