= John L. McLucas =

US Secretary of the Air Force (1920–2002)

John McLucas
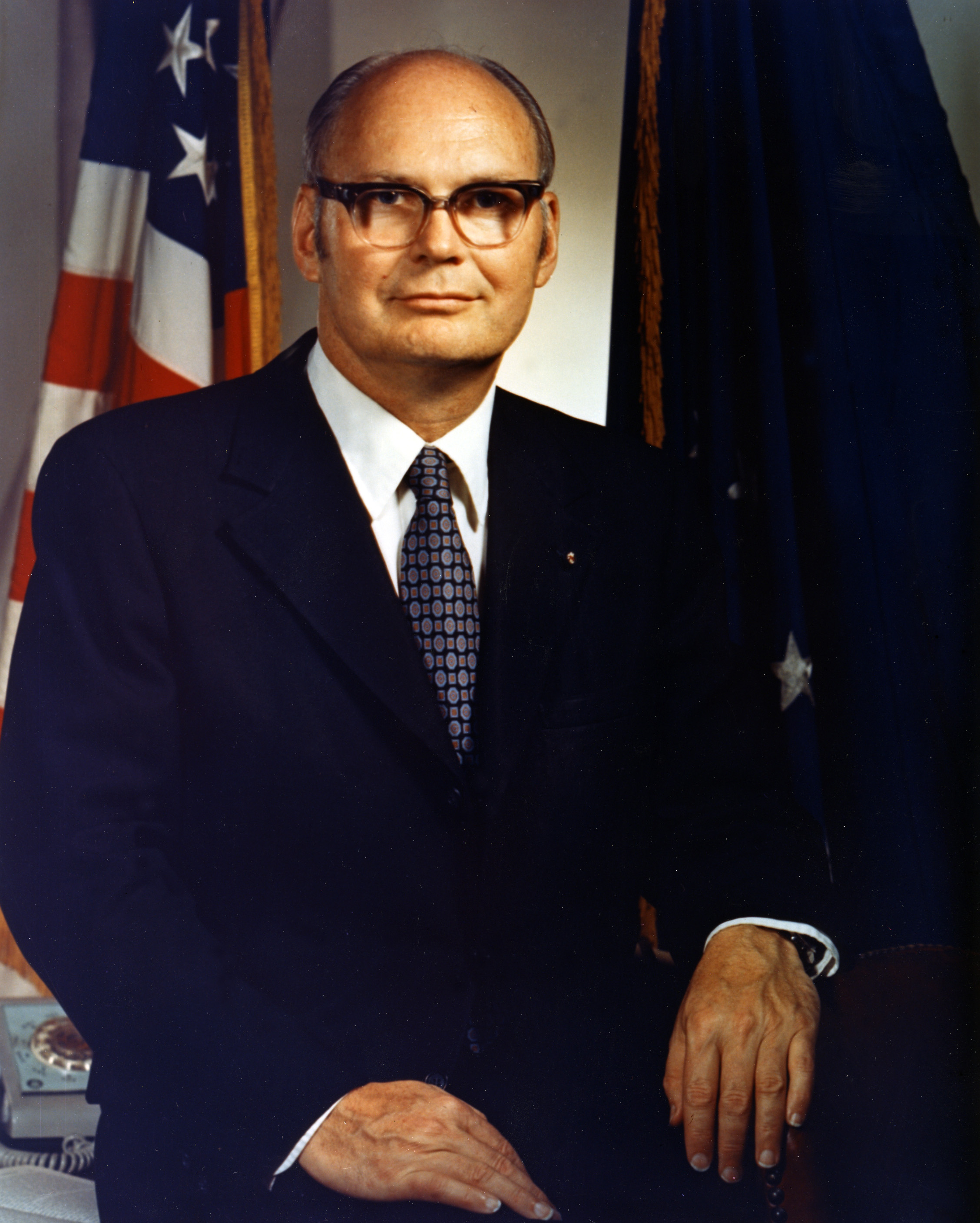

6th Administrator of the Federal Aviation Administration
- In office November 24, 1975 – April 1, 1977
- President: Gerald Ford; Jimmy Carter
- Preceded by: Alexander Butterfield
- Succeeded by: Langhorne Bond

10th United States Secretary of the Air Force
- In office May 15, 1973 – November 23, 1975; Acting: May 15, 1973 – July 19, 1973
- President: Richard Nixon; Gerald Ford
- Preceded by: Robert Seamans
- Succeeded by: Thomas C. Reed

Director of the National Reconnaissance Office
- In office March 17, 1969 – December 20, 1973
- President: Richard Nixon
- Preceded by: Alexander H. Flax
- Succeeded by: James W. Plummer

Personal details
- Born: John Luther McLucas; August 22, 1920 Fayetteville, North Carolina, U.S.
- Died: December 1, 2002 (aged 82) Alexandria, Virginia, U.S.
- Education: Davidson College (BS); Tulane University (MS); Pennsylvania State University, University Park (PhD)

John Luther McLucas (August 22, 1920 – December 1, 2002) was United States Secretary of the Air Force from 1973 to 1975, becoming Secretary of the Air Force on July 19, 1973. He had been Acting Secretary of the Air Force since May 15, 1973, and Under Secretary of the Air Force since March 1969. Before he was appointed Under Secretary, he was president and chief executive officer of MITRE Corporation, of Bedford, Massachusetts, and McLean, Virginia.

McLucas was born in Fayetteville, North Carolina. He attended public schools in McColl and Latta, South Carolina, graduating from Latta High School in 1937. He received a bachelor of science degree from Davidson College in 1941, a master of science degree in physics from Tulane University in 1943, and his doctorate in physics from Pennsylvania State University in 1950.

During World War II, he served as an officer in the United States Navy from 1943 to 1946. After one year at the Air Force Cambridge Research Center in Cambridge, Massachusetts, he enrolled at Pennsylvania State University.

From 1950 to 1957, he was vice president and technical director of Haller, Raymond and Brown Inc., an electronics firm at State College, Pennsylvania. In 1958 he was made president of HRB-Singer Inc. He joined the Department of Defense in May 1962 and served as Deputy Director of Defense Research and Engineering (Tactical Warfare Programs).

He was appointed as assistant secretary general for scientific affairs at NATO Headquarters in Paris, France, two years later. In 1966 he became president of MITRE Corp., where he remained until he was appointed undersecretary of the Air Force on March 17, 1969.

From 1969 through 1973, McLucas also served as director of the National Reconnaissance Office, working directly for the secretary of defense with support from the Central Intelligence Agency.

In November 1975, President Gerald Ford swore in Dr. McLucas as the eighth administrator of the Federal Aviation Administration.

McLucas was the author of numerous scientific articles and holds ten U.S. patents. He was the founder or co-founder of several small businesses and was active in civic affairs in Pennsylvania and Massachusetts.

He was elected a fellow of the Institute of Electrical and Electronics Engineers in 1962; associate fellow of the American Institute of Aeronautics and Astronautics in 1971; and member of the National Academy of Engineering in 1969. He received the Department of Defense Medal for Distinguished Public Service in 1964, and first bronze palm in 1973; and the Air Force Exceptional Service Award in May 1973.

He was a member of the Chief Executives Forum; American Physical Society; Operations Research Society of America; and of several honorary societies, including Sigma Pi Sigma and Sigma Xi. He was also a member of the Defense Science Board, Air Force Scientific Advisory Board, and the Young Presidents Organization.

McLucas died on December 1, 2002.

Business positions
Preceded by C. W. Halligan	President of MITRE; 1966–1969	Succeeded by Robert Everett
Government offices
Preceded by Alexander H. Flax	Director of the National Reconnaissance Office; 1969–1973	Succeeded by James W. Plummer
Preceded by Townsend Hoopes	United States Under Secretary of the Air Force; 1969–1973	Succeeded by James W. Plummer
Preceded by Robert Seamans	Secretary of the Air Force; 1973–1975	Succeeded by James W. Plummer; Acting
Preceded by Alexander Butterfield	Administrator of the Federal Aviation Administration; 1975–1977	Succeeded by Langhorne Bond
