= John C. Stetson =

American government administrator

John Stetson
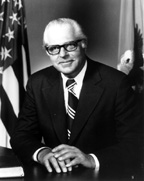

12th United States Secretary of the Air Force
- In office April 6, 1977 – May 18, 1979
- President: Jimmy Carter
- Preceded by: Thomas C. Reed
- Succeeded by: Hans Mark

Personal details
- Born: John Charles Stetson; September 6, 1920 Chicago, Illinois, U.S.
- Died: August 1, 2007 (aged 86) Lake Forest, Illinois, U.S.
- Resting place: Lake Forest Cemetery
- Education: Massachusetts Institute of Technology (BS); Northwestern University (attended)

John Charles Stetson (September 6, 1920 – August 1, 2007) was an American government administrator. He served as the Secretary of the Air Force between 1977 and 1979.

== Biography ==
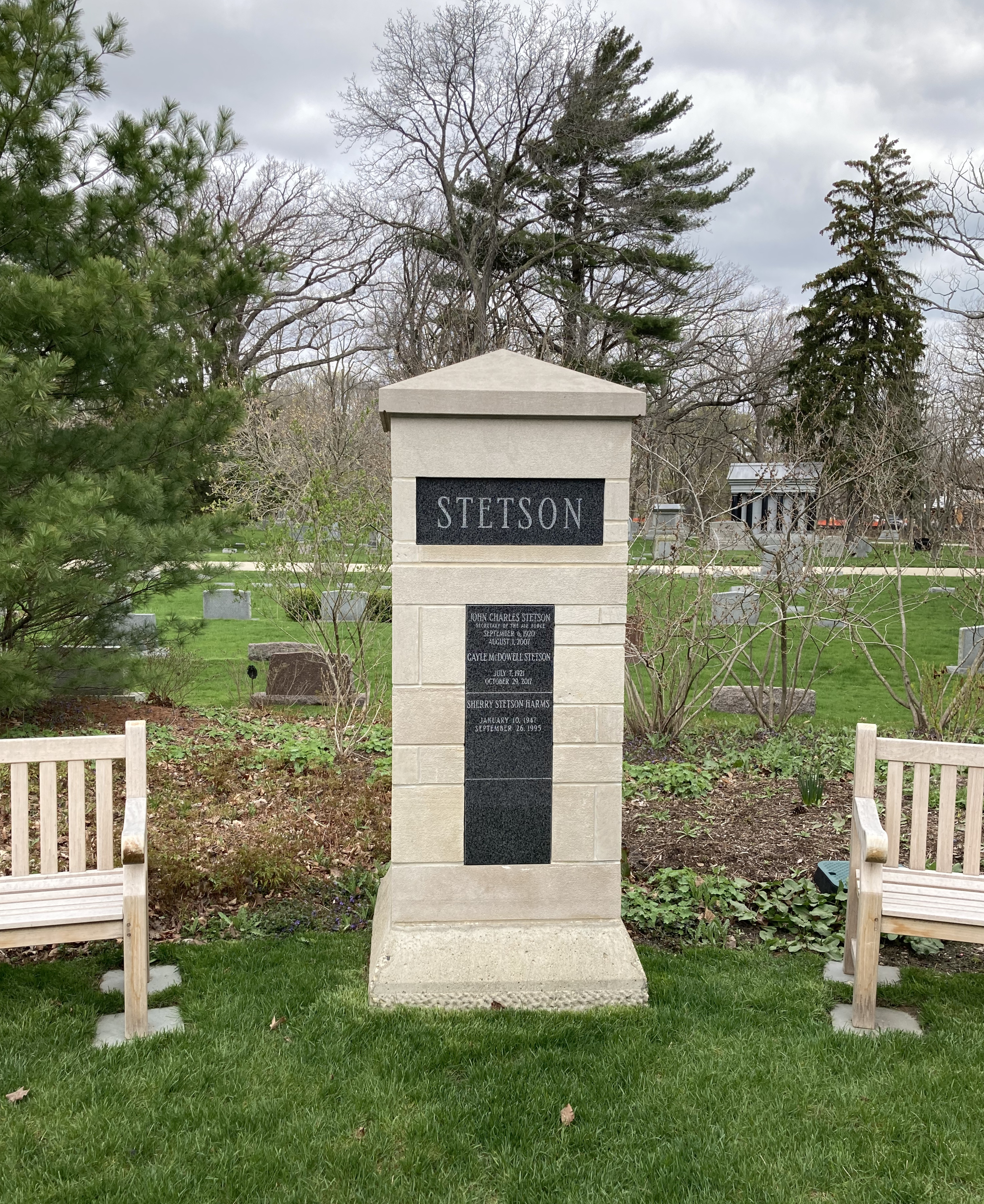
Stetson's grave at Lake Forest Cemetery

Stetson received a bachelor's degree in aeronautical engineering from the Massachusetts Institute of Technology in 1943 and entered into the engineering trades. During World War II, he served as a communications officer with the U.S. Navy. After the war, he returned to engineering work before taking a consultancy position with Booz Allen Hamilton in 1951. Stetson became president of the Houston Post publishing company in 1963. At the time of his appointment as Secretary of the Air Force, he was the head of office products supplier A.B. Dick Company.

Stetson died at his home in Lake Forest, Illinois, and was buried at Lake Forest Cemetery.

Government offices
| Preceded by Thomas C. Reed | United States Secretary of the Air Force; 1977–1979 | Succeeded by Hans Mark |
