= Department of Defense Distinguished Civilian Service Award =

United States civilian award

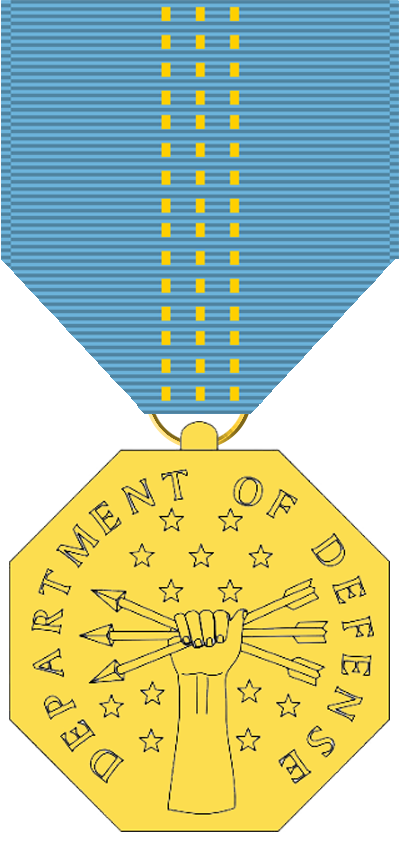
- Ribbon of the medal
- Type: Civilian Medal
- Country: United States
- Presented by: United States Department of Defense
- Eligibility: Career DoD civilian employees
- Ribbon

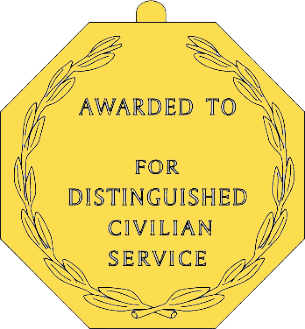
- Reverse

Precedence
- Next (lower): Secretary of Defense Meritorious Civilian Service Award

The Department of Defense Distinguished Civilian Service Award is the highest civilian award given by the United States Department of Defense. This award and accompanying Distinguished Civilian Service Medal is the department's highest award given to career DoD civilian employees whose careers reflect exceptional devotion to duty and whose contributions to the efficiency, economy, or other improvements in DoD operations are of a significantly broad scope. This award has been bestowed annually to approximately 7 to 10 awardees (about 0.001%) of the DoD civilian workforce since the 1950's.

== First recipient ==
Originally, the Distinguished Civilian Service Medal was awarded by United States Department of War for work in the intelligence service. Earl H. Pritchard was the first recipient of the award for his service from 1942 to 1945 when he was a civilian analyst with military intelligence during the Second World War.

== See also ==
- Awards and decorations of the United States government
