= Chief Scientist of the United States Air Force =

Most senior science & technology representative in the US Air Force

Chief Scientist of the Air Force
- Headquarters Air Force Identification Badge
- Incumbent; Vacant since 2024
- Inaugural holder: Dr. Ivan Alexander Getting

The chief scientist of the Air Force is the most senior science and technology representative in the United States Department of the Air Force. The most recent chief scientist of the United States Air Force was Victoria Coleman, sworn in on April 6, 2021 through July 12, 2024.

== Roles and responsibilities ==
The Chief Scientist of the Air Force has several roles and responsibilities, including:

- Serves as chief science and technology adviser to the chief of staff of the Air Force, the chief of space operations, and the secretary of the Air Force
- Provides assessments on a wide range of scientific and technical issues affecting the Air Force mission
- Identifies and analyzes technical issues and brings them to the attention of Air Force leaders, and interacts with other Air Staff principals, operational commanders, combatant commands, acquisition, and science and technology communities to address cross-organizational technical issues and solutions
- Interacts with other services and the Office of the Secretary of Defense on issues affecting the Air Force in-house technical enterprise
- Serves on the Steering Committee and Senior Review Group of the Air Force Scientific Advisory Board.
- Principal science and technology representative of the Air Force to the civilian scientific and engineering community and to the public at large

== Products of the Office of the Chief Scientist ==
The Office of the Chief Scientist has conducted several strategic studies including:

- Technology Horizons
- Energy Horizons
- Cyber Vision 2025, summarized in the Armed Forces Journal
- Global Horizons

== Chronological list of Chief Scientists of the Air Force ==
No.	Picture	Name	Term of Office	Doctorate	Chief of Staff	Secretary	Military Assistant
38		Vacant			Kenneth S. Wilsbach	Troy E. Meink	Col(s) Melanie Mace (2026-) Col Timothy W.C. Zens (2024-2026)
37	Dr Victoria Coleman	Dr. Victoria Coleman	April 6, 2021 – July 12, 2024	University of Manchester, Computer Science, 1988	Charles Q. Brown Jr.	John P. Roth	Col David Montminy (2022-2024); Col Jason Vap (2021-2022); Col Mario Serna (2019-2021)
37	Dr Victoria Coleman	Dr. Victoria Coleman	April 6, 2021 – July 12, 2024	University of Manchester, Computer Science, 1988	David W. Allvin	Frank Kendall III	Col David Montminy (2022-2024); Col Jason Vap (2021-2022); Col Mario Serna (2019-2021)
36		Dr. Richard J. Joseph	January 2018 – April 5, 2021	University of Texas at Austin, Physics, 1979	Charles Q. Brown Jr.	Barbara Barrett	Col Mario Serna (2019-2021); Col Michelle Ewy (2016-2019)
36		Dr. Richard J. Joseph	January 2018 – April 5, 2021	University of Texas at Austin, Physics, 1979	David L. Goldfein	Heather Wilson	Col Mario Serna (2019-2021); Col Michelle Ewy (2016-2019)
35		Dr. Greg Zacharias	June 2015 – January 2018	Massachusetts Institute of Technology, Cambridge, Instrumentation, Aeronautics and Astronautics, 1977	Mark Welsh	Deborah Lee James	Col Michelle Ewy (2016–2019); Col Anne L. Clark (2015–2016)
34		Dr. Mica Endsley	June 2013 – May 2015	University of Southern California, Industrial & Systems Engineering, 1990	Mark Welsh	Deborah Lee James	Col Anne L. Clark (2014-2015); Col James (Monty) Greer (2013-2014)
33		Dr. Mark T. Maybury	October 2010– May 2013	University of Cambridge, Computer Science (Artificial Intelligence), 1991	Mark Welsh	Michael B. Donley	Col James (Monty) Greer (2012–2013); Col Rod Miller (2011–2012); Col Eric Silkowski (2010–2011)
33		Dr. Mark T. Maybury	October 2010– May 2013	University of Cambridge, Computer Science (Artificial Intelligence), 1991	Norton A. Schwartz	Michael B. Donley	Col James (Monty) Greer (2012–2013); Col Rod Miller (2011–2012); Col Eric Silkowski (2010–2011)
32		Dr. Werner J. A. Dahm	October 2008– September 30, 2010	California Institute of Technology, Aeronautics, 1985	Norton A. Schwartz	Michael B. Donley	Col Eric Silkowski (2008–2010)
31		Dr. Mark J. Lewis	October 2004 – October 2008	Massachusetts Institute of Technology, Aeronautics & Astronautics, 1988	Norton A. Schwartz	Michael B. Donley	Col Robert Fredell (2006–2008)
31		Dr. Mark J. Lewis	October 2004 – October 2008	Massachusetts Institute of Technology, Aeronautics & Astronautics, 1988	T. Michael Moseley	Michael Wynne	Col Robert Fredell (2006–2008)
31		Dr. Mark J. Lewis	October 2004 – October 2008	Massachusetts Institute of Technology, Aeronautics & Astronautics, 1988	John P. Jumper	James G. Roche	Col Daniel DeForest (2004–2006)
30		Dr. Alexander H. Levis	2001–2004	Massachusetts Institute of Technology, Mechanical Engineering (Control Systems), 1968	John P. Jumper	James G. Roche	Col Daniel DeForest (2004); Col John Bedford (Sept. 2001 to 2003); Col Donald Erbschloe (-Dec 2001)
29		Dr. Louis S. Metzger	1999–2001	Massachusetts Institute of Technology, Electrical Engineering, 1975	Michael E. Ryan	James G. Roche; Lawrence J. Delaney; F. Whitten Peters	Col Donald Erbschloe (1998–2001)
28		Dr. Daniel E. Hastings	1997–1999	Massachusetts Institute of Technology, Plasma Physics, 1980; (B.A. Oxford in Mathematics)	Michael E. Ryan	F. Whitten Peters	Col Donald Erbschloe (1998–2001)
27		Dr. Ed Feigenbaum	1994–1997	Carnegie Institute of Technology (now Carnegie Mellon University)	Ronald R. Fogleman	Sheila E. Widnall	Col Harvey Dahljelm (1994–1998)
27		Dr. Ed Feigenbaum	1994–1997	Carnegie Institute of Technology (now Carnegie Mellon University)	Merrill A. McPeak	Sheila E. Widnall	Col Harvey Dahljelm (1994–1998)
26		Dr. George R. Abrahamson	1991–1994		Merrill A. McPeak	Merrill A. McPeak; Michael B. Donley; Donald B. Rice	Col James Whiting (1991–1994)
25		Dr. Robert W. Selden	1988–1991		John M. Loh; Michael Dugan; Larry D. Welch	Donald B. Rice; John J. Welch, Jr. James F. McGovern	Col Dan Heitz (1988–1989) and Col John Woody (1989–1991)
24		Dr. Harold W. Sorenson	1985–1988	UCLA, Electrical Engineering, 1966	Larry D. Welch; Charles A. Gabriel	Edward C. Aldridge Jr. Russell A. Rourkee; Verne Orr	Col Robert Hovde (1983–1987) and Col Robert Lancaster (1987–1988)
23		Allen R. Stubberud	1983–1985	UCLA, Engineering	Charles A. Gabriel	Verne Orr	Col Robert Hovde (1983–1987)
22		Edwin B. Stear	1979–1982		Lew Allen Jr.	Hans Mark	Col Michael Mottern (1982–1983); Col Robert Bannach (1981–1982)
21		Harry L. Van Trees	1978–1979		Lew Allen Jr.	John C. Stetson	Col Robert Dundervill Jr. (1977–1981)
20		Fumio Robert Naka	1975–1978		David C. Jones	John C. Stetson; Thomas C. Reed; James W. Plummer	BGen Charles Cabell Jr. (1976–1977)
19		Dr. Michael I. Yarymovych	1973–1975	B. Eng Sc. in Aeronautical Engineering, New York University 1955, D Eng SC, 1960 Columbia University, Institute of Flight Structures	David C. Jones; George S. Brown; John Dale Ryan	James W. Plummer; John L. McLucas	Col James Strub (1974–1976)
18		Dr. Eugene E. Covert	1972–1973	MIT PhD Magnetohydrodynamics	John D. Ryan	Robert C. Seamans, Jr.	Col Thaddeus Welch Jr. (1971–1974)
17		Dr. James W. Mar	1970–1972	MIT Undergraduate 1941; PhD MIT, Civil Engineering	John D. Ryan	Robert C. Seamans, Jr.	LtCol Frank Attinger Jr. (1966–1971)
16		John J. Welch, Jr.	1969–1970	Undergraduate MIT Mechanical Engineering 1951	John D. Ryan	Robert C. Seamans, Jr.	LtCol Frank Attinger Jr. (1966–1971)
15		John C. Fisher	1968–1969	Undergraduate Ohio State, Physics, MIT PhD	John P. McConnell	Robert C. Seamans, Jr. Harold Brown	LtCol Frank Attinger Jr. (1966–1971)
14		Robert H. Cannon, Jr.	1966–1968	University of Rochester 1944 PhD Mechanical Engineering MIT 1950	John P. McConnell	Harold Brown	LtCol Frank Attinger Jr. (1966–1971)
13		Robert G. Loewy	1965–1966	RPI, MIT Masters 1948	John P. McConnell	Harold Brown	Col Mike Zubon (1962–1966)
12		Dr. Winston R. Markey	1964–1965	BS Aeronautical Engineering, MIT, 1951, PhD MIT Aero Instrumentation	John P. McConnell; Curtis E. LeMay	Eugene M. Zuckert	Col Mike Zubon (1962–1966)
11		Dr. Robert W. Buchheim	1963–1964		Curtis E. LeMay	Eugene M. Zuckert	Col Mike Zubon (1962–1966)
10		Dr. Launor F. Carter	1962–1963	Physiology	Curtis E. LeMay	Eugene M. Zuckert	Col Mike Zubon (1962–1966)
9		Dr. Leonard S. Sheingold	1961–1962		Curtis E. LeMay	Eugene M. Zuckert	Col Loyd Jensen (1961–1962)
8		Alexander H. Flax	1959–1961	New York University, Aeronautical Engineering, 1940	Thomas D. White	Dudley C. Sharp; James H. Douglas, Jr.	Col David Pearsall (1957–1961)
7		Joseph V. Charyk	1959	Univ of Alberta, Engineering Physics 1942; California Institute of Technology PhD 1946	Thomas D. White	James H. Douglas, Jr.	Col David Pearsall (1957–1961)
6		George E. Valley Jr.	1957–1958	University of Rochester, Physics, 1939	Thomas D. White	James H. Douglas, Jr.	Col David Pearsall (1957–1961)
5		Courtland D. Perkins	1956–1957	M.S. MIT 1941; Princeton Honorary PhD, 2001	Nathan F. Twining	James H. Douglas, Jr. Donald A. Quarles	Col John Taylor (1954–1957)
4		Dr. Horton Guyford Stever	1955–1956	California Institute of Technology, Physics, 1941	Nathan F. Twining	Donald A. Quarles; Harold E. Talbott	Col John Taylor (1954–1957)
3		Dr. Chalmers W. Sherwin	1954–1955	University of Chicago, Experimental Physics 1940 (with Arthur Dempster)	Nathan F. Twining	Harold E. Talbott	Col John Taylor (1954–1957)
2		David T. Griggs	1951–1952	Junior Fellow in Geology at University of Harvard	Hoyt S. Vandenberg	Thomas K. Finletter	Col Theodore Walkowicz(1950–1954)
1		Dr. Louis N. Ridenour reported to MGen Gordon P. Saville DCS/D	1950–1951	California Institute of Technology, Physics, 1936	Hoyt S. Vandenberg	Thomas K. Finletter	Col Peter Shenk (1950)
–		Gen James Harold "Jimmy" Doolittle (Special Assistant for Scientific Matters)	1951	MIT Sc.D. in Aeronautics, June 1925	Hoyt S. Vandenberg	Thomas K. Finletter	
–		Dr. Ivan Alexander Getting (Special Assistant for Evaluation)	1950	University of Oxford (Rhodes Scholar), Astrophysics, 1935	Hoyt S. Vandenberg	William S. Symington	
