= Mark J. Lewis =

American aerospace engineer and defense executive (born 1962)

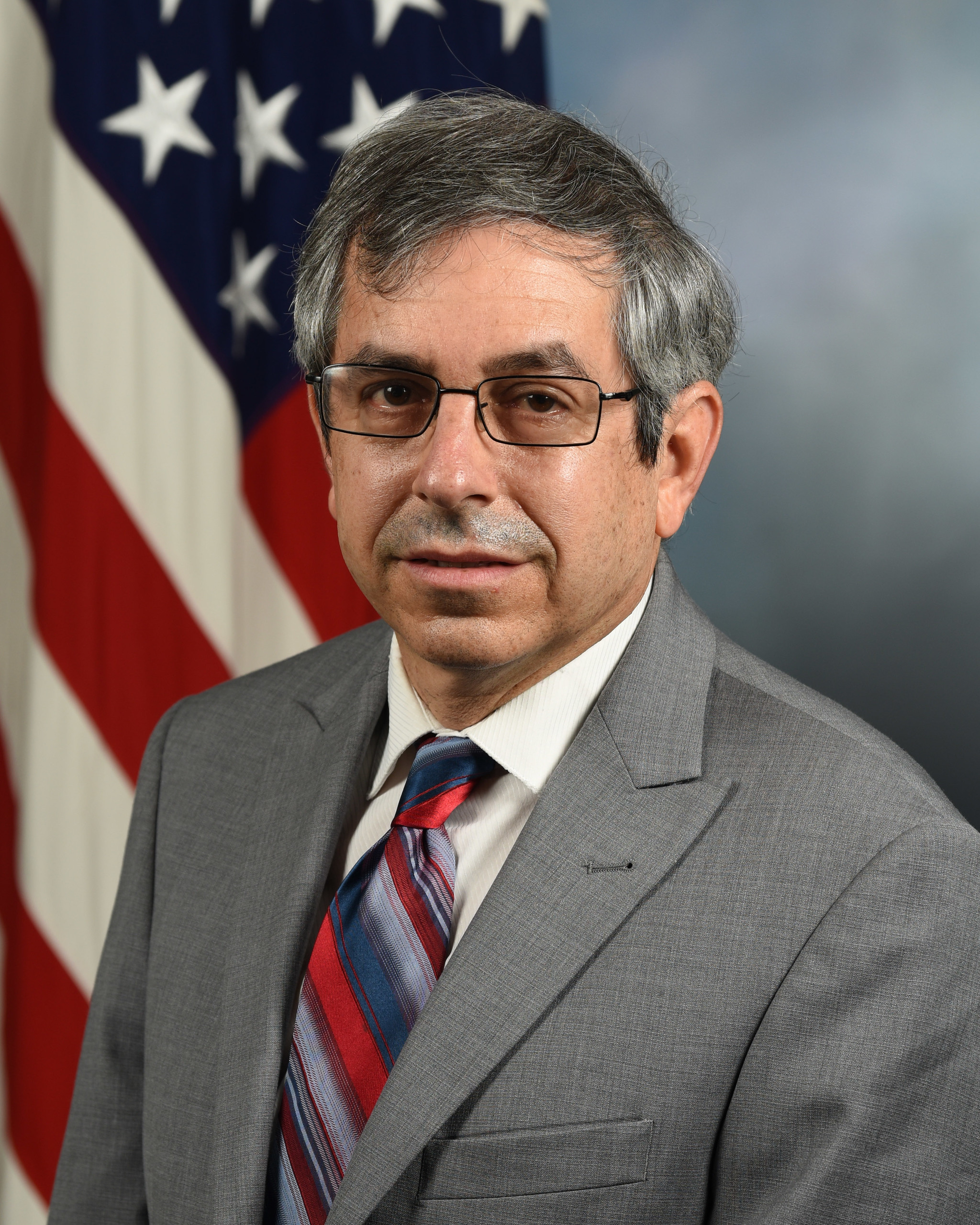
- Mark J. Lewis
- Born: 1962 (age 63–64); Yonkers, New York, United States
- Occupation: Aerospace engineer
- Known for: Former Chief Scientist of the United States Air Force

Mark J. Lewis (born 1962) is an American aerospace engineer and defense executive with expertise in hypersonics. He is the president and chief executive officer of the Purdue Applied Research Institute (PARI), a nonprofit applied‑research organization affiliated with Purdue University.

Lewis previously served as executive director of the National Defense Industrial Association’s Emerging Technologies Institute. From 2019 to 2021, he served in the United States Department of Defense as Director of Defense Research and Engineering for Modernization and, in 2020, as acting Deputy Under Secretary of Defense for Research and Engineering.

From 2004 to 2008, Lewis served as Chief Scientist of the United States Air Force and was the longest‑serving individual to hold that position. In that role, he acted as the principal scientific adviser to Air Force leadership, providing assessments on a broad range of scientific and technical issues. His areas of focus included energy, sustainment, long‑range strike technologies, advanced propulsion systems, and workforce development.

Lewis served on the Steering Committee and Senior Review Group of the United States Air Force Scientific Advisory Board (SAB) and acted as a principal science and technology representative of the Air Force to the civilian scientific and engineering community.

== Early life and education ==
Lewis was born in Yonkers, New York, in 1962. He earned two Bachelor of Science degrees, in aeronautics and astronautics and in earth and planetary science, followed by a Master of Science and Doctor of Science in aeronautics and astronautics, from the Massachusetts Institute of Technology.

== Career ==
Lewis joined the faculty of the Aerospace Engineering Department at the University of Maryland, College Park in 1988. His academic work has included research and teaching in hypersonic aerodynamics, advanced propulsion, and space vehicle design and optimization. His research spanned the aerospace flight regime from conventional jet propulsion to atmospheric entry at hypervelocity speeds and contributed to multiple NASA and Department of Defense programs focused on high‑speed vehicles and spacecraft design.

He founded the Center for Hypersonic Education and Research and later led the NASA–Air Force Constellation University Institutes Project. Lewis later became professor emeritus of aerospace engineering at the University of Maryland.

Lewis served as the Willis Young Jr. Professor and Chair of the Department of Aerospace Engineering at the University of Maryland from 2009 to 2012 and as president of the American Institute of Aeronautics and Astronautics from 2010 to 2011.

From 2012 to 2019, Lewis served as director of the Science and Technology Policy Institute at the Institute for Defense Analyses.

Lewis is the author of more than 280 technical publications and has served as research adviser to more than 60 graduate students. He has participated in numerous advisory boards and review panels for the Air Force and Department of Defense, including multiple terms on the Air Force Scientific Advisory Board.

== Career chronology ==
- 1988–1999: Assistant Professor, later Associate Professor, Aerospace Engineering, University of Maryland, College Park
- 1999–2004: Professor and Associate Chair, Aerospace Engineering, University of Maryland, College Park
- 2002–2004: Director, Space Vehicle Technology Institute
- 2004–2008: Chief Scientist of the United States Air Force
- 2009–2012: Chair, Department of Aerospace Engineering, University of Maryland, College Park
- 2010–2011: President, American Institute of Aeronautics and Astronautics
- 2012–2019: Director, Science and Technology Policy Institute, Institute for Defense Analyses
- 2019–2021: Director of Defense Research and Engineering for Modernization; Acting Deputy Under Secretary of Defense for Research and Engineering
- 2023–present: President and Chief Executive Officer, Purdue Applied Research Institute

== Recognition ==
Lewis is an honorary fellow of the American Institute of Aeronautics and Astronautics and a fellow of the American Society of Mechanical Engineers and the Royal Aeronautical Society. He is an academician of the International Academy of Astronautics.

He received the Theodore von Kármán Award from the Air Force Association in 2018. In 2025, the American Institute of Aeronautics and Astronautics announced Lewis as the recipient of its Distinguished Service Award (2026).
