= Mark Maybury =

American computer scientist

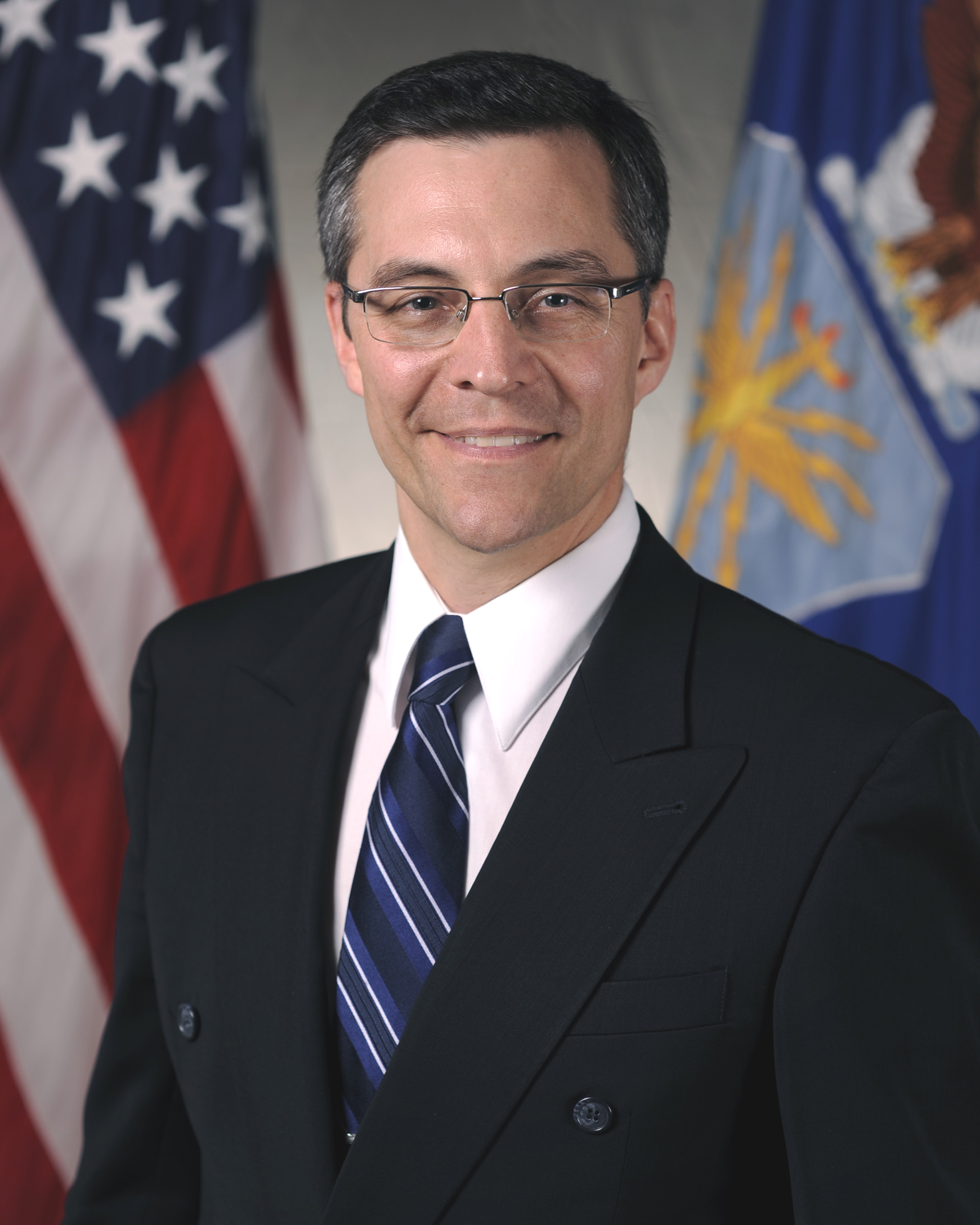
- Official portrait, 2010

Chief Scientist of the United States Air Force
- In office October 2010 – July 2013
- Preceded by: Werner J. A. Dahm
- Succeeded by: Mica Endsley

Personal details
- Born: December 13, 1964 (age 61) Lowell, Massachusetts, U.S.
- Education: College of the Holy Cross (BA); University of Cambridge (MPhil, PhD); Rensselaer Polytechnic Institute (MBA)

Military service
- Branch/service: United States Air Force
- Years of service: 1986–1990
- Battles/wars: Gulf War

Mark Thomas Maybury (born December 13, 1964) is an American computer scientist who served as Chief Scientist of the United States Air Force from 2010 to 2013. As of 2022, he is the vice-president of commercialization, engineering and technology at Lockheed Martin. Maybury was formerly the chief technology officer (CTO) of Stanley Black & Decker.

== Early life and education ==
Marybury was born at Lowell General Hospital in Lowell, Massachusetts, on December 13, 1964. His family was middle-class. He was educated at Chelmsford High School, graduating in 1982 as class vice-president. Maybury then attended the College of the Holy Cross, becoming a member of its Air Force Reserve Officer Training Corps (AFROTC).

In 1986, Maybury graduated from Holy Cross as valedictorian with a Bachelor of Arts (B.A.) in mathematics with membership in Phi Beta Kappa, Pi Mu Epsilon, and Alpha Sigma Nu. He was named the college's Fenwick Scholar, its highest academic honor, and was commissioned as a second lieutenant in the United States Air Force. His 1985 undergraduate senior thesis was titled "Artificial Intelligence: Generalized Expert Systems".

After being awarded a Rotary Scholarship, Maybury pursued graduate studies in computer speech and language processing at Cambridge University in England, earning a Master of Philosophy (M.Phil.) in 1987 while simultaneously being stationed at RAF Alconbury. He also received a Master of Business Administration (M.B.A.) from the Rensselaer Polytechnic Institute in 1989.

Maybury returned to Cambridge and earned a Doctor of Philosophy (Ph.D.) in artificial intelligence in 1991. His dissertation was titled "Planning multisentential English text using communicative acts".

== Career ==
From 1987 to 1990, Maybury was a research chief at the Rome Laboratory of Griffiss Air Force Base in Rome, New York. He then was group leader of Intelligence Information Systems and AI at the MITRE Corporation in 1990–1992, later becoming the department head of Advanced Information Systems Technology at the corporation from 1992 to 1995.

In 2010, Werner Dahm recommended Maybury to Air Force general Norton Schwartz, who nominated him to United States Secretary of the Air Force Michael B. Donley. Donley selected Maybury as the 33rd Chief Scientist of the United States Air Force, and Maybury served in that capacity from 2010 to 2013. He was also a scientific adviser to the Chief of Staff of the Air Force and Secretary of the U.S. Air Force, providing assessments on a wide range of scientific and technical issues affecting the Air Force mission.

Maybury has been an editor or co-author of 10 books and 60 refereed publications. He is an IEEE Fellow and has been awarded several U.S. patents.

== Personal life ==
With his wife, Michelle, Maybury has three children: Zachary, Max, and Julia.

== Selected publications ==
- Maybury, Mark; Wahlster, Wolfgang (April 15, 1998). Readings in Intelligent User Interfaces. Morgan Kaufmann. ISBN 978-1558604445.
- Maybury, Mark T.; Mani, Inderjeet, eds. (July 16, 1999). Advances in Automatic Text Summarization. MIT Press. ISBN 978-0262133593.
- Maybury, Mark T.; Morey, Daryl; Thuraisingham, Bhavani, eds. (January 1, 2001). Knowledge Management: Classic and Contemporary Works. MIT Press. ISBN 978-0262133845.
