= Michael I. Yarymovych =

American businessman

- Михайло І. Яримович
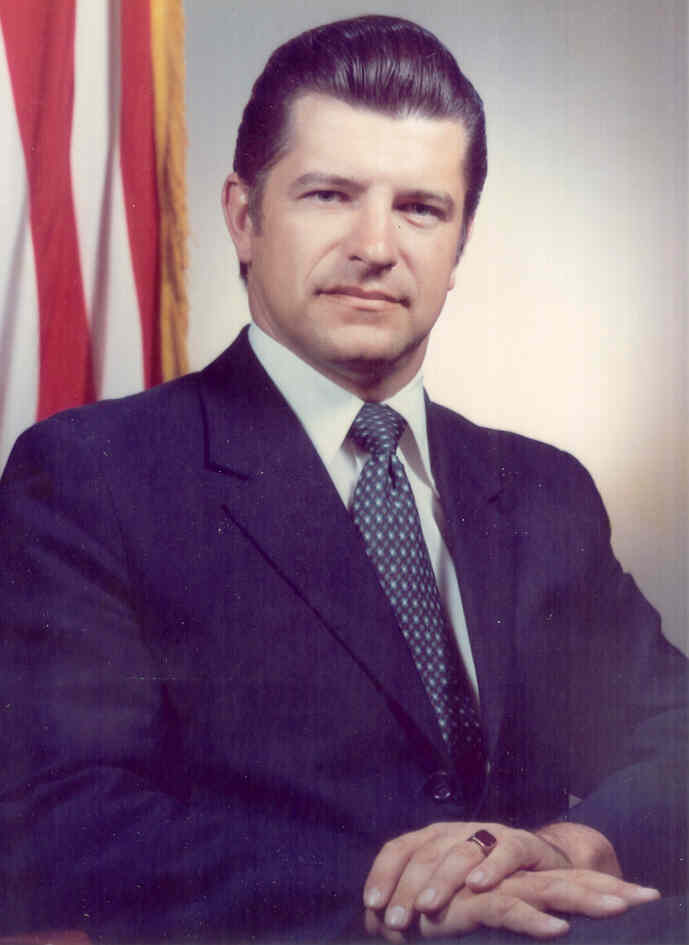
- Born: October 13, 1933 (age 92); Bialystok, Poland
- Education: New York University, Columbia University
- Occupation: Aerospace Scientist

Michael Ihor Yarymovych (Note: Ukrainian: Михайло Іванович Яримович, romanized: Mykhailo Ivanovych Yarymovych) (born October 13, 1933) is President of Sarasota Space Associates, an aerospace consultant providing services to the aerospace industry and government. He is Senior Fellow of the United States Air Force Scientific Advisory Board (SAB) and has served on numerous SAB and Defense Science Board studies.

== Early life ==
Michael was born in Poland of Ukrainian parents. The family had to move because their native city of Ternopil was ruined in WWII. It was young Michael’s experience during the Berlin Airlift in 1948 that shaped his inspiration to dedicate his life to airspace:

I was growing up in post-war Berlin, Germany. During the Soviet blockade of the city, we were supplied food and fuel by the so-called Berlin Airlift. The DC-3s that were coming in four-minute intervals to Tempelhof airport were quite a sight for a 14-year-old boy, and especially the chocolates and candy that the U.S. Air Force pilots were dropping on approach and takeoff. Right then I decided to be an aeronautical engineer to design and build these flying machines. Also, an old high school teacher gave me a book on astronomy, so I got excited about exploration of the stars.

— Michael_I._Yarymovych

The family immigrated to the United States in 1952.

== Career ==
Dr. Yarymovych completed his B. Eng Sc. in Aeronautical Engineering magna cum laude at New York University 1955, earned his M.S. degree in engineering mechanics from Columbia University and his D. Eng. Sc. in engineering mechanics also from Columbia, as a Guggenheim Fellow.

He started his engineering career in 1959 at Avco R&D Division leading projects in electric propelled space systems. In 1962 he joined NASA Headquarters as Assistant Director of Systems Engineering on the Apollo project and later moved to the Air Force as Technical Director of the Air Force Manned Orbital Laboratory, and Deputy for Requirements to the Assistant Secretary for Research and Development. In 1970 he was posted in Paris as Director of the NATO Advisory Group for Aerospace Research and Development (AGARD), which was later changed to be the NATO Research and Technology Organization (RTO), currently known as NATO Science and Technology Organization (STO). In the 1990s he was elected Chairman of AGARD and later of RTO. From 1973 to 1975 he served as the Chief Scientist of the U.S. Air Force, which was followed by a Presidential appointment to be the Assistant Administrator of the US Energy Research and Development Administration responsible for field operations of the national and government owned energy (former AEC) laboratories.

From 1991 to 1997 Dr. Yarymovych was President of the International Academy of Astronautics, of which he was vice president for Scientific Programs since 1985. He retired from the Boeing Company in 1998 as Vice President of International Technology in the Information, Space and Defense Systems organization. Prior to the merger of Rockwell International with Boeing he was Vice President and Associate Center Director of the Systems Development Center, which focused the corporation’s resources on new high technology advanced concepts requiring the skills of many divisions. He had joined Rockwell in 1977 as Vice President Engineering of the Aerospace Operations in leadership positions of programs such as the Space Shuttle, Global Positioning System and the B1B strategic aircraft.

He is a Fellow of the American Astronautical Society and Honorary Fellow of the American Institute of Aeronautics and Astronautics, where he served as president from 1982 to 1983. He was Senior Fellow of the United States Air Force Scientific Advisory Board (SAB) and has served on numerous SAB and Defense Science Board studies. He is four-time recipient of the Department of the Air Force Decoration for Exceptional Civilian Service, the service’s highest decoration; he also received the ERDA Distinguished Service Award, the Von Karman Medal from the NATO Research and Technology Organization, and the Theodore Von Karman Award from the International Academy of Astronautics. He was a member of the Air Force Studies Board until 2019, and serves on the National Academies Aeronautics and Space Engineering Board.In 2016 He was elected to the National Academy of Engineering.

He is a member of several Ukrainian learned societies. In 1992, he was elected Foreign Member of the National Academy of Sciences of Ukraine. In 2021 he received a Doctor Honoris Causa from the Ukrainian Catholic University.
