= Greg Zacharias =

American scientist

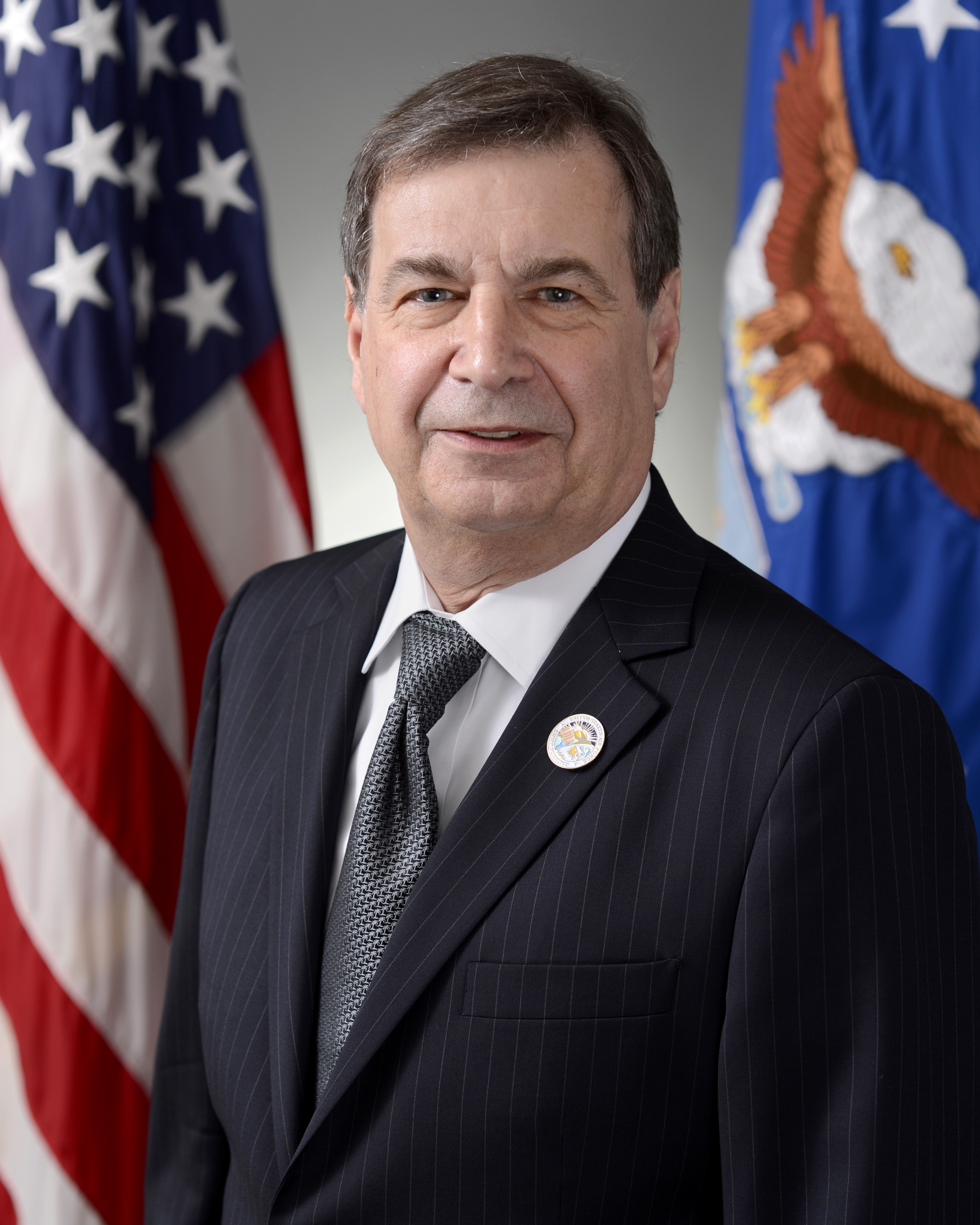
Greg Zacharias, Chief Scientist of the U.S. Air Force

Greg Zacharias was the Chief Scientist for the Director of Operational Test and Evaluation, Office of the Secretary of Defense, serving from July 2018 to 2021. Previously, he was the Chief Scientist of the United States Air Force from May 2015 to January 2018. In 2022 he transitioned from the Department of Defense to work with AI-simulation company Pasteur Labs as Director of Government Solutions.

== Education ==
In 1967, Zacharias graduated from the Massachusetts Institute of Technology in Cambridge, Massachusetts with a Bachelor of Science degree in Aeronautics and Astronautics. In 1974, he earned a Master of Science degree in Aeronautics and Astronautics from the Massachusetts Institute of Technology and earned a Doctor of Philosophy in Instrumentation, Aeronautics and Astronautics from the Massachusetts Institute of Technology in 1977.

== Career ==
From 1983 to 2015, Zacharias served as first Vice President and then President of Charles River Analytics, a research and development company that he co-founded and that applies computational intelligence technologies to decision-making.

Zacharias served on the Air Force Scientific Advisory Board for eight years, contributing to nine summer studies, most recently chairing a study on “Operating Next-Generation Remotely Piloted Aircraft for Irregular Warfare.”. He also chaired the Human System Wing Advisory Group, was a member of Air Combat Command’s Advisory Group, and served as a technical program reviewer for the Air Force Research Laboratory (in Human Effectiveness and Information Systems). He was a member of the National Research Council (NRC) Committee on Human Factors (now the Committee on Human-Systems Integration) for over ten years, supporting a number of NRC studies including one for Defense Modeling and Simulation Office evaluating the state-of-the-art in military human behavior models, and co-chairing a follow-up study entitled “Organizational Models: from Individuals to Societies,” which presents a roadmap for future DoD science and technology investments in this area. He has served on the DoD Human Systems Technology Area Review and Assessment (TARA) Panel.
