= John J. Welch Jr. =

American scientist (1930–2010)

Jack Welch

United States Secretary of the Air Force
- Acting
- In office April 29, 1989 – May 21, 1989
- President: George H. W. Bush
- Preceded by: James F. McGovern (acting)
- Succeeded by: Donald Rice

Assistant Secretary of the Air Force for Acquisition
- In office October 1987 – April 1992
- President: Ronald Reagan; George H. W. Bush
- Preceded by: Daniel Rak (acting)
- Succeeded by: G. Kim Wincup

Chief Scientist of the United States Air Force
- In office 1969–1970
- President: Richard Nixon
- Preceded by: James W. Mar
- Succeeded by: John Fisher

Personal details
- Born: John James Welch Jr. August 23, 1930 Cambridge, Massachusetts, U.S.
- Died: October 8, 2010 (aged 80) Plano, Texas, U.S.
- Education: Massachusetts Institute of Technology (BS)

John James "Jack" Welch Jr. (August 23, 1930 – October 8, 2010) was a United States scientist and businessman who served as Assistant Secretary of the Air Force (Acquisition) from 1987 to 1992.

== Biography ==
Welch was born in Cambridge, Massachusetts on August 23, 1930. He was educated at the Massachusetts Institute of Technology, graduating with a B.S. in 1951.

After college, Welch got a job with Vought (which was acquired by Ling-Temco-Vought in 1961). From 1965 to 1970, he was vice president of the missiles and space division of LTV Aerospace. In this capacity, from 1965 to 1970, he was also the Chief Scientist of the United States Air Force. In 1970, he became LTV Aerospace's Vice President (Programs), a position he held until 1974, when he was named corporate vice president. He was then promoted to Senior Vice President of LTV Aerospace in 1975, holding this position until 1985.

On July 1, 1987, President of the United States Ronald Reagan nominated Welch to be Assistant Secretary of the Air Force (Acquisition). President George H. W. Bush chose to keep Welch in this position, and he served until the end of the Bush Administration. He was briefly Acting United States Secretary of the Air Force, from April 29, 1989 until May 21, 1989.

After leaving government service in 1992, Welch served on the Board of Directors of a number of corporations, including MBDA-US, Verint Systems, Serco, Dynacs Military & Defense, Meggitt, and Wilcoxon Research.

Welch died on October 8, 2010, aged 80, in Plano, Texas.

Government offices
Preceded by James W. Mar	Chief Scientist of the United States Air Force; 1969–1970	Succeeded by John Fisher
Preceded by Daniel Rak; Acting	Assistant Secretary of the Air Force for Acquisition; 1987–1992	Succeeded by G. Kim Wincup
Preceded by James F. McGovern; Acting	United States Secretary of the Air Force; Acting; 1989	Succeeded by Donald Rice
