= Patrick T. Henry =

American government official

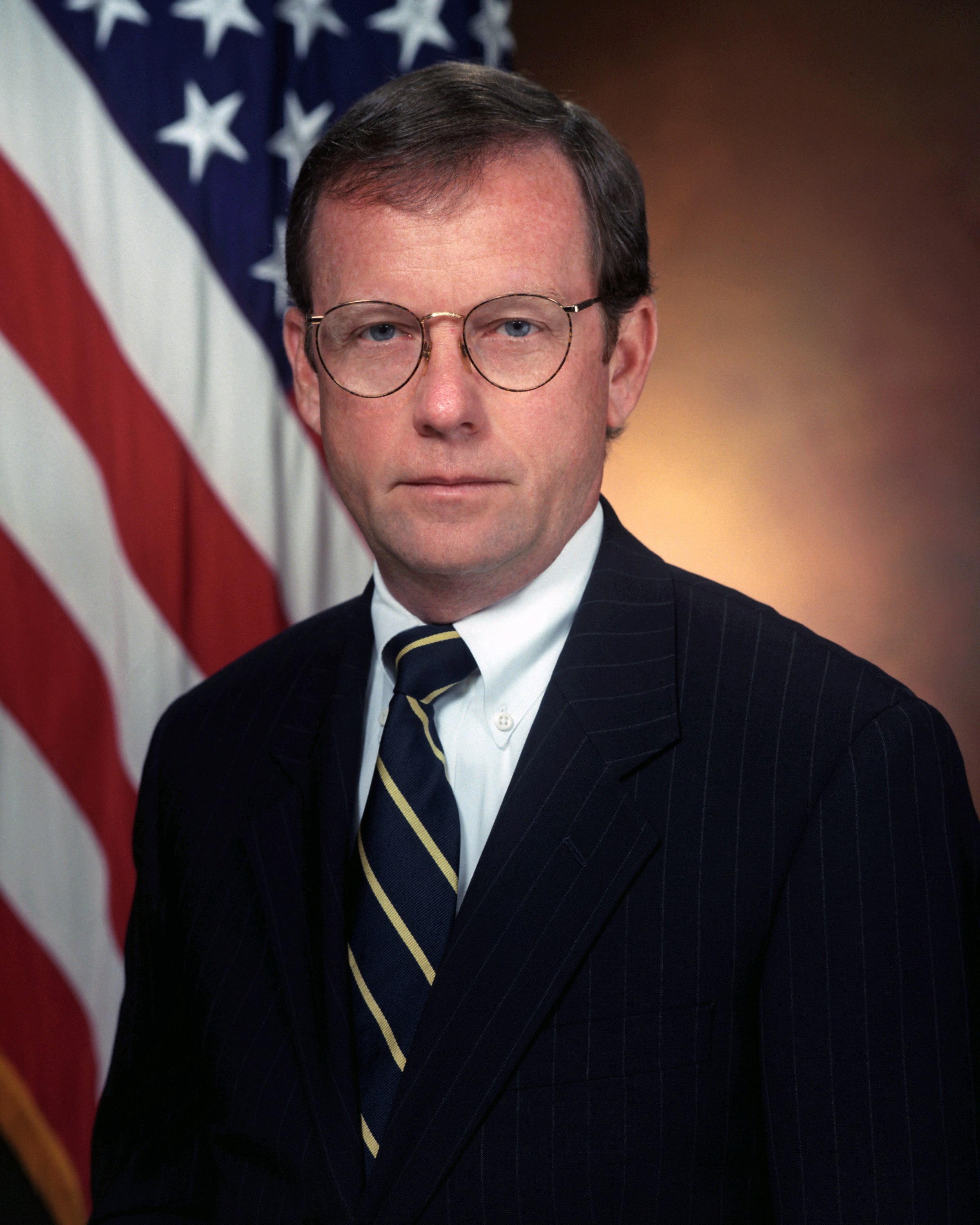

Assistant Secretary of the Army (Manpower and Reserve Affairs)
- In office June 10, 1998 – January 20, 2001
- President: Bill Clinton
- Preceded by: Sara E. Lister
- Succeeded by: Reginald J. Brown

Personal details
- Born: November 7, 1950 (age 75) Brooklyn, New York, U.S.
- Education: United States Naval Academy

Military service
- Allegiance: United States
- Branch/service: United States Marine Corps
- Years of service: 1972–1992
- Rank: Lieutenant Colonel

Patrick Timothy Henry (born November 7, 1950, in Brooklyn, New York City) was United States Assistant Secretary of the Army (Manpower and Reserve Affairs) from 1998 to 2001.

== Marine Corps ==
Patrick T. Henry was educated at the United States Naval Academy, graduating with a B.S. degree in June 1972. He then spent the next twenty years serving in the United States Marine Corps. Henry earned a master's degree in Public Service from Western Kentucky University in May 1983 and an M.A. degree in International Relations from the Fletcher School of Law and Diplomacy in May 1985. As a marine, he held command and staff positions in Marine Corps tank units, commanded an Army tank training company at Fort Knox, Kentucky, and served on the staff of two Secretaries of Defense. Henry left the Marine Corps in 1992 having attained the rank of lieutenant colonel.

== American Red Cross ==
In 1992, Henry became Chief of Staff of the American Red Cross. He only held this position for a year and in 1993, he joined the professional staff of the United States Senate Committee on Armed Services.

== Asst Secretary of the Army ==
In 1998, President of the United States Bill Clinton nominated Henry to be Assistant Secretary of the Army (Manpower and Reserve Affairs) and following Senate confirmation, Henry held this office from 1998 to 2001. During this time, he also served as a Commissioner on the Presidential Advisory Commission on Holocaust Assets in the United States.

== Henry Consulting Group ==
Henry left government service in 2001 and founded the Henry Consulting Group, becoming its president. Henry Consulting Group specializes in personnel, healthcare, and marketing/advertising, and is headquartered in Burke, Virginia. In addition to his consulting work, from 2002 to 2004, he worked as a lobbyist on behalf of Defense Health Advisors, Inc. He has also worked as a Vice President of Delta Dental of California.

Government offices
Preceded by Sara E. Lister	Assistant Secretary of the Army (Manpower and Reserve Affairs); 1998 – 2001	Succeeded by Reginald J. Brown
