= Sara E. Lister =

American lawyer (born 1940)

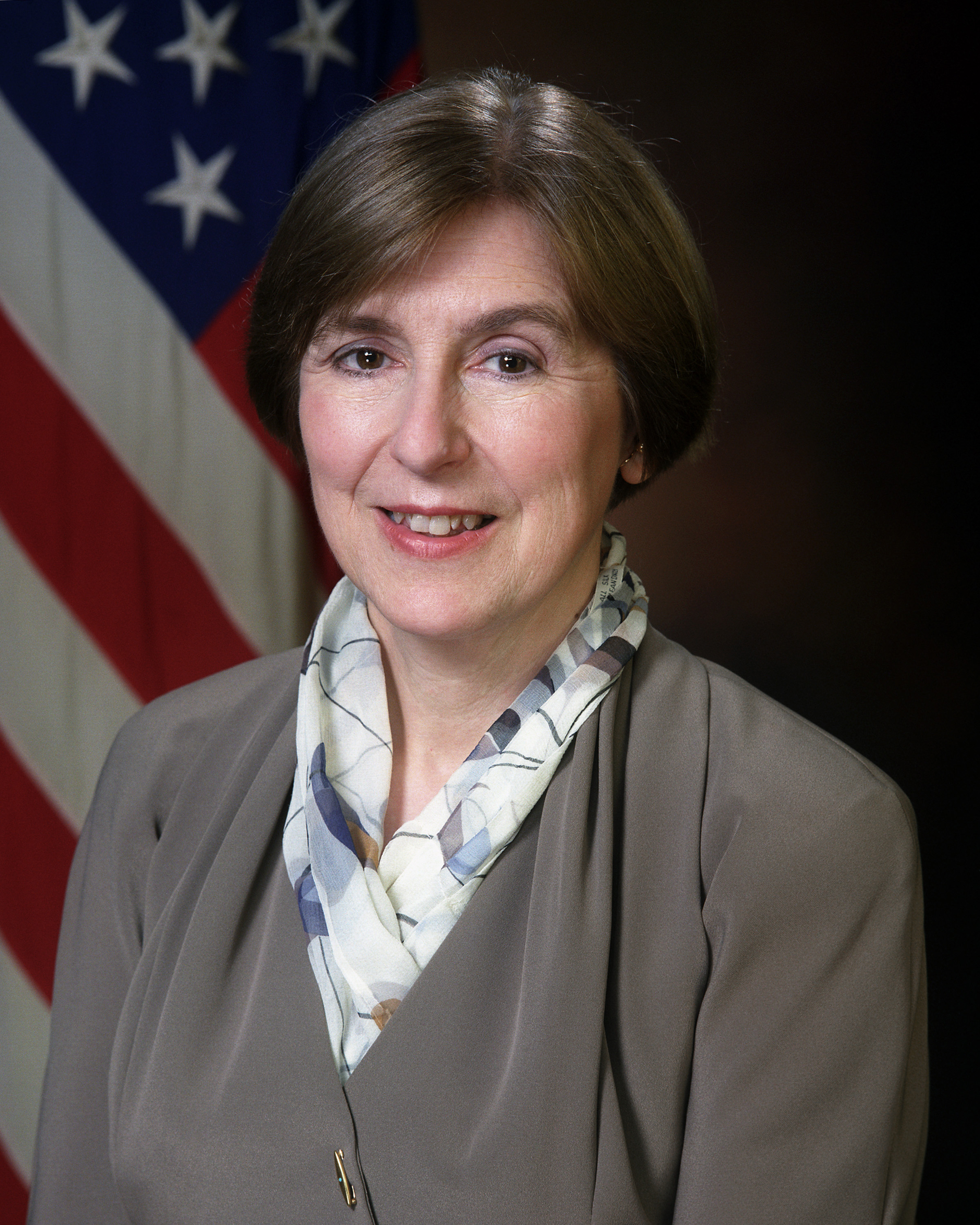

Assistant Secretary of the Army (Manpower and Reserve Affairs)
- In office June 10, 1994 – November 15, 1997
- President: Bill Clinton
- Preceded by: Robert S. Silberman
- Succeeded by: Patrick T. Henry

General Counsel of the Army
- In office 1980 – January 20, 1981
- President: Jimmy Carter
- Preceded by: Jill Wine-Banks
- Succeeded by: Delbert Spurlock

Personal details
- Born: Sara Elisabeth Ball; May 10, 1940 (age 86) Saint Paul, Minnesota, U.S.
- Relations: Joseph H. Ball (father)
- Education: Radcliffe College (BA); George Washington University (MA, JD); Yale University

Sara Elisabeth Lister (born May 10, 1940) is a United States lawyer who served as General Counsel of the Army under the Carter administration and then as Assistant Secretary of the Army (Manpower and Reserve Affairs) from 1994 to 1997, the highest ranking female civilian in the service at the time. She led efforts to provide women greater opportunities to serve in the Army, and supported investigations of sexual harassment and discrimination in the military. Lister gained national attention in November 1997 when she referred to members of the United States Marine Corps as "extremists" during a discussion at an academic conference. She was ultimately forced to resign early as Assistant Secretary of the Army because of the controversy over her remarks.

== Biography ==
Sara E. Lister was born in Saint Paul, Minnesota and raised in Washington, D.C. and New York City, studying at Sidwell Friends School and receiving her high school diploma from The Hewitt School in 1957. She was educated at Radcliffe College (A.B., 1961), George Washington University (M.A., 1966 and J.D., 1974), and Yale University (incomplete PhD studies).

During the Carter Administration, Lister served as Deputy Special Assistant to United States Secretary of Defense Harold Brown; as Deputy General Counsel of the Navy; and as General Counsel of the Army. During her time as General Counsel of the Army, Lister headed a group that studied the usefulness of the Armed Forces Qualification Test (AFQT). This group issued a report—the so-called "Lister Report"—that recommended that "the Army should eliminate use of mental categories and should revise AFQT cut scores based on a new analytical framework ... each military service should set scores at the optimum levels to achieve its own accession goals." According to one commentator, this report essentially "recommended reducing standards as necessary to meet strength goals".

With the election of Ronald Reagan in 1980, Lister left government service to practice law in the private sector.

On January 24, 1994, President Bill Clinton nominated Lister to be Assistant Secretary of the Army (Manpower and Reserve Affairs). While serving in this position, Lister was instrumental in the development of policies that opened more Army jobs to women in 1994, and played a key role in the investigations of sexual misconduct and discrimination in the service. Of Lister, retired Brig. Gen. Evelyn "Pat" Foote said, "I think she is one of the greatest soldiers the Army has ever had."

On October 26, 1997, Lister participated in a seminar in Baltimore addressing the relationship between civilian and military segments of society. During that seminar, Lister made the following comments during a discussion of scholarly papers on the topic:

I think the Army is much more connected to society than the Marines. The Marines are extremists. Whenever you have extremists, you have some risks of total disconnection with society. And that's a little dangerous.

One critic of Lister who attended the conference argued that "Lister and I have agreed on almost nothing concerning service policies… But, this was an academic exchange, a professorial context." Nevertheless, leaders of the U.S. Marine Corps did not take kindly to being labeled "extremists" and spoke out against Lister. On November 13, 1997, the United States House of Representatives passed a concurrent resolution condemning Lister's remarks, stating that her characterization of the Marine Corps as "extremists" "denigrates 222 years of sacrifice and dedication to the Nation by the Marine Corps and dishonors the hundreds of thousands of Marines whose blood has been shed in the name of freedom"; and calling for Lister's resignation. Newt Gingrich, the Speaker of the United States House of Representatives sent a letter to President Clinton in which he called Lister's remarks "completely out of order" and insulting to all military personnel. Gingrich wrote: "Nothing less than her dismissal and a full apology on your part to America's sons and daughters in uniform will suffice to repair this breach." Lister issued a formal apology for her remarks on November 14, 1997, and Defense Secretary William Cohen accepted her apology. Lister resigned her office one week earlier than planned, on November 15, 1997. One commentator argued Lister was "brought down by a carefully orchestrated campaign of conservative activists" because of "her persistent effort to get women into military units, like engineers and artillery, that are close to frontline combat." Others speculated that she was an "obvious choice" to succeed Togo West as Secretary of the Army, a concern for opponents of greater military service opportunities for women.

== Personal ==
Lister is the daughter of Republican U.S. Senator Joseph H. Ball and Elisabeth Josephine (Robbins) Ball. She had a brother and a sister.

She married U.S. Air Force officer Charles Ellis Lister on June 23, 1961 in New York City. They have two daughters.

Government offices
Preceded by Jill Wine-Banks	General Counsel of the Army; 1980	Succeeded by Delbert Spurlock
Preceded by Robert S. Silberman	Assistant Secretary of the Army (Manpower and Reserve Affairs); 1994 – November 15, 1997	Succeeded by Patrick T. Henry
