= Stefanie Tompkins =

American geologist

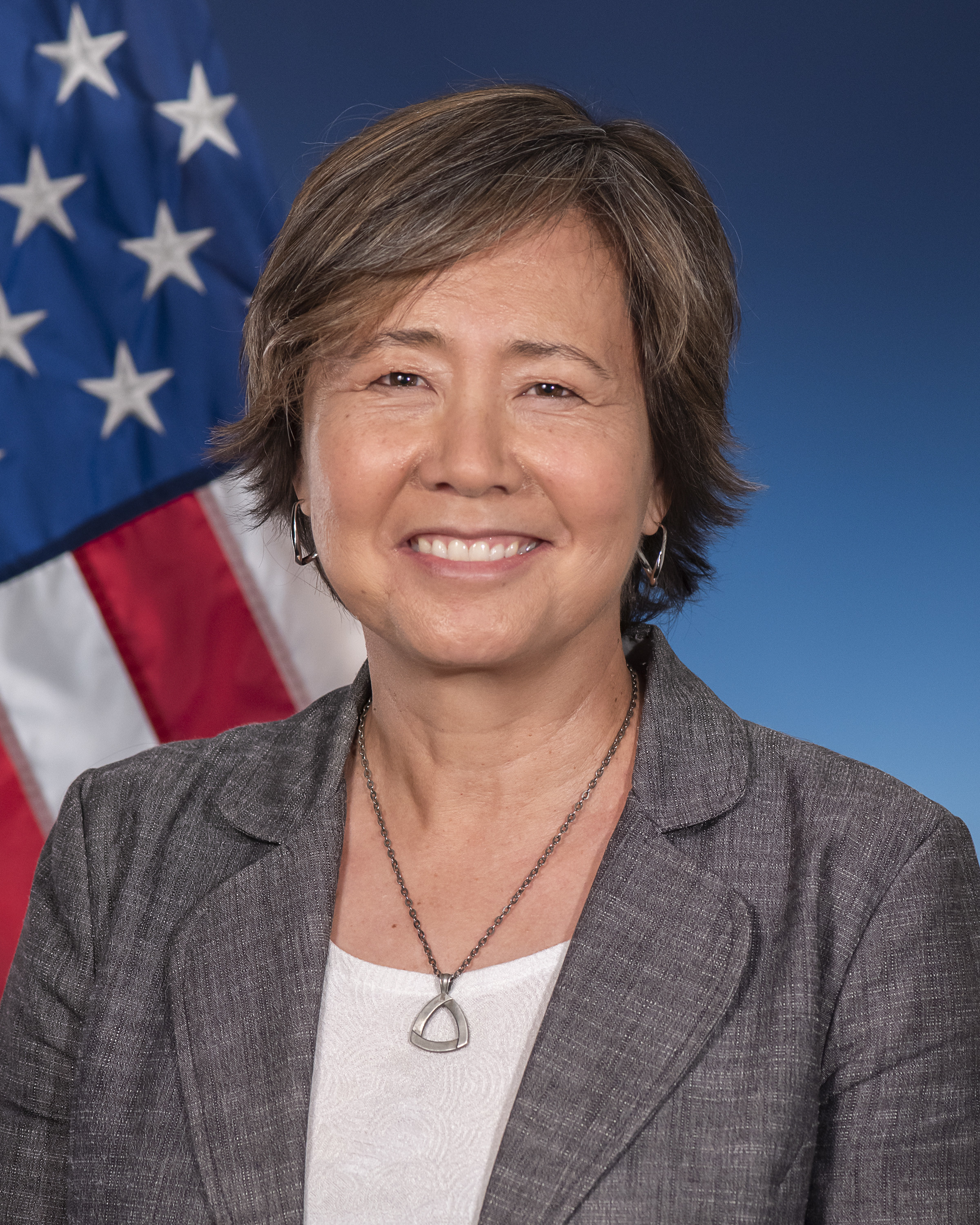
- Tompkins in 2021

23rd Director of the Defense Advanced Research Projects Agency
- In office March 15, 2021 – January 20, 2025
- President: Joe Biden
- Preceded by: Victoria Coleman

Personal details
- Born: January 21, 1967 (age 59) South Korea
- Education: Princeton University (BA); Brown University (MA, PhD)
- Scientific career
- Fields: Lunar geology
- Institutions: Science Applications International Corporation; DARPA
- Thesis: Central peaks of impact craters as probes of lunar crustal composition: Results from laboratory and remote spectral data (1997)
- Doctoral advisor: Carle M. Pieters

Stefanie Tompkins is an American geologist. She was the director of the Defense Advanced Research Projects Agency (DARPA) from 2021 to 2025. In February 2025, the Colorado School of Mines announced that she would be its next Provost, starting May 12, 2025.

== Biography ==
Tompkins was born on January 21, 1967, on a U.S. Army base in South Korea, where her father, a career US Army officer, was serving. Her mother is a linguist. The family spent time in Japan and Taiwan before moving to Hawaii. She attended the ʻIolani high school in Honolulu, graduating in 1983.

Tompkins graduated from Princeton University in 1987 with a degree in geology and geophysics. She then served as an Army Intelligence officer from 1987 to 1991. She returned to the study of geology this time at Brown University from 1993 to 1997 where she was awarded a master's degree and a doctorate while working under the guidance of Carle M. Pieters.

While she was studying at Brown, Tompkins also worked as an associate scientist at SETS Technology in Mililani in Hawaii from 1993 until in 1996, she became a Senior Staff Scientist at SAIC, where she studied the geology of Moon rocks, with funding from NASA.

In 2007 Tompkins joined DARPA's Strategic Technology Office as a program manager. In the next decade, according to DARPA, she held many roles at the agency, including a stint as director of the Defense Sciences Office. In 2017 she took up the temporary position of acting deputy director of DARPA.

In February 2018, she left DARPA to become vice president for research and technology transfer at Colorado School of Mines, spending three years there. Regarding her decision to leave DARPA for Mines, Tompkins told an interviewer:

I spent my career in a combination of national service and science and technology development. I was in the military. I have worked for the federal government. I have worked in industry doing science and technology. When you're in the intersection of these spaces, you start to develop an idea of what is important to you and what is needed to solve hard problems.

According to Tompkins, her time at Mines was a valuable preparation for understanding "critical mineral supply chains" and the role of academia "in the national security ecosystem".

== DARPA leadership ==
In 2016, Tompkins described to Michigan State University faculty DARPA's mission: "to make pivotal investments in breakthrough technologies for national security" in order to prevent, or to create, "strategic surprise".

Tompkins was on the list of President Biden's first political appointees to Pentagon positions, released January 19, 2021. Air Force Magazine noted that this would be the "third recent shuffle" of DARPA leadership. Former director Victoria Coleman resigned the directorship the day after, having served for only four months in the position. The position of DARPA director does not require Senate confirmation.

On March 15, 2021, Tompkins became DARPA's 23rd director.
