= Reginald J. Brown =

American government official (1940–2005)

Reginald J Brown
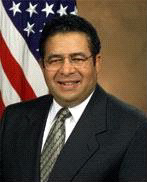

Assistant Secretary of the Army (Manpower and Reserve Affairs)
- In office August 3, 2001 – January 20, 2005
- President: George W. Bush
- Preceded by: Patrick T. Henry
- Succeeded by: Ronald J. James

Personal details
- Born: Reginald Jude Brown; February 13, 1940 New Orleans, Louisiana
- Died: December 17, 2005 (aged 65) Solomons, Maryland
- Profession: Civil Servant

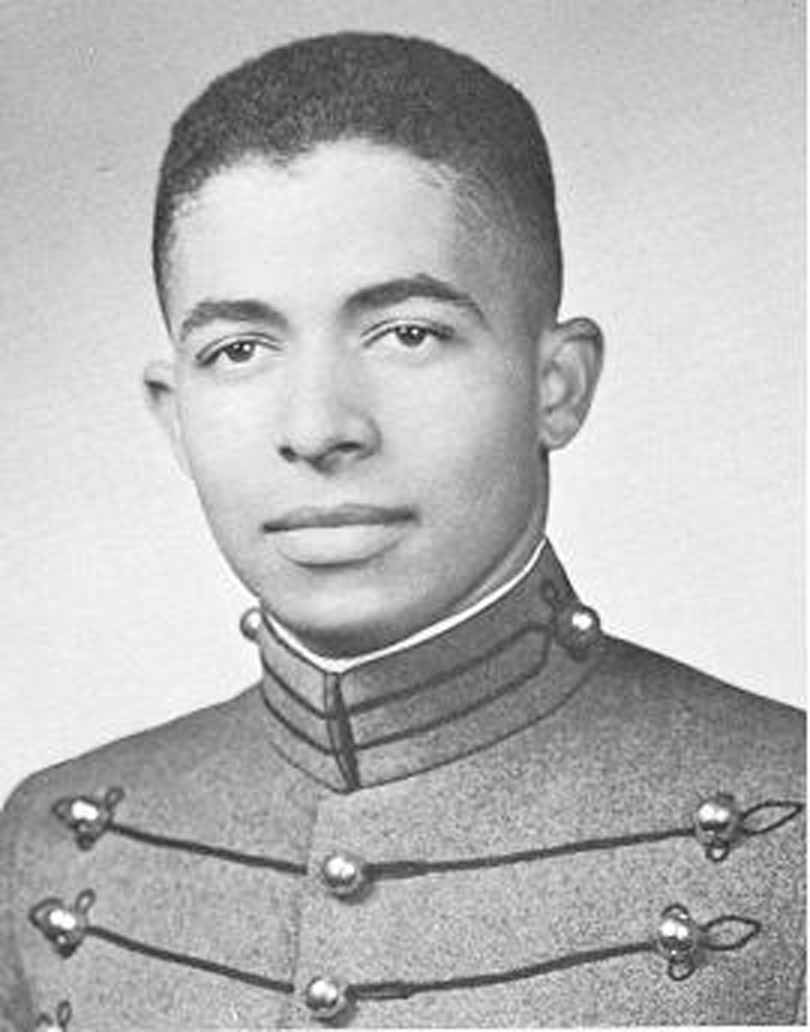
Reginald J. Brown as a young man.

Reginald Jude "Reggie" Brown (1940–2005) was United States Assistant Secretary of the Army (Manpower and Reserve Affairs) from 2001 to 2005.

== Biography ==
Brown was born on February 13, 1940, in New Orleans and raised in California, graduating from El Cerrito High School in June 1957. He attended the United States Military Academy, graduating with a B.S. in 1961. Brown joined the United States Army in 1961 and served in the Army until 1971. During this time, he earned an M.P.A. from Harvard University, awarded in 1965. Brown saw duty during the Vietnam War and was awarded the Bronze Star Medal and the Meritorious Service Medal. By the time he left the Army in 1971, he had achieved the rank of major.

Brown spent 1973–74 as deputy administrator in the Office of Food on the Cost of Living Council. Between 1974 and 1979, he held a number of different positions in the federal government, including as associate director for economic analysis at the Defense Manpower Commission; as principal analyst in the Congressional Budget Office; as executive director of the President's Commission on Military Compensation; and as director of energy, chemicals, and public utilities in the Office of Price Monitoring, Council on Wage and Price Stability.

Brown left public service in 1979, joining DECA Group, Inc. as an executive vice president in Miami. He worked there until 1982 when he became a senior fellow at the Center for Strategic and International Studies in Washington, D.C., a position he held until 1989.

Brown returned to public service in 1989 when President of the United States George H. W. Bush nominated him as an assistant administrator of the United States Agency for International Development, with responsibility for the Bureau for Program and Policy Coordination.

In 2001, President George W. Bush named Brown Assistant Secretary of the Army (Manpower and Reserve Affairs). Brown held this office from August 2001 until January 2005.

After a battle with pancreatic cancer, Brown died in Solomons, Maryland, on December 17, 2005. He is buried in the West Point Cemetery.

Government offices
Preceded by Patrick T. Henry	Assistant Secretary of the Army (Manpower and Reserve Affairs); August 2001 – January 2005	Succeeded by Ronald J. James
