= Carle M. Pieters =

American planetary scientist

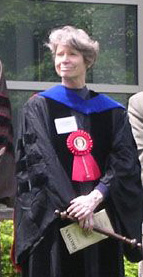
- Education: B.A. (1966) in Math Education; B.S. (1971), M.S. (1972), and Ph.D. (1977) in Planetary Science
- Alma mater: Antioch College, Massachusetts Institute of Technology
- Scientific career
- Fields: Planetary science
- Workplaces: Johnson Space Center; Brown University
- Thesis: Characterization and distribution of lunar mare basalt types using remote sensing techniques (1977)
- Doctoral advisor: Thomas B. McCord
- Doctoral students: John F. Mustard; Stefanie Tompkins

Carle McGetchin Pieters (born 1943) is an American planetary scientist. Pieters has published more than 150 research articles in peer-reviewed journals and was co-author of the book Remote Geochemical Analyses: Elemental and Mineralogical Composition along with Peter Englert. Her general research efforts include planetary exploration and evolution of planetary surfaces with an emphasis on remote compositional analyses.

== Career ==
Pieters earned her B.A. from Antioch College in 1966 in math education. After teaching high school math for one year in Massachusetts, she spent two years teaching science as a Peace Corps Volunteer in Malaysia. Upon her return to the US, she received her B.S. (1971), M.S. (1972) and Ph.D. (1977) from the Massachusetts Institute of Technology in Planetary Science. Pieters spent three years at NASA Johnson Space Center before becoming a professor at Brown University in 1980 and has remained there ever since. She is the Principal Investigator for the Moon Mineralogy Mapper, an imaging spectrometer (0.4-3.0 μm) designed to characterize and map the mineralogy of the Moon at high resolution, an instrument that was sent to the Moon on the Indian Chandraayan-1 spacecraft. She is also a co-investigator on NASA's Dawn mission to the asteroids Vesta and Ceres. Additionally, she is a sitting member of the NASA Advisory Council's Planetary Protection Subcommittee and a Fellow of both the American Association for the Advancement of Science and the American Geophysical Union.

== Awards and honors ==
- Asteroid 3713 Pieters
- Awarded the 2015 Shoemaker Distinguished Scientist Medal for lifetime dedication and impact to the planetary science research community, awarded by NASA's Solar System Exploration Research Virtual Institute (SSERVI)
- Awarded the 2010 GK Gilbert Award, the highest award given by the Geological Society of America's Division for Planetary Sciences
- Awarded the Kuiper Prize in 2004, the most distinguished award given by the American Astronomical Society's Division for Planetary Sciences
- Elected Fellow of the American Association for the Advancement of Science in 2007
- Elected Fellow of the American Geophysical Union in 2001
- Elected a Legacy Fellow of the American Astronomical Society in 2020.
