= Donald L. Putt =

United States Air Force general (1905–1988)

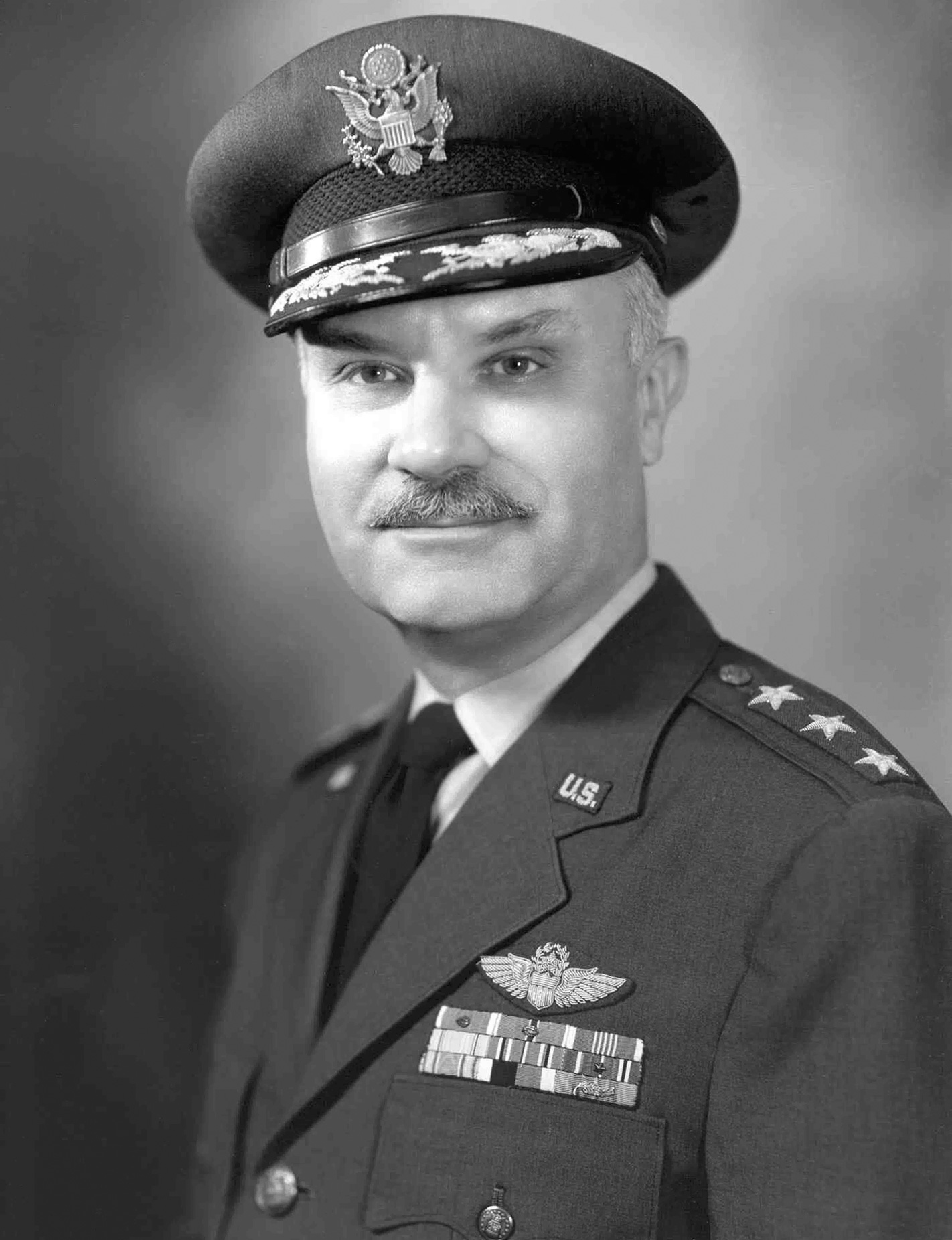
- Putt as a lieutenant general
- Born: Donald Leander Putt; May 14, 1905; Sugarcreek, Ohio, U.S.
- Died: November 24, 1988 (aged 83) Menlo Park, California, U.S.
- Buried: Arlington National Cemetery
- Allegiance: United States
- Branch: United States Army Air Corps; United States Army Air Forces; United States Air Force
- Service years: 1928–1958
- Rank: Lieutenant general
- Commands: Air Research and Development Command
- Awards: Legion of Merit with oak leaf cluster Bronze Star Medal with oak leaf cluster Croix de Guerre with palm

Donald Leander Putt (May 14, 1905 – November 24, 1988) was a United States Air Force lieutenant general and aeronautical engineer. He commanded the Air Research and Development Command and later served as deputy chief of staff for development and military director of the Air Force Scientific Advisory Board.

== Early life and education ==
Putt was born May 14, 1905, in Sugarcreek, Ohio. He graduated in 1928 from the Carnegie Institute of Technology with a B.S. in electrical engineering. He received an M.S. in aeronautical engineering from the California Institute of Technology in 1938.

== Military career ==
Putt was commissioned in the Signal Corps Reserve in May 1928 and was appointed a flying cadet the next month. He was commissioned in the Air Reserve on June 28, 1929, and received a Regular commission three months later. He was assigned to Selfridge Field and later completed the Armament course at Chanute Field. He served as a test pilot at Wright Field from February 1933 to August 1936; during this time, he was the co-pilot for the first military test flight of the B-17, known as "Model 299". The plane stalled and crashed, killing the pilot Ployer Peter Hill and Boeing's chief test pilot Leslie Tower, although Putt survived with severe injuries. Putt subsequently served in engineering posts at Wright Field, including chief of the Experimental Bombardment Aircraft Branch during development of the B-24, B-29, B-36, and other aircraft.

He served with U.S. Air Forces in Europe as chief of Technical Services from October 1944 to August 1945. He helped recover German aeronautical research, equipment, documents, and scientists, leading Operation Paperclip, a secret operation to bring German scientific experts to the US after World War II.

Putt became vice commander of Air Research and Development Command in January 1952 and assumed command on June 30, 1953. In April 1954, he became deputy chief of staff for Development and military director of the Air Force Scientific Advisory Board.

Putt retired in 1958 after disagreement with Defense Secretary Neil H. McElroy over public comments on space policy, succeeded by Roscoe C. Wilson.

== Later career ==
In 1959, after retirement from the military, Putt joined United Aircraft and founded what became the Chemical Systems division in Sunnyvale, California. The division manufactured solid-fuel rockets for space flights. He retired from United Aircraft in 1970.

In 1961, The New York Times reported concern over Putt's dual role as president of United Technology Corporation and chair of the Air Force Scientific Advisory Board after United Technology received an Air Force solid-rocket development contract; Putt denied a conflict of interest, and the Air Force said the board's role was advisory and did not determine the contractor selection.

== Honors ==
- Decorations: Legion of Merit with oak leaf cluster; Bronze Star with oak leaf cluster; French Croix de Guerre with palm.
- Rated as a command pilot and technical observer.
- Received an honorary doctor of engineering degree from Brooklyn Polytechnic Institute on June 15, 1954.

== Personal life and death ==
Putt was married to Margaret Putt, who predeceased him; they had one son, William D. Putt.

Putt died November 24, 1988, in Menlo Park, California, at age 83, and he was buried at Arlington National Cemetery beside his wife.
