= Assistant Secretary of the Army (Manpower and Reserve Affairs) =

Civilian official in the U.S. Department of the Army

United States Assistant Secretary of the Army (Manpower and Reserve Affairs)
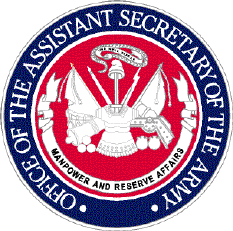
- Seal of the Office of the Assistant Secretary of the Army (Manpower and Reserve Affairs)

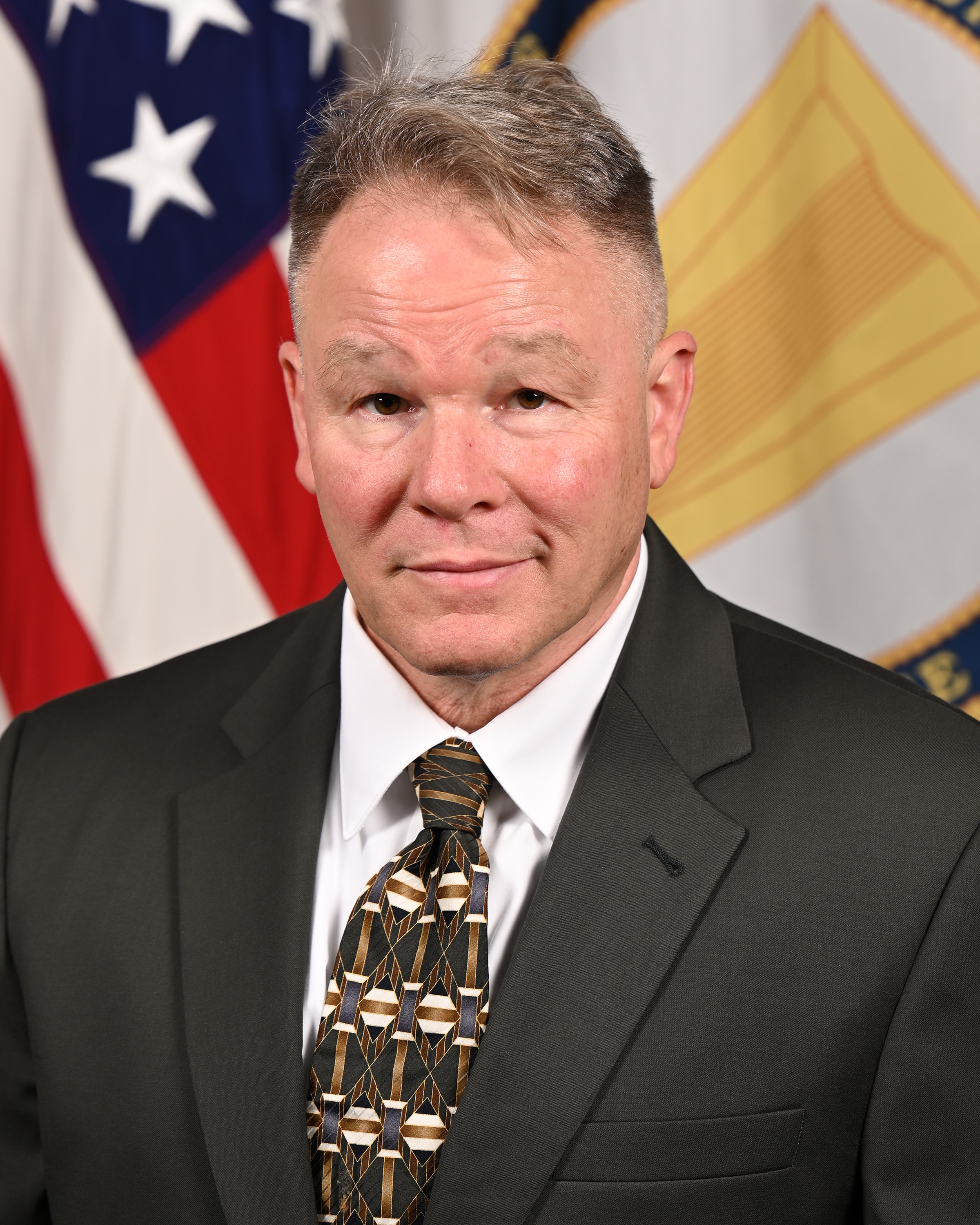
- Incumbent; Daniel S. Zevitz; Acting since October 31, 2026
- Style: Mr. Secretary; The Honorable (formal address in writing)
- Reports to: Secretary of the Army; Under Secretary of the Army
- Seat: The Pentagon, Arlington County, Virginia, United States
- Nominator: The president with Senate advice and consent
- Term length: No fixed term
- Constituting instrument: 10. U.S.C. § 7016
- Formation: 1968
- First holder: William K. Brehm
- Succession: 18th in SecDef succession by seniority of appointment
- Salary: Executive Schedule, Level IV
- Website: Official website

The assistant secretary of the army (manpower and reserve affairs), abbreviated as ASA (M&RA), is a civilian official in the United States Department of the Army.

U.S. law provides that there shall be five assistant secretaries of the Army appointed from civilian life by the president, by and with the advice and consent of the Senate. The assistant secretary of the Army for manpower and reserve affairs has as his principal duty the overall supervision of manpower and reserve component affairs of the Department of the Army. Pursuant to United States Army General Order No. 3, the assistant secretary of the Army (manpower and reserve affairs) supervises army strategy, policy, programs, and compliance related to functions such as recruiting, readiness and mobilization, civilian and military manpower, medical and health affairs, family and Morale, Welfare and Recreation, the review of soldier records, force structure policy, manpower analysis, the army-wide equal employment opportunity program and critical matters pertaining to reserve affairs.

The office can be traced to 1950, when United States secretary of the Army Gordon Gray decided to centralize manpower issues for civil, military, and reserve personnel under one individual, with the position being elevated to Assistant Secretary when manpower issues proved to be a problem during the course of the Korean War. The office was then abolished in 1961, with its duties transferred to the Office of the Under Secretary of the Army, but then re-established - this time by statute - in 1968.

== List of assistant secretaries ==
Picture	Name	Assumed office	Left office	President appointed by	Secretary served under
	William K. Brehm	1968	1969	Lyndon B. Johnson	Stanley Rogers Resor
	Donald G. Brotzman	1975	1977	Gerald R. Ford	Martin R. Hoffman
	Robert Nelson (acting)	January 20, 1981	June 1981	Ronald Reagan	John Otho Marsh, Jr.
	Harry N. Walters	June 1981	January 5, 1983	Ronald Reagan	John Otho Marsh, Jr.
	Delbert Spurlock	1983	1989	Ronald Reagan	John Otho Marsh, Jr.
	G. Kim Wincup	1989	May 1992	George H. W. Bush	Michael P. W. Stone
	Robert S. Silberman	1992	January 20, 1993	George H. W. Bush	Michael P. W. Stone
	Sara E. Lister	June 10, 1994	November 15, 1997	Bill Clinton	Togo D. West, Jr.
	Patrick T. Henry	June 10, 1998	January 20, 2001	Bill Clinton	Louis Caldera
	Reginald J. Brown	August 3, 2001	January 20, 2005	George W. Bush	Thomas E. White, Francis J. Harvey
	Ronald J. James	October 1, 2006	January 20, 2009	George W. Bush	Francis J. Harvey, Pete Geren
	Thomas R. Lamont	June 22, 2009	September 30, 2013	Barack Obama	Pete Geren, John M. McHugh
	Debra S. Wada	October 2, 2014	January 20, 2017	Barack Obama	John M. McHugh, Eric Fanning
	Casey Wardynski	January 16, 2019	January 20, 2021	Donald Trump	Mark Esper; Ryan D. McCarthy
	Yvette K. Bourcicot (acting)	January 10, 2022	December 22, 2022	Joe Biden	Christine Wormuth
	Agnes Gereben Schaefer	December 23, 2022	January 20, 2025	Joe Biden	Christine Wormuth
	Mark R. Lewis (acting)	January 20, 2025	February 25, 2025	Donald Trump	Mark Averill (acting)
	Julie A. Banks (acting)	February 25, 2025	April 9, 2025	Donald Trump	Daniel P. Driscoll
	Derrick Anderson (acting)	April 9, 2025	December 29, 2025	Donald Trump	Daniel P. Driscoll
	Christopher M. Sims (acting)	January 8, 2026	May 20, 2026	Donald Trump	Daniel P. Driscoll
	Jules W. Hurst III	May 20, 2026	August 12, 2026	Donald Trump	Daniel P. Driscoll
	James Byrn (acting)	August 12, 2026	October 31, 2026	Donald Trump	Daniel P. Driscoll; Adam Telle (acting)
	Daniel S. Zevitz (acting)	October 31, 2026	Present	Donald Trump	Adam Telle (acting)
