= G. Kim Wincup =

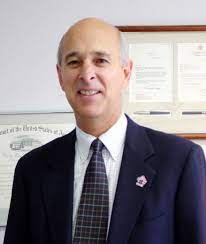

Principal Deputy Undersecretary of the Air Force for Acquisition
- In office May 1992 – December 1992
- President: George H. W. Bush
- Preceded by: John J. Welch Jr.
- Succeeded by: Darleen A. Druyun (Acting)

Assistant Secretary of the Army (Manpower and Reserve Affairs)
- In office 1989–1992
- Preceded by: Delbert Spurlock
- Succeeded by: Robert S. Silberman

Personal details
- Born: Gary Kim Wincup

Gary Kim Wincup (born September 6, 1944) was United States Assistant Secretary of the Army (Manpower and Reserve Affairs) from 1989 to 1992 and Assistant Secretary of the Air Force (Acquisition) in 1992.

== Biography ==
Wincup was born in St. Louis, Missouri and graduated from Kirkwood High School in June 1962. He continued his education at DePauw University, receiving a B.A. in Political Science in June 1966. Wincup then attended the University of Illinois College of Law, receiving a J.D. in June 1969.

After law school, Wincup served as a judge advocate in the United States Air Force Judge Advocate General's Corps from January 1970 to December 1973. In 1974, he became counsel to the United States House Committee on Armed Services. He would serve there for fifteen years, eventually becoming the committee's staff director.

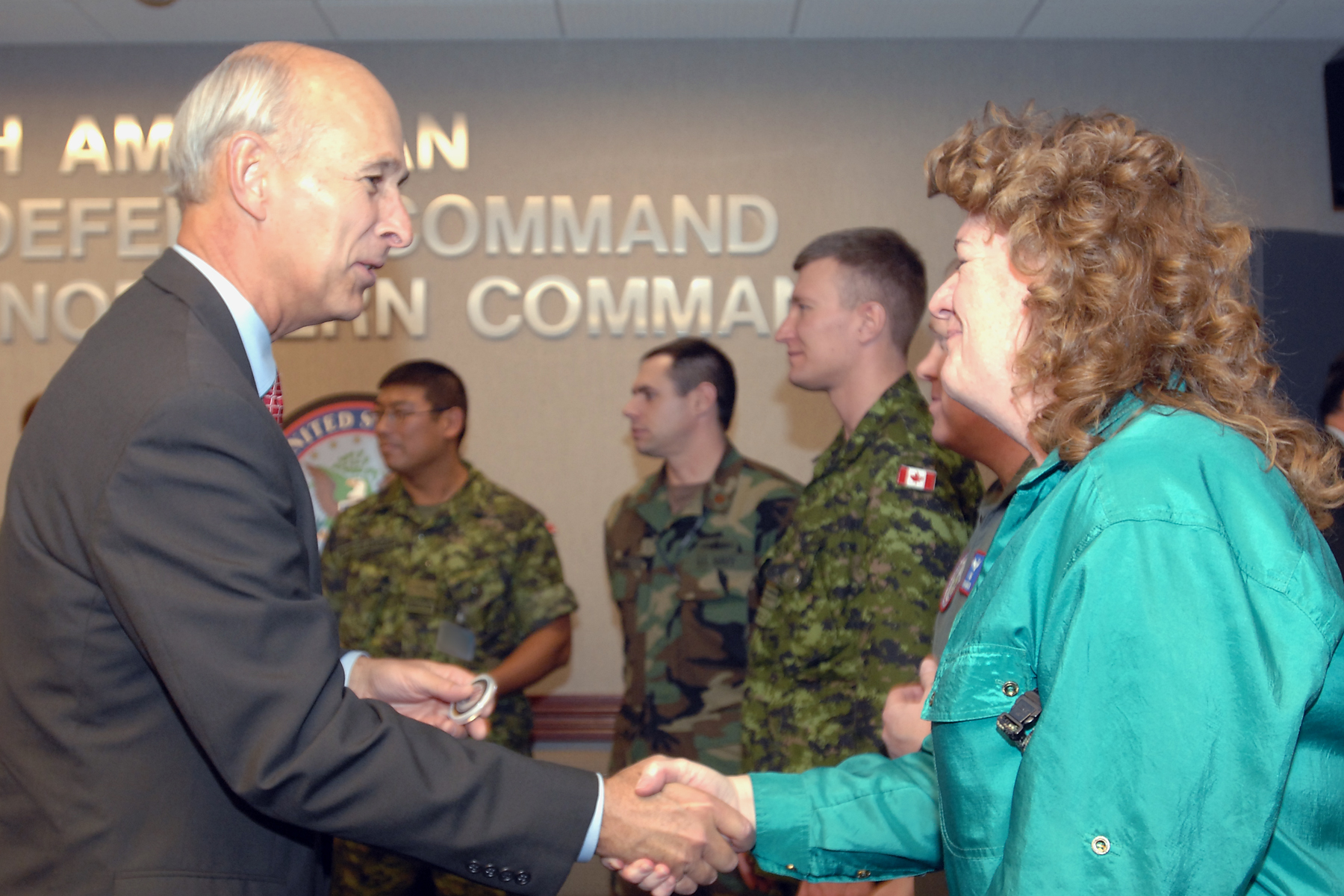
G. Kim Wincup, chairman of the Reserve Forces Policy Board, recognizes Kim Robinson of U.S. Northern Command with his coin during the Board's visit to North American Aerospace Defense Command and USNORTHCOM headquarters at Peterson Air Force Base, Colo., on April 16, 2008.

In 1989, President of the United States George H. W. Bush nominated Wincup to be Assistant Secretary of the Army (Manpower and Reserve Affairs) and, after Senate confirmation, Wincup held that office from 1989 to 1992. In 1992, he became Assistant Secretary of the Air Force (Acquisition). The next year, he became the staff director of the United States Congress Joint Committee on the Organization of Congress. He spent 1994 as a visiting professor of National Security Affairs at the Naval Postgraduate School, and as of 2021, serves as a member of the Board of Advisors.

Wincup left government service in 1994, becoming senior vice president of SAIC.

In 2006, the United States Department of Defense announced that Wincup was becoming Chairman of the department's Reserve Forces Policy Board.

He currently serves on the board of directors for Our Military Kids, a non-profit military services organization.

Wincup also sits as a non-resident Senior Advisor to the International Security program at CSIS.

Government offices
Preceded by Delbert Spurlock	Assistant Secretary of the Army (Manpower and Reserve Affairs); 1989 – 1992	Succeeded by Robert S. Silberman
Preceded by John J. Welch, Jr.	Assistant Secretary of the Air Force (Acquisition); 1992	Succeeded by Clark G. Fiester
