= Robert S. Silberman =

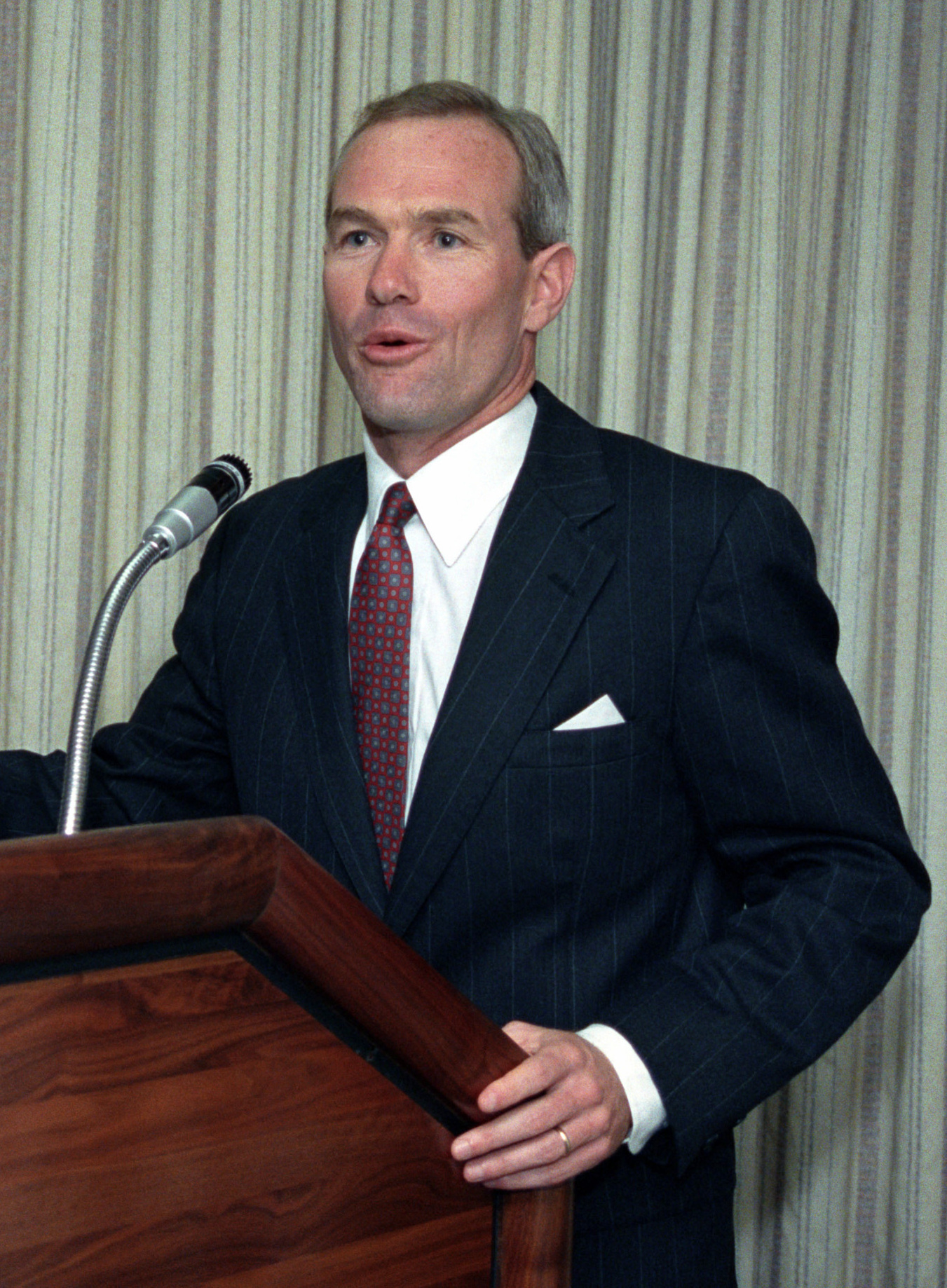
- Silberman in September 1992

United States Assistant Secretary of the Army for Manpower and Reserve Affairs
- In office 1992–1993
- President: George H. W. Bush
- Preceded by: G. Kim Wincup
- Succeeded by: Sara E. Lister

Personal details
- Born: Robert Stephen Silberman; October 30, 1957 (age 68) Boston, Massachusetts, U.S.
- Parents: Laurence Silberman; Ricky Gaull Silberman
- Education: Dartmouth College (BA); Johns Hopkins University (MA)

Military service
- Allegiance: United States
- Branch/service: United States Navy
- Years of service: 1980–1984
- Rank: Lieutenant (junior grade)

Robert Stephen Silberman is an American businessman and former United States Assistant Secretary of the Army (Manpower and Reserve Affairs) from 1992 to 1993. He was previously assistant to the chief executive officer of International Paper from 1993 to 1995 and CEO of Strayer Education, Inc. from 2001 to 2013. Silberman was named executive chairman of the board of Strayer Education Inc. (now known as Strategic Education, Inc.) in 2013. He is the son of Judge Laurence Silberman.

== Biography ==
Robert S. Silberman was born in Boston on October 30, 1957. He is a 1976 graduate of the Phillips Exeter Academy. Silberman was educated at Dartmouth College, receiving a B.A. in history in 1980. He received an M.A. in international economics from the Johns Hopkins University School of Advanced International Studies in 1990.

From 1980 to 1984, Silberman served as a United States Naval Officer aboard USS Badger (FF-1071). From 1985 to 1988, he worked in energy finance at The Henley Group, and at Ogden Corporation (the predecessor to Covanta Holding Corporation.) In 1988 he entered Federal Government service as deputy administrator of the United States Maritime Administration in the United States Department of Transportation.

In 1990, he was appointed United States Deputy Assistant Secretary of the Navy. On June 15, 1992, President of the United States George H. W. Bush nominated Silberman to be United States Assistant Secretary of the Army (Manpower and Reserve Affairs). After Senate confirmation, Silberman held this office from 1992 to 1993.

Silberman left government service in 1993, becoming assistant to the chief executive officer of International Paper. He left for CalEnergy Company in 1995, where he served in a number of senior management roles, including as president and chief operating officer. He left CalEnergy in 2000, and in March 2001 became chief executive officer of Strayer Education, Inc. Additionally, since 2003 he has served as chairman of the board of Strayer, now known as Strategic Education, Inc.

In 2007, during his tenure at Strayer Education, Silberman was awarded Morningstar's CEO of the Year award. Other recipients of the award include Warren Buffett, Jamie Dimon, Charles Schwab and Herb Kelleher.

Silberman currently serves as a director of Strategic Education, Inc. and as the Chairman of the Board of Par Pacific Holdings, Inc. He also serves on the board of visitors of The Johns Hopkins University School of Advanced International Studies. He is a member of the Council on Foreign Relations as well.

Government offices
Preceded by G. Kim Wincup	Assistant Secretary of the Army (Manpower and Reserve Affairs); 1992 – 1993	Succeeded by Sara E. Lister
