= Thomas R. Lamont =

American lawyer

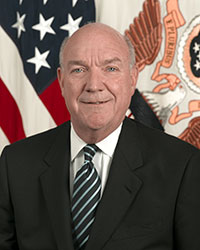

Assistant Secretary of the Army (Manpower and Reserve Affairs)
- In office June 22, 2009 – September 30, 2013
- President: Barack Obama
- Preceded by: Ronald J. James
- Succeeded by: Debra S. Wada

Personal details
- Born: March 8, 1947 (age 79) Jacksonville, Illinois
- Party: Democratic
- Education: Illinois State University (B.A.); University of Illinois (J.D.)
- Profession: Attorney

Thomas Ray Lamont (born March 8, 1947) was the United States Assistant Secretary of the Army (Manpower and Reserve Affairs), from June 22, 2009, to September 30, 2013.

== Biography ==
Thomas Lamont was born in Jacksonville, Illinois and graduated from Virginia Senior High in Virginia, Illinois in 1965. He was educated at Illinois State University, graduating with a B.S. in 1969, and at the University of Illinois College of Law, receiving a J.D. degree in 1972.

In the mid-1970s, he worked as Counsel to the Speaker of the Illinois House of Representatives. He later practiced law in Chicago at the firms of Gordon & Glickson and Altheimer & Gray, and at the Springfield, Illinois law firm of Brown, Hay & Stephens. As a lawyer, Lamont's practice focused on Government Law and Legislative Affairs.

In addition to his work as a lawyer, Lamont was involved in community and public service in a number of ways. For over 25 years, he served as a Judge Advocate General for the Illinois Army National Guard, eventually becoming Judge Advocate of the Illinois Staff, and retiring with the rank of colonel in 2007. In 1990, Lamont was elected as a trustee of the board of directors of the University of Illinois system for a six-year term. In 1996, trustees went from being elected to appointive, and he was subsequently reappointed in 1996 and 2002, ending his tenure as a trustee in 2003. He served as a member of the Illinois Board of Higher Education. He also served on the Military Academy Appointments Committee of U.S. Senator Alan J. Dixon (D—Ill.).

On April 27, 2009, President of the United States Barack Obama nominated Lamont to be Assistant Secretary of the Army. He served until September 2013. He was subsequently appointed to the American Battle Monuments Commission. He was nominated by President Obama to the National Commission on the Future of the Army and served as its vice-chairman until its conclusion (2016).

Government offices
Preceded by Ronald J. James	Assistant Secretary of the Army (Manpower and Reserve Affairs); June 22, 2009 – September 30, 2013	Succeeded by Debra S. Wada
