= Thomas P. Glynn =

American government official

Thomas P. Glynn III

Massachusetts Port Authority CEO
- In office 2012–2018
- Preceded by: Thomas J. Kinton Jr.
- Succeeded by: John Pranckevicius

United States Deputy Secretary of Labor
- In office May 24, 1993 – April 15, 1996
- President: Bill Clinton
- Preceded by: Delbert L. Spurlock, Jr.
- Succeeded by: Kathryn O. Higgins

General Manager of the Massachusetts Bay Transportation Authority
- In office 1989–1991
- Preceded by: James O'Leary
- Succeeded by: John J. Haley Jr.

Personal details
- Education: Tufts University; Brandeis University

Thomas P. Glynn III is a senior official at Harvard University overseeing the Harvard Allston Land Company, a new entity to develop commercial real estate in the Allston land owned by Harvard. He is the former chief executive officer of the Massachusetts Port Authority, former general manager of the Massachusetts Bay Transportation Authority (MBTA) and United States Deputy Secretary of Labor. From May 2023 to October 2024, he served as chair of the MBTA's board of directors.

== Education ==
Glynn attended Tufts University, where he majored in economics and was a campus activist. He took an active role in protests against the Vietnam War and "white racism". In 1968 he was chosen to be that year's Mr. Tufts, the highest honor for an undergraduate student. He later earned a master's degree and doctorate in social policy from Brandeis University.

== Early career ==
Glynn began his career in government as a policy analyst for Massachusetts Governor Francis W. Sargent. In 1977 he moved to Washington D.C., where he served as policy director for ACTION and later as staff director for Vice President Walter Mondale's commission on youth employment issues. He returned to Massachusetts in 1981 to become associate dean at Brandeis' Heller School of Social Welfare. He also served as an issues manager during Michael Dukakis' 1982 gubernatorial campaign. From 1983 to 1988 he was the deputy state welfare commissioner, where he helped develop the Employment and Training Choices program for mothers on public assistance. He then served as a political advisor to Dukakis during his 1988 presidential campaign and as general manager of the World Trade Center in South Boston.

== MBTA ==
In 1989, Dukakis appointed Glynn to the position of chief executive officer of the Massachusetts Bay Transportation Authority. During his tenure at the MBTA, ridership increased and small customer services, including more telephones and change machines, were installed at MBTA stations. Glynn also oversaw the Authority during the 1990 Back Bay, Massachusetts train collision, which injured 453 people, and another crash on the Green Line that same month in which an operator was found to have been under the influence of alcohol. In 1991, Glynn resigned to become senior vice president for administration and finance at Brown University.

Glynn chaired the public transportation committee of governor-elect Maura Healey's transition. On April 21, 2023, he was appointed by Healey to be the non-executive chair of the MBTA's board of directors. Glynn left the post in October, 2024, to be replaced by former Lynn mayor and fellow board member Tom McGee.

== Deputy Secretary of Labor ==
In 1993, Glynn was nominated to be United States Deputy Secretary of Labor. He was confirmed by the United States Senate by unanimous consent on May 24, 1993. He resigned on April 15, 1996. At the time of his resignation, Glynn was one of the longest serving Deputy Secretaries of Labor in modern department history.

== Private sector ==
Glynn left the Department of Labor to become chief operating officer of Partners HealthCare, the second-ranking position in Massachusetts' largest hospital network. He left in 2010 to teach at Harvard University's Kennedy School of Government and become a senior fellow at the Center for American Progress. He also served as an informal health care adviser and labor dispute mediator for Boston Mayor Thomas Menino.

== Massport ==
In 2012, Glynn was named chief executive officer of the Massachusetts Port Authority, the agency that runs Logan International Airport and the Port of Boston. In August 2018, Glynn announced that he would step down as chief executive officer, after six years.

== Harvard University ==
Glynn previously served as the chief executive officer of the Harvard Allston Land Company, overseeing Harvard University's non-institutional development of its Enterprise Research Campus in Allston. He is now an adjunct lecturer at Harvard Kennedy School (HKS) and teaches a course on making state and local government work.
