= Richard J. Joseph =

36th Chief Scientist of the United States Air Force

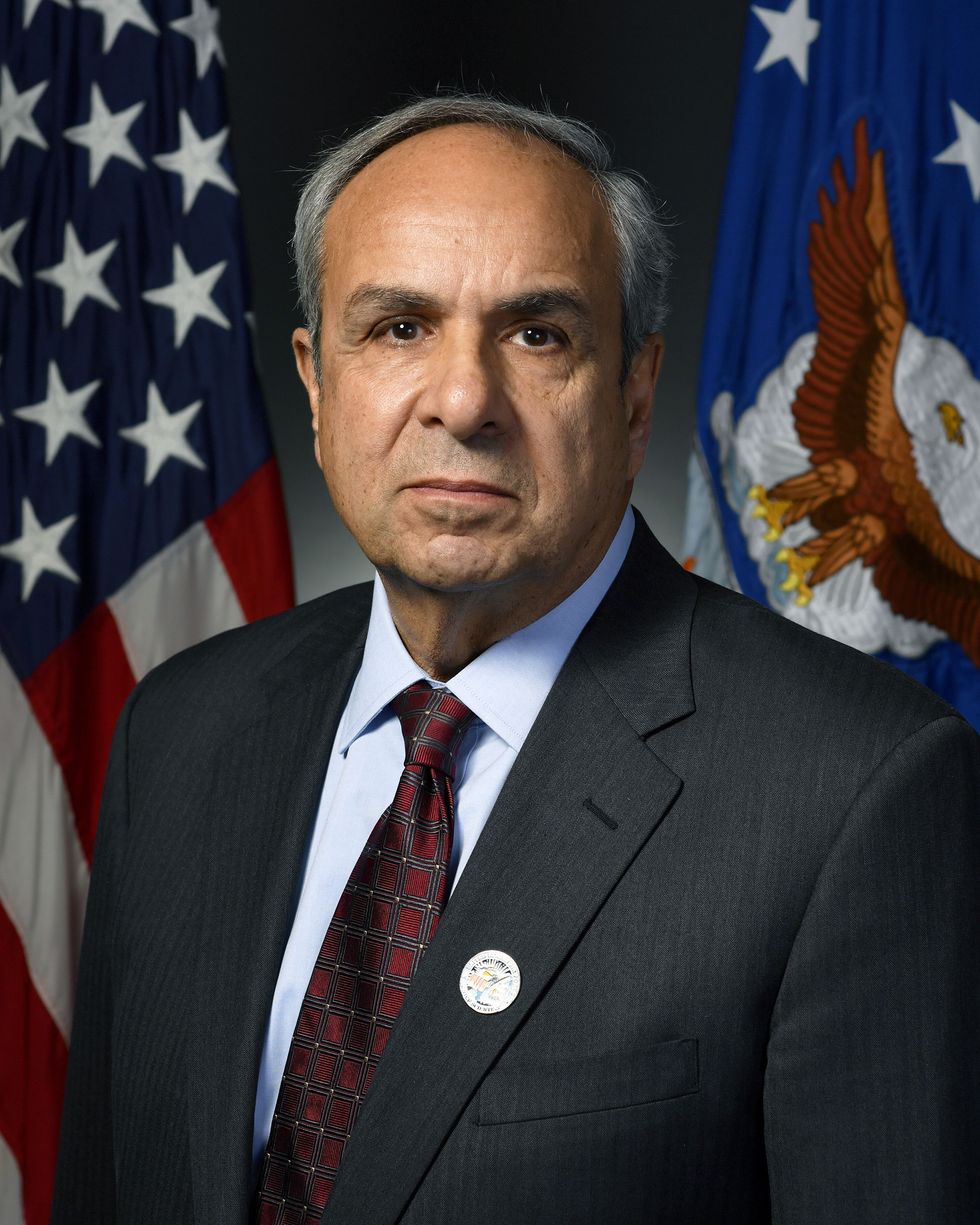
- Citizenship: American
- Education: Georgetown University (BS); University of Texas at Austin (PhD)
- Scientific career
- Institutions: U.S. Air Force Academy

Richard J. Joseph was the 36th Chief Scientist of the United States Air Force from January 2018 until April 6, 2021, when he was replaced by Victoria Coleman.

== Education ==
Richard J. Joseph has a Bachelors of Science in Physics from Georgetown University in Washington D.C, and a Ph.D in Physics, from University of Texas, Austin.
