= William K. Brehm =

Assistant U.S. Secretary of Defense (1929–2025)

- Born: March 29, 1929; Dearborn, Michigan, U.S.
- Died: July 30, 2025 (aged 96)
- Education: University of Michigan

William K. Brehm (March 29, 1929 – July 30, 2025) was an American businessman who served as Assistant Secretary of the Army (Manpower and Reserve Affairs) from 1968 to 1970, Assistant Secretary of Defense for Manpower and Reserve Affairs from 1973 to 1976, and Assistant Secretary of Defense for Legislative Affairs from 1976 to 1977.

== Life and career ==
William K. Brehm was raised in Dearborn, Michigan, where he attended Fordson High School, graduating in 1947. He then attended the University of Michigan, receiving a bachelor's degree and a master's degree in mathematics and physics. From 1952 to 1964, Brehm worked in advanced systems engineering in the aerospace engineering.

In 1964, Brehm joined the Office of the United States Secretary of Defense. In 1968, he became Assistant Secretary of the Army (Manpower and Reserve Affairs) and served in that office until December 1970.

Brehm then joined Dart Industries as Vice-President for Corporate Development.

Brehm returned to the United States Department of Defense in 1973 as Assistant Secretary of Defense for Manpower and Reserve Affairs under United States Secretary of Defense James R. Schlesinger. He held this office until 1976 when he became Assistant Secretary of Defense for Legislative Affairs under Defense Secretary Donald Rumsfeld. He served as Assistant Secretary of Defense for Legislative Affairs from March 19, 1976, to January 20, 1977.

From 1977 to 1980, Brehm was executive vice-president of the Computer Network Corporation. In 1978, Brehm helped to found SRA International. He was the chairman of the board of directors of SRA International from 1980 to 2003. At the request of David Charles Jones, Chairman of the Joint Chiefs of Staff, Brehm headed a committee to redesign the Joint Chiefs of Staff. He was then chairman of the Center for Naval Analyses from 2003 to 2009.

Brehm was also a notable philanthropist. He made a $15 million contribution to Fuller Theological Seminary to found the Brehm Center for Worship, Theology, and the Arts. He also made a $44 million contribution to the University of Michigan W.K. Kellogg Eye Center to allow it to establish the Delores S. and William K. Brehm Center for Type 1 Diabetes Research and Analysis. In June 2011, he also made a $3.2 million contribution to Eastern Michigan University College of Education to develop a new special education center for research and scholarship.

Brehm died on July 30, 2025, at the age of 96.
