= Ronald J. James =

American lawyer

Ronald J James
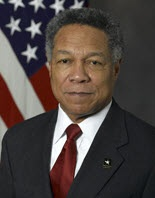

Assistant Secretary of the Army (Manpower and Reserve Affairs)
- In office October 1, 2006 – January 20, 2009
- President: George W. Bush
- Preceded by: Reginald J. Brown
- Succeeded by: Thomas R. Lamont

Personal details
- Profession: Attorney

Ronald J. James is a United States lawyer who served as Assistant Secretary of the Army (Manpower and Reserve Affairs) from 2006 to 2009.

== Biography ==
Ronald J. James was educated at the University of Missouri (B.A. in Political Science); the Southern Illinois University's Washington, D.C. extension (M.A. in Economics and Political Science); and the Washington College of Law at American University (J.D.).

James served in the United States Army as an officer in the 101st Airborne Division. He resigned in protest after Black officers were stripped of their command when the 101st was sent to quell White rioting in response to the integration of the University of Mississippi by James Meredith in 1962.

James began his career as an attorney in the United States Department of Transportation. He later became assistant general counsel of the Equal Employment Opportunity Commission. President of the United States Gerald Ford then nominated James to be administrator of the Wage and Hour Division of the United States Department of Labor, a position requiring Senate confirmation.

James then left public service, joining the law firm of Squire, Sanders & Dempsey in Cleveland. There, he represented management in labor and employment disputes.

Following the creation of the United States Department of Homeland Security in 2002, James was appointed the department's first chief human capital officer in 2003. In that capacity, he implemented a new system for hiring, pay, performance management, and labor relations, known as MaxHR, to help manage the Department's roughly 200,000 employees.

On July 21, 2006, President George W. Bush nominated James to be Assistant Secretary of the Army (Manpower and Reserve Affairs); James was confirmed by the Senate on September 29, 2006. He held this office until 2009.

Government offices
Preceded by Reginald J. Brown	Assistant Secretary of the Army (Manpower and Reserve Affairs); October 1, 2006 – January 20, 2009	Succeeded by Thomas R. Lamont
