= Victoria Coleman =

American technologist

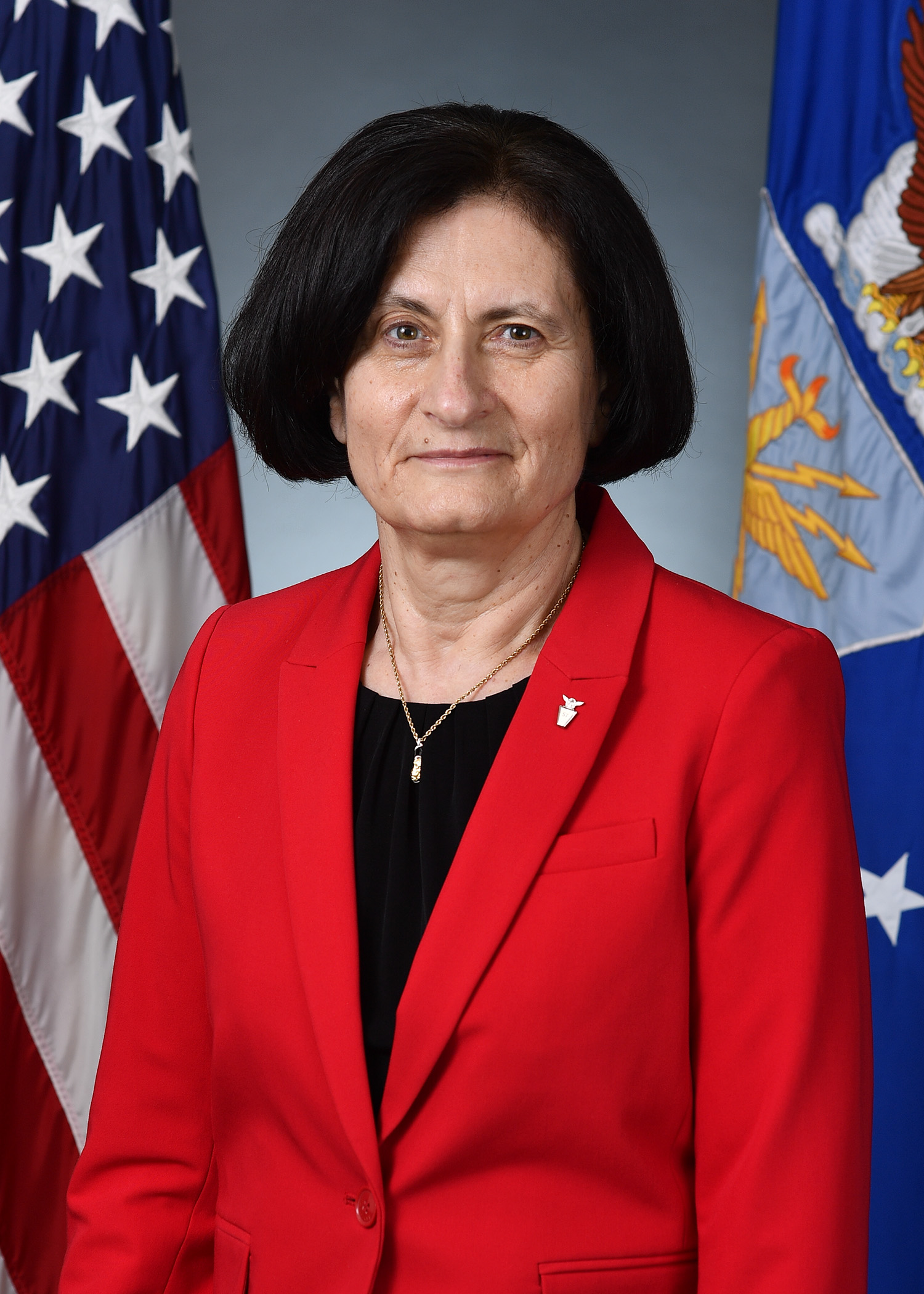
- Official portrait, 2021

37th Chief Scientist of the United States Air Force
- Incumbent
- Assumed office April 6, 2021
- President: Joe Biden
- Preceded by: Richard J. Joseph

22nd Director of the Defense Advanced Research Projects Agency
- In office September 24, 2020 – January 20, 2021
- President: Donald Trump
- Preceded by: Steven H. Walker
- Succeeded by: Stefanie Tompkins

Personal details
- Born: Greece

Victoria Stavridou-Coleman is currently serving as the 37th chief scientist of the United States Air Force. She took her oath of office on April 6, 2021, administered by the chief of staff of the United States Air Force, Gen. Charles Q. Brown Jr.

She served as the 22nd director of the Defense Advanced Research Projects Agency (DARPA); the third woman to hold such a position since the agency's inception in 1958. She was appointed on August 31, 2020, and took her oath of office on September 24, 2020, administered by the under secretary of defense for research and engineering, Michael Kratsios. Her last day at the agency was January 20, 2021.

== Career ==
She has acted as a senior advisor to the director of the Center for Information Technology Research in the Interest of Society (CITRIS) at UC Berkeley. In the past, she held the position of CEO in Atlas AI, which is a public benefit corporation bringing AI to sustainable development. Prior to Atlas AI she served as the CTO of the Wikimedia Foundation, and had the responsibility for the technology infrastructure of Wikipedia. She has also acted as a senior vice president at Technicolor where she served as CTO of its Connected Home division. Prior to Technicolor she served as Senior Vice President R&D for Harman's Infotainment division. At Yahoo! as Vice President of Engineering, she had the responsibility for membership services, presentation layer technologies, and developer relations. At Nokia as the Vice President of the Emerging Platforms she led a multi-disciplinary team with the aim of creating strategic products, which included the Nokia Z Launcher and the Nokia X line of smartphones. As the Vice President of Software Engineering at HP Palm GBU she led the webOS Platform team and built the HP TouchPad. As the vice president with Samsung's Advanced Institute of Technology in charge of the Computer Science Laboratory (San Jose, CA) she initiated the development of Tizen and the Samsung Knox line for smartphones. She was previously Intel's Director for Security Initiatives and the Director of the Trust and Manageability Laboratory in Intel's Corporate Technology Group.

She joined SRI International in 1998, after 10 years as a tenured professor in the University of London. She became the founding Director of SRI's System Design Laboratory in 1999. She is also a former Defense Science Board member, the founding Chair of DARPA's Microsystems Exploratory Council, and an adviser to companies; including Lockheed Martin and Airbus.

== Early life ==
Coleman was born in Greece. She received a B.Sc. in Electronic Computer Systems and an M.Sc. in Computer-Aided Logic Design from the University of Salford, and a Ph.D. in computer science from the University of Manchester. She holds four patents and is the author of more than 60 articles and books.
