= Chalmers W. Sherwin =

American physicist

Chalmers W. Sherwin (1916–1998) was an American physicist.

He was born at Two Harbors, Minnesota and gained a B.S. degree at Wheaton College (Illinois) and a PhD from the University of Chicago in 1940. He worked in the Radiation Laboratory of MIT from 1941 to 1945, where as part of the war effort he helped in the development of an advanced distant-warning system and airplane-mounted radar. He then worked as an assistant in the physics department at Columbia University in 1946 before becoming assistant professor of physics at the University of Illinois and professor of physics there in 1951. From 1954 to 1955 he was on secondment to the U.S. Air Force as Chief Scientist of the U.S. Air Force.

From 1961 he worked at Aerospace Corporation. As head of research at General Atomic, he oversaw the development of a carbon heart valve. He wrote two college physics texts and secured numerous patents. Around 1959 as a physicist at the University of Illinois, he had suggested a computerised learning system which would eventually become the PLATO system in 1960.

He was elected a Fellow of the American Physical Society in 1946. He died on February 20, 1998

== See also ==
- PLATO (computer system)
- Chief Scientist of the U.S. Air Force
