= James W. Mar =

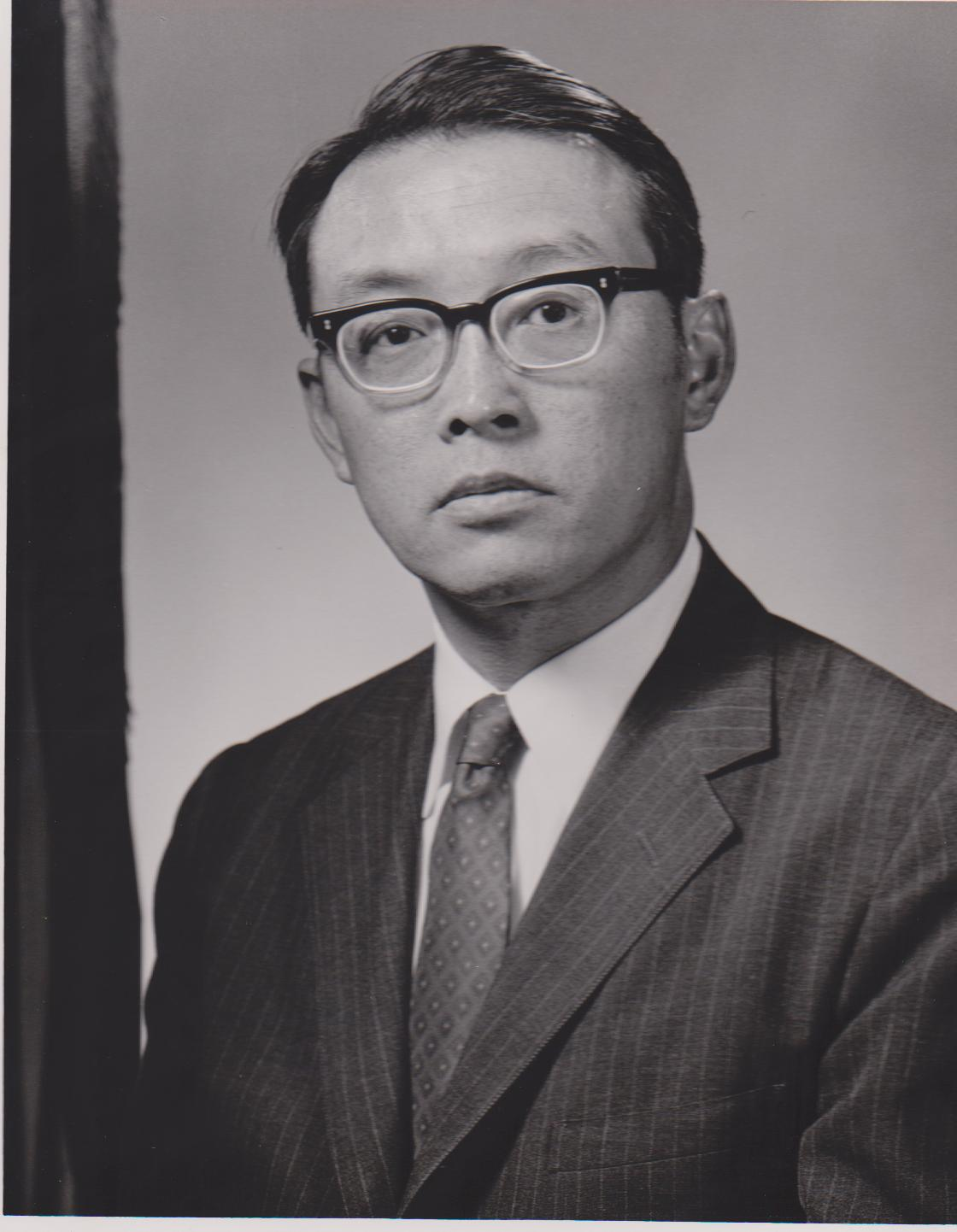

17th Chief Scientist of the United States Air Force
- In office 1970–1972
- President: Richard Nixon
- Preceded by: John J. Welch Jr.
- Succeeded by: Eugene E. Covert

Personal details
- Born: March 10, 1920 Oakland, California, U.S.
- Died: March 4, 2017 (aged 96) Seattle, Washington
- Education: Massachusetts Institute of Technology (SB, SM, PhD)
- Occupation: University professor

James Wah Mar (March 10, 1920 – March 4, 2017) was an American aeronautics and astronautics professor at the Massachusetts Institute of Technology who served as the 17th Chief Scientist of the United States Air Force. Of Chinese-American heritage, he was the first person of color to serve in this position.

== Early life ==
Mar was born on March 10, 1920, to Fook Wah Mar and Mabel Chin Mar of Oakland, California. He moved to Seattle, Washington with his family at an early age and attended Garfield High School before enrolling at the University of Washington in 1938. However, he dropped out and applied to MIT, transferring in as a sophomore. He received his Bachelor of Science from MIT in Civil Engineering in 1941 and began working for Curtiss-Wright as an aeronautical engineer. At Curtiss-Wright, he worked on the planes such as the P-40 Kittyhawk, Curtiss C-46 Commando, and the Curtiss SB2C Helldiver. From 1944 to 1946, Mar served in the United States Navy and was trained in radar maintenance; however, the war ended before he was able to see any combat. In February 1946, Mar was discharged from the Navy and he returned to MIT, where he earned a master's degree in civil engineering in 1947 and a PhD in 1949.

== Career ==
Mar joined the faculty of MIT's Aeronautics Department after completing his doctorate. His research focused on the disciplines of structures, aeroelasticity, and materials. In 1970, Mar took leave from MIT to become Chief Scientist of the United States Air Force. During his time as chief scientist, Mar was involved in helping the Air Force understand the structural problems facing aircraft such as the B-1, F-111, and C-5. After serving as chief scientist, he resumed his work at MIT, becoming the Jerome C. Hunsaker Professor of Aerospace Education and the head of the Department of Aeronautics and Astronautics from 1981 to 1983. He retired in 1990.

== Honours ==
Mar was elected to the National Academy of Engineering in 1981 for "Leadership in research and education in aerospace structures and composite materials, and for service to his country". For his work in the United States Air Force, he was twice awarded the Department of the Air Force Decoration for Exceptional Civilian Service.
