= Delbert Spurlock =

American lawyer

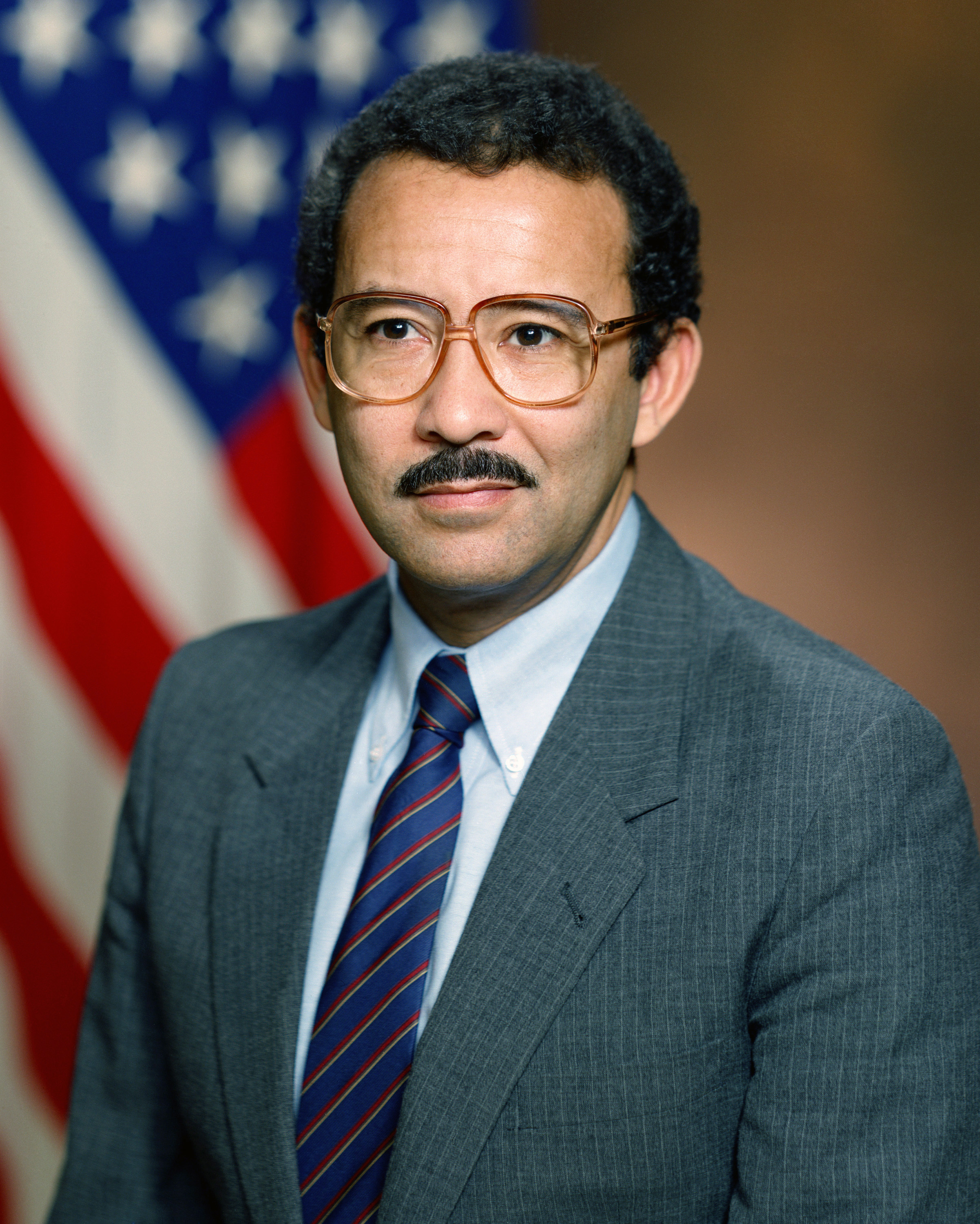
- Official portrait, 1984

27th United States Deputy Secretary of Labor
- In office 1991–1993
- President: George H. W. Bush
- Preceded by: Roderick DeArment
- Succeeded by: Thomas P. Glynn

United States Assistant Secretary of the Army for Manpower and Reserve Affairs
- In office 1983–1989
- President: Ronald Reagan
- Preceded by: Harry N. Walters
- Succeeded by: G. Kim Wincup

General Counsel of the Army
- In office 1981–1983
- President: Ronald Reagan
- Preceded by: Sara E. Lister
- Succeeded by: Susan J. Crawford

Personal details
- Born: Delbert Leon Spurlock Jr. April 3, 1941 (age 84); Richmond, Virginia, U.S.
- Spouse: Marion Ruth Ashford
- Children: 2
- Education: Oberlin College (BA); Howard University (LLB); George Washington University (LLM)
- Occupation: Lawyer; government official

Delbert Leon Spurlock Jr. (born April 3, 1941) was United States Assistant Secretary of the Army (Manpower and Reserve Affairs) from 1983 to 1989 and United States Deputy Secretary of Labor from 1991 to 1993.

He attended Hamilton College and then Oberlin College, receiving a B.A. from Oberlin in 1963. He then attended the Howard University School of Law, receiving an LL.B. in 1967, and then George Washington University Law School, receiving his LL.M. in 1972.

From 1972 to 1975, Spurlock was an acting professor of law at the UC Davis School of Law. He served as the first Chief of the Conflicts of Interest Division of the California Fair Political Practices Commission, from 1975 to 1977. He then established a law firm, Spurlock & Thatch, in Sacramento, California.

Spurlock practiced law at his own firm until 1980, when President of the United States Ronald Reagan nominated Spurlock to be General Counsel of the Army. He served as General Counsel of the Army from June 1981 until 1983, at which time President Ronald Reagan nominated him to be Assistant Secretary of the Army (Manpower and Reserve Affairs), a position he subsequently held for the remainder of the Reagan administration. From 1991 to 1993, he served as United States Deputy Secretary of Labor after being nominated by President George H. W. Bush in July 1991.

In 1993, Spurlock became Executive Vice President and Associate Publisher of the New York Daily News., a position he held until February 2010. Spurlock is the founder and former CEO of Alcel, Inc., an e-learning company.

Government offices
Preceded by Sara E. Lister	General Counsel of the Army; 1981 – 1983	Succeeded by Susan J. Crawford
Preceded by Harry N. Walters	Assistant Secretary of the Army (Manpower and Reserve Affairs); 1983 – 1989	Succeeded by G. Kim Wincup
Preceded by Roderick DeArment	United States Deputy Secretary of Labor; 1991 – 1993	Succeeded by Thomas P. Glynn
