= Werner J. A. Dahm =

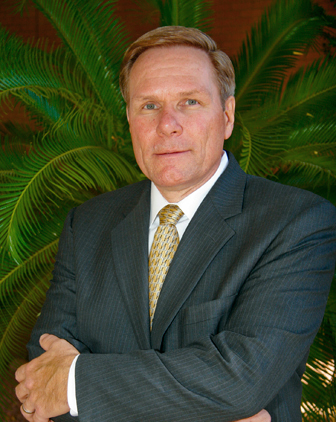
- Born: 1957 (age 67–68)
- Occupation: Aeronautical engineer

Werner J.A. Dahm (born 1957) is an ASU Foundation Professor of Aerospace and Mechanical Engineering at Arizona State University. Dahm is the director of the Security & Defense Systems Initiative at ASU.

Dahm is Emeritus Professor of Aerospace Engineering at University of Michigan. He is a member of the United States Air Force Scientific Advisory Board.

== Life ==
Dahm graduated from University of Alabama in Huntsville and the California Institute of Technology.
