= Courtland D. Perkins =

American aeronautical engineer (1912–2008)

- Born: December 27, 1912; Philadelphia, Pennsylvania, U.S.
- Died: January 6, 2008 (aged 95)
- Education: Swarthmore College; Massachusetts Institute of Technology
- Known for: Aircraft stability and control
- Notable work: Airplane Performance, Stability and Control (1949)
- Relatives: James A. Perkins (brother)
- Awards: Daniel Guggenheim Medal (2004); Legion of Honour (1977)
- Scientific career
- Fields: Aeronautical engineering
- Workplaces: Princeton University

Courtland Davis Perkins (December 27, 1912 – January 6, 2008) was an American aeronautical engineer, professor, and science administrator whose work focused on aircraft stability and control. He chaired the aeronautical engineering department at Princeton University, served as chief scientist and assistant secretary for research and development of the United States Air Force, and was president of the National Academy of Engineering from 1975 to 1983. With Robert Hage, he wrote the 1949 textbook Airplane Performance, Stability and Control.

== Early life and education ==
Perkins was born in Philadelphia on December 27, 1912. He graduated from Germantown Friends School in 1931 and from Swarthmore College with honors in mechanical engineering in 1935. Unable to find work in aeronautics during the Great Depression, he joined the American Radiator and Sanitary Corporation, becoming its Philadelphia branch engineer.

He joined the aeronautical engineering graduate program at the Massachusetts Institute of Technology in 1939 and earned a master's degree in 1941.

== Engineering and academic career ==
After earning his master's degree, Perkins joined the Aircraft Laboratory at Wright Field, where he worked in the Stability and Control Unit of the Aerodynamics Branch. He became chief of the unit during World War II. Perkins helped to develop the first test-pilot school for the Army Air Forces, and improved communication with the National Advisory Committee for Aeronautics and the aircraft industry.

In 1945, Perkins joined Princeton University as an associate professor; he was promoted to full professor within a year. In 1949, Perkins and a former colleague from his time at Wright Field, Robert Hage, published Airplane Performance, Stability and Control, a textbook that provided the engineering basis for evaluating aircraft performance, handling, and stability. He became chair of the Department of Aeronautical Engineering in 1951 and he led the department until 1974. The department built facilities during his time as chair, including wind tunnels, propulsion laboratories, and a flight-research facility.

== Government and professional service ==
Perkins was an original member of the United States Air Force Scientific Advisory Board, which was established in 1946; he went on to chair the board twice (1969 to 1973, and 1978 to 1979). He also served as chief scientist of the Air Force, from 1956 to 1957. He was assistant secretary of the Air Force for research and development from 1960 to 1961.

He helped Theodore von Kármán establish NATO's Advisory Group for Aerospace Research and Development and chaired the group from 1963 to 1967. Perkins also served as the second president of the American Institute of Aeronautics and Astronautics. He was a member of the National Academy of Sciences' Space Science Board, the Defense Science Board, and NASA's Space Program Advisory Committee. From 1986 to 1989, he served on a senior review panel of the Central Intelligence Agency.

== National Academy of Engineering ==
Perkins was elected to the National Academy of Engineering in 1969 for "leadership in the fields of airplane stability and control and airplane dynamics". He served as president of the academy from 1975 to 1983. During his two terms, the academy elected its first foreign associates and approximately doubled its membership. He was also vice chair of the National Research Council and chair of its Assembly of Engineering.

== Honors and awards ==
- First NATO von Kármán Medal
- Legion of Honour (1977)
- Honorary doctorates in engineering from Rensselaer Polytechnic Institute, Lehigh University, and Swarthmore College
- Honorary doctorate from Princeton University (2001), the first awarded by the university to a member of its engineering faculty
- Daniel Guggenheim Medal (2004), for contributions to aeronautical research and teaching in stability and control and for professional leadership
- Honorary Fellow of the American Institute of Aeronautics and Astronautics
- Fellow of the Royal Aeronautical Society

== Personal life ==
Perkins married Jean Enfield in 1941, and they had two children, William and Anne. After Jean Perkins died in 1980, he married Nancy Wilson. Perkins died on January 6, 2008, at the age of 95.

== Selected works ==
- Perkins, Courtland D.; Hage, Robert (1949). Airplane Performance, Stability and Control. John Wiley & Sons.
