= United States Air Force Scientific Advisory Board =

American-based advisory organization

Department of the Air Force Scientific Advisory Board
Federal advisory committee overview
- Formed: 1944; 82 years ago
- Parent Department: United States Secretary of the Air Force
- Website: Official website

The Department of the Air Force Scientific Advisory Board (SAB) is a Federal Advisory Committee that provides independent advice on matters of science and technology relating to the United States Air Force (USAF) and United States Space Force (USSF) missions, reporting to the Secretary of the Air Force. In the past, it has provided advice on technologies such as supersonic aircraft, weather forecasting, satellite communications, medical research, crewless airplanes, and defenses against aircraft and missiles. Today, the SAB performs in-depth reviews of the Air Force Research Laboratory's science and technology research and performs studies on topics tasked by the Secretary and Chief of Staff. Members are appointed by the Secretary of Defense.

In May 2026, the Department of Defense published a notice renewing the DAF SAB as a discretionary federal advisory committee.

== History ==
The board was established in 1944 under the name Scientific Advisory Group with General Henry H. Arnold as the military director and Theodore von Kármán as the board chair. The group was asked to evaluate the aeronautical research and development programs and facilities of the Axis powers of World War II, and to provide recommendations for future United States Air Force research and development programs. The group's name was changed to the Scientific Advisory Board in 1946.

== DAF SAB Chairs ==
No.	Name	Term of Office	
No.	Name	Began	Ended
1	Theodore von Kármán (Chairman Emeritus −1963)	1946	1955
2	Mervin Kelly	1955	1956
3	James H. "Jimmy" Doolittle	1956	1959
4	Donald L. Putt	1959	1962
5	H. Guyford Stever	1962	1969
6	Courtland D. Perkins	1969	1973
7	Robert G. Loewy	1973	1977
8	Gerald P. Dinneen	1977	1978
9	Courtland D. Perkins	1978	1979
10	Raymond L. Bisplinghoff	1979	1982
11	Eugene E. Covert	1982	1986
12	Robert W. Lucky	1986	1989
13	Edwin B. Stear	1989	1990
14	Harold W. Sorenson	1990	1993
15	Gene McCall	1993	1996
16	Natalie Crawford and William F. Ballhaus Jr. (co-chairs)	1996	1999
17	Robert W. Selden	1999	2002
18	Daniel E. Hastings	2002	2005
19	Heidi Shyu	2005	2008
20	John Betz	2008	2011
21	Eliahu Niewood	2011	2014
22	Werner J.A. Dahm	2014	2017
23	James Chow	2017	2020
24	Nils Sandell	2022	2025
