= Robert B. Anderson =

American politician (1910–1989)

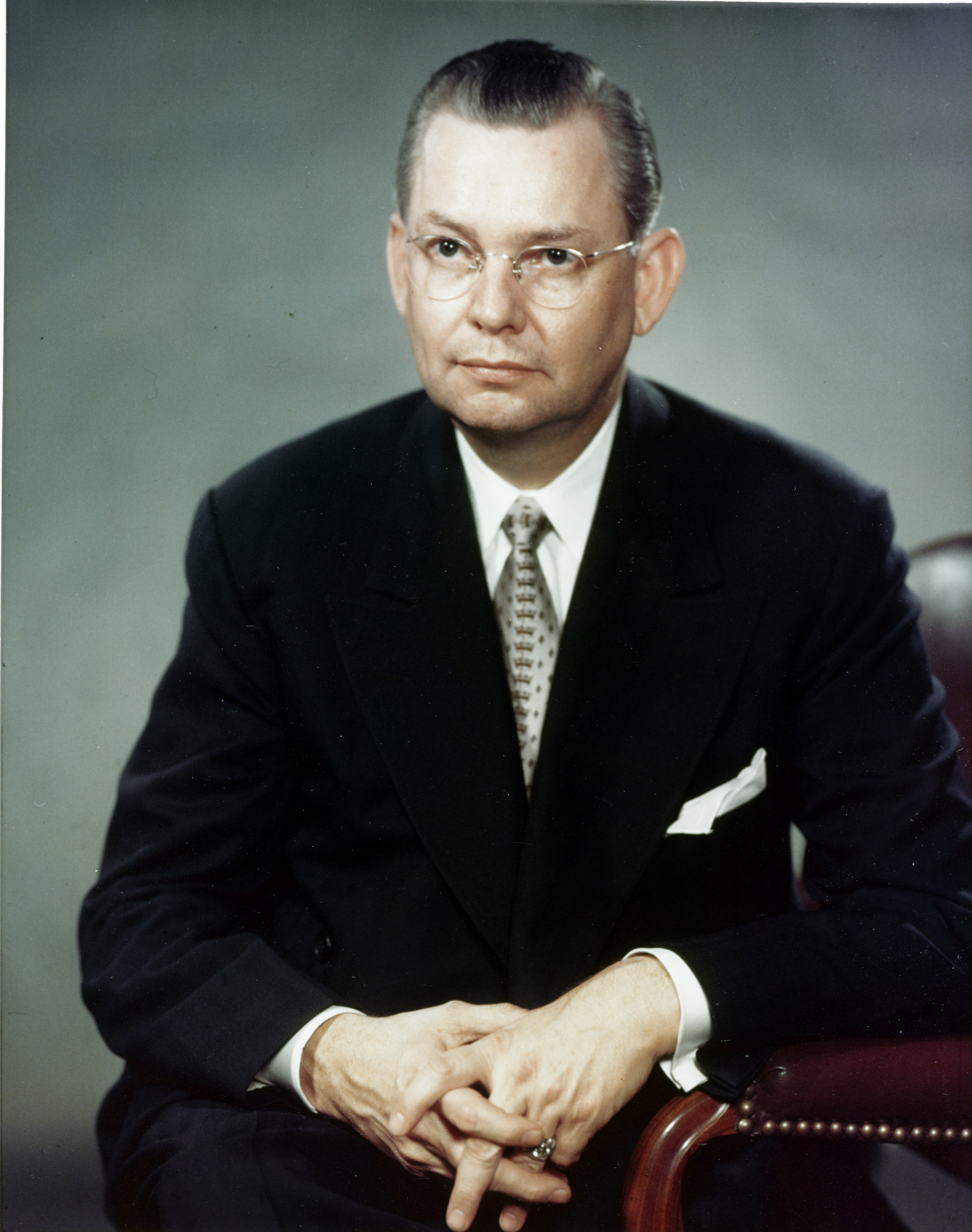
- Official portrait, c. 1953

56th United States Secretary of the Treasury
- In office July 29, 1957 – January 20, 1961
- President: Dwight D. Eisenhower
- Preceded by: George M. Humphrey
- Succeeded by: C. Douglas Dillon

5th United States Deputy Secretary of Defense
- In office May 3, 1954 – August 4, 1955
- President: Dwight D. Eisenhower
- Preceded by: Roger M. Kyes
- Succeeded by: Reuben B. Robertson Jr.

52nd United States Secretary of the Navy
- In office February 4, 1953 – March 3, 1954
- President: Dwight D. Eisenhower
- Preceded by: Dan A. Kimball
- Succeeded by: Charles Thomas

Texas State Tax Commissioner
- In office January 1935 – November 1936
- Governor: James V. Allred
- Preceded by: H. P. Edwards
- Succeeded by: Marvin Hall

Assistant Attorney General of Texas
- In office September 1, 1933 – 1934

Member of the Texas House of Representatives from the 99th district
- In office January 10, 1933 – September 11, 1933
- Preceded by: John Holland Veatch
- Succeeded by: Edgar Emmett Hunter

Personal details
- Born: Robert Bernard Anderson; June 4, 1910 Burleson, Texas, U.S.
- Died: August 14, 1989 (aged 79) New York City, U.S.
- Party: Republican (1956–1989)
- Other political affiliations: Democratic (before 1956)
- Spouse: Ollie Rawlins (m. 1935; died 1987)
- Children: 2
- Education: Weatherford College (BA); University of Texas at Austin (LLB)

Robert Bernard Anderson (June 4, 1910 – August 14, 1989) was an American administrator, politician, and businessman. He served as the Secretary of the Navy between February 1953 and March 1954. He also served as the Secretary of the Treasury from 1957 until 1961, and was one of President Dwight Eisenhower's closest confidants.

In 1987, two years before his death from throat cancer, he was disbarred for illegal banking operations and tax evasion. In the 1980s, Anderson illegally operated an Anguilla-based bank. The bank was involved in money laundering for drug traffickers. Anderson pleaded guilty to criminal violations of the banking laws, and was sentenced to prison.

== Early life ==
Anderson was born in Burleson, Texas on June 4, 1910, to Robert Lee Anderson and his wife Elizabeth Haskew "Lizzy" Anderson. He was a high school teacher prior to entering the University of Texas Law School, from which he graduated in 1932. He thereafter engaged in political, governmental, law and business activities in the state of Texas.

== State government service ==
Upon leaving the University of Texas School of Law in 1932, Anderson soon became an Assistant Attorney General for the State of Texas where he worked in 1933–1934. By 1934, he moved onward to become a State of Texas Tax Commissioner.

By 1939–1940, Anderson pursued opportunities within the private sector; he and two other partners purchased the City of Austin-based KTBC radio station from the Texas Broadcasting Company. In 1943, not able to increase KTBC's broadcasting power from the Federal Communications Commission (FCC), the three partners sold KTBC to Lady Bird Johnson, wife of then-Representative and future President Lyndon B. Johnson.

== Marriage and children ==
Anderson married Ollie Mae Rawlins on April 10, 1935. The couple had two sons, Gerald Lee and James Richard. The Anderson family later moved to Cleburne, Texas. Ollie Anderson died in Greenwich, Connecticut of Alzheimer's disease on May 31, 1987.

== Federal government service ==
According to the Seagraves, Anderson was with Douglas MacArthur and Edward Lansdale inspecting the Philippine caves containing Yamashita's gold immediately after World War II ended. (Note: On October 19, 1945, Edward Lansdale arrived in Manila Bay aboard the US Army Transport Ship (USAT) USS Uruguay.)

During his time as Navy Secretary, he ended the last formal vestiges of racial segregation in the Navy and advocated the force levels and technological advances necessary to maintain a flexible defense strategy. In May 1954, Anderson left his Navy post to become Deputy Secretary of Defense. He received the Medal of Freedom in 1955. From 1957 to 1961, he served as Eisenhower's Secretary of the Treasury.

Eisenhower was particularly impressed by Anderson's abilities, believing him to be more than capable of being president himself, and named him as one of his leading choices to be his running mate in 1956 if Vice-President Richard Nixon had accepted Eisenhower's recommendation to leave the vice-presidency to serve as Secretary of Defense. However, Nixon opted to remain on the ticket with Ike. As 1960 approached, although Eisenhower acknowledged that Nixon certainly had the Republican presidential nomination sewn up, Eisenhower privately pressed Anderson to enter the primaries and to challenge Nixon, but Anderson declined. Once Nixon was nominated, Eisenhower suggested that he select Anderson as his running mate, but Nixon chose Henry Cabot Lodge Jr. instead. Eisenhower said Anderson "is just about the ablest man that I know, He would make a splendid President."

In 1959, as Secretary of the Treasury, Anderson supported the creation of the International Development Association, after pressure from then-Senator Mike Monroney (D-Oklahoma). Anderson was close to Sid Richardson and Clint Murchison who was very close to FBI Director J. Edgar Hoover. Many Texas oilmen including Murchison, formerly a close associate of Lyndon B. Johnson, ended their relationships with Johnson when Johnson became vice president on John F. Kennedy's 1960 presidential ticket because Kennedy advocated tax reform on oil companies and their investments.

In 1963, President Kennedy appointed Anderson to a special committee to study the United States foreign aid program. In 1964 following Panamanian riots, President Johnson appointed him as special ambassador to Panama where he conducted negotiations for a new treaty on the status of the Panama Canal. At the same time, Anderson served as chairman of a Congressional study commission to determine if building a sea level canal through Panama was possible. He succeeded in negotiating a preliminary treaty to transfer the Canal to the control of Panama, but, before the treaty was ratified by the legislature of Panama, General Omar Torrijos overthrew the Panamanian government in October 1968 and rejected the proposed treaty. In June 1973, he resigned his ambassador post, unable to secure agreement on another preliminary treaty proposal and was replaced by Ellsworth Bunker who agreed to Panamanian demands to a rapid transition to control by Panama and the subsequent Bunker negotiated treaty was ratified in 1978 for transfer of the Panama Canal from United States jurisdiction to Panama jurisdiction and control.

During the 1960s, he carried out diplomatic missions on behalf of President Lyndon B. Johnson, including many trips to Cairo to confer with Egyptian President Gamal Abdel Nasser in the wake of the 1967 Six-Day War.

== Private business and death ==
After leaving office in 1961, Anderson moved to New York City and was active in business, investment, banking affairs, oil, and real estate. Anderson owned the Anderson group, headquartered at One Rockefeller Plaza in New York City, where he had business interests in a number of international projects.

He established the Robert Anderson & Company Limited in Hong Kong on August 19, 1961, and operated it as a private company limited by shares until December 29, 1972, when it was dissolved.

He was unsuccessful in establishing a free port in Malta.

Anderson was a director on the Hong Kong Resort Company board. He had a casino investment with Edward Wong Wing-cheung, who founded HKR in May 1973.

He was a lobbyist for the Rev. Sun Myung Moon's Unification Church during the 1980s.

Anderson's career ended in personal suffering. He was hospitalized several times for alcoholism. From 1983 to 1985, he and his partner David B. Gould illegally operated the Commercial Exchange Bank and Trust of Anguilla, British West Indies, which had an unlicensed New York branch office. The bank lost $4.4 million and several investors lost their life savings in the mid-1980s, including record producer Ethel Gabriel. The bank also laundered large amounts of cash for drug traffickers. In 1987, Anderson, who was charged by Rudolph Giuliani as the United States Attorney for the Southern District of New York, pleaded guilty to criminal violations of the banking laws and to tax evasion, and was sentenced to prison. The Supreme Court of New York Appellate Division, in disbarring Anderson from the practice of law, called his disbarment "a sad but we think necessary end to the legal career of one who has in times less beclouded by poor and corrupt judgment served his country in high office as Secretary of Treasury, Deputy Secretary of the Navy and as Special Ambassador to Panama during the Panama Canal negotiations."

Anderson died of throat cancer following his cancer surgery in New York City on August 14, 1989. He was buried in Rose Hill Cemetery in Cleburne, Texas.

The Robert B. Anderson Papers 1933–89 were deposited at the Eisenhower Library at Abilene, Kansas, between 1992 and 1996 with more in July 2001 and gifted to the Eisenhower Library on December 26, 2001, by Gerald Anderson, son of Robert Anderson.

== See also ==
- M-Fund

== Notes ==
Government offices
Preceded by Dan A. Kimball	United States Secretary of the Navy; February 4, 1953 – March 3, 1954	Succeeded by Charles S. Thomas
Political offices
Preceded by Roger M. Kyes	United States Deputy Secretary of Defense; 1954–1955	Succeeded by Donald A. Quarles
Preceded by George M. Humphrey	U.S. Secretary of the Treasury; Served under: Dwight D. Eisenhower; 1957–1961	Succeeded by C. Douglas Dillon
