= Reuben B. Robertson Jr. =

American businessman who served as United States Deputy Secretary of Defense

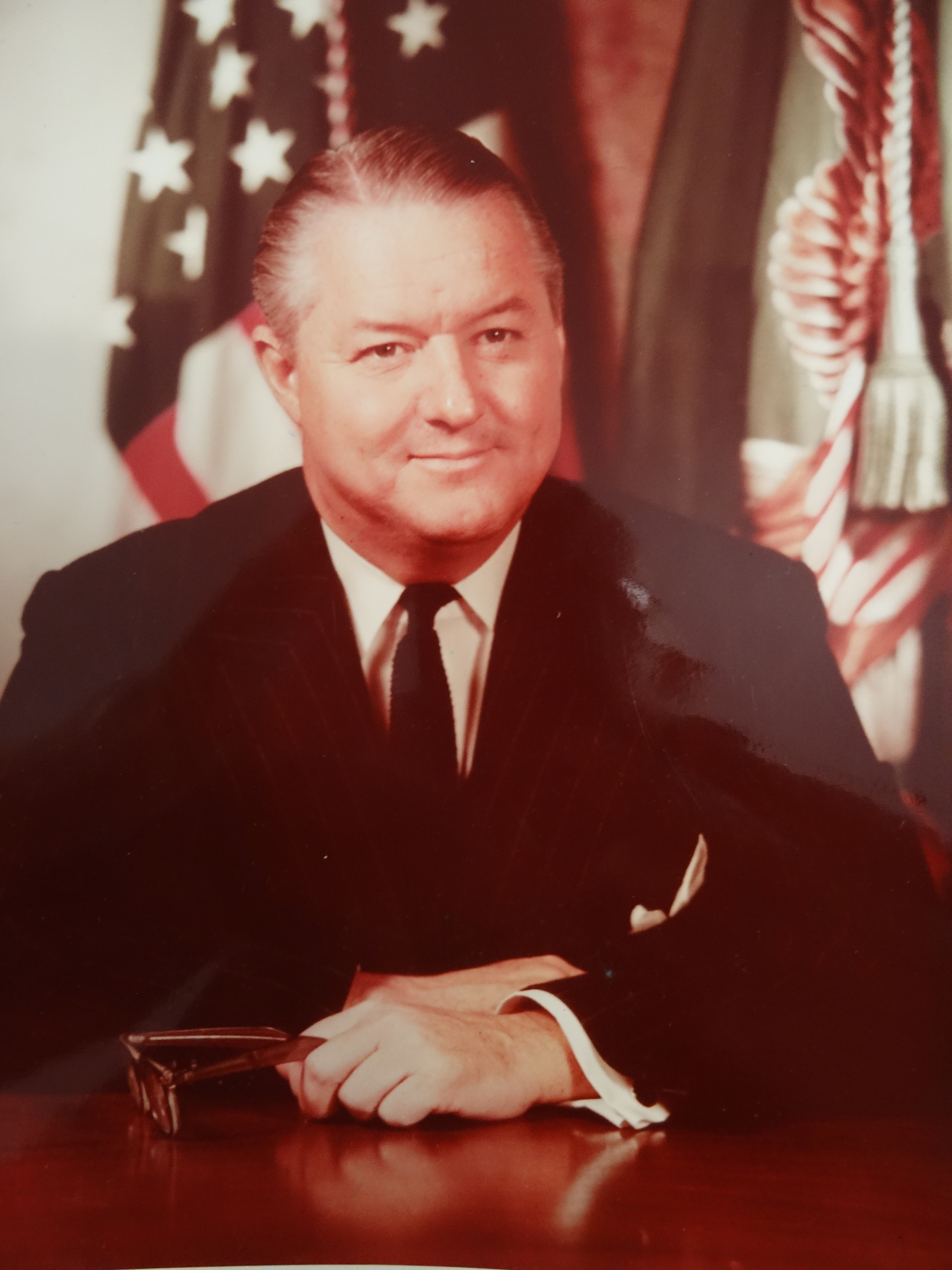

6th United States Deputy Secretary of Defense
- In office August 5, 1955 – April 25, 1957
- President: Dwight D. Eisenhower
- Preceded by: Robert B. Anderson
- Succeeded by: Donald A. Quarles

Personal details
- Born: June 27, 1908 Asheville, North Carolina, U.S.
- Died: March 13, 1960 (aged 51) Cincinnati, Ohio, U.S.
- Party: Republican

Reuben B. Robertson Jr. (June 27, 1908 – March 13, 1960) was an American businessman who served as United States Deputy Secretary of Defense from 1955 to 1957.

He died on March 13, 1960, in Cincinnati, Ohio, after being hit by a motorist.
