= Dudley C. Sharp =

American politician (1905–1987)

Dudley Sharp
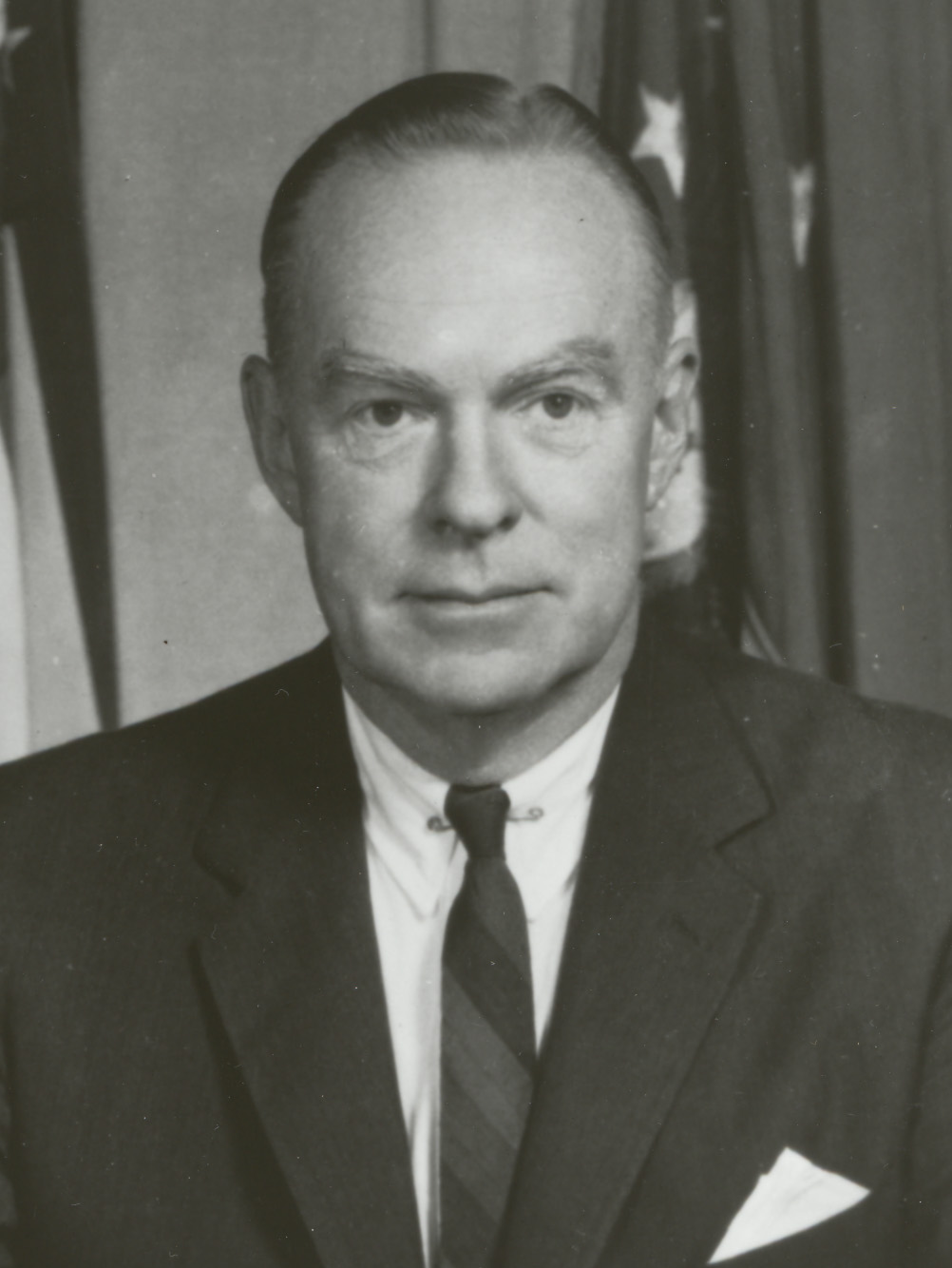

United States Secretary of the Air Force
- In office December 11, 1959 – January 20, 1961
- President: Dwight D. Eisenhower
- Preceded by: James H. Douglas Jr.
- Succeeded by: Eugene M. Zuckert

United States Under Secretary of the Air Force
- In office August 3, 1959 – December 11, 1959
- President: Dwight D. Eisenhower
- Preceded by: Malcolm A. MacIntyre
- Succeeded by: Joseph V. Charyk

Personal details
- Born: March 16, 1905 Houston, Texas, U.S.
- Died: May 17, 1987 (aged 82) Houston, Texas, U.S.
- Party: Republican
- Education: Princeton University (BA)

Military service
- Branch/service: United States Navy
- Years of service: 1942–1945

Dudley Crawford Sharp (March 16, 1905 – May 17, 1987) was Secretary of the Air Force from December 11, 1959 until January 20, 1961, under president Dwight D. Eisenhower.

== Biography ==
Born in Houston, Texas, Sharp was the son of Walter Benona Sharp. He graduated from Princeton University in 1928 and joined the Mission Manufacturing Company of Houston, holding many positions within the firm. He served in the United States Navy from 1942 to 1945.

In 1955, he was appointed as Assistant Secretary of the Air Force for Materiel. Mr. Sharp was appointed Under Secretary of the Air Force in August 1959 and on December 11, 1959, he became Secretary of the Air Force and served until 1961.

Sharp was a friend from childhood of Howard Robard Hughes Jr. Dudley met Howard because both Howard and Dudley's fathers were business partners in the Sharp-Hughes Tool Company in Houston. Sharp was married to Tina Cleveland, daughter of Justina Latham and W. C. Cleveland of Houston.

Sharp died on May 17, 1987. He was 82 years old and lived in Houston, Texas.

Political offices
Preceded by Malcolm A. MacIntyre	United States Under Secretary of the Air Force; 1959	Succeeded by Joseph V. Charyk
Preceded by James H. Douglas Jr.	United States Secretary of the Air Force; 1959–1961	Succeeded by Eugene M. Zuckert
