= Charles Thomas (Secretary of the Navy) =

American politician (1897–1983)

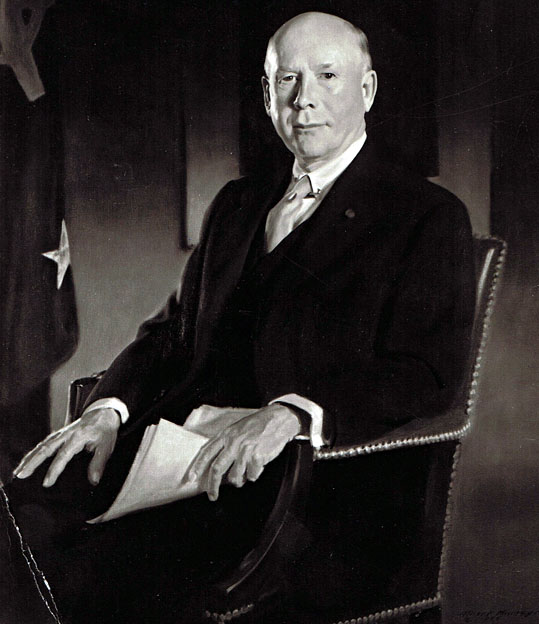

53rd United States Secretary of the Navy
- In office May 3, 1954 – April 1, 1957
- President: Dwight D. Eisenhower
- Preceded by: Robert B. Anderson
- Succeeded by: Thomas S. Gates Jr.

Assistant Secretary of Defense
- In office 1953–1954
- President: Dwight D. Eisenhower

Undersecretary of the Navy
- In office 1953
- President: Dwight D. Eisenhower

Personal details
- Born: Charles Sparks Thomas; September 28, 1897 Independence, Missouri, U.S.
- Died: October 17, 1983 (aged 86) Newport Beach, California, U.S.
- Party: Republican
- Education: University of California, Berkeley; Cornell University

Charles Sparks Thomas (September 28, 1897 – October 17, 1983) was an American politician who served as Secretary of the Navy from 1954 to 1957.

Thomas was born in Independence, Missouri, and he attended the University of California and Cornell University. During World War I, he served as a naval aviator. He joined the Eisenhower Administration in 1953 as Undersecretary of the Navy; later that year, he designated an Assistant Secretary of Defense.

During the 1930s, Thomas worked for Foreman and Clark. Thomas became president of Trans World Airlines on 2 July 1958, and served until 28 July 1960. He subsequently was the president of the Irvine Company, which developed sprawling Southern California suburbs, through 1966. Thomas was director of several large corporations, including Lockheed.

Government offices
Preceded by Francis P. Whitehair	Under Secretary of the Navy; February 9, 1953 – August 5, 1953	Succeeded by Thomas S. Gates Jr.
Preceded by Robert B. Anderson	Secretary of the Navy; May 3, 1954 – April 1, 1957	Succeeded by Thomas S. Gates Jr.
