= Eugene M. Zuckert =

American politician (1911–2000)

Eugene Zuckert
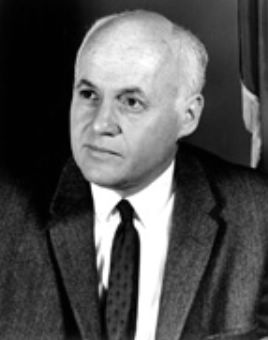

United States Secretary of the Air Force
- In office January 24, 1961 – September 30, 1965
- President: John F. Kennedy; Lyndon B. Johnson
- Preceded by: Dudley C. Sharp
- Succeeded by: Harold Brown

Personal details
- Born: Eugene Martin Zuckert; November 9, 1911 New York City, New York, U.S.
- Died: June 5, 2000 (aged 88) Washington, D.C., U.S.
- Party: Democratic
- Education: Yale University (BA, LLB); Harvard University (MBA)

Military service
- Branch/service: United States Navy
- Years of service: 1944–1945
- Rank: Lieutenant

Eugene Martin Zuckert (November 9, 1911 – June 5, 2000) was the seventh United States Secretary of the Air Force from January 23, 1961 to September 30, 1965. During his service as secretary, he witnessed the shifting of decision-making powers from the military departments to the Office of the Secretary of Defense, a process that continued throughout the 1960s. He observed that the Air Force ought to investigate technologies that would have some bearing on future aerospace military operations, leading to "Project Forecast," a study initiated in March 1963.

== Biography ==
Zuckert was born in New York City. He attended public elementary and high schools in suburban New York, received preparatory education at the Salisbury School, Salisbury, Connecticut, and earned his bachelor of arts degree from Yale University in 1933. Zuckert entered the combined Yale Law School-Harvard Business School course sponsored by William O. Douglas, who later served on the Supreme Court. That course, a pioneer experiment by Yale and Harvard, supplemented legal training with administration to foster an awareness of the business problems of clients. After graduation, Zuckert became a member of both the Connecticut and New York Bars. He later became a member of the Bar in the District of Columbia.

In 1940, he became an instructor in government and business relations at the Harvard Graduate School of Business Administration, and later he became an assistant dean. While at Harvard he also served as a special consultant to the commanding general of the Army Air Forces in developing statistical controls.

In 1944, Zuckert entered the US Navy as a lieutenant and worked in the Office of the Chief of Naval Operations, where he was assigned to the service's inventory control program. In September 1945, he was released from the Navy to become executive assistant to the administrator, Surplus Property Administration, under W. Stuart Symington. When Symington became assistant secretary of war for air in February 1946, Zuckert became his special assistant.

With the passage of the National Security Act in 1947 and Symington's subsequent appointment as the first secretary of the Air Force, Zuckert took the oath as assistant secretary of the Air Force. His principal duties were in the field of management.

He helped institute Symington's program of "Management Control Through Cost Control," an initiative to place the U.S. Air Force on a business-like basis, using accepted industrial practices as a yardstick for establishing Air Force procedures. Zuckert represented the Air Force in the formulation of the fiscal 1950 budget, the first joint Army-Navy-Air Force budget in U.S. history.

The accomplishment that Zuckert considered his most professionally satisfying stemmed from President Harry S. Truman's 1948 directive requiring the armed services to abolish segregation. Working with Lieutenant General Idwal H. Edwards, head of Air Force personnel, Zuckert oversaw implementation of the integration program. In addition, Zuckert served as the Air Force member of the Interservice Committee created by Secretary of Defense James Forrestal to develop a Uniform Code of Military Justice for the Department of Defense.

Remaining in the secretariat after Thomas K. Finletter succeeded Symington as secretary, Zuckert was charged with handling the "highly controversial and vexatious problem of the civilian components, including the reserves and the Air Force National Guard." As Finletter concentrated more on larger issues, such as the North Atlantic Treaty Organization and nuclear weapons development, Zuckert dealt with the daily operations of the office. When he left his position as assistant secretary in February 1952 to become a member of the Atomic Energy Commission, he left an Air Force cost-control system that had established a new high point in sound business administration within the military establishment, and he had secured a personal reputation as one of the top-flight, younger career officials in government.

In December 1960, Robert S. McNamara, President-elect John F. Kennedy's designee for secretary of defense, recommended to Kennedy that Zuckert be appointed Air Force secretary. Zuckert was nominated and confirmed in January 1961. With nearly six years of Air Force experience, Zuckert was better prepared for and more knowledgeable about the secretariat and its organization than any previous appointee. Zuckert was involved in controversies associated with the XB-70, AGM-48 Skybolt, and the TFX (later the F-111) weapon systems, and with direct participation in the war in Vietnam. Both he and Air Force Chief of Staff General Thomas D. White opposed the administration's decision to cut the XB-70 bomber. Zuckert later admitted that he erred in promoting the bomber because of its increasing vulnerability to enemy defenses.

The TFX was a tactical fighter-bomber designed and built for both the Air Force and the Navy. In negotiations over the development of that weapon, Zuckert supported the administration, which wanted the plane, against the Air Force, which did not. In so doing, he strained his relationship with the Air Force and lost a measure of the confidence it had placed in him. When the Skybolt missile was canceled in December 1962, Zuckert and the Air Staff were allied, as they had been during the XB-70 debate, against the secretary of defense and the administration. Zuckert often found himself to be the "man in the middle," at times supporting the Air Force against the secretary of defense and the administration.

Shortly after Zuckert left office in September 1965, the Air Force instituted the Zuckert Management Award, which is given annually in September to a general officer or high-level civilian for "outstanding management performance." The award perpetuates Secretary Zuckert's commitment to sound and effective management within the Air Force. Zuckert himself attended every awards ceremony through 1998.

Until his retirement in 1988, Zuckert practiced law, did consulting and was active in pursuing his long-standing interest in corporate governance. Over the years he served as a director of several small, technically oriented companies. On June 5, 2000, Eugene Zuckert died at the age of 88 of pneumonia complicated by a heart ailment.

Political offices
Preceded by Dudley C. Sharp	United States Secretary of the Air Force; 1961–1965	Succeeded by Harold Brown
