= Roswell Gilpatric =

American lawyer and government official

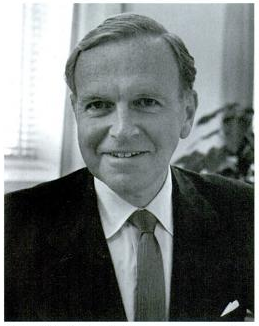

10th United States Deputy Secretary of Defense
- In office January 24, 1961 – January 20, 1964
- President: John F Kennedy; Lyndon B. Johnson
- Preceded by: James H. Douglas Jr.
- Succeeded by: Cyrus Vance

United States Under Secretary of the Air Force
- In office October 19, 1951 – February 5, 1953
- President: Harry S. Truman
- Preceded by: John A. McCone
- Succeeded by: James H. Douglas Jr.

Personal details
- Born: Roswell Leavitt Gilpatric; November 4, 1906 Brooklyn, New York, U.S.
- Died: March 15, 1996 (aged 89) New York City, New York, U.S.
- Resting place: Mount Desert Island, Maine
- Education: Yale University (JD)

Roswell Leavitt Gilpatric (November 4, 1906 – March 15, 1996) was a New York City corporate attorney and government official who served as Deputy Secretary of Defense from 1961–64, when he played a pivotal role in the high-stake strategies of the Cuban Missile Crisis, advising President John F. Kennedy as well as Robert McNamara and McGeorge Bundy on dealing with the Soviet nuclear missile threat. Gilpatric later served as Chairman of the Task Force on Nuclear Proliferation in 1964.

== Early life and career ==
Gilpatric was born in 1906 in Brooklyn, the son of Wall Street attorney Walter Hodges Gilpatric, an Amherst College graduate born in Warren, Rhode Island, and the former Charlotte Elizabeth Leavitt, a graduate of Mount Holyoke College, born to American missionary parents in Osaka, Japan.Charlotte Elizabeth Leavitt, Class of 1902, Mount Holyoke College, mtholyoke.edu Charlotte Leavitt was a college classmate and lifelong friend of Frances Perkins, the first woman appointed to a Presidential Cabinet. On his mother's side Roswell Gilpatric was related to Harvard College astronomer Henrietta Swan Leavitt, whose father was the Congregational minister George Roswell Leavitt.

Gilpatric attended Poly Preparatory Country Day School from 1917 to 1920, when the family moved to White Plains, where he attended high school for two years before transferring to the Hotchkiss School, where he was a member of the remarkable class of 1924 that included Charles W. Yost, Paul Nitze, and Chapman Rose. His duties as a scholarship boy, which included waiting on tables and cleaning rooms, kept down his participation in extracurricular activities at Hotchkiss, but he was a member of the Cum Laude Society.

He graduated from Yale University in 1928, Phi Beta Kappa; and then from Yale Law School in 1931, where he was an editor of the Yale Law Journal. Following his graduation, Gilpatric went to work for the New York City law firm of Cravath, Swaine & Moore, where he became a partner and where he practiced when not serving in government. Gilpatric owed much of his political cachet to his special relationship with the celebrated lawyer, diplomat and investment banker Robert A. Lovett, to whom Gilpatric was a protégé.

Gilpatric served as Under Secretary of the Air Force from 1951 to 1953. During 1956 and 1957, Gilpatric was a member of the Rockefeller Brothers' Special Studies Project. Gilpatric was a childhood friend of Governor Nelson Rockefeller.

== Deputy Secretary of Defense ==
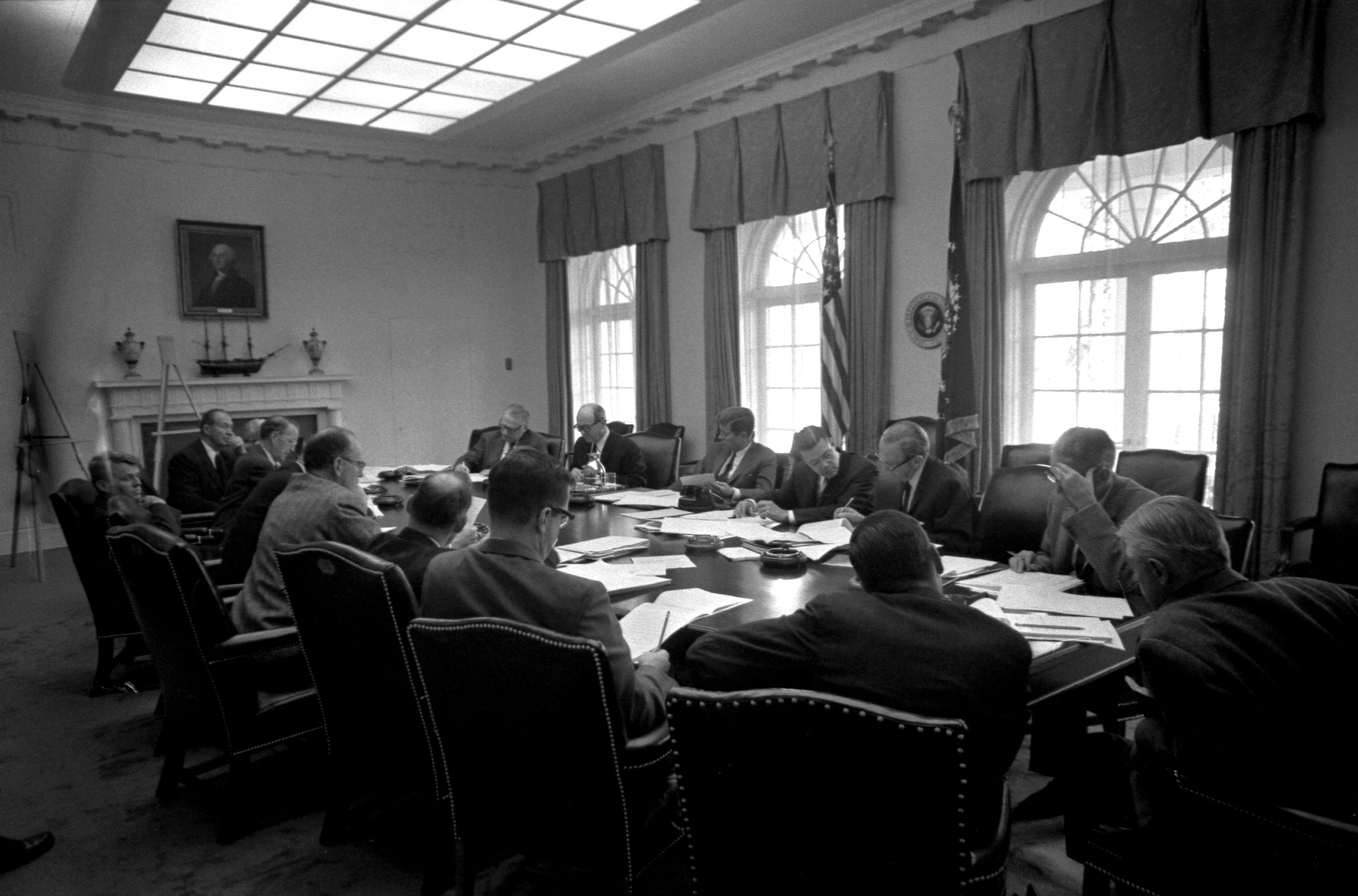
EXCOMM meeting, Cuban Missile Crisis, October 29, 1962: Roswell Gilpatric at second from President Kennedy's left

Gilpatric joined the new Kennedy administration in 1961 as part of the wave of Kennedy appointments. His appointment was unusual: he was one of the few Pentagon leaders handpicked by the new president. Fearing that the new Secretary of Defense, Robert S. McNamara, was inexperienced in Washington's ways, Kennedy chose Gilpatric to add experience to his Defense team. McNamara was known as a "whiz kid", a Midwestern industrial production wunderkind. But Kennedy sensed that McNamara would need a strong lieutenant who was savvy in the ways of Washington.

Kennedy chose Gilpatric as the Pentagon's number two, passing over Paul Nitze, Gilpatric's old classmate from Hotchkiss, who had wanted the job. It was a propitious appointment: within a few months, the dashing Eastern lawyer and his Midwestern boss were finishing each other's sentences. McNamara frequently started out with the expression: "Ros and I...."

As the Cuban crisis began to unfold, Gilpatric was appointed to the EXCOMM team, the top-level working group appointed by Kennedy to assess the Soviet missile threat in Cuba. At one point during the tense standoff of the Cuban Missile Crisis, McGeorge Bundy was arguing for United States bombing of Cuba to eliminate the threat of a Soviet nuclear attack. McNamara countered, arguing that there should be no bombing because the Soviet Russian response was unpredictable.

It was at this critical moment that Gilpatric stepped in to settle the argument. "Essentially, Mr. President," Gilpatric was recorded telling Kennedy, "this is a choice between limited action and unlimited action, and most of us think it is better to start with limited action." It was Gilpatric's intervention that changed the direction of the discussion, according to Harvard professor and former Department of Defense official Graham T. Allison, who authored a book, Essence of Decision, about the crisis. Proposing the blockade was McNamara and Gilpatric's solution to providing President Kennedy with a strong response – but short of the airstrike that McGeorge Bundy and others were pushing. By crafting their solution, and with the normally reticent Gilpatric speaking up forcefully for it, the two managed to change the thrust of policy. The President followed Gilpatric and McNamara's recommendation.

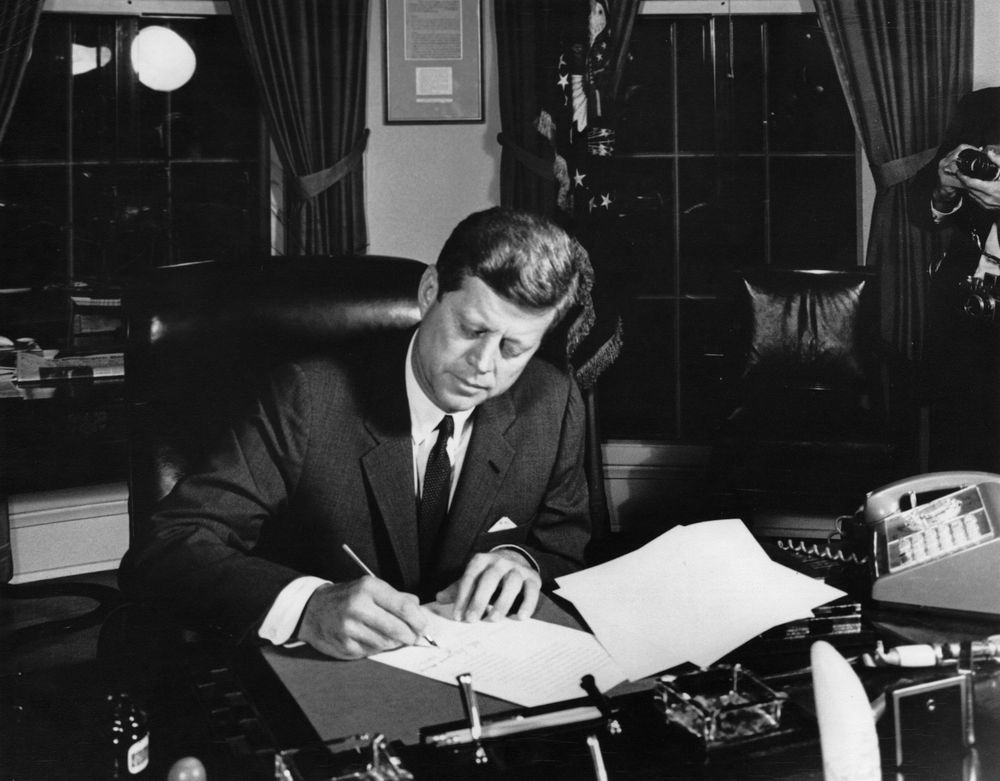
President Kennedy signing order authorizing naval blockade of Cuba, as urged by Roswell Gilpatric

Gilpatric was not always so dovish. He often took a hard line against the Communist threat, and was not above using force in other matters of international security. In the Eisenhower administration, Gilpatric headed a secret task force charged with "preventing Communist domination of Vietnam." Gilpatric argued forcefully for U.S. commitment to halt the Communist threat in South Vietnam. In his position with the Kennedy administration, Gilpatric later signed off on the overthrow of the Diem government. Gilpatric was also a member of a special task force which hatched "Operation Mongoose", a dirty tricks campaign aimed at destabilizing the government of Fidel Castro in Cuba.

At the same time, Gilpatric showed that he could be intellectually flexible on occasion. When it came to the admission of China into the United Nations, for instance, Gilpatric argued forcefully in a letter to The New York Times, written during his Eisenhower years, that the United States should stop trying to block the Communist country's admission into the international governing body. "By no longer trying to block Communist China's admission to the United Nations the United States might be able to bring about a reduction in tensions in southeast Asia that would lessen the chances of further Communist 'nibbling' or 'brush-fire' type of aggression."

Gilpatric did not always face an easy task while acting as go-between for the Pentagon generals and the White House. For example, Kennedy developed such an intense dislike of General Curtis Lemay that every time his name came up, Kennedy went ballistic.

"I mean he just would be frantic at the end of a session with LeMay", Gilpatric recalled, "because, you know, LeMay couldn't listen or wouldn't take in, and he would make what Kennedy considered ... outrageous proposals that bore no relation to the state of affairs in the 1960s. And the President never saw him unless at some ceremonial affair, or where he felt he had to make a record of having listened to LeMay, as he did on the whole question of an air strike against Cuba. And he had to sit there. I saw the President right afterwards. He was just choleric."

It was Gilpatric's calm demeanor and good judgment, wrote Robert F. Kennedy, that led his brother the President to rely on Gilpatric, especially in times of crisis. When McNamara met the Brooklyn-born lawyer at Kennedy's suggestion, according to historian Arthur Schlesinger Jr., he found Gilpatric "easy, resourceful and intelligent, and the partnership was immediately sealed." Gilpatric made himself an "indispensable" figure in the Kennedy administration, wrote longtime JFK aide Ted Sorensen.

As an attorney, Gilpatric represented aviation inventor and high-tech pioneer Sherman Fairchild, who left Gilpatric a bequest in his will. Gilpatric was awarded an honorary degree by Bowdoin College in Brunswick, Maine, citing his years of government service, as well as his part-time residency in Maine.

== Alleged lover of Jackie Kennedy ==
Gilpatric sometimes attracted the attention of the press in his personal life, and he was often linked romantically to former First Lady Jackie Kennedy. A fellow Wall Street attorney offered for sale in the 1970s a trove of personal letters between Gilpatric and the former First Lady. The correspondence spanned five years. The controversial airing of his private correspondence with the former First Lady so annoyed Gilpatric that he formally requested that four letters written to him by Jackie Kennedy be withdrawn for sale by the auction house as they had been stolen from his New York City law office at Cravath.

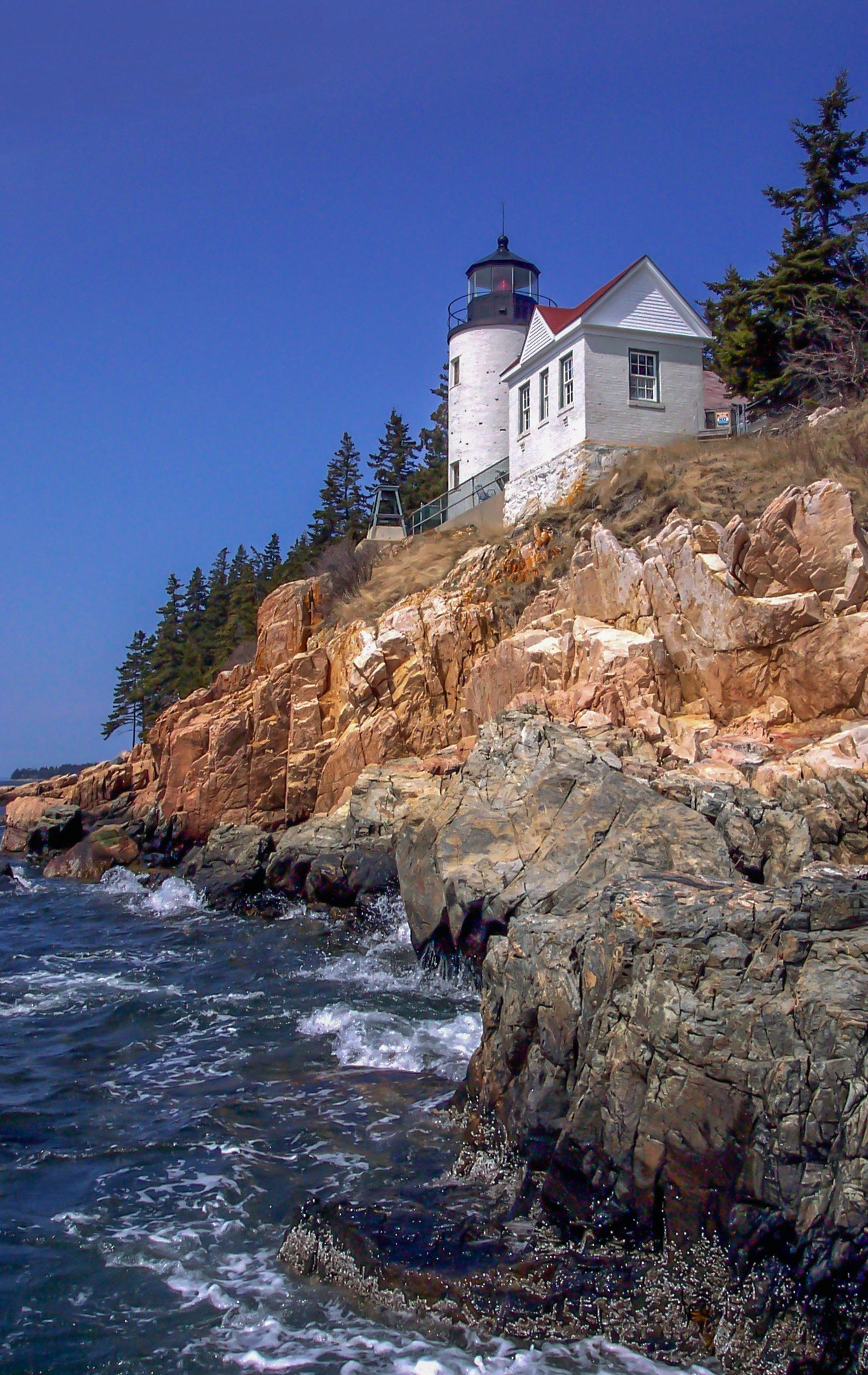
Mount Desert Island, Maine, burial place of Roswell Leavitt Gilpatric

After her marriage to Aristotle Onassis, Jackie Kennedy Onassis wrote to Gilpatric: "I hope you know all you were and are and will ever be to me. With my love, J." Gilpatric maintained that he and the former First Lady had been only friends, although he was her frequent escort and many press accounts suggested they had a romantic relationship. "In private," said The Independent in its obituary, "he was widely believed to have been the lover of Jacqueline Kennedy Onassis." Between marriages, Gilpatric had frequently accompanied the former First Lady to Palm Beach, Florida, where Gilpatric had a home.

== Watergate ==
Another strange twist involved Gilpatric after his death, when a 2008 book by former acting director of the FBI L. Patrick Gray alleged that Gilpatric, back in private practice and with Time magazine as a client at the time of the Watergate break-in, learned from sources at the magazine that a senior official at the FBI was leaking to Sandy Smith, one of its reporters. Gray claimed that outraged by such behavior, Gilpatric tipped off Nixon administration officials to the identity of the official.

In Gray's version of events, Gilpatric called his acquaintance former Attorney General John Mitchell and told Mitchell that the informer was FBI official W. Mark Felt, the same official later identified by other sources to be Deep Throat. Mitchell in turn, Gray claimed, urged then-Attorney General Richard G. Kleindienst to pressure Gray to fire Felt. In early 2008, Gilpatric's son John threw cold water on the claim. Roswell Gilpatric had never mentioned knowing John Mitchell, his son told The New York Times.

But as recorded by the then-secret Nixon White House taping system, Nixon, Gray and chief domestic adviser John Ehrlichman appear to confirm Gray's version in a conversation recorded on February 16, 1973, as the three discussed the alleged press leaks by Mark Felt. During the discussion, Nixon suggested that they bring in Felt's accuser:

President: Well, why don't you get in the fellow that's made the charge, then.
Ehrlichman: Well, maybe that's (unintelligible)
President: Of course he's, of course he's, he's not a newsman, on the other hand.
Ehrlichman: No.
President: He's a lawyer...
Ehrlichman: That's right.
President: ...for Time.
Gray: I know who he is, Mr. President.

== Federal Reserve and philanthropy ==
Gilpatric served as chairman of the Federal Reserve Bank of New York, and was a longtime trustee of the New York Public Library, New York University and the Woodrow Wilson Foundation. He also served as a vice chairman and trustee of the Metropolitan Museum of Art, and chaired the Metropolitan Museum of Art's 100th Anniversary Committee. Gilpatric was also a longtime member of the Council on Foreign Relations. He retired as partner with Cravath, Swaine & Moore, where he served as presiding partner from 1966 to 1977.

Gilpatric had many clients; they included the Graham family of The Washington Post Company, on whose board of directors he sat. Gilpatric was also a lecturer at Yale Law School, and a member of Yale University Council from 1957 to 1962.

== Private life ==
For much of his life he lived on Sutton Place in Manhattan. An avid tennis player and sailor, Gilpatric had three children. He was married five times. At his death, he was married to Miriam Thorne Gilpatric, the widow of diplomat Landon Ketchum Thorne, Jr., father of Julia Thorne, first wife of United States Senator John F. Kerry.

Gilpatric died of prostate cancer on March 15, 1996, in New York City, and was buried in Somesville, Maine, where he had a summer home. Gilpatric's papers during his government service are part of the John F. Kennedy Presidential Library.

Government offices
Preceded by John A. McCone	United States Under Secretary of the Air Force; October 19, 1951 – February 5, 1953	Succeeded by James H. Douglas, Jr.
Preceded by James H. Douglas, Jr.	United States Deputy Secretary of Defense; 1961–1964	Succeeded by Cyrus Vance
