= Joseph V. Charyk =

American scientist (1920–2016)

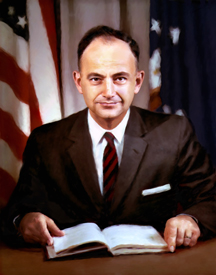

1st Director of the National Reconnaissance Office
- In office September 6, 1961 – March 1, 1963
- President: John F. Kennedy
- Succeeded by: Brockway McMillan

7th United States Under Secretary of the Air Force
- In office January 28, 1960 – March 1, 1963
- President: Dwight D. Eisenhower; John F. Kennedy
- Preceded by: Dudley C. Sharp
- Succeeded by: Brockway McMillan

Personal details
- Born: Joseph Vincent Charyk; September 9, 1920 Canmore, Alberta, Canada
- Died: September 28, 2016 (aged 96) Delray Beach, Florida, U.S.
- Education: University of Alberta; California Institute of Technology
- Occupation: Government official, space scientist

Joseph Vincent Charyk (September 9, 1920 – September 28, 2016) was widely credited as the founder of the geosynchronous communications satellite industry. He was born in Canmore, Alberta to a Ukrainian family. Early in his career, Charyk consolidated the Central Intelligence Agency, United States Air Force, and United States Navy space programs into the National Reconnaissance Office (NRO). He brought the first United States imagery satellite, CORONA, into operation and demonstrated signals intelligence technology from space. During his tenure, the NRO operated the U-2 reconnaissance aircraft and managed development of the A-12.

In 1980, Charyk was elevated to the grade of IEEE fellow for leadership in the development and application of communications satellite systems.

Charyk served as Chief Scientist of the United States Air Force until he was appointed the Undersecretary of the Air Force. In 1961 he was appointed by President John F. Kennedy to be the first Director of the National Reconnaissance Office. He later returned to aerospace industry, serving as first president of Communications Satellite Corporation. Charyk decided to make geosynchronous satellites the basis of the Comsat network. He fought skepticism that this untested technology would not work for voice transmission because of a half-second time delay. He also raised funds to support this new industry and enlisted the cooperation of countries around the world. His efforts launched a global system that would eventually seem commonplace to billions of people around the world. While at Comsat, Charyk served as president, CEO, and chairman from 1963 to 1985.

Charyk earned his bachelor's degree in engineering and physics from the University of Alberta and his PhD in aeronautics from the California Institute of Technology. In 1973 Charyk was inducted into the National Academy of Sciences and National Academy of Engineering for "basic contributions relating to space flight and leadership in development of communications satellites". In 1974 he received the International Emmy Directorate Award for his work with COMSAT. In 1987 President Ronald Reagan awarded Charyk the National Medal of Technology and Innovation "[f]or employment of the concept of the geosynchronous communications satellite systems as the basis for a global telecommunications system, established by international agreement, and for his guidance in the development and growth of the Intelsat system, which today services over 150 nations and territories". Charyk died on September 28, 2016, at the age of 96.

Government offices
Preceded by Dudley C. Sharp	United States Under Secretary of the Air Force; January 28, 1960 – March 1, 1963	Succeeded by Brockway McMillan
