= Brockway McMillan =

American government official

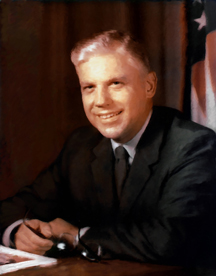

2nd Director of the National Reconnaissance Office
- In office March 1, 1963 – October 1, 1965
- President: John F. Kennedy; Lyndon B. Johnson
- Preceded by: Joseph V. Charyk
- Succeeded by: Alexander H. Flax

Personal details
- Born: March 30, 1915 Minneapolis, Minnesota, U.S.
- Died: December 3, 2016 (aged 101) Sedgwick, Maine, U.S.
- Education: Massachusetts Institute of Technology
- Occupation: Scientist, government official

Brockway McMillan (March 30, 1915 – December 3, 2016) was an American government official and scientist, who served as the eighth Under Secretary of the Air Force and the second Director of the National Reconnaissance Office.

McMillan was born in Minneapolis, Minnesota, in 1915, the only child of Franklin Richardson McMillan, a civil engineer, and Luvena Lucille Brockway McMillan, a schoolteacher. He received his B.S. in 1936 and a Ph.D. 1939 from Massachusetts Institute of Technology (MIT) on his thesis The calculus of discrete homogenous chaos, supervised by Norbert Wiener. He also served in the U.S. Navy at Dahlgren and Los Alamos during World War II. He joined Bell Telephone Laboratories 1946 as a research mathematician and published the article "The Basic Theorems of Information Theory" and proved parts of Kraft's inequality, sometimes called the Kraft-McMillan theorem (Kraft proved that if the inequality is satisfied, then a prefix code exists with the given lengths. McMillan showed that unique decodeability implies that the inequality holds.)

McMillan served as the president of the Society for Industrial and Applied Mathematics (SIAM) 1959-1960.

McMillan became assistant director of systems engineering in 1955 and was named director of military research in 1959. From 1961 to 1965 he was with the U.S. Air Force as assistant secretary for research and development and then undersecretary of the Air Force. He rejoined Bell Labs in 1965 and retired in 1979 as vice-president for military development. He was an IEEE Fellow, past president of SIAM, and member of several mathematical organizations.

McMillan promoted the development of a second generation of reconnaissance satellites: the KH-5 Argon (produced 1961–65) satellite mapping system, and KH-6 Lanyard (in use 1963), the first attempt to acquire higher resolutions imagery. He advocated maintaining the National Reconnaissance Office as the primary United States agency in space reconnaissance.

In 1942, while at Princeton University, McMillan married Elizabeth Audrey Wishard (1915–2008), who had received a PhD in mathematics from Radcliffe College in Cambridge, Massachusetts, in 1938. He died on December 3, 2016, at his home in Sedgwick, Maine, at the age of 101.

== See also ==
- Shannon–McMillan–Breiman theorem
