= Clifford Furnas =

American distance runner

1st President of the University at Buffalo
- In office 1962–1966
- Preceded by: Himself as Chancellor
- Succeeded by: Martin Meyerson

Chairman of the Defense Science Board
- In office 1961–1965
- Preceded by: Howard P. Robertson
- Succeeded by: Robert L. Sproull

9th Chancellor of the University of Buffalo
- In office 1957–1962
- Preceded by: Claude E. Puffer (Acting)
- Succeeded by: Himself as President

Assistant Secretary of Defense for Research and Engineering
- In office 1955–1957
- Preceded by: Donald A. Quarles
- Succeeded by: Frank D. Newbury

Personal details
- Born: October 24, 1900
- Died: April 27, 1969 (aged 68)
- Party: Republican
- Spouse: Sparkle M. Furnas

Clifford Cook Furnas (October 24, 1900 – April 27, 1969) was an American author, Olympic athlete, scientist, expert on guided missiles, university president, and public servant. He was first cousin of the author Evangeline Walton. Furnas participated in the 5,000-meter event at the 1920 Olympic Games in Antwerp, Belgium.

He taught chemical engineering at Yale University, and directed the airplane division of Curtiss-Wright during World War II. He became the ninth chancellor of the private University of Buffalo in 1954. After guiding the University through the merger process with the State University of New York in 1962, Furnas became the first president of the State University of New York at Buffalo. Between 1955 and 1957 he was on a leave of absence to serve as Assistant Secretary of Defense during the Eisenhower administration.

He retired from the University of Buffalo in 1966 and died in 1969 at age 68.

== Athletic career ==
- 1920 Olympic Games, Antwerp, Belgium
- 1922 Big Ten Conference Medal, for best combined scholastic and athletic record

== Education ==
- 1922 B.S., with honors, Purdue University
- 1926 Ph.D., University of Michigan
- 1946 Honorary Doctor of Engineering, Purdue University
- 1957 Honorary Doctor of Engineering, University of Michigan
- 1958 Honorary Doctor of Laws, Alfred University
- 1960 Honorary Doctor of Science, Thiel College
- 1963 Degree Honoris Causa, Universidad Nacional de Asunción of Paraguay

== Academic career ==
- 1922–1924 Math teacher, Shattuck School, Minnesota
- 1924–1925 Research Chemist, U.S. Steel Corporation
- 1926–1931 Physical Chemist, U.S. Bureau of Mines
- 1931–1941 Associate Professor of Chemical Engineering, Yale University
- 1941–1942 Technical aide at the National Defense Research Committee
- 1943–1946 Director of Curtiss-Wright Aeronautical Research Laboratory in Buffalo, New York
- 1946–1954 Director and Executive Vice President, Cornell Aeronautical Laboratory
- 1954–1962 Chancellor, University at Buffalo
- 1962–1966 President, State University of New York at Buffalo
- 1962–1966 President, Western New York Nuclear Research
- 1966–1969 President Emeritus, State University of New York at Buffalo

== Government career ==
- 1952–1953 Chairman, Guided Missile Commission, Research and Development Board
- 1954–1957 Chairman, U.S. Department of Defense Advisory Panel on Aeronautics
- 1954–1969 Member, U.S. Army Science Advisory Panel
- 1955–1957 Member of the National Advisory Committee for Aeronautics
- 1955–1957 Assistant Secretary of Defense for Research and Development
- 1956–1957 Chairman, Air Navigation Development Board
- 1957–1969 Member of the Defense Science Board
- 1958–1969 Member of the Naval Research Advisory Committee
- 1961–1965 Chairman of the Defense Science Board
- 1961–1969 Chairman, New York Advisory Council, Industrial Research and Development
- 1968–1969 Vice-Chairman, National Research Council

== Publications ==
- 1932 America's Tomorrow: An Informal Excursion Into the Era of the Two-hour Working Day
- 1935 The Unfinished Business of Science
- 1936 The Next Hundred Years (full view from HathiTrust)
- 1937 Man, Bread and Destiny
- 1937 Technological Trends and National Policy (section on metallurgy) (full view from Archive.org)
- 1939 The Storehouse of Civilization (full view from HathiTrust)
- 1940 The Individual and the World
- 1940 Excerpts from Our Intellectual World Sections 9-13, Division II of The Individual and the World
- 1948 Research in Industry
- 1957 "Sputnik: Why did the US lose the race? Critics speak up", Life Magazine, October 21, 1957
- 1966 The Engineer

Academic offices
Preceded by T. R. McConnell	Chancellor of the University at Buffalo; 1954–1962	Office abolished
New office	President of the University at Buffalo; 1962–1966	Succeeded by Claude E. Puffer (acting)
Government offices
Preceded by Donald A. Quarles	Assistant Secretary of Defense (Research and Development); 1955–1957	Succeeded by Frank D. Newbury
Preceded by Howard P. Robertson	Chairman of the Defense Science Board; 1961–1965	Succeeded by Robert L. Sproull
