= James H. Douglas Jr. =

American government official (1899–1988)

James Douglas
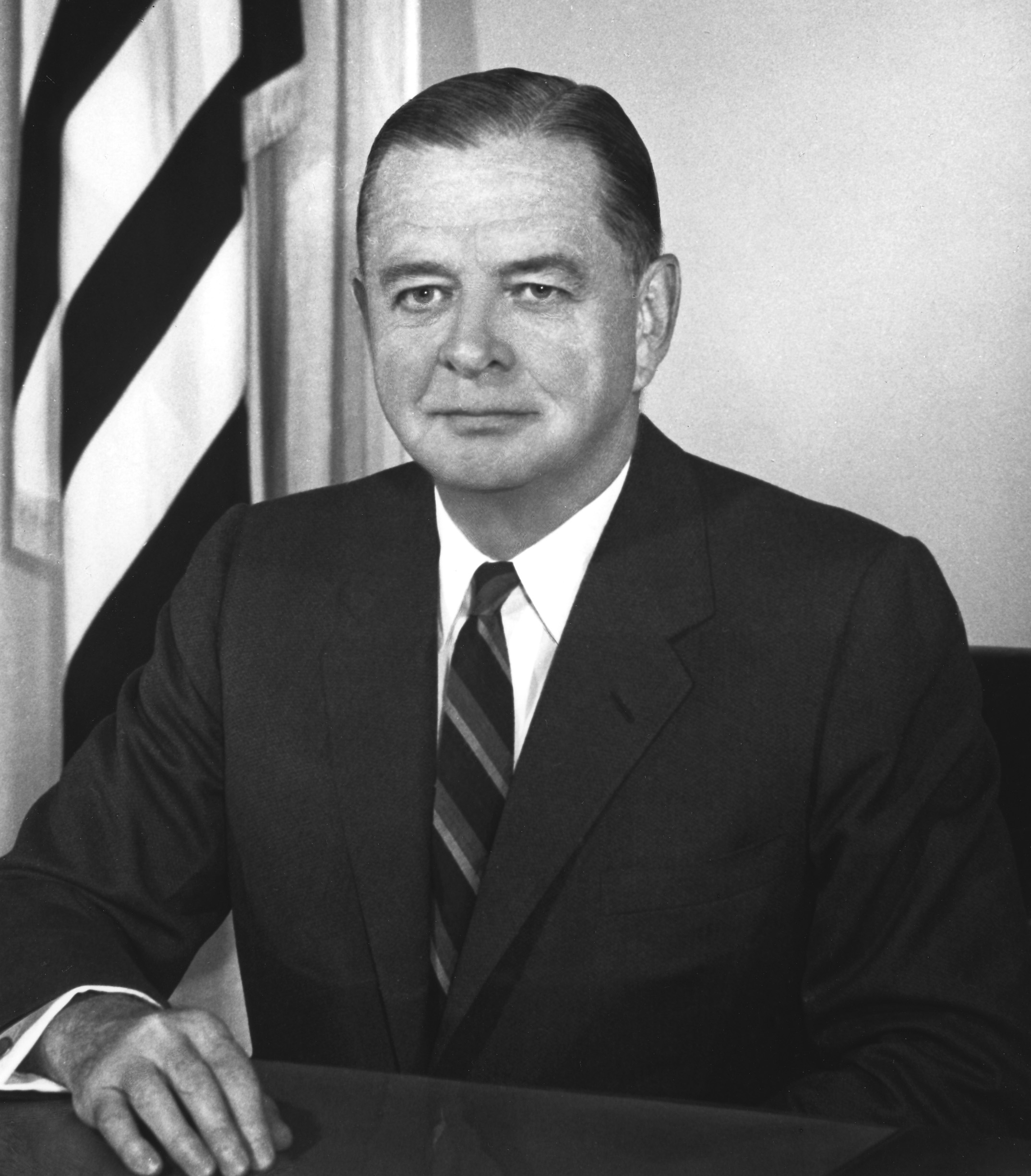

9th United States Deputy Secretary of Defense
- In office December 11, 1959 – January 24, 1961
- President: Dwight D. Eisenhower
- Preceded by: Thomas S. Gates Jr.
- Succeeded by: Roswell Gilpatric

5th United States Secretary of the Air Force
- In office May 1, 1957 – December 10, 1959
- President: Dwight D. Eisenhower
- Preceded by: Donald A. Quarles
- Succeeded by: Dudley C. Sharp

Personal details
- Born: James Henderson Douglas Jr. March 11, 1899 Cedar Rapids, Iowa, U.S.
- Died: February 24, 1988 (aged 88) Lake Forest, Illinois, U.S.
- Resting place: Lake Forest Cemetery
- Party: Republican
- Education: Princeton University (BA); Corpus Christi College, Cambridge (attended); Harvard University (LLB)

Military service
- Allegiance: United States
- Branch/service: United States Army
- Years of service: 1918–1945
- Rank: Colonel
- Unit: Army Air Forces

James Henderson Douglas Jr. (March 11, 1899 – February 24, 1988) was an American lawyer and government official who was Assistant Secretary of the Treasury, serving under both President Herbert Hoover and President Franklin Roosevelt. During the Eisenhower Administration, he served in the United States Department of Defense as Secretary of the Air Force and Deputy Secretary of Defense.

== Early life ==
Douglas grew up in the Lake Forest area near Chicago, Illinois. His family was quite wealthy, having co-founded the Quaker Oats Company.

He attended Princeton University, where he received a commission as a second lieutenant in the United States Army in 1918. He was initially assigned to Camp Hancock, Georgia. World War I ended before he could join a unit in Europe. After the war he returned to Princeton where he received a Bachelor of Arts degree in 1920. He attended Corpus Christi College, Cambridge for a year prior to returning the United States to study law at Harvard University, graduating with a law degree in 1924.

== Law and public service ==
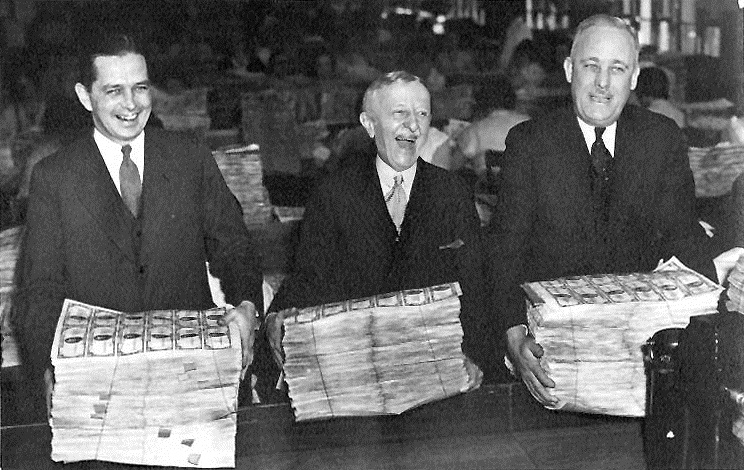
James H. Douglas Jr. during his tenure as Assistant Secretary of the Treasury

Douglas was admitted to the Illinois Bar in 1925, and joined the Chicago law firm of Winston, Strawn & Shaw, but left the firm after only a year to pursue opportunities in the investment banking. He join investment banking firm of Field, Glore & Company in 1929.

Near the end of the Hoover Administration, Secretary of the Treasury Ogden L. Mills recommended to President Hoover that Douglas be appointed as Assistant Secretary of the Treasury. Douglas began service as Assistant Secretary in February 1932. He continued in the position for a year under President Roosevelt. However, he did not agree with Roosevelt's monetary policies, and he resigned in June 1933. After leaving the Federal Government, he founded the Citizens Committee on Monetary Policy to oppose President Roosevelt's financial program.

After serving as Assistant Secretary of the Treasury, Douglas returned to Chicago to practice law. He joined the law firm of Gardner Carton. In 1934, Douglas became a senior partner, and the firm was renamed Gardner, Carton & Douglas. The firm would later be acquired by the Philadelphia-based law firm of Drinker Biddle & Reath.

== World War II ==
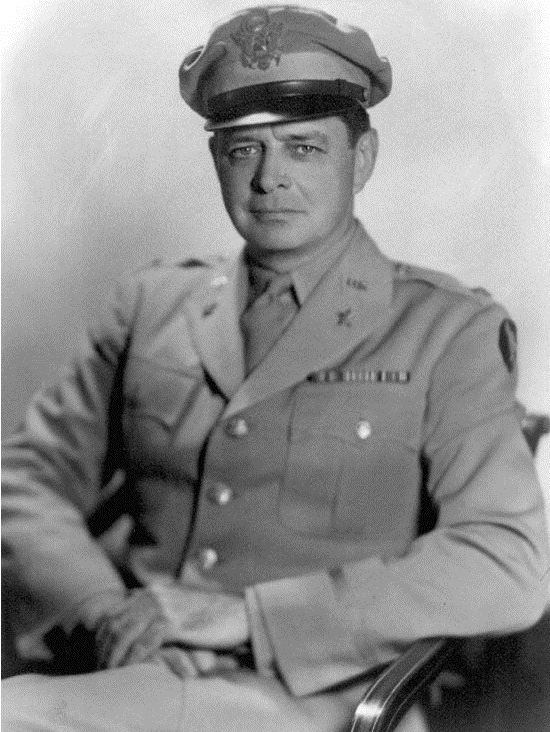
Colonel James H. Douglas Jr. during his World War II Service within U.S. Army Air Force

Douglas served in the Army Air Forces during World War II. He had duty assignments in South America, Africa, Europe, and Asia, rising from Major (United States) to Colonel in three and a half years. Much of his service time was spent in senior AAF staff positions including deputy chief of staff of the Air Transport Command and chief of staff for Air Training Command. He volunteered to accompany Brig. Gen. William H. Tunner to India as a staff member when Tunner was assigned to command the Hump Airlift in September 1944. He was awarded the Distinguished Service Medal for his war time service.

After the war, Douglas returned to Chicago to practice law with Gardner, Carton & Douglas where he remained a senior partner. He continued with the firm until March 1953 when President Eisenhower nominated him to become Under Secretary of the Air Force.

== Eisenhower Administration ==
Douglas quickly became was one of President Eisenhower key military advisors. He served as Under Secretary of the Air Force from 1953 until 1957. In January 1960, he became Deputy Secretary of Defense, filling the position left vacant since the sudden death of Donald A. Quarles in May 1959. He served as Deputy Secretary of Defense until the close of the Eisenhower Administration in January 1961.

== Secretary of the Air Force ==
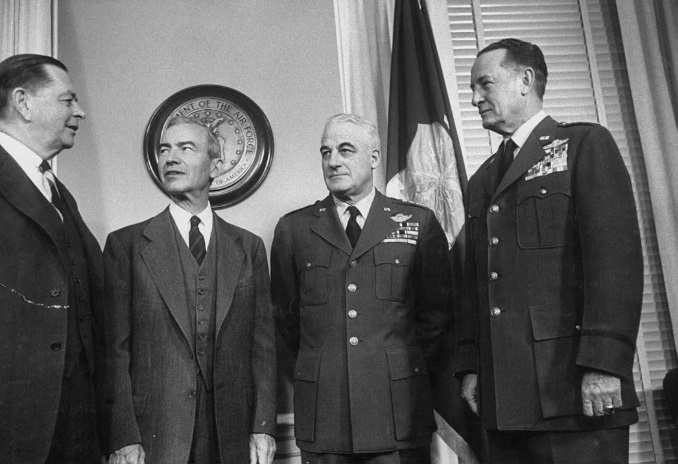
Secretary of the Air Force James H. Douglas Jr. with Chairman of the Joint Chiefs of Staff General Nathan F. Twining with Air Force Chief of Staff Thomas D. White and Deputy Secretary of Defense Donald A. Quarles at The Pentagon 1957

In May 1957, President Eisenhower appointed him as the fifth Secretary of the Air Force. He was the first Secretary of the Air Force to have previously served as a military air service officer. As Secretary of the Air Force, Douglas helped establish the United States Air Force Academy. He authorized the Air Force Commendation Medal to replace the Army version of the award. Douglas advised the President regarding a course of action in response to The Soviet Union’s launch of Sputnik I in October 1957. He also reaffirmed the 1925 court-martial verdict against air power advocate Brigadier General Billy Mitchell. He said the court was correct to have found Mitchell guilty of publicly attacking his superiors, but noted that time had proved Mitchell was right about the unique value of air power.

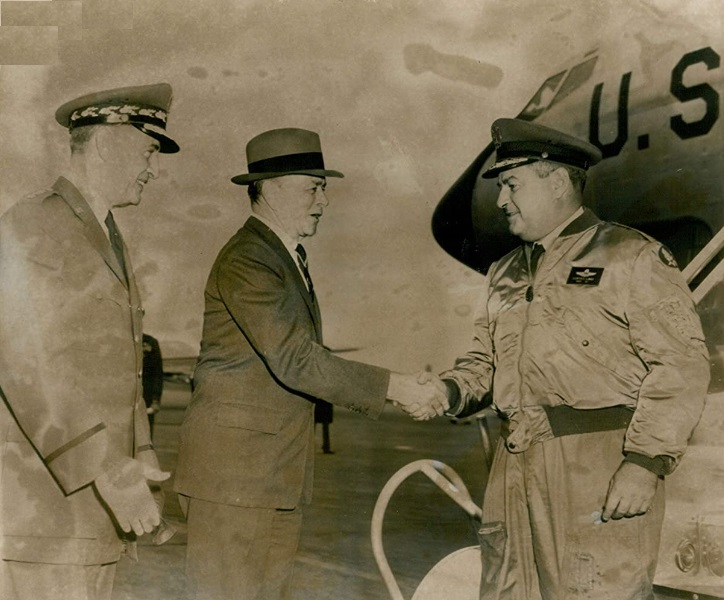
Secretary of the Air Force James H. Douglas Jr. with Chairman of The Joint Chiefs of Staff General Nathan F. Twining greeting Air Force Vice Chief of Staff General Curtis LeMay at Washington National Airport in November 1957

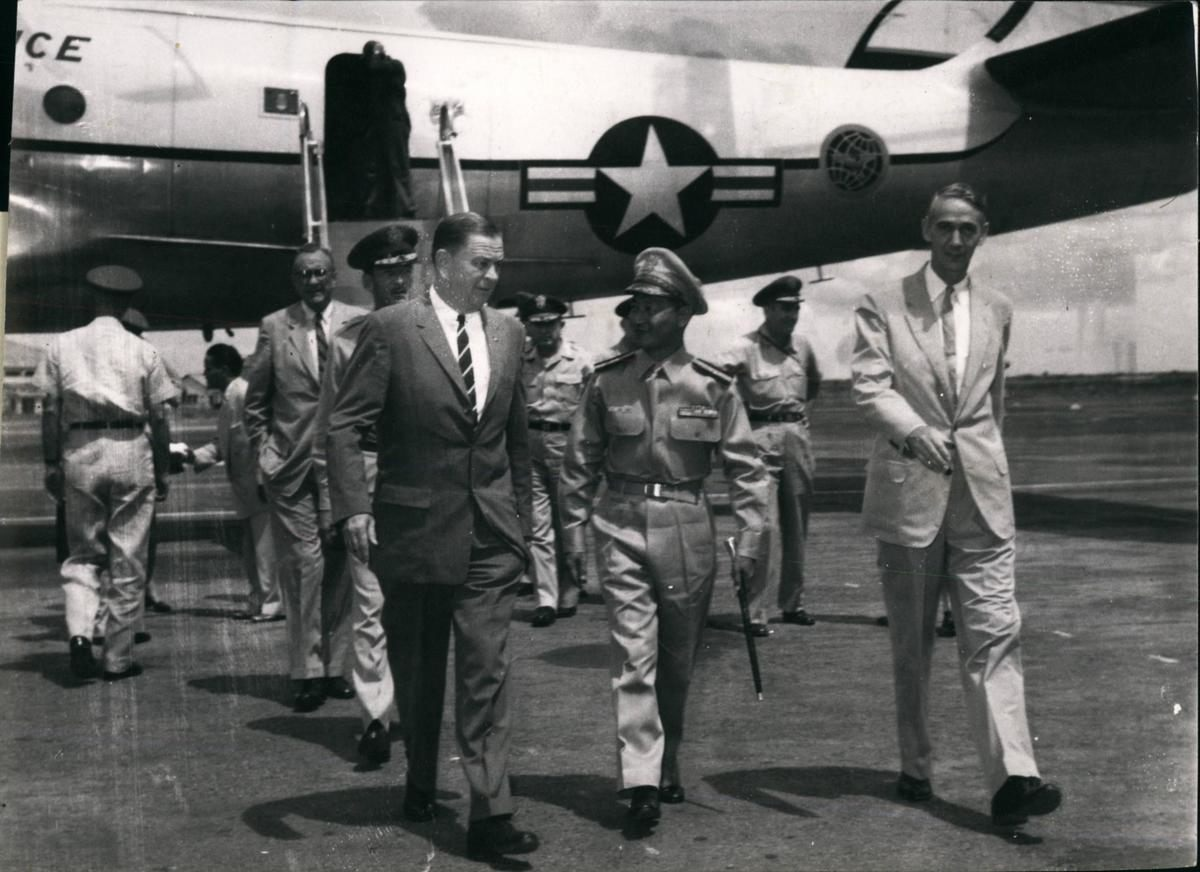
Secretary of The Air Force James H. Douglas Jr. during a visit to Saigon, South Vietnam

During his tenure as Secretary of The Air Force, Douglas also strengthened the force of The Strategic Air Command (SAC) as its main role as United States primary nuclear deterrence. As a result several of The Air Force bases are being transferred into Strategic Air Command's jurisdiction such as Bunker Hill Air Force Base in Indiana (later known as Grissom Air Force Base) and Vandenberg Air Force Base in California. Under the direction of Secretary Douglas, SAC also relocated its headquarters in Offutt Air Force Base, Nebraska from A Building to Building 500 (Now known as General Curtis E. LeMay Building) and received additional construction to modified its main command and control center, including SAC's underground command bunker. SAC also received additional fund to construct a new Post-Attack Command and Control System Facility, also known as The Notch in Hadley, Massachusetts and new Communications Annex Facility at Westover Air Force Base in Massachusetts.

In 1956 SAC received its new high-altitude strategic reconnaissance aircraft Martin RB-57D Canberra and in 1957 as part of The New Look massive retaliation program, Secretary Douglas ordered SAC's fleet of RB-57D to be relocated into Rhein-Main Air Force Base in West Germany in order to conduct reconnaissance missions within The Soviet Union Satellite Nations. During Douglas's tenure as Secretary of The Air Force, SAC also received a new strategic bomber aircraft, the Convair B-58 Hustler, the first strategic bomber aircraft with a capability to fly into Mach 2 speed and also a new tanker aircraft, the Boeing KC-135 Stratotanker, to replace the KC-97 Stratofreighter. The Air Force also received several new fighter aircraft such as the Republic F-105 Thunderchief, the Lockheed F-104 Starfighter and the McDonnell Douglas F-4 Phantom II during Douglas's tenure as Secretary of The Air Force.

In April 1959, the secretary of the air force issued implementing instructions to USAF to deploy two Jupiter squadrons to Italy. The two squadrons, totaling 30 missiles, were deployed at 10 sites in Italy from 1961 to 1963. In October 1959, the location of the third and final Jupiter MRBM squadron was settled when a government-to-government agreement was signed with Turkey. The U.S. and Turkey concluded an agreement to deploy one Jupiter squadron on NATO's southern flank (PGM-19 Jupiter). The deployment of US nuclear armed missiles in Turkey triggered the Cuban Missile Crisis. Douglas served as Secretary of the Air Force until the end of 1959.

Douglas also emphasized the importance role of the Air Force during the Second Indochina War which later became known as The Vietnam War. Douglas also suggested that strengthening the air power and the buildup of South Vietnam Air Force would eventually could help the South Vietnam push back the North Vietnamese communist forces. In 1957 under Secretary Douglas's direction, the Air Force sent several of their airmen in order to act as advisory and to train the Republic of Vietnam Air Force (RVNAF) and the RVNAF also began to receive several new U.S.-made aircraft such as the T-28A/B Trojan.

On January 18, 1961, President Eisenhower presented Douglas with the Medal of Freedom for his distinguished service to the United States. The citation recognized Douglas for his "many contributions to the nation's security". It also cited his "sound judgment, wise leadership and great devotion to his country", and his "firm and unyielding dedication to principles of good government".

== Later years ==
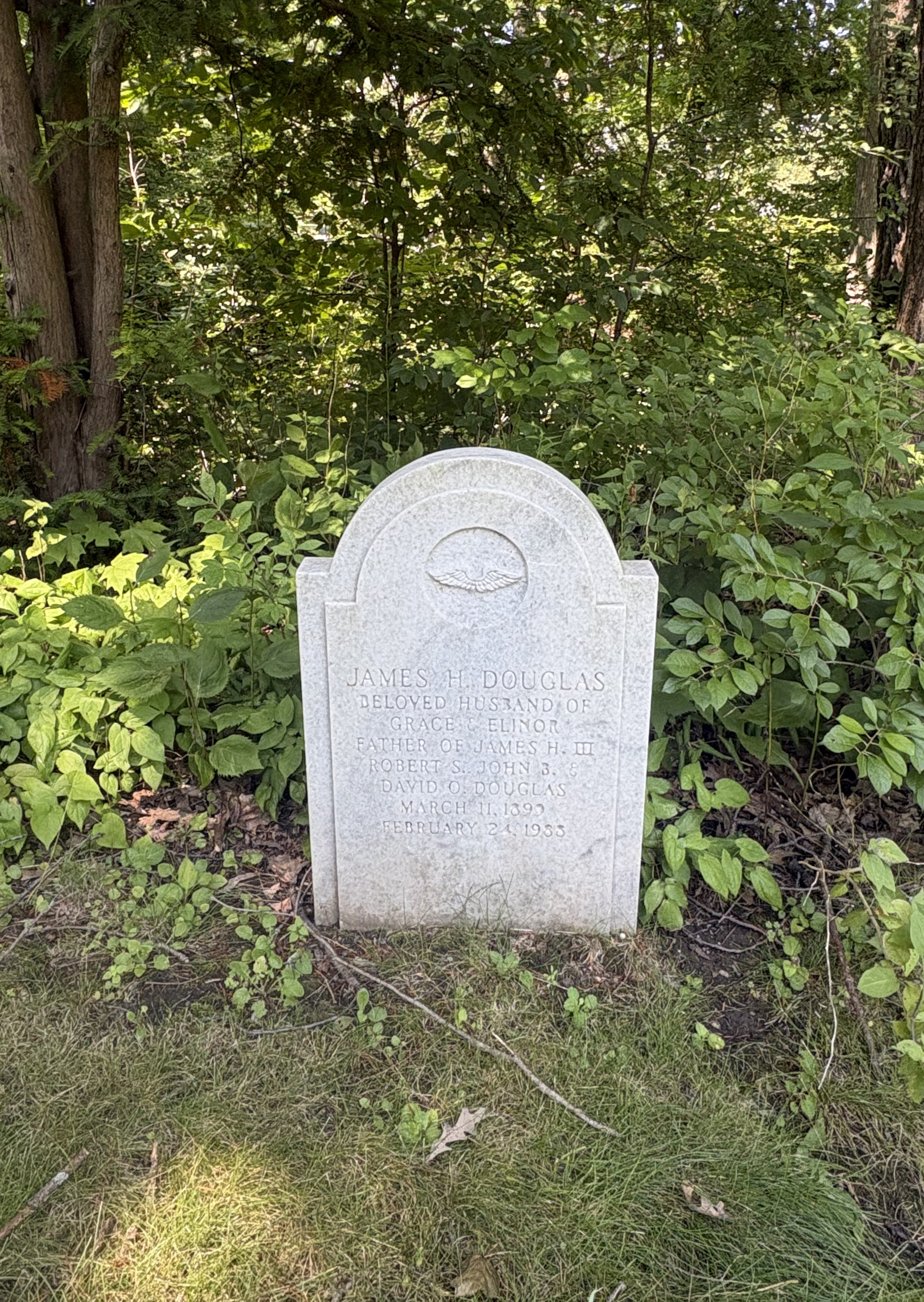
Douglas's grave at Lake Forest Cemetery

When he left the Department of Defense, Douglas once again returned to his law practice in Chicago. He served on the board of directors for American Airlines, March & McLennan, Chicago Title and Trust Company, and Metropolitan Life Insurance Company. He was a trustee of the University of Chicago for 55 years. Over his long career in law and government, Douglas was awarded honorary law doctorates from Princeton, Lake Forest College, and Grinnell College. He died of cancer in Lake Forest, Illinois on February 24, 1988, and was buried at Lake Forest Cemetery. He was 88 years old.

Political offices
Preceded by Donald A. Quarles	United States Secretary of the Air Force; 1957–1959	Succeeded by Dudley C. Sharp
Preceded by Thomas S. Gates Jr.	United States Deputy Secretary of Defense; 1959–1961	Succeeded by Roswell Gilpatric
