= Donald A. Quarles =

United States government official (1894–1959)

Donald Quarles
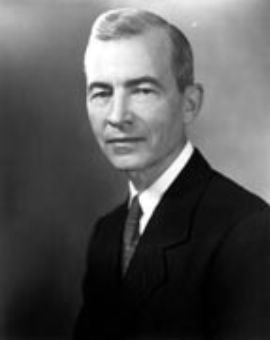

7th United States Deputy Secretary of Defense
- In office May 1, 1957 – May 8, 1959
- President: Dwight D. Eisenhower
- Preceded by: Reuben B. Robertson Jr.
- Succeeded by: Thomas S. Gates

4th United States Secretary of the Air Force
- In office August 15, 1955 – April 30, 1957
- President: Dwight Eisenhower
- Preceded by: Harold E. Talbott
- Succeeded by: James H. Douglas Jr.

Assistant Secretary of Defense for Research and Engineering
- In office September 1, 1953 – August 14, 1955
- President: Dwight D. Eisenhower
- Preceded by: Walter Whitman
- Succeeded by: Clifford C. Furnas

Personal details
- Born: Donald Aubrey Quarles; July 30, 1894 Van Buren, Arkansas, U.S.
- Died: May 8, 1959 (aged 64) Washington, D.C., U.S.
- Party: Republican
- Education: University of Missouri (attended); Yale University (BA)

Military service
- Branch/service: United States Army
- Years of service: 1917–1919
- Rank: Captain

Donald Aubrey Quarles (July 30, 1894 – May 8, 1959) was a communications engineer, senior level executive with Bell Telephone Laboratories and Western Electric, and a top official in the United States Department of Defense during the Eisenhower Administration. He served as both Secretary of the Air Force and Deputy Secretary of Defense.

== Early years ==
Born on July 30, 1894 in Van Buren, Arkansas, he graduated from Van Buren High School in 1910 at age 15. He taught mathematics in Van Buren High School, and attended summer school at University of Missouri until he was accepted into Yale University in 1912. He graduated from Yale with a bachelor of arts degree in 1916.

In May 1917, Quarles enlisted in the United States Army for service during World War I. He was a member of the 42nd Infantry Division (better known as the "Rainbow Division"). As an artillery officer, Quarles attained the rank of captain and served in France and Germany for two years.

== Laboratory engineer ==
After the war, Quarles went to work at Western Electric Company. During this time, he also studied theoretical physics at Columbia University on a part-time basis. In 1925, he joined Bell Telephone Labs in Murray Hill, New Jersey. Through the 1930s and early 1940s, Quarles continued to advance within the Bell Labs organization.

In 1940, he was selected as director of the Transmission Development Department which concentrated on military electronic systems, particularly radar development. He became director of Bell’s Apparatus Development in 1946. He was elected Mayor of Englewood, New Jersey, in 1946 to 1948. He then was vice president of Bell Telephone Laboratories in 1948. During this time, he was appointed to the new Committee on Electronics within the Department of Defense’s Joint Research and Development Board, becoming chairman of the Committee on Electronics in 1949. In March 1952, Quarles became vice president of Western Electric and president of Sandia Corporation. Sandia was a subsidiary company of Western Electric responsible for operating the Atomic Energy Commission’s Sandia National Laboratory in Albuquerque, New Mexico. Quarles was president of the American Institute of Electrical Engineers from 1952 to 1953.

== Public service ==
In September 1953, President Dwight D. Eisenhower appointed Quarles Assistant Secretary of Defense for research and development. Subsequently, he was jointly selected by both the Secretary of Defense and the Secretary of Commerce to be the chairman of the Air Navigation Development Board. In March 1954, President Eisenhower appointed Quarles to the National Advisory Committee for Aeronautics.

On August 11, 1955, President Eisenhower appointed Quarles as interim Secretary of the Air Force, and he was sworn into office August 15, 1955. The United States Senate confirmed his appointment on February 16, 1956. As Secretary, Quarles stressed the need to use cutting edge technology to maintain military superiority over the Soviet Union. He supported expanded funding for research and development programs, and pressed for rapid fielding of B-52 Stratofortress, F-102 Delta Dagger, and F-104 Starfighter aircraft.

He resigned as Secretary of the Air Force on April 30, 1957, to accept a new Presidential appointment as Deputy Secretary of Defense. He remained in that position until his sudden death from a heart attack in Washington, D.C., on May 8, 1959.

== Funeral ==
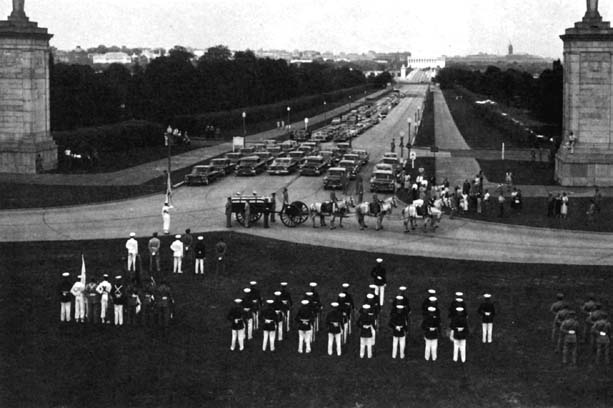
Donald Quarles' funeral procession at Arlington National Cemetery

Quarles was given a special military funeral arranged by Military District of Washington. Beginning at noon on May 11, 1959, his casket lay in the Bethlehem Chapel at the Washington National Cathedral for twenty-four hours. The funeral service was held in the nave of the cathedral the next day. Following the service, a hearse carried his casket to the Memorial Gate at Arlington National Cemetery where the casket was transferred to a caisson. A military escort, consisting of one platoon each from the Army, Navy, Marine Corps, Air Force, and Coast Guard lead the funeral procession to the grave site. Vice President Richard M. Nixon led the official party at public funeral service and Arlington procession, and President Eisenhower attended the graveside rites.

== Legacy ==
He was posthumously awarded the United States' Medal of Freedom in 1959. In 1966, a mountain range in Antarctica was named after Quarles. The Quarles Range was named at the outset of the International Geophysical Year and organization of U.S. activity in Antarctica.

== See also ==
- Beckman–Quarles theorem, discovered by and named after Quarles's son, Donald A. Quarles Jr.

Political offices
Preceded by Walter Whitman	Assistant Secretary of Defense for Research and Engineering; 1953–1955	Succeeded by Clifford C. Furnas
Preceded by Harold E. Talbott	United States Secretary of the Air Force; 1955–1957	Succeeded by James H. Douglas Jr.
Preceded by Reuben B. Robertson Jr.	United States Deputy Secretary of Defense; 1957–1959	Succeeded by Thomas S. Gates
