= Joachim Meyer (professor) =

Israeli Professor of Industrial Engineering

- יואכים מאיר
- Born: 1957 (age 68–69); Mülheim an der Ruhr, Germany
- Education: Ben-Gurion University of the Negev
- Scientific career
- Fields: Human Factors Engineering
- Workplaces: Tel-Aviv University, Ben-Gurion University of the Negev
- Thesis: Processing of graphic displays that present quantitative information (1994)
- Doctoral advisor: David Shinar, David Leiser

Joachim Meyer (Hebrew: יואכים מאיר; born: 1957) is Celia and Marcos Maus Professor for Data Sciences at the Department of Industrial Engineering at Tel-Aviv University. His work deals with human decisions in interactions with intelligent systems and he is a fellow of the Human Factors and Ergonomics Society.

== Early life and education ==
Joachim Meyer was born in Mülheim an der Ruhr, Germany. He emigrated to Israel in 1973, completed high school at the Kanot agricultural school, did IDF service and was discharged as a lieutenant.

Meyer began his academic studies in the Department of Behavioral Sciences at Ben-Gurion University of the Negev in 1979 and received his B.A. in 1982 (with honors), and M.Sc. in Psychology in 1986 (with honors). He then moved to the Department of Industrial Engineering and Management at Ben-Gurion University of the Negev where he completed his Ph.D. in 1994. His dissertation on Processing of graphic displays that present quantitative information was supervised by David Shinar and David Leiser.

== Academic career ==
Meyer was a research fellow at the Faculty of Industrial Engineering at the Technion - Israel Institute of Technology from 1993 until 1997. In 1995 he joined Ben-Gurion University of the Negev as a lecturer in the Department of Industrial Engineering and Management and the School of Management. He was promoted to senior lecturer in 1998, to associate professor in 2003, and to full professor in 2009.

In 2012, Meyer joined the Department of Industrial Engineering at Tel Aviv University as a professor and was chair of the department from 2015 until 2019.

Meyer held visiting academic positions at other universities and research institutes, including Harvard Business School and the Massachusetts Institute of Technology (MIT) where he was a Research Scientist at the Center for Transportation Studies (1999–2001) and helped to establish the MIT AgeLab. He was also a visiting professor at the Human Dynamics Group at the MIT Media Lab (2014–2015).

Meyer has supervised more than 75 graduate students and postdoctoral fellows.

== Research ==
Meyer's work focuses on modeling human decisions when interacting with intelligent systems. He combines methods and tools from psychology, economics, management science, and engineering, focusing on the development of models for predicting human decision making as a function of properties of the system, the situation, and the user. Applications are in various fields, including transportation, medicine, cyber security, privacy and management.

Meyer's initial research dealt with the visualization of information, demonstrating that the relative advantage of different forms of visualization depends on multiple factors and in particular on the structure of the displayed information.

Much of Meyer's research deals with aided decision making and specifically the effects of alarms, alerts and binary cues on decisions. He demonstrated that there are two different types of trust in these systems – compliance, and reliance. He also studies the active role people have in shaping the information they use for decision making, including the adjustment of thresholds of alerts, which tends to be incorrect and may even be practically impossible, because users don't have the necessary information.

In recent years he developed, together with his student Nir Douer, the ResQu (Responsibility Quantification) model of human responsibility, which is a method to quantify the responsibility of a human operator when using a system with advanced automation for tasks such as medical diagnostics, the identification of cyber-attacks, or the operation of advanced weapon systems. He has also studied behavioral aspects of cyber security, demonstrating that cyber risk taking is the combination of three behaviors (the Triad of Risk Related Behaviors), and developing models of different aspects of cyber security, such as the question when users’ actions should be blocked and when they should be warned.

Prof. Meyer has authored more than 170 scientific publications.

== Professional experience ==
Meyer was the chairperson of the Israeli Society for Human Factors Engineering and Ergonomics during 2005–2008. He was also a member of several committees of the Israeli Standards Institute and a member of the advisory committee of the National Authority for Traffic Safety at the Israel Ministry of Transportation.

Meyer is a member of the editorial board of Human Factors, and was on the editorial board of Journal of Experimental Psychology: Applied. He was also an associate editor of several journals including the Journal of Cognitive Engineering and Decision Making; IEEE Transactions on Human-Machine Systems; IEEE Transactions on Systems, Man, and Cybernetics – Part A.

== Honors and awards ==
In 2018 Meyer received the Jerome H. Ely Human Factors Article Award for the best paper in the Human Factors Journal. He is a senior member of the Institute of Electrical and Electronics Engineers (IEEE) since 2011, and he was elected as a fellow of the Human Factor and Ergonomics Society in 2020. Since 2021 he holds the Celia and Marcos Maus Chair for Data Sciences at Tel Aviv University.

== Selected articles ==
- Ben-Asher, N., & Meyer, J. (2018). The Triad of Risk-related Behavior (TriRB): A three-dimensional model of cyber-risk taking. Human Factors, 60(8), 1163–1178.
- Bereby-Meyer, Y., Meyer, J., & Flascher, O. (2002). Prospect Theory analysis of guessing in multiple choice tests. Journal of Behavioral Decision Making, 15, 313–327.
- Botzer, A., Meyer, J., Bak, P., & Parmet, Y. (2010). Cue threshold settings for binary categorization decisions. Journal of Experimental Psychology: Applied, 16, 1–15.
- Douer, N., & Meyer, J. (2020). The Responsibility Quantification (ResQu) model of human in-teraction with automation. IEEE Transactions on Automation Science and Engineering, 17 (2), 1044–1060.
- Douer, N., & Meyer, J. (2021). Theoretical, Measured and Subjective Responsibility in Aided Decision Making. ACM Transactions on Intelligent Interactive Systems, 11(1), Article 5
- Meyer, J. (2004). Conceptual issues in the study of dynamic hazard warnings. Human Factors, 46, 196–204.
- Meyer, J., & Bitan, Y. (2002). Why better operators receive worse warnings. Human Factors, 44, 343–354.
- Meyer, J., Dembinsky, O., & Raviv, T. (2020). Alerting about possible risks vs. blocking risky choices: A quantitative model and its empirical evaluation. Computers and Security, 97, 101944.
- Meyer, J., & Sheridan, T. B. (2017). The intricacies of user adjustment of system properties. Human Factors, 59 (6), 901–910.
- Meyer, J., Shinar, D., & Leiser, D. (1997). Multiple factors that determine performance with tables and graphs. Human Factors, 39, 268–286.
- Oron-Gilad, T., Meyer, J., & Gopher, D. (2002). Monitoring dynamic processes with alphanu-meric and graphic displays. Theoretical Issues in Ergonomic Sciences, 2, 368–389.
