= Aumer =

Aumer is a surname. Notable people with the surname include:

- Hermann Aumer (April 30, 1915 – May 30, 1955), German politician (BP)
- Jean-Louis Aumer, French danseur and choreographer
- Katherine Aumer (formerly Katherine Aumer-Ryan, born 1981), American social psychologist
- Peter Aumer (born 17 April 1976), German politician (CDU)
