= Anthony Andre =

American academic

- Education: University of Illinois Urbana-Champaign (BS, 1987; PhD, 1991)
- Known for: Behavioral approach to ergonomics Cockpit interface & display compatibility research Co-founder of the SJSU HF/E Graduate Program
- Awards: HFES Elected Fellow; IEA Elected Fellow; SJSU Davidson College of Engineering Outstanding Lecturer of the Year

Anthony D. Andre is a researcher, practitioner, and academic in the fields of human factors, ergonomics, usability and product design. He is the founding principal of Interface Analysis Associates, an international human factors and ergonomics consultancy. Andre pioneered the behavioral approach to ergonomics which included behavior modification and computer skill development as its basis, in direct opposition to common product-based approaches. He is a founding member and adjunct professor of the HF/E Graduate Program at San Jose State University. He founded the International Conference on Human Factors and Ergonomics in Health Care, co-created the Ergo-X conference, managed the ergonomic content for several of the annual California Association of Rehabilitation and Re-employment Professionals (CARRP) conferences, and recently produced, hosted, and presented a COVID-19 ergonomics virtual summit on how to work/school from home more safely and comfortably. He has served as president of the Human Factors and Ergonomics Society. Andre is a Certified Professional Ergonomist (CPE), recognized by the Board of Certification of Professional Ergonomists (BCPE).

== Early life and education ==
In 1987, Andre received a Bachelor of Science in Experimental and Cognitive Psychology from the University of Illinois at Urbana-Champaign. In 1991, he received a Ph.D. in Human Factors and Ergonomics (emphasis in Engineering Psychology), also from University of Illinois at Urbana-Champaign.

== Career ==
Andre worked at NASA Ames Research Center in Mountain View, CA, as a principal scientist and senior design researcher from 1992 until 1996. He studied interfaces for aircraft cockpits and air traffic management systems.

In 1993, Andre founded Interface Analysis Associates (IAA), a human factors, usability & ergonomics consulting firm. This company operated a usability testing lab in the San Francisco Bay Area. Currently located in Saratoga, CA, IAA has evaluated, designed, or tested more than 1000 products for over 400 clients in a variety of domains. One of these products was an automatic external defibrillator, and in 2009, IAA received the User-Centered Design Award, given by HFES's Product Design Technical Group, for their role in this design. In 2007, IAA's design of a bio-tech software application was voted the Best New Life Science Product in 2007.

Andre became a professor at San Jose State University in 1993, and co-founded the university's Human Factors and Ergonomics Graduate Program. He taught graduate courses over a period of 19 years, including Introduction to Ergonomics, Human Factors Experiments, Usability Evaluation and Testing, Cognitive Engineering, Engineering Psychology and an HF/E Professional Seminar. Andre also serves as a project and thesis advisor, on the graduate program committee and as the advisor of the SJSU Student Chapter of HFES. In 2009, Andre was named Outstanding Lecturer by the Davidson College of Engineering, San Jose State University.

Andre joined the Human Factors and Ergonomics Society in 1989, and has held leadership positions, including serving as president in 2010-2011. In 2012, he initiated and chaired the 2012 HFES Symposium on Human Factors and Ergonomics in Health Care.

Andre has been frequently interviewed in news reports about high tech product design.

== Legal work ==
Andre also serves as a human factors and ergonomics expert witness on various cases around the country. His legal engagements have covered issues such as product liability, healthcare adverse events, traffic accidents, aviation accidents, maritime accidents, workplace injuries and return to work assessments, trips and falls, and signage/ warnings.

== Honors and awards ==
- 2020- Volunteer of the Month (April), Human Factors and Ergonomics Society
- 2019- Arnold M. Small President's Distinguished Service Award, Human Factors and Ergonomics Society. This award recognizes individuals whose career-long contributions have brought honor to the profession and the society.
- 2018- Keith Hansen Professional Outreach Award, Human Factors and Ergonomics Society
- 2016- Inaugural Award Winner, Ergonomist Practitioner of the Year, Presented by the Foundation for Professional Ergonomics
- 2012- Elected Fellow of the Human Factors and Ergonomics Society
- 2010-2012- Elected President, Human Factors and Ergonomics Society
- 2009- Winner of the 2009 User-Centered Design Award for the design of the Cardiac Science G3 Plus AED, Human Factors and Ergonomics Society (HFES)
- 2009- 2009 Outstanding Lecturer of the Year, Davidson College of Engineering, San Jose State University
- 2008- Certified Professional Ergonomist, Board of Certification in Professional Ergonomics (BCPE)
- 2008- Marquis Who's Who in America 2009
- 2008- Winner, Best New Life Science Product Award, Scientist's Choice Awards 2008 (for StepOneÔ Real-Time PCR System).
- 2006- Winner, Best Ergonomics in Design Article Award, for the article, "Better Taxiway Surface Markings, Safer Airports."
- 2006- NASA Space Act Software Award for T-NASA (ARC-15246-1)
- 2006- NASA Group Achievement Award, System Level Integrated Concept (SLIC) Development Team
- 2000- "Best of Track" award (Air Traffic Management Track) for paper presented at the 19th AIAA/IEEE Digital Avionics Systems Conference, (Hooey, Foyle, Andre, and Parke, 2000).
- 1999- SAE Wright Brothers Memorial Award for "An Evaluation of the Taxiway Navigation and Situation Awareness (T-NASA) System in High-Fidelity Simulation," (SAE Paper No. 985541). This award is given to 'the best paper relating to the invention, development, design, construction or operation of an aircraft and/or spacecraft."
- 1998- National Aviation and Space Agency (NASA) Group Achievement Award, Low-Visibility Landing and Surface Operations Flight Validation Team; "For significantly impacting the safety and efficiency of airport surface operations in all-weather conditions through the development, integration, and demonstration of key navigation and situation awareness technologies."
- 1996- Industrial Designers Society of America (IDSA) Gold Award for "A Human Factors Analysis of Wayfinding at Tampa International Airport"
- 1996- First Recipient of the Earl Alluisi Award for Early Career Achievement, American Psychological Association (APA), Division 21 of Applied Experimental and Engineering Psychology
- 1990- California Department of Motor Vehicles Research Fellowship
- 1990, 1991- Society for Information Display (SID) Research Presentation Travel Award
- 1990- Transportation Research Board (TRB) and Federal Aviation Administration (FAA) National Graduate Aviation Research Award
