= Reviews of Human Factors and Ergonomics =

- Discipline: Ergonomics
- Language: English

Publication details
- History: 2005-present
- Publisher: SAGE Publications on behalf of the Human Factors and Ergonomics Society
- Frequency: Annually

Standard abbreviations
- ISO 4: Rev. Hum. Factors Ergon.

Indexing
- ISSN: 1557-234X (print); 2163-3134 (web)
- LCCN: 2007206177
- OCLC no.: 2007206177

Links
- Journal homepage; Online access; Online archive

Reviews of Human Factors and Ergonomics is a quarterly peer-reviewed academic journal that covers research in the field of Ergonomics. It was established in 2005 and is published by SAGE Publications on behalf of the Human Factors and Ergonomics Society. It is abstracted and indexed in Scopus.
