= Double dip =

Double dip or double dipping may refer to:

== Food ==
- Chips and dip § Double-dipping, biting a chip and then re-dipping it into a dip
- Double Dip (confectionery), flavored powders with an edible stick to dip into them

== Economics ==
- Double-dipping, the practice of releasing multiple special editions of a media product to consumers or of being illegitimately compensated a second time for the same activity
- Double-dip recession, a recession shape used by economists

== Other ==
- Double Dip, a "lifeline" in the Who Wants to Be a Millionaire? franchise in which a contestant takes two tries at a question. If the contestant's first answer is wrong, he or she must choose from the remaining three answers, but if the second answer is also wrong, the contestant's game is over and leaves with their winnings from the last milestone question (if used before the first milestone and both answers are wrong, they leave with nothing).
- Double dip (roller coaster element), a downward portion of a "hill" which is divided into two separate drops
- CO_{2}-type ("double-dip"), a type of trans-Neptunian object based on their spectra
- Double dipping, metaphor for circular analysis in statistics
- Double dipping (in US political commentary) or dual mandate, an elected official holding more than one elected or public position concurrently
- Double dipping, a hybrid open-access model used by journals to receive payments for guaranteeing open access of an article while also charging readers for accessing it

== See also ==
- "Second Bite of the Apple"
- Three Bites of the Apple
- Double Dipper the seventh episode of Gravity Falls
