= Mica Endsley =

Former Chief Scientist of the U.S. Air Force

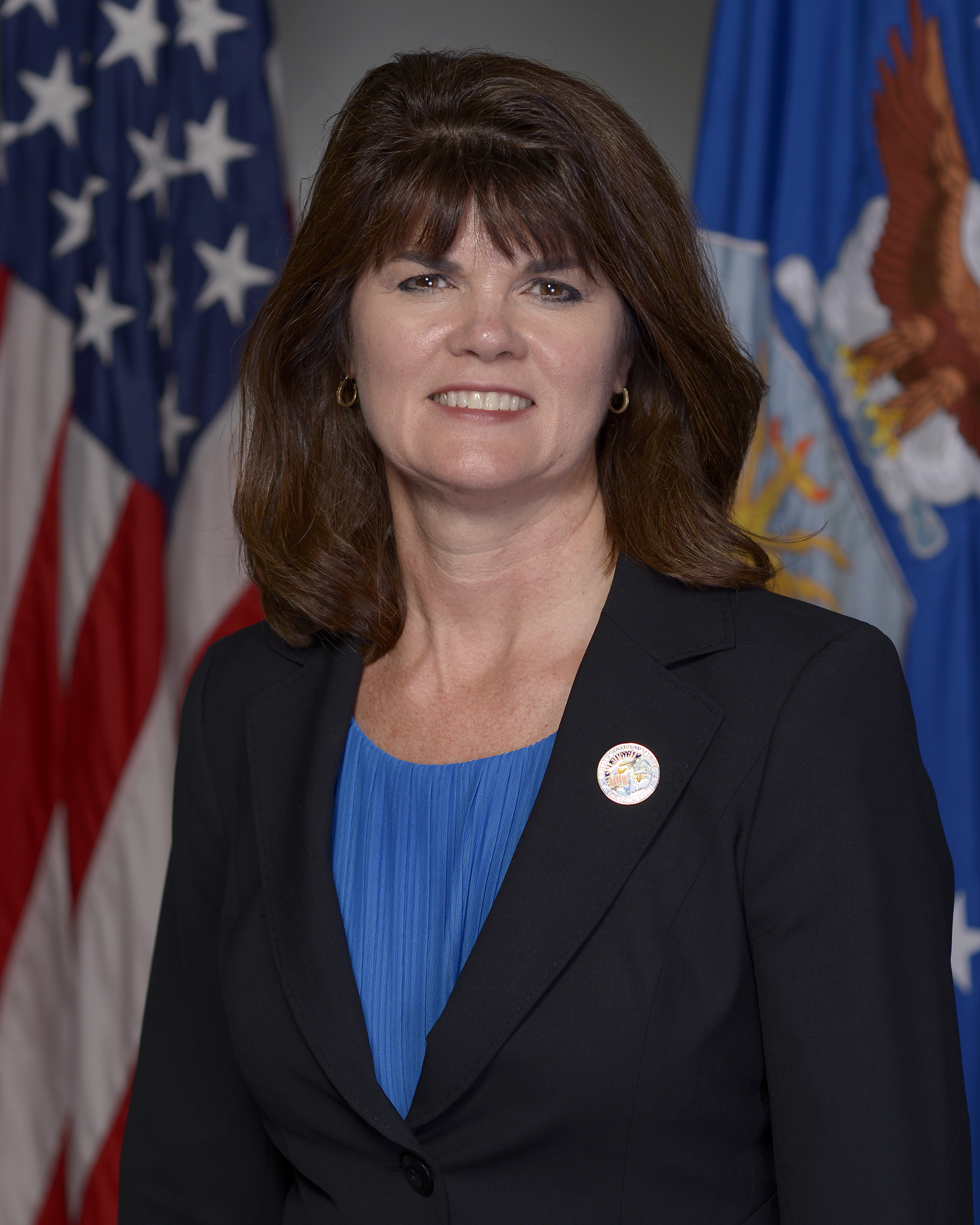
- Former Chief Scientist of the U.S. Air Force
- Born: California, US
- Education: Texas Tech University; Purdue University; University of Southern California
- Scientific career
- Fields: Engineering, Situation awareness
- Workplaces: United States Air Force, SA Technologies, Human Factors and Ergonomics Society, Journal of Cognitive Engineering and Decision Making

Mica Endsley is an American engineer and a former Chief Scientist of the United States Air Force.

== Early life and education ==
Endsley was born in California and grew up in Phoenix, Arizona, and Houston, Texas, where she attended Spring Woods High School. In 1982, Endsley graduated cum laude from Texas Tech University in Lubbock, Texas with Bachelor of Science degree in Industrial Engineering. In 1985, she earned a Master of Science degree in industrial engineering from Purdue University and earned a Doctor of Philosophy in industrial and systems engineering from the University of Southern California in 1990.

== Career ==
The position of the Chief Scientist was created over 60 years ago to provide independent scientific advice to the Secretary of the Air Force and the Air Force Chief of Staff, as well as to its senior leadership. In this role, she worked with the top scientists and engineers within the Air Force as well as in academia, industry, and the other armed services to ensure that the Air Force's research and development efforts remain relevant and effective. As the Chief Scientist, she responded to any tasking from the Secretary of the Air Force and the Air Force Chief of Staff on issues or opportunities of a scientific and technical nature that may arise. Endsley was the first human factors engineer and the first female to serve as Chief Scientist.

From 1997 to 2013, Endsley served as president and CEO of SA Technologies in Marietta, Georgia, a cognitive engineering firm specializing in the development of operator interfaces for advanced systems, including the next generation of systems for aviation, air traffic control, medica], power, oil & gas, and military operations. Prior to forming SA Technologies, she was a visiting associate professor at MIT in the Department of Aeronautics and Astronautics and associate professor of industrial engineering at Texas Tech University.

Endsley has authored over 200 scientific articles and reports on situation awareness, decision making and automation. In addition, Endsley has developed training programs for enhancing situation awareness among individuals and teams. She is co-author of two books, Analysis and Measurement of Situation Awareness and Designing for Situation Awareness.

She is past-president of the Human Factors and Ergonomics Society where she is a fellow, was co-founder of the Cognitive Engineering and Decision Making Technical Group of HFES, and has previously served on its executive council. Endsley has received numerous awards for teaching and research, is a Certified Professional Ergonomist and a Registered Professional Engineer. She is the founder and former Editor-in-Chief of the Journal of Cognitive Engineering and Decision Making and serves on the editorial board for three major journals. Endsley received the Human Factors and Ergonomics Society Jack Kraft Innovator Award in 2003 for her work in situation awareness.

== Selected publications ==
- Endsley, M. R. (1995). Toward a theory of situation awareness in dynamic systems. Human Factors, 37(1), 32-64.
- Endsley, M. R. (1995). Measurement of situation awareness in dynamic systems. Human Factors, 37(1), 65-84.
- Endsley, M. R., & Garland, D. J. (Eds.). (2000). Situation awareness analysis and measurement. Mahwah, NJ: Lawrence Erlbaum.
- Endsley, M. R., & Jones, W. M. (2001). A model of inter- and intrateam situation awareness: Implications for design, training and measurement. In M. McNeese, E. Salas & M. Endsley (Eds.), New trends in cooperative activities: Understanding system dynamics in complex environments (pp. 46–67). Santa Monica, CA: Human Factors and Ergonomics Society.
- Endsley, M. R. (2006). Expertise and Situation Awareness. In K. A. Ericsson, N. Charness, P. J. Feltovich & R. R. Hoffman (Eds.), The Cambridge Handbook of Expertise and Expert Performance (pp. 633–651). New York: Cambridge University Press.
- Endsley, M. R., & Jones, D. G. (2012). Designing for situation awareness: An approach to human-centered design (2nd ed.). London: Taylor & Francis.
