= Board of Certification in Professional Ergonomics =

US professional certifying body

The Board of Certification in Professional Ergonomics (BCPE) was established in 1990 in Bellingham, Washington as an independent nonprofit organization, and is the certifying body for individuals whose education and experience indicate broad expertise in the practice of human factors/ergonomics. To date, over 1,000 professionals have successfully met BCPE's certification criteria and been awarded one of the following distinguished credentials: Certified Professional Ergonomist (CPE), Certified Human Factors Professional (CHFP), Certified User Experience Professional (CUXP), Associate Ergonomics Professional (AEP), Associate Human Factors Professional (AHFP), or Associate User Experience Professional (AUXP).

The BCPE also adheres to the criteria and policies for competency assessment set by the National Commission for Certifying Agencies Accreditation (NCCA), which is the accrediting body of the Institute for Credentialing Excellence (ICE), and has been endorsed by the International Ergonomics Association (IEA), as an accredited ergonomics certifying body.

== History of BCPE ==
The BCPE was incorporated as an independent, nonprofit organization in July 1990. The development of ergonomics certification, however, dates back to the mid-1980s when committees of the Human Factors and Ergonomics Society (HFES), the International Ergonomics Association (IEA), the United States Department of Defense (DoD), NATO, and the National Academy of Sciences (NAS)/National Research Council (NRC) performed several reviews of job/task analyses to identify the knowledge, skills, and abilities required of human factors/ergonomics practitioners. These domains were later categorized by the Ergonomics Abstracts schema and evaluated for validity and reliability against the most widely used textbooks and handbooks in human factors/ergonomics degree programs.

The BCPE used these earlier job/task analyses to develop the criteria and procedures for BCPE certification, and initiated certification for the Certified Professional Ergonomist (CPE) and Certified Human Factors Professional (CHFP) credentials in 1992. Credentialing for Associate Ergonomics Professionals (AEP) and Associate Human Factors Professionals (AHFP) followed in 1995, and in 1998, certification as a Certified Ergonomics Associate (CEA) was established, in recognition of the expanding scope at which ergonomics is being practiced. In 2009 the Certified User Experience Professional credential was added.

In 2013, the base educational requirement was changed from a master's degree to a bachelor's degree, but the educational coverage of the core competencies in credit units remained equivalent to a master's degree. Applications for CEA were no longer accepted. The BCPE utilized these earlier job/task analyses reviews to develop the criteria and procedures for BCPE certification, and in 1992, initiated certification for the Certified Professional Ergonomist (CPE) and Certified Human Factors Professional (CHFP) credentials. Credentialing for Associate Ergonomics Professionals (AEP) and Associate Human Factors Professionals (AHFP) followed in 1995.

== BCPE Governance ==
The BCPE is governed by an elected board of directors, composed of BCPE certified professionals and a public member, who establish corporate policies and procedures. These volunteers are leaders from within the profession and represent the diverse domains in which HFE is practiced. Each director is nominated for election by a Nominations Committee and is elected by the Board to a term of three years. Corporate officers (President, Vice President, Secretary, and Treasurer) are elected annually by the Board from among the directors.

In addition, the BCPE is managed by an executive director and Executive Administrator who oversee administration of BCPE's certification program by implementing and abiding by established policies and procedures.

The BCPE adheres to bylaws, which define BCPE's primary objectives and describe how BCPE functions. BCPE's bylaws were first adopted on September 2, 1991, and are consistent with the current practices and legal requirements of Washington State, BCPE's state of incorporation. Subsequent revision of these bylaws has occurred as needed by amendment and is noted at the end of the document.

== Certification ==
Certification is a voluntary process, which validates an individual's qualifications in a specific field of professional practice. It demonstrates to employers, clients, and peers the individual's knowledge and experience and signifies his or her commitment to continued excellence in professional practice. In addition, it increases visibility, builds credibility, and validates expertise with those outside the profession.

== Certification Eligibility ==
Education: • A bachelor's degree is required from an accredited* school; all majors are accepted. • Academic coursework is required across specific categories, amounting to a minimum of 24 credit hours in total. The application forms provide the basic framework of the coursework topics with the associated credit hours expected. Below is the education coursework requirement in detail.

Experience and Work Products:

A minimum of 3 years, full-time equivalent experience working in the profession is required. Full-time equivalent provides for those who might have part-time employment to build up experience. In addition to full-time employment in an ergonomics-related field, examples of acceptable work experiences also includes:

- Field placement requirements in Human Factors/Ergonomics, such as, internships and coop work experiences during academic programs, can be included towards work experience.
- A paid research assistant or teacher's assistant position relevant to Human Factors/Ergonomics can be considered as work experience.
- One year of work experience equivalency is granted to graduates of a Human Factors/Ergonomics PhD program, verified by a submitted transcript.

Work products are required to demonstrate your proficiency working in the profession. These work products should reflect your knowledge and skill of the field and have been predominantly your work. Completion of at least two of the work products must have occurred in the past five years. The remaining work products must have been completed in the past 10 years.

Sample work products may include, for example, relevant segments of technical reports, design papers, analysis reports, evaluation reports, patent applications, or articles authored by you in ergonomics/human factors/user experience publications. Work examples that are part of independent work, such as a Master's thesis or Doctoral dissertation are acceptable. Varied work products are encouraged to demonstrate your proficiency.

If necessary, for context, annotate your work product or provide additional information to complement any of your products. Your work product submission should indicate your thought processes and methods you applied in performing the work. Be sure to attach the additional information to the appropriate work product and include the heading, “[‘Your last name] Work Product Title” and the “work product number” you listed in the application.

Work performed for the government or industry is often proprietary or confidential. All BCPE staff and volunteers involved with applications, examinations or personal information of other certificants, sign non-disclosure and confidentiality agreements.

Applicants are also welcome to edit their products and redact sensitive information. The HF/E component of the work being reviewed can usually be independent of knowing the brand or name of the system or device of the project.

== Certification Requirement ==
Professional (CPE, CHFP, CUXP)

1. Bachelor's degree and academic coursework covering BCPE core competencies*
2. Minimum of three years (full-time equivalent) HFE work experience
3. Passing score on the professional certification exam

Associate (AEP, AHFP, AUXP)

1. Bachelor's degree and academic coursework covering BCPE core competencies*
2. Less than three years HFE experience
3. Lacking work products required for professional certification

Associate certification is a voluntary, temporary step towards professional certification. It is awarded when the educational requirements are met. An application for Associate certification must be submitted, it is not automatically awarded. Associate certification may be held for only 6 years during which the certificant is expected to apply for professional certification. Usually, individuals applying for Associate certification need more time to fulfill the 3-year work experience requirement.

- Graduates of a Human Factors and Ergonomics Society accredited graduate program complete a shortened application form.

Note: 24 credit hours of relevant academic coursework is required.

CEA: BCPE is no longer accepting applications for Certified Ergonomics Associate (CEA) certification.

== The Written Examination ==
Sitting for the Exam: There is one examination for Professional certification, regardless of desired designation. The exam consists of 125 multiple-choice questions and takes approximately 3 hours to complete. It is administered electronically within a two-month window, twice a year at proctored sites across the country as well as internationally. Exception to these deadlines are not possible due to the time needed to process and evaluate each application.

== Preparation for the Examination ==
The BCPE does not review, sponsor or endorse any preparation materials or review courses for the certification examination. Separation from courses is a best practice for certification bodies to be sure there is no conflict of interest. The BCPE Exam Specification document outlines the exam content.

== Exam Dates and Sites ==
The written examination is offered a number of times throughout the year at varying sites across the country, usually in conjunction with related ergonomics conferences.

== Media Policy ==
The BCPE operates social media pages for the purpose of communication and outreach with certificants and potential future certificants; discussion of relevant topics in the human factors/ergonomics/user experience fields; notification of upcoming industry events and other business purposes as directed solely by the BCPE. The BCPE has granted permission for use of BCPE copyrighted materials and the BCPE logo for this Wikipedia page.
