= Journal of Cognitive Engineering and Decision Making =

- Discipline: Psychology, cognitive engineering
- Language: English
- Edited by: Jan Maarten Schraagen

Publication details
- History: 2007-present
- Publisher: SAGE Publications
- Frequency: Quarterly

Standard abbreviations
- ISO 4: J. Cogn. Eng. Decis. Mak.

Indexing
- ISSN: 1555-3434
- LCCN: 2005212219
- OCLC no.: 166882353

Links
- Journal homepage; Online access; Online archive

The Journal of Cognitive Engineering and Decision Making is a quarterly peer-reviewed academic journal that covers research on human cognition and the application of this to the design and development of system interfaces and automation. Its editor-in-chief is Jan Maarten Schraagen (TNO and University of Twente). It was established in 2007 and is currently published by SAGE Publications in association with the Human Factors and Ergonomics Society.

== Abstracting and indexing ==
The Journal of Cognitive Engineering and Decision Making is abstracted and indexed in:

- Ergonomics Abstracts
- Transportation Research Information Services
- TRIS Electronic Bibliographic Data Base

== Related journals ==
- Ergonomics in Design
- Human Factors
- Proceedings of the Human Factors and Ergonomics Society Annual Meeting
- Proceedings of the International Symposium on Human Factors and Ergonomics in Health Care
