= Peter Hancock (professor) =

British-American scientist and author

Professor Peter Adrian Hancock
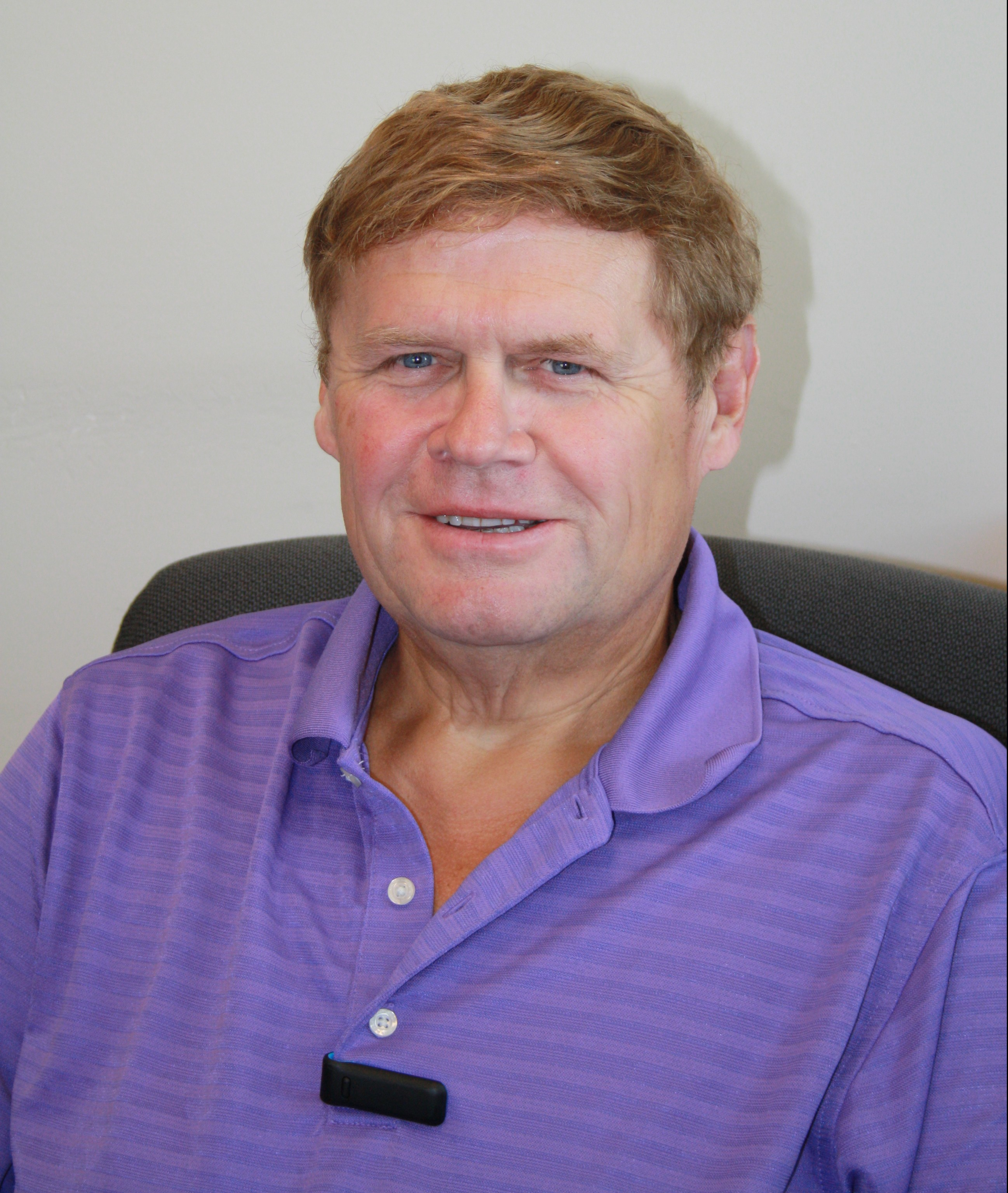
- Born: March 9, 1953 (age 73)
- Citizenship: United States
- Education: Loughborough University, University of Illinois at Urbana–Champaign
- Scientific career
- Fields: Human factors and ergonomics
- Thesis: An Endogenous Metric for the Perception of Short Temporal Intervals (1983)
- Doctoral advisor: Karl M. Newell
- Website: peterhancock.ucf.edu

Peter Adrian Hancock (born March 9, 1953) is a British-American scientist of human factors and ergonomics, author, and expert witness. He is a Provost Distinguished Research Professor in the Department of Psychology and the Institute for Simulation and Training, as well as the Department of Civil and Environmental Engineering and the Department of Industrial Engineering and Management Systems at the University of Central Florida. He is the research director of the Minds in Technology−Machines in Thought research laboratory at the University of Central Florida.

== Life ==
Hancock studied human anatomy and biology at Loughborough University in the United Kingdom. In 1983, he received a Ph.D. in human performance from the University of Illinois at Urbana–Champaign, and was subsequently awarded a Doctor of Science degree in human-machine systems by Loughborough U. in 2001. Prior to his appointment at the University of Central Florida, he worked as an assistant professor at the University of Southern California, a research scientist at the National Institute for Occupational Safety and Health, an associate professor (promoted to full professor in 1996) at the University of Minnesota, as a research affiliate for the University of Hawaii at Manoa, as deputy director for the Liberty Mutual Research Center for Safety/Health, a research affiliate for the Massachusetts Institute of Technology, and a visiting professor at the Ben-Gurion University of the Negev.

== Awards and honours ==
- Early Career Distinguished Scholar, North American Society for the Psychology of Sport and Physical Activity (1987)
- Best Ergonomics in Design Article Award, Human Factors Society (1994)
- Sir Frederic Bartlett Medal, The Chartered Institute of Ergonomics and Human Factors (2000)
- Franklin V. Taylor Award, American Psychological Association (2001)
- Liberty Mutual Prize in Occupational Safety and Ergonomics, International Ergonomics Association (2001)
- Jerome H. Ely Award, Human Factors and Ergonomics Society (2001)
- Medal of WB Jastrzębowski, Polish Ergonomics Society (2002)
- Liberty Mutual Medal in Occupational Safety and Ergonomics, International Ergonomics Association (2003)
- Jack A. Kraft Innovator Award, Human Factors and Ergonomics Society (2005)
- Norbert Wiener Award, Institute of Electrical and Electronics Engineers (2006)
- A.R. Lauer Safety Award, Human Factors and Ergonomics Society (2007)
- Otto Edholm Award, The Chartered Institute of Ergonomics and Human Factors (2008)
- Raymond F. Longacre Award, Aerospace Medical Association (2008)
- Paul M. Fitts Education Award, Human Factors and Ergonomics Society (2008)
- Andrew P. Sage Award, Institute of Electrical and Electronics Engineers (2008)
- Henry L. Taylor Award, Aerospace Medical Association (2011)
- Admiral Leland S. Kollmorgen Spirit of Innovation Award, Human Factors and Ergonomics Society Augmented Cognition Technical Group (2011)
- Oliver Keith Hansen Outreach Award, Human Factors and Ergonomics Society (2012)
- Alexander C. Williams Jr., Design Award, Human Factors and Ergonomics Society (2013)
- Charles S. Gersoni Military Psychology Award, American Psychological Association
- William Floyd Award, The Chartered Institute of Ergonomics and Human Factors (2015)
- IEA Ergonomics Development Award, International Ergonomics Association (2015)
- IEA/Elsevier John Wilson Award for Applied Ergonomics, International Ergonomics Association (Inaugural Award, Co-Winner; 2015)
- Sidney D. Leverett Jr. Environmental Science Award, Aerospace Medical Association (2016)
- Human Factors Prize Award Winner (with B.D. Sawyer), Human Factors and Ergonomics Society (2017)
- IEA Outstanding Educators Award, International Ergonomics Association (2018)

== Works ==
- Mind, Machine, and Morality (1st ed. 2009). ISBN 0-754-67358-8. (Nominated for the William James Award of the American Psychological Association and for the Ursula Gielen Book Award).
- Richard III and the Murder in the Tower (1st ed. 2009, paperback 2011). ISBN 0-752-45797-7. (Nominated for the Crime Writers Association Gold Dagger Award for Non-Fiction).
- Cognitive Differences in the Ways Men and Women Perceive the Dimensions and duration of Time: Contrasting Gaia and Chronos (1st ed. 2011). ISBN 0-773-41497-5.
- Hoax Springs Eternal: Thy Psychology of Cognitive Deception (1st ed. 2014). ISBN 1-107-41768-6
