= Paul B. Baltes Lecture =

Annual psychology lecture in Germany

The Paul B. Baltes lecture is held annually by the Berlin-Brandenburg Academy of Sciences and Humanities. The lectures commenced in 2008 and are named after Paul Baltes, the German developmental psychologist.

Each year the Academy selects a leading international scientist to present the lecture which commemorates Paul Baltes' achievements in psychological research and his contributions to psychology.

The Paul B. Baltes lecture is a joint initiative of the psychology institutes in Berlin and Potsdam (Freie Universität, Humboldt-Universität, Technische Universität, Universität Potsdam, Max Planck Institute for Human Development) and is supported by the Margret M. and Paul B. Baltes Foundation.

== The Lectures ==
- 2008 Michael Posner: "Executive Attention: Its Origins, Development, and Functions"
- 2009 Lynn Hasher: "Age-Related Consequences of Attention Regulation and Dysregulation"
- 2010 John Nesselroade: "The Person-Oriented Perspective in Psychology"
- 2011 Andrew Meltzoff: "The Development of Social Cognition: Imitation, Cultural Stereotypes and Identity Formation in Children"
- 2012 Jutta Heckhausen: "A Motivational Theory of Life-Span Development"
- 2013 Wendy Rogers: "Human-Robot Interaction: Understanding the Potential of Robots for Older Adults"
- 2014 Brent W. Roberts: "Human Sociogenomics"
- 2015 Ray Dolan: "Circuits for Social Cognition"
- 2016 Diane Poulin-Dubois: "The Developmental Origins of Selective Trust"
- 2017 Kevin Warwick: "Neural Implants for Therapy and Enhancement"
- 2018 Denny Borsboom: "Network Approaches to Psychopathology"
- 2019 David Poeppel: "The Auditory System and the Motor System, in Time"
- 2020 Nora Newcombe: "Affordances and Representations: Understanding Mental Rotation, Perspective Taking and Spatial Reorientation"
- 2021 Peter Hancock: "Time to Think of Time"
- 2022 Stephan Lewandowsky: "Demagoguery, Technology, and Cognition: Addressing the Threats to Democracy"
- 2023 Alexandra M. Freund: "Motivation and Aging: The Role of Goals in Adult Development and Aging"
- 2024 Laura L. Carstensen: "Emotional Well-being and Age: The Role of Shifting Time Horizons"
- 2025 Matthias Kliegel: "Oh no! I forgot to ...' A Lifespan Perspective on the Interplay of Episodic Memory, Cognitive Control and Metacognition in Everyday Memory Failures"
- 2026 Martin Lövdén: "Learning in Older Age: A Lifespan Perspective"
