= Ba no kuuki wo yomu =

Japanese term similar to "reading the room"

In Japanese culture, “Ba no Kuuki wo Yomu” (場の空気を読む) is a phrase that can be translated as “understanding the situation without words” or “sensing someone’s feelings”. The literal meaning is “reading air”. It can be understood as situation awareness in the Japanese context.

Sensing and practicing “Ba no Kuuki wo Yomu” is considered social manners or social intelligence in Japan. Unlike the individualistic and expressive cultures in Western countries, people in Japan are expected to think collectively, understand situations without need for explanation and behave based on their position accordingly. If one does not “read air” in business, he or she is not only unable to become a successful business person, but will also find it hard to function as an employee in an organization.

== See also ==
- read the room
- Kuukiyomi: Consider It, a series of games based on this concept.
- Abilene paradox
- Situation awareness
