= Jutta Heckhausen =

Professor of Psychological Science

- Citizenship: German
- Occupations: Psychology and Social Behavior Professor
- Awards: 1999 Max Planck Research Award for International Cooperation 2014 APA Baltes Distinguished Research Achievement Award 2020 Distinguished Career Contribution to Gerontology Award, Behavioral and Social Sciences Section, Gerontological Society of America

Academic background
- Education: PhD., University of Strathclyde, 1985 M.A., Ruhr-Universität Bochum, 1980 B.A., Ruhr-Universität Bochum, 1977

Signature
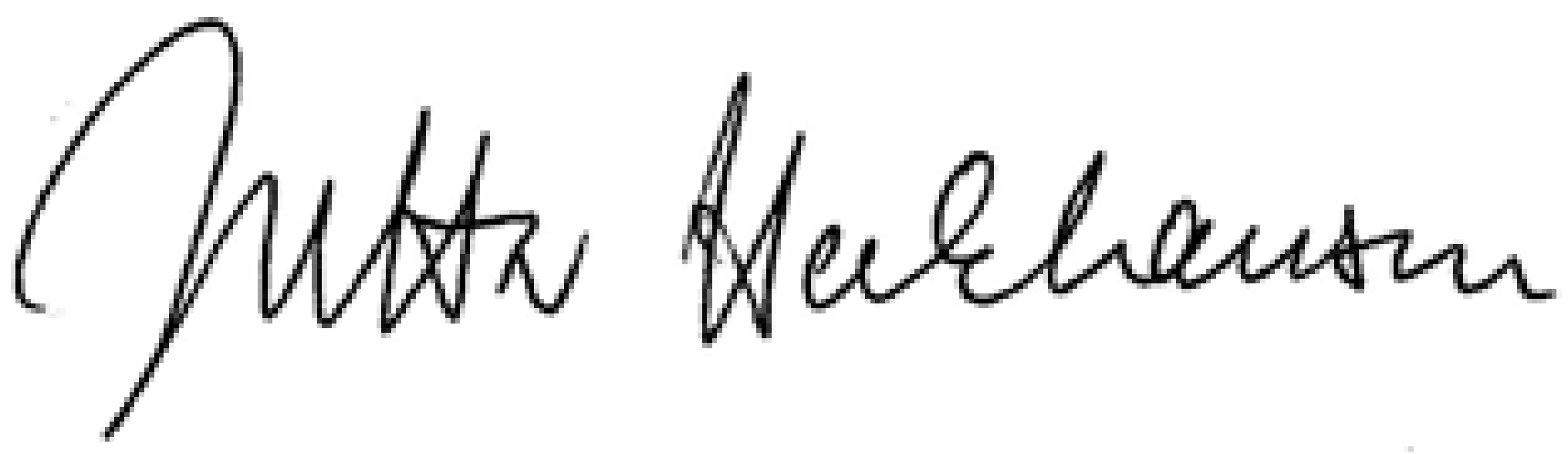

Jutta Heckhausen (born March 1957) is Professor of Psychological Science, University of California, Irvine. She specializes in life-span developmental psychology, motivation, individual agency and social context. She expanded her education at the Center for Social and Behavioral Science, Stanford University and at the Center for Interdisciplinary Research, University Bielefeld, Germany. At the Department of Psychological Science at University of California, Irvine, she teaches in the areas of life-span development and motivational psychology.

Heckhausen worked with Richard Schulz and formulated the life-span theory of control, their journal article was published in 1995 as A life-span theory of control. Further developments of their conceptual framework into a motivational theory of life-span development were published with co-author Carsten Wrosch in 2010 and 2019.

== Biography ==
Jutta Heckhausen is the daughter of German psychologist Heinz Heckhausen.^{de:Heinz Heckhausen} Heckhausen grew up in Münster/Westfalen and Bochum, Germany. She maintains her permanent residency in the United States.

Heckhausen earned both her Vordiplom (B.A.) in Psychology and Philosophy and Diplom in Psychology (M.A.) at Ruhr-Universität Bochum, Germany in 1977 and 1980, respectively. In the following years from 1981 to 1983, she completed her graduate studies and research on child development at the University of Strathclyde, Glasgow, Great Britain. Heckhausen earned two graduate scholarships between 1981 and 1984, the Graduate scholarship of the German Academic Exchange Service (1981 to 1983), as well as the Graduate scholarship of the Doctorate Program for Developmental Psychology funded by the Volkswagen-Foundation (1983-1984). She earned her Ph.D. in Psychology in 1985 at the University of Strathclyde where she studied development in infants through the joint-interactions with their mothers.

From 1984 through 1986, Heckhausen worked as a post-doctoral fellow at the Center for Life-Span Psychology at the Max-Planck-Institute for Human Development in Berlin. During these years, she taught undergraduate and graduate courses in developmental psychology, motivation, personality, and educational psychology at Technische Universität Berlin and Freie Universität Berlin. She worked as a research scientist from 1987 to 1996 and became a senior scientist with her own research group in 1996. This same year, she earned her Habilitation (Venia Legendi) in Psychology at Freie Universität Berlin, Germany. She was an associate member of the John D. and Catherine T. MacArthur Foundation Research Network on Successful Mid-Life Development from 1991 to 1998. Between these years, from 1995 to 1996 Heckhausen worked as a fellow at the Center for Advanced Study in the Behavioral Sciences at Stanford.

In December 2000, Heckhausen joined the University of California, Irvine as a professor of the Department of Psychology and Social Behavior. She established the research laboratory on Life-Span Development and Motivation. She was a part-time visiting professor at the Ruprecht-Karl University Heidelberg, Germany in 2013 and 2014. From 2015 to 2016, Heckhausen worked as a fellow at the Center for Interdisciplinary Research University of Bielefeld, Germany. She is currently a member of the Board of Trustees of the Leibniz Institute for Educational Trajectories in Bamberg, Germany.

She is a fellow of the Gerontological Society of America since 2011 and a fellow of the Association of Psychological Science since 2016.

== Awards ==
Heckhausen received the 1999 Max Planck Research Award for International Cooperation, and the 2014 Baltes Distinguished Research Achievement Award from the American Psychological Association. and the 2020 Distinguished Career Contribution to Gerontology Award, Behavioral and Social Sciences Section, Gerontological Society of America

In 2012 Heckhausen presented the Paul B. Baltes Lecture at the Berlin-Brandenburg Academy of Sciences and Humanities.

Awards Heckhausen received from the University of California, Irvine include the Teaching Excellence Award in 2005, Faculty Mentor of the Month for the Undergraduate Research Opportunity Program in May 2014, and the 2014 Chancellor's Award for Excellence in Fostering Undergraduate Research for her work with her undergraduate student Cynthia Sanchez.

== Research ==
Jutta Heckhausen's research revolves around motivational processes and their relation to the development of individuals as they transition through different stages and confront various challenges in their lives. Much of her current research, for example, addresses social mobility in the context of transitions from school to college to the workplace.

In 1999, Heckhausen published a monograph Developmental regulation in adulthood: Age-normative and sociostructural constraints as adaptive challenges, which comprises her work on the life-span theory of control and related empirical studies in the 1990s.

In 2008 and 2018, Heckhausen co-edited the second and third edition of the book Motivation and Action with Heinz Heckhausen (first edition published in German in 1980). The book includes an in-depth presentation of the history of motivation and presents new theories and research findings pertaining to motivation, implicit and explicit motives, volition, self-regulation, and their development. The book also discusses the role of motivation in school and college, work environment, and sports.

Heckhausen and her collaborator Richard Schulz, formulated the life-span theory of control and tested its premise and relation to developmental in adulthood. They co-authored the journal article A life-span theory of control in 1995. This theory is based on the concepts of primary control and secondary control. Primary control refers to behaviors directed at the external environment, involves individuals' attempts to change the environment to fit their needs, and has functional primacy over secondary control. Secondary control involves the internal environment of motivation, emotion, and cognition, which helps the individual cope with failure and direct the individual toward life goals using motivational resources and processes.

In the following year, Schulz and Heckhausen published the article A life span model of successful aging which discusses the development of the model in relation to conceptions of successful aging. The article proposes a key role of primary control for adaptive aging, and lays out processes of optimization which guide the selection of goals and the compensation of control loss.

Heckhausen co-authored A motivational theory of life-span development with Schulz and Carsten Wrosch in 2010. This article presents new developments of the theory, specifically the model of optimization in primary and secondary control and the action-phase model of developmental regulation. A set of 15 theoretical propositions based on these models are discussed and the relevant empirical evidence is reviewed.

In 2019, Heckhausen, Wrosch, and Schulz published an updated review of their theory and relevant empirical research in the Annual Review of Psychology. The article discusses individual agency in life-span development in terms of the pursuit of long-term goals and their action cycles from goal selection to goal engagement, disengagement and goal adjustment in anticipation of and response to life-course changes in the controllability of these goals. Empirical research shows that individual differences in the capacity to regulate own motivation and action throughout such long-term action cycles have consequences for people's development, life course, health, and well-being.

== Representative Publications ==
- Heckhausen, J. (1999). Developmental regulation in adulthood: Age-normative and sociostructural constraints as adaptive challenges. New York, NY: Cambridge University Press.
- Heckhausen, J., & Schulz, R. (1995). A life-span theory of control. Psychological Review, 102(2), 284–304. doi: 10.1037/0033-295X.102.2.284
- Heckhausen, J., Wrosch, C., & Schulz, R. (2010). A motivational theory of life-span development. Psychological Review, 117(1), 32. doi:10.1037/a0017668.
- Heckhausen, J., Wrosch, C., & Schulz, R. (2019). Agency and motivation in adulthood and old age. Annual Review of Psychology, 70, 191–217. doi.org/10.1146/annurev-psych-010418-103043
- Schulz, R., & Heckhausen, J. (1996). A life span model of successful aging. American Psychologist, 51(7), 702–714. doi:10.1037/0003-066X.51.7.702
