= Lynn Hasher =

Psychologist

- Occupation: Senior Scientist at the Rotman Research Institute
- Spouse: David Goldstein

Academic background
- Education: Smith College; University of California, Berkeley

Lynn Hasher is a cognitive scientist known for research on attention, working memory, and inhibitory control. Hasher is Professor Emerita in the Psychology Department at the University of Toronto and Senior Scientist at the Rotman Research Institute at Baycrest Centre for Geriatric Care.

Hasher received the 1995-1996 James Mckeen Cattell Fellowship from the Association for Psychological Science. She was awarded a John Simon Guggenheim Memorial Foundation Fellowship in 1986.

Hasher is one of the authors of Working Memory and Human Cognition (1996).

== Biography ==
Hasher received her Bachelor of Arts in psychology from Smith College. She received her Ph.D. in psychology from the University of California, Berkeley in 1970, under the supervision of Leo Postman. Hasher held faculty positions at Carleton University, Temple University, and Duke University. In 1999, Hasher joined the faculty of the University of Toronto and the Rotman Research Institute. While at the University of Toronto, she became a Fellow of Massey College. Hasher retired in December 2017.

Hasher is a Fellow of the Association for Psychological Science, the Psychonomic Society, and the Society of Experimental Psychologists. She is a member of the Memory Disorders Research Society. Her research has been funded by the National Institute on Aging, Canadian Institutes of Health Research, and Natural Sciences and Engineering Research Council.

She is married to David Goldstein, with whom she conducted research on the illusory truth effect. They have two children.

== Research ==
Hasher's research career has focused on basic attentional processes, including inhibitory control, the role of attention in understanding language and remembering events, and how control of attention changes with age. Many of her seminal studies on attention and working memory were conducted in collaboration with Rose Zacks.

Hasher's research team has explored circadian rhythms and the impact of sleep schedule on cognition and emotion. In a study exploring happiness in young adults and older adults, they found that older adults tended to report more positive emotions than younger adults, and were more likely to be morning-type people. Across groups, being a morning-type person was associated with higher rates of happiness. Another study asked how performance on tasks requiring attention varies in relation to the time of day. Using functional magnetic resonance imaging (FMRI), Hasher and her research team examined changes of neutral activity in the attention control network. Results showed that time of testing influenced task-related FMRI signals in older adults.

== Awards ==
In 2009 Hasher presented the Paul B. Baltes Lecture at the Berlin-Brandenburg Academy of Sciences and Humanities.

== Representative publications ==
- Hasher, L., Goldstein, D., & Toppino, T. (1977). Frequency and the conference of referential validity. Journal of Verbal Learning and Verbal Behavior, 16(1), 107–112.
- Hasher, L., Quig, M. B., & May, C. P. (1997). Inhibitory control over no-longer-relevant information: Adult age differences. Memory & Cognition, 25(3), 286–295.
- Hasher, L., Stoltzfus, E. R., Zacks, R. T., & Rypma, B. (1991). Age and inhibition. Journal of Experimental Psychology: Learning, Memory, and Cognition, 17(1), 163–169.
- Hasher, L., & Zacks, R. T. (1979). Automatic and effortful processes in memory. Journal of Experimental Psychology: General, 108(3), 356–388.
- Hasher, L., & Zacks, R. T. (1984). Automatic processing of fundamental information: the case of frequency of occurrence. American Psychologist, 39(12), 1372–1388.
