= David Shinar =

Israeli traffic safety researcher

- דוד שנער
- Born: October 8, 1943 (age 82); Jerusalem, Israel
- Education: Ph.D.
- Alma mater: Hebrew University of Jerusalem (undergraduate); Ohio State University (graduate)
- Occupations: Ergonomist, Traffic Safety and Human Behavior
- Spouse: Dr. Eva Shinar
- Children: 2
- Relatives: Pessah Shinar (father)

David Shinar (Hebrew: דוד שנער) is a traffic safety researcher and a professor emeritus at Ben-Gurion University of the Negev, Israel.

== Biography ==
David Shinar received his BA in psychology from the Hebrew University of Jerusalem in 1968, his MA in Experimental Psychology from Ohio State University in 1970 and his Ph.D. in Human Performance and Human Factors Engineering from Ohio State University in 1973. He was the George Shrut Professor of Human Performance Management at the Department of Industrial Engineering and Management at Ben-Gurion University of the Negev, Israel, till his retirement in 2012. Between 2007- 2010 he served as the Chief Scientist of Israel's National Road Safety Authority. He is a member of the United States' National Research Council Transportation research board (TRB) Committee on Simulation and Measurement of Vehicle and Operator Performance and is a member of the TRB coordinating committee of the Strategic Highway Research Program (SHRP2). He is an Honorary Fellow of the Human Factors and Ergonomics Society and a recipient of the A.R. Lauer Award for his "outstanding Contributions to Human Factors Aspects of Highway Traffic Safety". He is also the recipient of the Israeli Ergonomics Society award for his scientific contributions to ergonomics. David Shinar has served on the editorial advisory board of various journals including Accident Analysis and Prevention, Journal of Safety Research, Human Factors, Transportation Research F, Cognition Technology and Work, and International Journal of Heavy Vehicle Systems. His research has been sponsored by the U.S. Government, the European Commission, the Israeli government, public foundations, and private industry. He has given over 30 invited talks in international conferences, and has published over 150 articles and scientific reports including the book "Traffic Safety and Human Behavior". He has been teaching and doing research on driver behavior and highway safety for over 35 years, and has advised over 50 MSc and PhD students.

Research
Throughout his long academic career, David Shinar is well known for his pioneering work applying basic behavioral research toward traffic safety. David Shinar is a professor of Ergonomics, he founded the Center for Research in Ergonomics and Safety and established the first driving research simulation laboratory in Israel in the Department of Industrial Engineering and Management. He has directed research on driver information processing and human factors in crash causation for over 35 years and authored over 150 reports in this area. David's main interests are ergonomics aspects of traffic safety, in particular driver visual and perceptual skills in vision and perception. In this area he has studied headway perception and distance estimation, driver eye movements, and driver hazard detection. In addition he has studied the impact of these factors on young and old drivers, and drivers impaired by alcohol, drugs, and fatigue. More recently his research interests are geared towards vulnerable road users, especially bicyclists.

Personal Life
David Shinar was born on October 8, 1943, in Jerusalem, Israel. He spent a part of his teenage years in Philadelphia, PA. His father, Pessah Shinar, now a professor emeritus of the Hebrew University of Jerusalem, the Asia and Africa institute, is a co-author of a well known Hebrew-Arabic dictionary, and his mother is a retired laboratory technician. David Shinar received his B.A. in Psychology from the Hebrew University in Jerusalem where he was also a research assistant of the Nobel prize recipient Daniel Kahneman. In 1969 David Shinar left Israel to study Human Engineering in the USA at Ohio State University and completed his Ph.D. in 1973. He proceeded to study traffic accidents at a research institute in Indiana University. Upon his return to Israel in 1977, David Shinar joined Ben-Gurion University of the Negev, where he founded the Driving Behaviour Laboratory and created the Graduate program in Human Factors Engineering and later in Highway Traffic Safety. David Shinar is married to Dr. Eva Shinar, a clinical psychologist, and has two children.

Awards
1996 Human Factors and Ergonomics Society, A.R. Lauer Award for "Outstanding Contributions to Human Factors Aspects of Highway Traffic Safety"
Since 2001 Incumbent of the George Shrut Chair in Human Performance Management
Since 2006 Fellow (honorary) of the Human Factors and Ergonomics Society
2008 Honoree of the special "Meet the Author" Session at the Transportation Research Board Annual Conference for the book "Traffic Safety and Human Behavior'".
2010 Israeli Ergonomics Society first Annual Award for “Unique Contributions towards the Advancement and Development of Human Factors in Ergonomics"
2011 Faculty of Engineering, Ben-Gurion University Award for "Unique Contributions to the Faculty of Engineering."

Books
Shinar, D. (1978) Psychology on the road: The human factor in traffic safety. New York: John Wiley & Sons
Shinar, D. (2007) Traffic safety and human behavior. Oxford, England: Elsevier

Highly cited articles
Treat, J. R., Tumbas, N. S., McDonald, S. T., Shinar, D., & Hume, R. D. (1979). TRI-LEVEL STUDY OF THE CAUSES OF TRAFFIC ACCIDENTS. EXECUTIVE SUMMARY (No. DOTHS034353579TAC (5) Final Rpt).
Shinar, D., & Schieber, F. (1991). Visual requirements for safety and mobility of older drivers. Human Factors: The Journal of the Human Factors and Ergonomics Society, 33(5), 507-519.
Shinar, D. (1998). Aggressive driving: the contribution of the drivers and the situation. Transportation Research Part F: traffic psychology and behaviour, 1(2), 137-160.
Shinar, D., & Compton, R. (2004). Aggressive driving: an observational study of driver, vehicle, and situational variables. Accident analysis & prevention, 36(3), 429-437.
