= Katherine Aumer =

American social psychologist

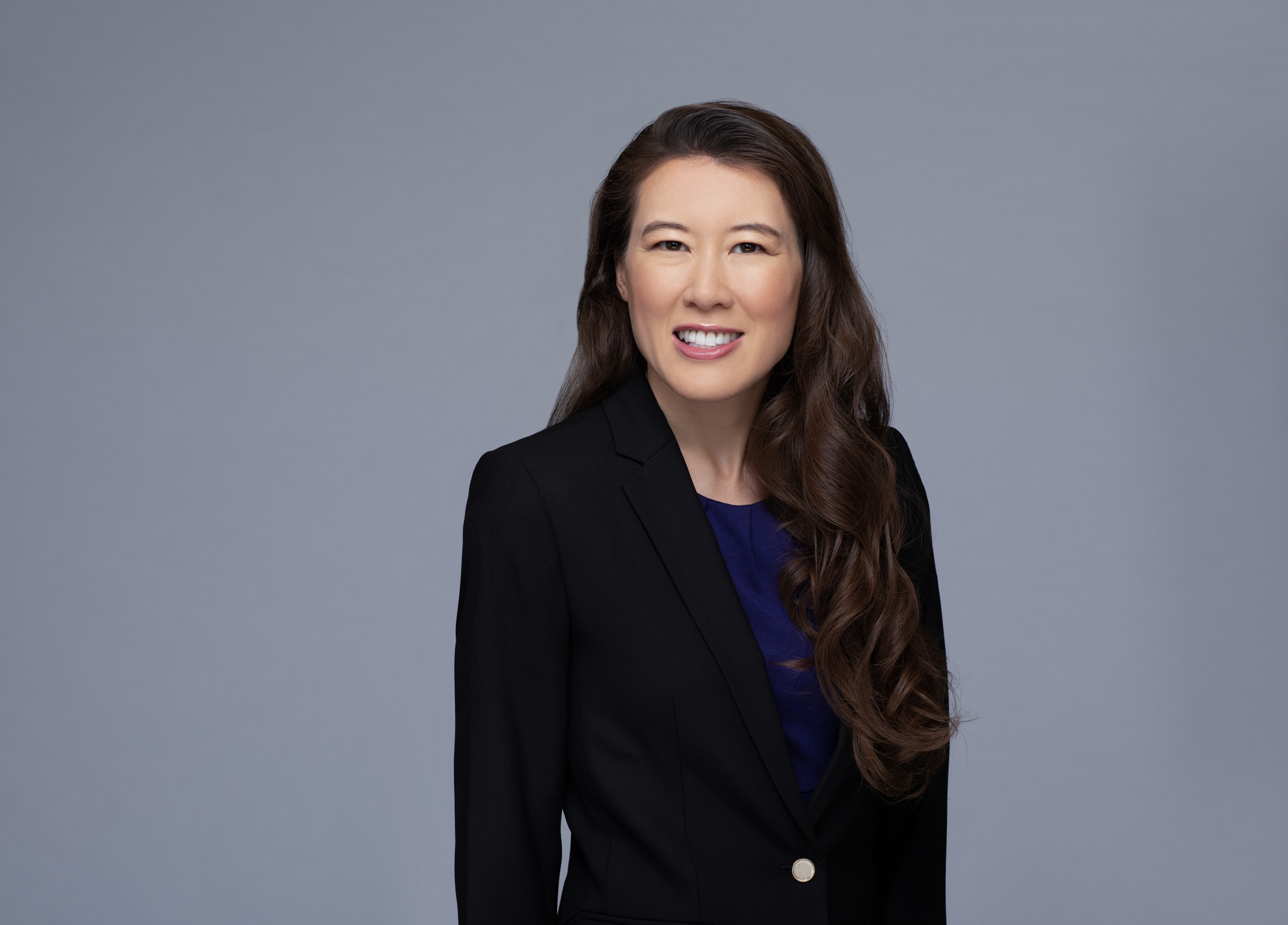
- Born: 1981 (age 43–44)
- Education: University of Iowa; University of Texas at Austin
- Occupation: Social psychologist

Katherine Vera Aumer (formerly Katherine Aumer-Ryan, born 1981) is an American social psychologist. Her current research focuses on interpersonal relationships and identity issues concerning both culture and race. Her work has also focused on the psychology of hatred. Formerly an associate professor and chair of psychology at Hawaii Pacific University, she currently serves as an associate professor of psychology at the University of Hawaiʻi at West Oʻahu.

== Biography ==
Aumer received her B.A. in Psychology and Theatre in 2003 from the University of Iowa and her PhD from the University of Texas at Austin in 2008.

Aumer has been published in Social Justice Research, Personality and Social Psychology Bulletin, The Proceedings of the American Society for Information Science and Technology, Ethnic and Racial Studies, Sexual and Relationship Therapy, Journal of Relationship Research, Interpersona, and Proceedings of the Human Factors and Ergonomics Society Annual Meeting.
