= Proceedings of the Human Factors and Ergonomics Society Annual Meeting =

- Discipline: Ergonomics
- Language: English

Publication details
- Former names: Proceedings of the Annual Meeting of the Human Factors Society, Proceedings of the Human Factors Society Annual Meeting
- History: 1974-present
- Publisher: SAGE Publications
- Frequency: Annually

Standard abbreviations
- ISO 4: Proc. Hum. Factors Ergon. Soc. Annu. Meet.

Indexing
- ISSN: 1071-1813
- LCCN: 2002202176
- OCLC no.: 42412331

Links
- Journal homepage; Online access; Online archive

Proceedings of the Human Factors and Ergonomics Society Annual Meeting is an annual peer-reviewed academic journal that covers research in the field of ergonomics. It has been in publication since 1974 and is currently published by SAGE Publications in association with the Human Factors and Ergonomics Society.

== Abstracting and indexing ==
Proceedings of the Human Factors and Ergonomics Society Annual Meeting is abstracted and indexed in:

- E-psyche
- ProQuest
