= International Ergonomics Association =

The International Ergonomics Association (IEA) is a federation of ergonomics organizations from around the world. IEA was formed in 1959.

The mission of the IEA is to elaborate and advance ergonomics science and practice, and to improve the quality of life by expanding its scope of application and contribution to society.

The IEA:

- Has 52 Federated Societies from across the globe.
- Promotes and coordinates the international exchange of scientific and technical information by arranging and promoting conferences and meetings.
- Supports ergonomists and ergonomics in developing countries.
- Has goals and objectives derived from a strategic plan.
- Maintains a Directory of Educational Programs in ergonomics covering 35 countries.
- Has produced guidelines on Core Competencies in Ergonomics.
- Produced an agreed definition of "Ergonomics" in the year 2000.
- Is establishing a program of certification for Ergonomics QUality In Design (EQUID).
- Encourages development and application of ergonomics by administering nine different awards.

The IEA is governed by a council with representatives from the Federated societies. Day-to-day administration is performed by the Executive Committee that comprises the elected Officers and Chairs of the Standing Committees.
