= Human Factors (journal) =

- Discipline: Ergonomics, human factors, psychology
- Language: English
- Edited by: Robert G. Radwin

Publication details
- History: 1958-present
- Publisher: SAGE Publications in association with the Human Factors and Ergonomics Society
- Frequency: 12/year
- Impact factor: 3.3 (2025)

Standard abbreviations
- ISO 4: Hum. Factors

Indexing
- ISSN: 0018-7208 (print); 1547-8181 (web)
- LCCN: 59000837
- OCLC no.: 1329271

Links
- Journal homepage; Online access; Online archive

Human Factors is a peer-reviewed academic journal that publishes scientific studies in ergonomics. The editor-in-chief is Robert G. Radwin (University of Wisconsin-Madison). It was established in 1958 and is published by SAGE Publications in association with the Human Factors and Ergonomics Society.

== Abstracting and indexing ==
The journal is abstracted and indexed in Scopus and the Social Sciences Citation Index. According to the Journal Citation Reports, the journal has a 2025 impact factor of 3.3.
