= Human Factors and Ergonomics Society =

- Abbreviation: HFES
- Formation: 1957; 69 years ago
- Founded at: United States
- Type: Professional organization
- Legal status: Active
- Purpose: Advance the understanding and application of human factors and ergonomics.
- Headquarters: Washington, D.C., U.S.
- Region served: Worldwide
- Services: Publications, standards, conferences, educational resources
- Fields: Human factors, ergonomics
- Members: 4500
- Official language: English
- Publication: Human Factors, ANSI/HFES-100
- Affiliations: ANSI
- Website: www.hfes.org

The Human Factors and Ergonomics Society (HFES) is an interdisciplinary non-profit professional organization, headquartered in Washington, D.C., within the so-called Potomac Chapter of the organization. Founded in 1957, HFES is one of the federated societies of International ergonomics Association. HFES now claims 4500 members worldwide. HFES has 67 active chapters throughout the United States, Canada, and Europe; 42 of these are student chapters, and 23 are technical groups.

Members of HFES address a broad spectrum of issues arising in the growing field of human factors and ergonomics. In addition to the Human Factors journal, produced by an independent contractor, HFES publishes the ANSI/HFES-100 standard for ergonomic workstation setups, approved by the American National Standards Institute (ANSI) in 2007.

It was founded as the Human Factors Society of America.

== Presidents of the society ==
The following is a list of the past president of the society.

- 1957-1958: Laurence Morehouse
- 1958-1959: Renato Contini
- 1959-1960: Arnold M. Small
- 1960-1961: Stanley N. Roscoe
- 1961-1962: Jack W. Dunlap
- 1962-1963: Paul M. Fitts
- 1963-1964: Alphonse Chapanis
- 1964-1965: Julien M. Christensen
- 1965-1966: Ezra V. Saul
- 1966-1967: Stanley Lippert
- 1967-1968: John Lyman
- 1968-1969: Henry M. Parsons
- 1969-1970: Jack A. Kraft
- 1970-1971: Ross A. McFarland
- 1971-1972: Wesley E. Woodson
- 1972-1973: Stanley Deutsch
- 1973-1974: Charles O. Hopkins
- 1974-1975: David Meister
- 1975-1976: Lewis F. Hanes
- 1976-1977: Frederick A. Muckler
- 1977-1978: Richard W. Pew
- 1978-1979: Gloria L. Grace
- 1979-1980: Harry L. Snyder
- 1980-1981: Earl A. Alluisi
- 1981-1982: William B. Knowles
- 1982-1983: Robert C. Williges
- 1983-1984: Douglas H. Harris
- 1984-1985: Harry L. Davis
- 1985-1986: Richard J. Hornick
- 1986-1987: Julien M. Christensen
- 1987-1988: John D. Gould
- 1988-1989: Earl L. Wiener
- 1989-1990: Mark S. Sanders
- 1990-1991: Thomas B. Sheridan
- 1991-1992: Kenneth R. Laughery, Sr.
- 1992-1993: Thomas B. Malone
- 1993-1994: Deborah A. Boehm-Davis
- 1994-1995: F. Thomas Eggemeier
- 1995-1996: Hal W. Hendrick
- 1996-1997: Arthur D. Fisk
- 1997-1998: Harold P. Van Cott
- 1998-1999: David D. Woods
- 1999-2000: Peter A. Hancock
- 2000-2001: William C. Howell
- 2001-2002: David L. Post
- 2002-2003: Barry H. Beith
- 2003-2004: Betty M. Sanders
- 2004-2005: Wendy A. Rogers
- 2005-2006: Marvin J. Dainoff
- 2006-2007: Waldemar Karwowski
- 2007-2008: John F. "Jeff" Kelley
- 2008-2009: Paul A. Green
- 2009-2010: Kathleen L. Mosier
- 2010-2011: Anthony D. Andre
- 2011-2012: Mica R. Endsley
- 2012-2013: Eduardo Salas
- 2013-2014: Francis T. Durso
- 2014-2015: Andrew S. Imada
- 2015-2016: William S. Marras
- 2016-2017: Nancy J. Cooke
- 2017-2018: Valerie J. Berg Rice
- 2018-2019: Kermit G. Davis
- 2019-2020: M. Susan Hallbeck
- 2020-2021: Peter A. Hancock
- 2021-2022: Christopher R. Reid
- 2022-2023: Carolyn Sommerich
- 2023-2024: Susan Kotowski
- 2024-2025: Camille Peres
