= Black Spot =

Black Spot, black spot, or black stain may refer to:

== Diseases ==
- Black spot (roses), a plant disease caused by a fungus
- Black spot disease (fish), a fish disease also known as diplopstomiasis
- Black spot leaf disease, a plant disease affecting certain grape varieties

== Film and television ==
- Black Spot, a short Israeli film in the pastiche Yellow Asphalt
- Black spot, place in which television reception is impossible
- The Black Spot (film), a 1914 British silent thriller film
- Black Spot (TV series), a French-Belgian television series
- "The Black Spot" (It: Welcome to Derry), an episode of It: Welcome to Derry

== Other uses ==
- Accident blackspot or black spot, a place where road traffic accidents have historically been concentrated
  - Black spot, a section of roadway designated as an accident black spot in the Australian Government's Black Spot Program
- Black Spot (aircraft), a series of attack aircraft tested by the US Air Force in the Vietnam War
- Black spot, a marking made on Hindu children in South Asia to protect them from the evil eye, or nazar battu
- Black Spot (Treasure Island), a literary device in Treasure Island, a novel by Robert Louis Stevenson
- The Black Stain (La Tache Noire), an 1887 painting by Albert Bettannier
- La Mancha Negra (translated as "The black stain"), a mysterious substance found in Venezuela

== See also ==
- Blackspot (disambiguation)
- Black dot (disambiguation)
- Black hole (disambiguation)
- Blackmark (disambiguation)
