= Blackspot =

Blackspot can refer to:

- A campaign by Adbusters
- Accident blackspot
- Apple scab or Pear scab

Animals:

- Blackspot climbing perch
- Blackspot shark
- Blackspot skate
- Blackspot tuskfish

== See also ==
- Black spot (disambiguation)
- Blackmark (disambiguation)
