= Black Market (disambiguation) =

A black market is a covert trade in illegal or stolen goods.

Black Market or The Black Market may also refer to:

== Locations ==
- The Black Market (Cork), a food market in Cork City, Ireland

== Music ==
- "Black Market", a song written by Friedrich Hollaender and sung by Marlene Dietrich in the 1948 film A Foreign Affair
- Black Market (Weather Report album), 1976
- Black Market (Rick Ross album), 2015
- The Black Market (Rise Against album), 2014
- Black Market Music (record label), Australian blues and roots music label

== Film and television ==
- Kala Bazaar (English: Black Market), a 1989 Indian film
- Kala Bazar (English: Black Market), a 1960 Indian film
- Black Market, a 1946 Egyptian film made by Studio Misr
- "Black Market" (Battlestar Galactica), TV episode
- Black Market (1967 film), an Indian film
- The Black Market (film), an Argentine crime film
- Black Market (2026 film), a Nigerian crime thriller film

== Publications ==
- Black Friday (Patterson novel), originally published as Black Market, 1986 novel by James Patterson
- Black Market Magazine, defunct American entertainment magazine

== See also ==
- Black Marketing, a 1943 propaganda short film
- Notorious market, black market designation by the United States Trade Representative
- Black mark (disambiguation)
