= Forward air control during the Vietnam War =

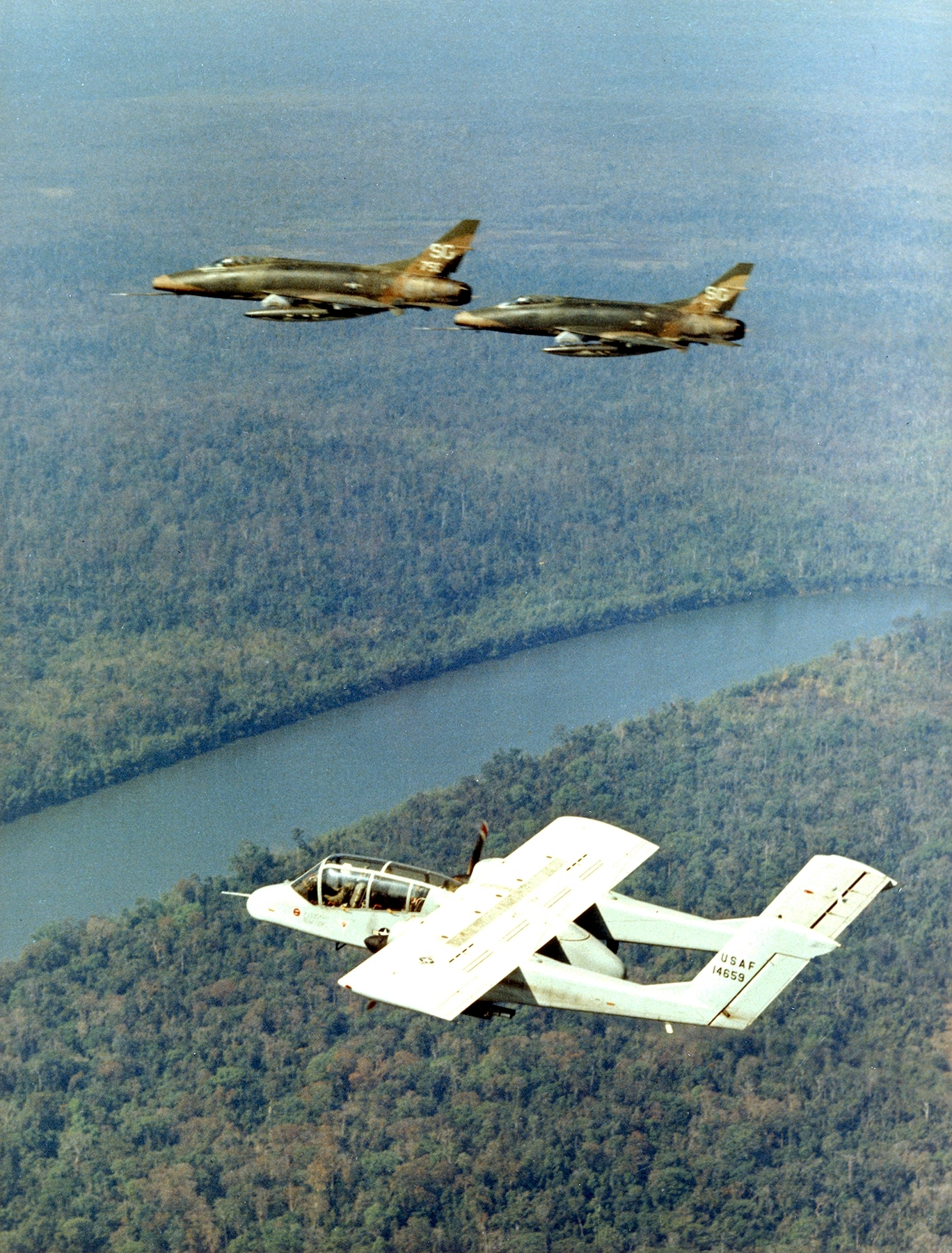
A U.S. Air Force North American OV-10A-30-NH Bronco in flight with two North American F-100C Super Sabres of the 136th Tactical Fighter Squadron

Forward air controllers (FACs) played a significant part in the Vietnam War from the very start. Largely relegated to airborne duty by the constraints of jungled terrain, FACs began operations as early as 1962. Using makeshift propeller-driven aircraft and inadequate radio nets, they became so essential to air operations that the overall need for FACs would not be completely satisfied until 1969. The FAC's expertise as an air strike controller also made him an intelligence source, munitions expert, communication specialist, and above all, the on-scene commander of the strike forces and the start of any subsequent combat search and rescue if necessary.

Present as advisors under Farm Gate, FACs grew even more important as American troops poured into Vietnam after the Gulf of Tonkin incident. The U.S. Air Force (USAF) would swell its FAC complement to as many as 668 FACs in Vietnam by 1968; there were also FACs from the U.S. Army, U.S. Navy, U.S. Marine Corps, and allied nations. For the early years of the war USAF manning levels were at about 70% of need; they finally reached 100% in December 1969. The FACs would be essential participants in close air support in South Vietnam, interdiction efforts against the Ho Chi Minh Trail, supporting a guerrilla war on the Plain of Jars in Laos, and probing home defenses in North Vietnam.

As the war came to center on the Trail in 1969, the FAC role began to be marginalized. Anti-aircraft (AAA) defenses became steadily more aggressive and threatening along the Trail as the bombing of North Vietnam closed down. The communist enemy moved their supply activities to nighttime, quite literally leaving the FACs in the dark. The American response was twofold. They used fixed-wing gunships with electronic sensors to detect communist trucks, and onboard weaponry to destroy them. They also began putting FACs in jet aircraft and in flareships as a counter to the AAA threat. At about the same time, emplaced ground sensors began to complement and overshadow FAC reconnaissance as an intelligence source. FAC guidance of munitions also began to come into play in 1970.

By the time the Vietnam War ended in 1975, the U.S. and its allies had dropped about six times as many tons of bombs as had been dropped in the entirety of World War II. A considerable proportion of this tonnage had been directed by forward air controllers.

== Operating environment ==
=== Terrain ===
The Forward Air Controller (FAC) fulfilled many duties during the Second Indochina War. In addition to the usual close air support strike missions to aid South Vietnamese ground forces in their struggle against insurgents backed by the Democratic Republic of Vietnam, he might direct combat search and rescue operations or air interdiction strikes on the Ho Chi Minh Trail. Other FAC duties included escort of supply truck convoys, or involvement in covert operations. The FAC also advised ground commanders on usage of air power, and trained indigenous personnel in forward air control. Most of all, he flew the core mission of visual reconnaissance, seeking information on the enemy.

The airborne FAC flew the Cessna O-1 Bird Dog or other light aircraft slowly over the rough terrain at low altitude to maintain constant aerial surveillance. By patrolling the same area constantly, the FACs grew very familiar with the terrain, and they learned to detect any changes that could indicate enemy forces hiding below. The rugged jungle terrain of South East Asia easily hid enemy troop movements. However, the FAC looked for tracks on the ground, dust settling in foliage, roiled water in streams—all signs of furtive enemy movement. Both unexpected campfire plumes and rows of fresh vegetables growing near water in "uninhabited" areas were also tip-offs to communist camps. However, decoy camps were not unknown; ofttimes fires were kept underground, with the smoke plumes being redirected through a laterally extended chimney. The communist insurgents were proficient in both camouflage and disguise. Camouflage extended down to individual soldiers using green branches to garnish backpacks. As part of disguise, the insurgents would sometimes dress as civilians, even going so far as to dress as monks or as women carrying small children. Despite these evasions, by 1968 FAC visual recon had largely suppressed daytime communist activities.

Flying low and slow over enemy forces was very dangerous for the FACs; however the enemy usually held his fire to avoid discovery. However, when the enemy opened fire, it might hit him with anything from rifle bullets to 37mm antiaircraft cannon. A low pass for post-strike bomb damage assessment was another hazardous duty.

American ground FACs began to supply on-the-job training to South Vietnamese counterparts in Tactical Air Control Parties, in an effort to improve poor performance by the local FACs. However, rough terrain, limited sight lines, and difficulty in communication always seriously hindered ground FAC efforts in Southeast Asia.

=== FAC aircraft ===
A wide variety of aircraft were used in the forward air control role.

==== Propeller-driven ====
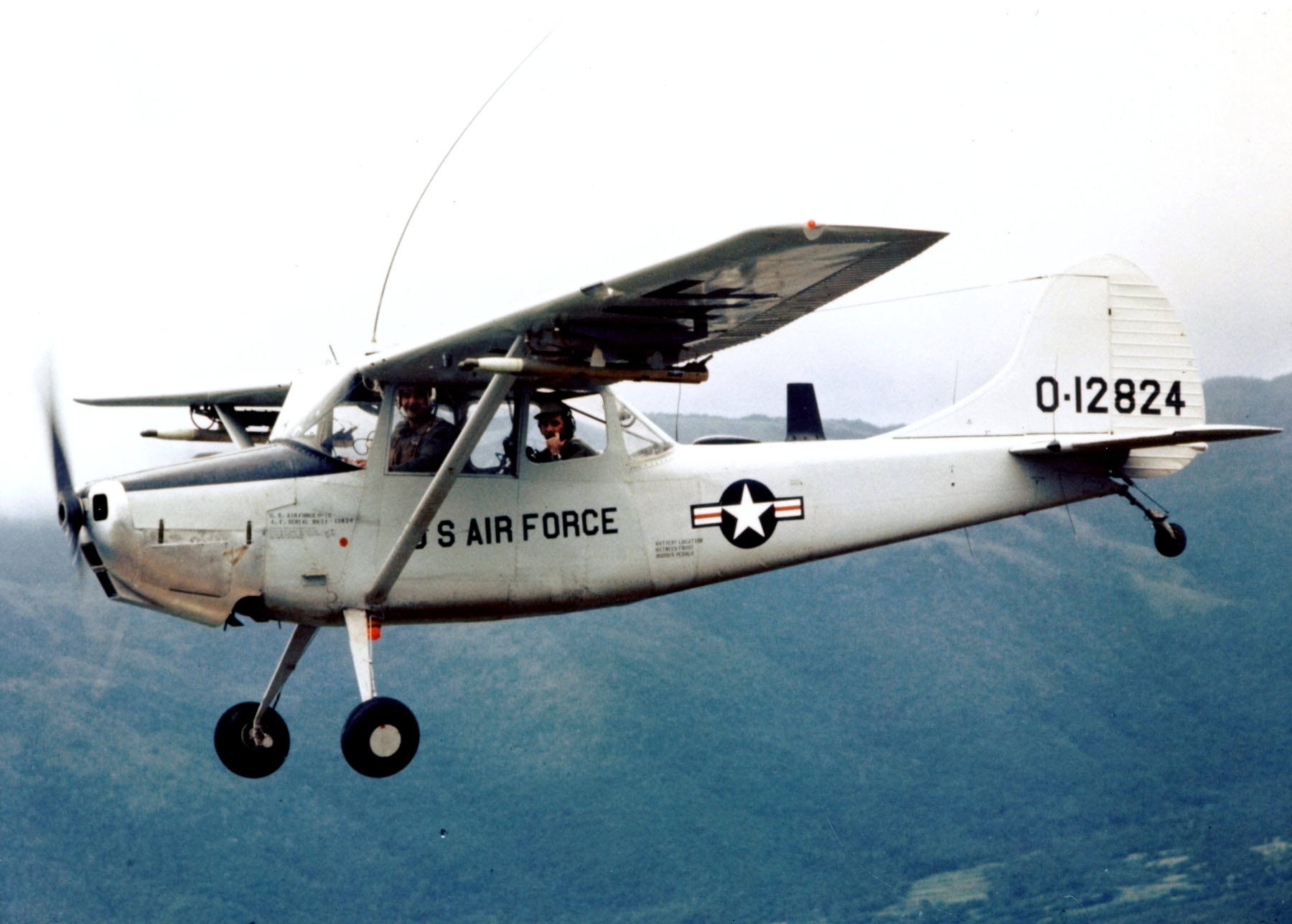
An O-1A over Vietnam.

Common propeller-driven FAC aircraft were:

- Cessna O-1 Bird Dog: This two-seater served as the original FAC aircraft. Slow, unarmed and unarmored, its small size limited its payload and it did not have instrumentation for night operations. Although it carried three radios for air strike coordination—Frequency Modulation, High Frequency, and Very High Frequency—only one radio channel was available at a time.

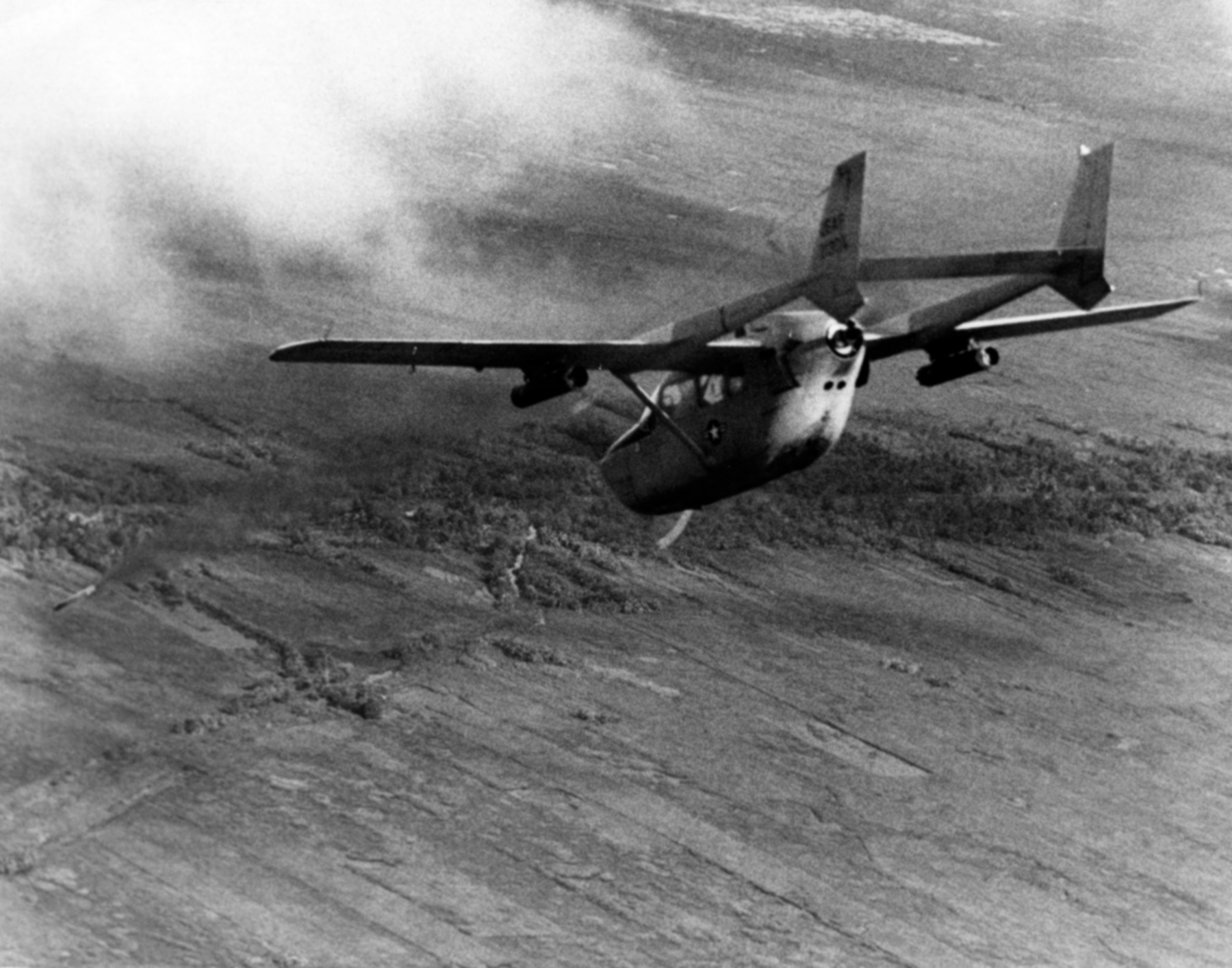
An O-2A fires smoke markers at a target.

- Cessna O-2 Skymaster: 510 were modified for military service. A businessman's aircraft, it was adapted for interim use by FACs, to replace the O-1. It was a faster airplane, with two engines in a tractor/pusher arrangement, four hard points for ordnance, and a seven-hour linger time. Its side by side seating limited the pilot's line of vision to the right and to the rear.

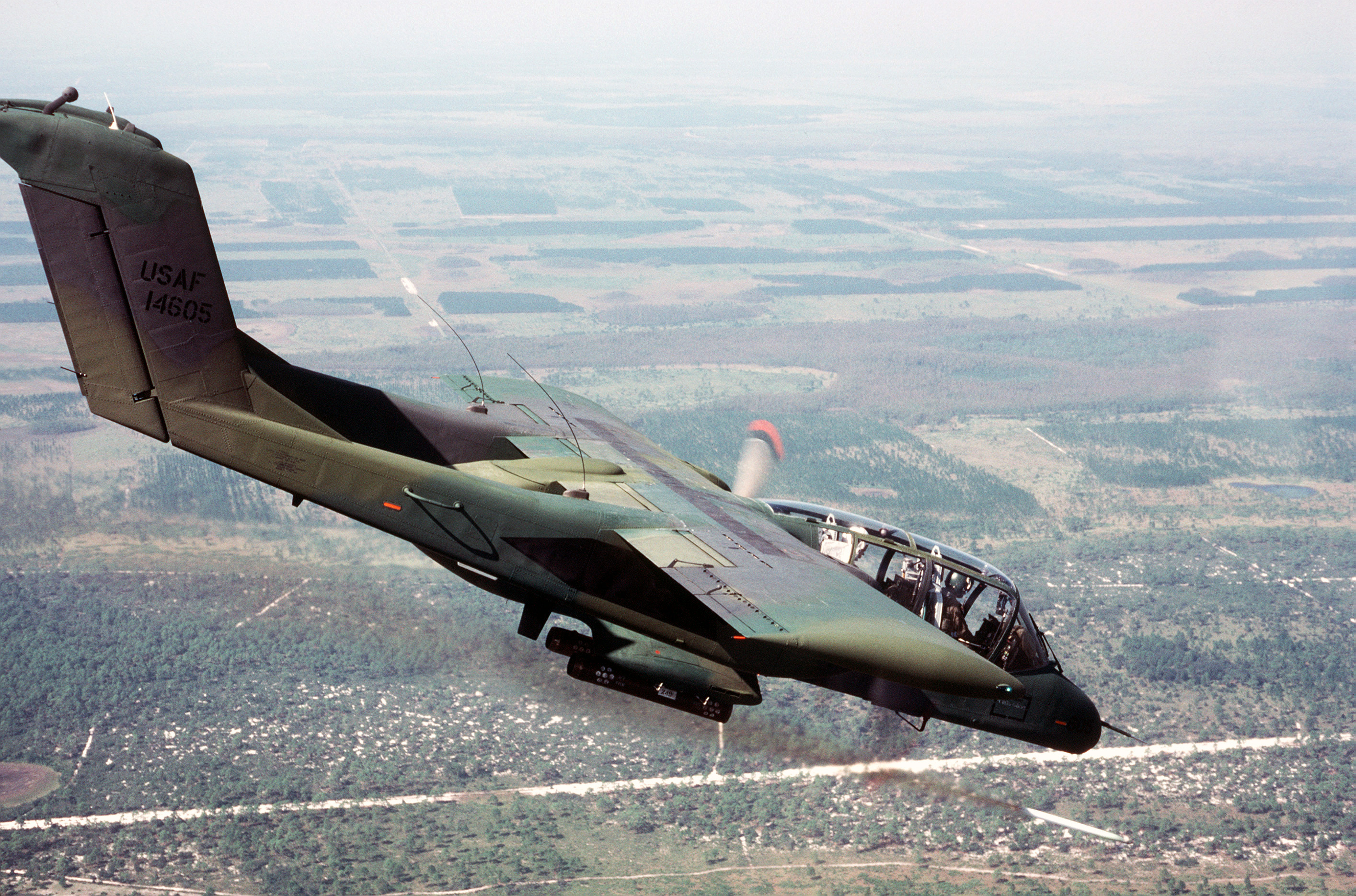
A USAF OV-10A firing a white phosphorus smoke rocket to mark a ground target

- OV-10 Bronco: The first American airplane designed for FAC work; entered combat service on 6 July 1968. With double an O-1's speed, excellent all-around sight lines for observation, an armored cockpit, and an avionics suite that included eight secure radios along with the flight instruments, the OV-10's five ordnance hard points made it a potent combination of FAC and light strike aircraft. By 1972, the Bronco was responsible for laser illuminating targets for about 60% of the "smart bombs" dropped in Vietnam.

Other propeller-driven aircraft were also used as FAC aircraft, usually in an interim, ad hoc, or specialized role:

- Cessna U-17 Skywagon
- North American T-28 Trojan
- A-26 Invader
- A-1 Skyraider
- OV-1 Mohawk
- Fairchild AC-119
- C-123 Provider: Call sign "Candlestick"
- C-130 Hercules: Call sign "Blindbat"
- Douglas RC-47P
- C-7 Caribou

==== Fast FAC jet ====
Jet aircraft were also used for FAC duties:

- Grumman F-9 Cougar: Used by U.S. Marine Corps as original Fast FAC experiment
- F-100 Super Sabre: Call sign "Misty"
- McDonnell Douglas F-4 Phantom II: Call signs "Stormy", "Wolf", "Night Owl", "Whiplash/Laredo"
- Martin B-57 Canberra

=== Rules of engagement ===
The Rules of Engagement (ROE) placed restrictions on the use and direction of air strikes. In 1961, when American pilots and South Vietnamese FACs began to fly combat missions together, the first ROE was established. The original requirement was that only the Vietnamese FACs could drop ordnance because all air strikes required the approval of the South Vietnamese government. Also, aircraft could return fire if fired upon, in what was dubbed "armed reconnaissance".

On 25 January 1963, the ROE were updated to establish some free-fire zones containing only enemy troops; permission was not needed to place an air strike there. The requirement for Vietnamese approval was also waived for night missions supporting troops in contact, so long as they were supported by a Douglas C-47 flareship. By 1964, the ROEs had changed to allow U.S. Army aircraft to observe from as low as 50 feet, while the USAF and VNAF were held to a 500-foot minimum. As the war evolved, so did the ROE; they became more complex. Different branches of the military service—U.S. Air Force, U.S. Army, U.S. Marine Corps, U.S. Navy—flew under differing rules. For instance, the requirement for a Vietnamese FAC on-board was waived for U.S. Army FACs. On 9 March 1965, U.S. air was cleared to strike in South Vietnam with airplanes stationed in-country; however, Thailand-based bombers were forbidden to hit South Vietnamese targets.

The ROE changed according to the location of the action and force involved. Only USAF FACs could support U.S. Army ground forces in South Vietnam, unless the Army was operating in a free fire zone. And while the military approved air strikes in Vietnam, approval of any target in Laos depended on the American ambassador.

Common to all iterations of the ROE was insistence on aligning strike runs so ordnance was dropped or fired headed away from friendly troops and innocent civilians, and toward the enemy troops. Extraordinary circumstances might find a FAC constrained to direct a drop parallel to friendly lines. Only in dire emergencies would the FAC decree approve strikes in a direction toward friendly forces. The ROE were also clear that, no matter how junior in rank the FAC, he was in complete control of the air strike. Inattentive or disobedient pilots were sometimes told to carry their bombs back to base. There is anecdotal evidence that "friendly fire" incidents were reported all the way to the U.S. president.

An outstanding example of FAC salvation of the civilian populace occurred on 8 February 1968. Several hundred refugees moving on Route 9 from Khe Sanh to Lang Vei were spared an artillery barrage when Captain Charles Rushforth identified them as a non-military target.

Staff personnel tested the FACs on the ROE on a monthly basis. The FAC might have to master more than one set of the ROEs. The complexity of the Rules, and the aggravation of conforming with them, were a prime recruiter for the Raven FACs working undercover in Laos.

=== System ===
In many cases, the forward air control system began with the forward air controller being pre-briefed on a target. He then planned his attack mission. In other cases, an immediate air request came in requiring a rapid response; the FAC might have to divert from a pre-briefed target. In any case, the FAC would rendezvous with the strike aircraft, preferably out of view of the targeted enemy. Once permission to strike was verified, the FAC marked the target, usually with a smoke rocket. Once the strike aircraft identified the marked target, they were directed by the FAC. Once the strike was complete, the FAC would make a bomb damage assessment and report it.

The FAC was the most important link in any one of the air control systems; in any of them he served as a hub for the strike effort. He was in radio contact not just with the strike aircraft; he also talked to the Airborne Command and Control Center coordinating airstrike availability, to ground forces, and to the headquarters approving the strike. He was supported by Tactical Air Control Parties co-located with ground forces' headquarters ranging down to the regimental, brigade, or battalion level. However, the multiplicity of systems, their equipment shortages, and the inexperience of participants, all handicapped the FAC in the Vietnam War.

In summary, whether airborne or ground bound, a FAC's expertise as an air strike controller made him an intelligence source, munitions expert, communication specialist, and above all, the on-scene commander of the strike forces and the start of any subsequent combat search and rescue if necessary.

== Operations ==
There were four focal points of anti-communist air operations during the Second Indochina War. Only two of these four focal points were located in Vietnam.

=== South Vietnam ===
==== Before the Tonkin Gulf Incident ====
The U.S. Air Force had shut down FAC operations after the Korean War, in 1956. In 1961 it revived the doctrine and sent five fighter pilots as FACs to Bien Hoa Air Base in the Farm Gate contingent to advise and train the Republic of Vietnam Air Force (VNAF) in directing air strikes from O-1 Bird Dogs. In the process, the USAF reinvented both forward air control and the Air Commandos. The reinvention was complicated by the language and cultural difficulties between Americans and Vietnamese, the clash between the two country's differing FAC procedures, and South Vietnamese policies toward FACs. Inadequate radios and a clash of four differing communications procedures—U.S. Army, U.S. Air Force, U.S. Marine Corps, and the VNAF—would plague attempts to standardize a forward air control system. Although all users agreed that strike aircraft should be diverted from preplanned missions to supply close air support, the U.S. Air Force, U.S. Army, and the Vietnamese military each followed different new complex communication procedures for the redirection. The U.S. Air Force believed in a centralized top-down control system. The U.S. Army opted for a decentralized one. The Vietnamese had a more complex centralized system, and trusted only a very few senior officers and officials to approve strikes. The U.S. Special Forces sometimes was forced to circumvent any system because of dire emergencies. The Marines continued their organic system of Marine fliers supporting Marine infantry.

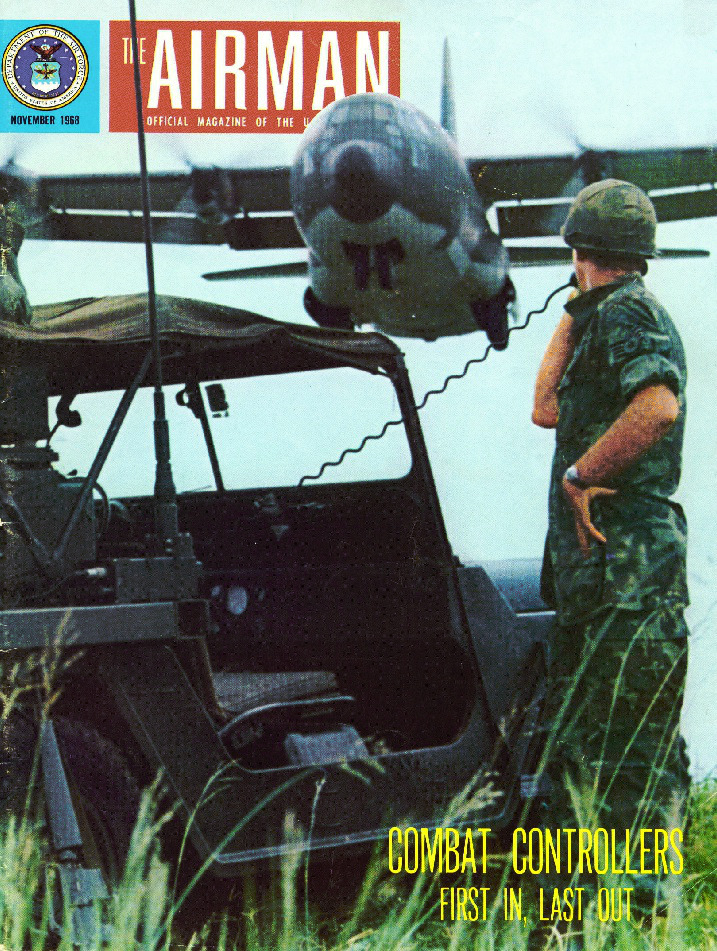
Combat Controllers in Vietnam featured on the cover of a 1968 issue of Airman Magazine.

The FACS' situation was aggravated by shortages and maldistribution of the most basic supplies. A 1957 inter-service agreement laid supply responsibility for U.S. Air Force FAC efforts to support the U.S. Army on the Army. The latter owned the O-1 Bird Dogs; both the USAF and the VNAF depended on transfers of the aircraft to them. Both radio jeeps and ordinary vehicles were in short supply. Supplies all around were scanty, and the logistics system was a nightmare. With the Army doing such a poor job of supply, the USAF assumed the responsibility, but logistics problems would dog the FACs until war's end.

In December, 1961, the Tactical Air Control System set up as part of the Farm Gate effort began handling air offensive operations, including airborne forward air control. On 8 December 1961, the U.S. Joint Chiefs of Staff granted the newly re-established 1st Air Commando Group authority to strike communist insurgents. On 8 February 1962, the Air Operations Center for Vietnam was set up at Tan Son Nhut on the outskirts of Saigon; it would be the command and control network for forward air control. In April 1962, a USAF study concluded only 32 American FACs were required for Vietnam service; by the time the last of the 32 had been assigned a year later, they were obviously insufficient.

On 14 April 1962, the VNAF began training Forward Air Guides (FAGs) as ground personnel to aid airborne FACs. By 1 July 1962, 240 FAGs had been trained, but were authorized to direct air strikes only in an emergency. The FAGs were often misassigned upon return to duty, and seldom used in practice. The FAG training program dwindled away. At the same time, the Americans tried to "sell" the concept of a FAC stationed as an Air Liaison Officer at each Vietnamese headquarters as an advisor on air power.

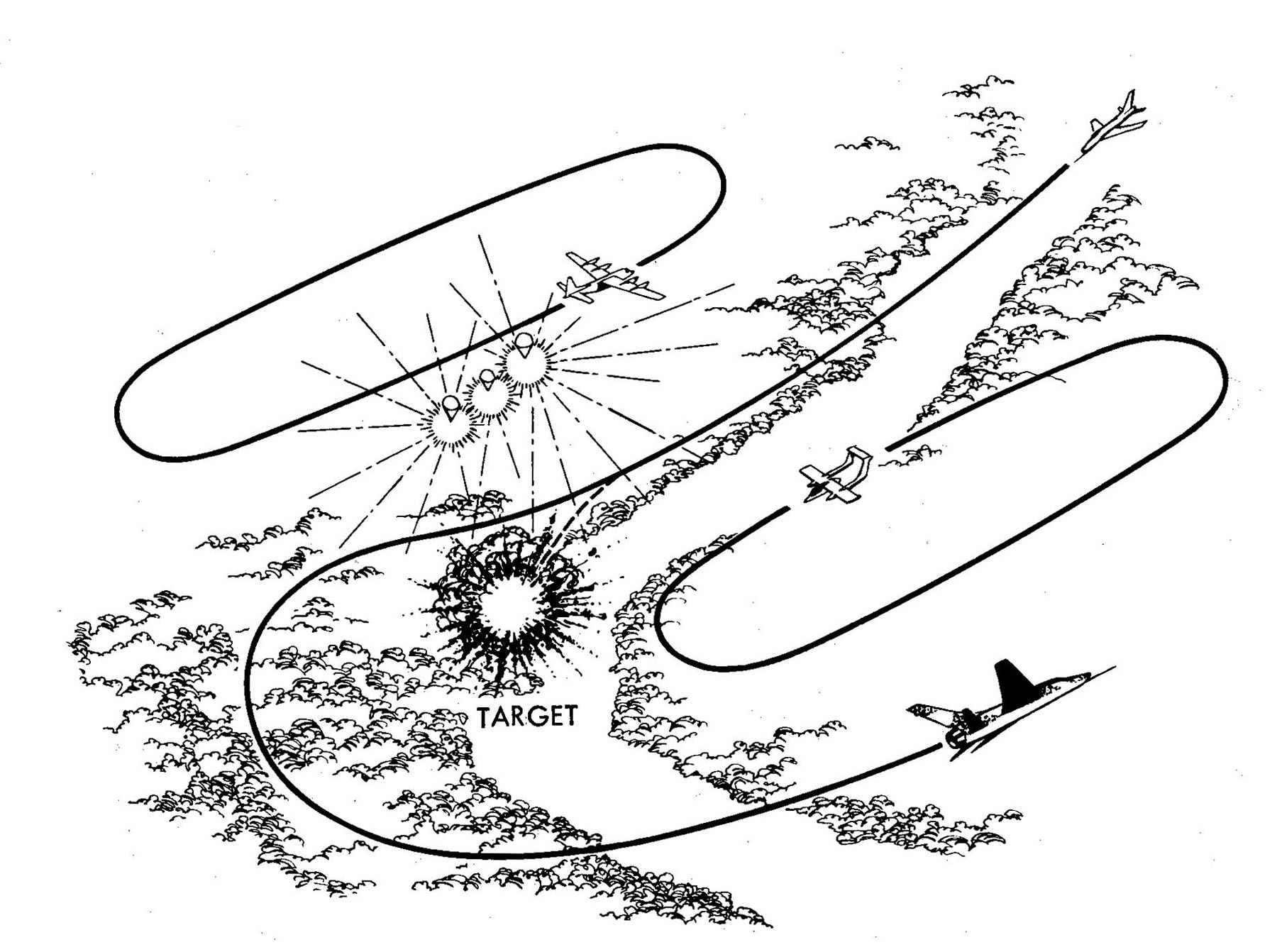
Flareship operation

At night, the communist guerrillas would attack detachments of Army of the Republic of Vietnam (ARVN) troops in isolated hamlets. The Farm Gate air commandos improvised a night FAC procedure, using a C-47 to drop flares, with T-28s or A-26 Invaders dive bombing under the flares. The Viet Cong fled these strikes. Eventually, it took only the first flare for the communists to break off an assault.

In 1962, elements of Marine Observation Squadron 2 landed at Soc Trang to join the forward air control effort. The squadron would later transition from the O-1 to UH-1 Huey helicopters. It was also in 1962 that the communists began to attack convoys moving supplies within South Vietnam. A program of shadowing truck convoys with FAC O-1s began; no escorted resupply column was ambushed during early 1963.

As the war escalated, the Vietnamese military needed more FACs than could be trained. The U.S. Air Force responded by activating the 19th Tactical Air Support Squadron (19th TASS) at Bien Hoa Air Base on 17 June 1963. Despite chronic shortages of aircraft, vehicles, and radios, the 19th TASS would persevere into combat readiness. However, their effectiveness was constrained by the fact that the Vietnamese FACs were subject to prosecution for any "friendly fire" incidents. The U.S. Army's 73d Aviation Company also began FAC duties at this time; they were somewhat more successful than the 19th TASS because the Army allowed surveillance from a lower altitude than the USAF.

==== After the Tonkin Gulf Incident ====
After the Gulf of Tonkin incident served as the American casus belli in August 1964, the United States began to add large numbers of ground troops needing air support in South Vietnam. As of January, 1965, there were only 144 USAF airborne FACs to support them; 76 of these were assigned as advisers. There were also 68 VNAF FACs, but only 38 aircraft, in the four Vietnamese liaison squadrons. Yet the Rules of Engagement mandated a forward air controller direct all air strikes in South Vietnam. At this juncture, the overloaded air control mission began to metastasize in response to events. On 7 February 1965, Viet Cong guerrillas attacked Pleiku Air Base. On 2 March, the U.S. retaliated by beginning a campaign, Operation Rolling Thunder, to bomb North Vietnam. To streamline operations, the American FACs were relieved of the necessity of carrying Vietnamese observers to validate targets on 9 March. The Operation Steel Tiger interdiction campaign against the Ho Chi Minh Trail and the Demilitarized Zone was started on 3 April 1965. In September 1965, the USAF's 12th Tactical Air Control Party (TACP) landed in Vietnam to begin management of the FAC force. TACPs were slated to be assigned one per maneuver battalion, one per brigade headquarters, and four per divisional headquarters.

Chairman of the U.S. Joint Chiefs of Staff General Earle G. Wheeler visited South Vietnam in the midst of all this, in March 1965. He saw a need for more FACs. Immediately after his return stateside, the JCS authorized three more Tactical Air Support Squadrons in June 1965.

In the midst of this buildup in number of FACs, the first Airborne Command and Control Center was launched to serve as a relay between TACP and the FAC pilots. ABCCC would become the inflight nerve center of the Vietnam air war. It not only kept track of all other aircraft, it served "to assure proper execution of the fragged missions and to act as, a central control agency in diversion of the strike force to secondary and lucrative targets." ABCCC would expand into a twenty-four-hour-per-day program directing all air activity in the war.

By early 1965, the USAF had realized that TACAN radar was a near-necessity for bombing operations, due to the lack of reliable maps and other navigation aids. As a result, Combat Skyspot radars were emplaced throughout South Vietnam and elsewhere in Southeast Asia.

By October, 1965, the U. S. Air Force realized it still had an insufficient number of FACs. Although the Rules of Engagement were changed to lessen the workload on the FAC force, the USAF continued short of trained Forward Air Controllers until the U. S. drawdown of troops lessened demand.

By April 1966, five Tactical Air Support Squadrons had filled out the Air Force combat units of the 504th Tactical Air Support Group. The squadrons were based thus:

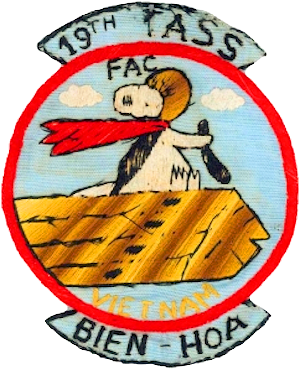
"Snoopy" Emblem, Bien Hoa AB, RVN

- 19th Tactical Air Support Squadron: Bien Hoa Air Base, Republic of Vietnam (RVN)
- 20th Tactical Air Support Squadron: Da Nang Air Base, RVN
- 21st Tactical Air Support Squadron: Pleiku Air Base, RVN
- 22d Tactical Air Support Squadron: Binh Thuy Air Base, RVN
- 23d Tactical Air Support Squadron: Nakhon Phanom Royal Thai Air Force Base, Kingdom of Thailand

The 504th Group served mostly for logistics, maintenance, and administrative functions. It comprised only 250 O-1 Bird Dog FACs for all South Vietnam. The FACs were supposed to be assigned two per maneuver battalion. However, the FACs were actually assigned to ground force brigades and lived and worked with the battalions on active operations. As of September 1966, in the wake of establishing the 23d TASS, the FAC effort was still short 245 O-1 Bird Dogs, with no suitable alternatives.

From December 1965 onwards, close air support for the U.S. Navy's riverine forces in the Mekong Delta came from carrier aviation. On 3 January 1969, the U. S. Navy raised its own forward air control squadron, VAL-4, using OV-10 Broncos borrowed from the Marine Corps. VAL-4 was stationed at Binh Thuy and Vung Tau, and would fly 21,000 combat sorties before its disbandment on 10 April 1972. Those sorties would be a mix of light strike missions and forward air control.

The 220th Reconnaissance Airplane Company, under operation control of 3rd MARDIV in I Corps, was the only Army company officially authorized to direct air strikes. Due to the Marine pilots of VMO-6 being overstretched by the intensity of combat operations in the DMZ, pilots of the 220th were, uniquely, given the Marine designation of Tactical Air Coordinator (Airborne). As airborne controllers, they were formally approved to run air strikes in addition to directing artillery and Naval gunfire.

The Royal Australian Air Force sent 36 experienced and well-trained FACs to serve in Vietnam, either attached to USAF units or with No. 9 Squadron RAAF. One of them, Flight Lieutenant Garry Cooper (see Further reading section below), served with such distinction he was recommended for the Medal of Honor by Major General Julian Ewell. The Royal New Zealand Air Force placed 15 of its FACs under U. S. command during the war.

By 1968, there were 668 Air Force FACs in country, scattered at 70 forward operating locations throughout South Vietnam. By November, a minimum of 736 FACs were deemed necessary for directing the air war, but only 612 were available. The USAF was scanting and diluting the requirement that all FACs be qualified fighter pilots by this time, in its effort to supply the demand. FAC manning levels from 1965 through 1968 averaged only about 70% of projected need. By this time, the cessation of enemy daytime activities in areas surveilled by FACs, as the communists changed to night operations, would lead to a shift to night FAC operations by some O-2s. One hundred percent manning of the FAC requirement effort would finally come in December, 1969, via lessened demand for the mission.

==== The Mekong Delta and the Cambodian incursion ====
Following preliminary trial against the Ho Chi Minh Trail, Operation Shed Light A-1 Skyraiders fitted with low-light-level television were tested in night operations over the Mekong Delta. Flying at 2,000 to 2,500 feet altitude, the A-1s found enemy targets on 83% of their sorties, and launched attacks in about half these sightings. The A-1s took more hits over the Delta than they had over the Trail, and the television did not work as well as expected. By the time the test was over on 1 December 1968, the USAF had decided to further develop the sensor. The cameras were stripped from the test A-1s, and the aircraft forwarded to the 56th Special Operations Wing. However, the low-light-level television would be further developed as part of a sensor package installed in Martin B-57 Canberra bombers.

The communists used Cambodia as a sanctuary for their troops, flanking the South Vietnamese effort and venturing across the border into South Vietnam's Mekong Delta for operations and retreating into "neutral" territory to escape counterattacks. On 20 April 1970, the Cambodian government asked the U.S. for help with the problem of the border sanctuaries. On 30 April, the U.S. and South Vietnam sent ground forces into Cambodia to destroy communist supplies and sanctuaries. They were supported by a huge air campaign. Four Tactical Air Support Squadrons were committed to the effort—the 19th, 20th, 22d, and 23d. To handle such a massive effort, a TACP was committed, relaying its instructions to FACs through a central airborne FAC dubbed "Head Beagle". When he proved unequal to handling the volume of incoming air support, a Lockheed EC-121 Warning Star was assigned to the task in December 1970. Although American ground forces withdrew from Cambodia by 1 July, the air interdiction campaign continued. A detachment of the 19th TASS, the French-speaking "Rustic" FACs, remained to patrol in support of Cambodian troops. The American FACs would covertly support the Cambodian non-communists by directing massive U. S. air strikes until 15 August 1973.

=== North Vietnam ===
The U.S. military considered the Demilitarized Zone (DMZ) and the southern portion of North Vietnam as an extension of the South Vietnamese battleground. In 1966, the U.S. used FACs from the 20th TASS, flying O-1 Bird Dogs and later O-2 Skymasters, to direct air strikes in the Route Pack 1 portion of Rolling Thunder. Contained within Route Pack 1, Tally Ho took in the southern end of the Route Pack plus the DMZ. By August 1966, communist anti-aircraft fire made eastern half of Tally Ho too hazardous for the O-1s. As ground fire made the Tally Ho mission increasingly hazardous for the slow prop planes, the Marines pioneered Fast FACs in Vietnam, using two-seated F9F Panther jets in this area, as well on deep targets on the Ho Chi Minh Trail. The Marine Fast FACs also adjusted naval gunfire when they were north of the DMZ. There were also pioneering efforts by "Misty" Fast FACs.

The greatest effect Rolling Thunder had on FAC usage was its demise. President Johnson halted bombing above 20 degrees north longitude in North Vietnam on 1 April 1968. On 1 November 1968, he entirely ended the bombing of North Vietnam, closing Operation Rolling Thunder. These halts would cause a drastic redirection of American air power toward the Ho Chi Minh Trail in Laos.

=== Laos ===
The basis for military operations in Laos were radically different from that in Vietnam. Laotian neutrality had been established by the international treaty of the 1954 Geneva Agreement which prohibited any foreign military except a small French military mission. In December 1961, General Phoumi Nosavan seized control of the Kingdom of Laos in the Battle of Vientiane. The Central Intelligence Agency (CIA) backed his rise to power and established themselves and their Thai mercenaries as the prime advisers to the Lao armed forces. On 29 May 1961, because there could be no military advisory group in Laos, U.S. President John F. Kennedy granted the Ambassador control of all American paramilitary activities within that country. Thus it was that the CIA gained charge of the ground war in Laos. They contracted out aerial supply missions in the country to the civilian pilots of the CIA's captive airline, Air America. U.S. Air Force FACs would be secretively imported by the ambassador to control air strikes under his supervision.

The initial use of forward air control in northern Laos was a sub rosa effort by both airborne and ground FACs during 19–29 July 1964 for Operation Triangle. Heartened by this experience, the USAF initially used enlisted Combat Controllers garbed as civilians, with the call sign "Butterfly", to direct air strikes from civilian aircraft flown by Air America. After General William Momyer cancelled the "Butterfly" assignment, the Raven forward air control unit was created on 5 May 1966 for service in Laos as a successor to the Butterfly program. The U.S. Air Force's Project 404 began an organized FAC effort at the request of Ambassador William H. Sullivan. These Raven FACs were stationed throughout Laos. Two of their Air Operations Centers were in northern Laos, at Luang Prabang and Long Tieng. Two more AOCs edged the Ho Chi Minh Trail, at Pakxe and Savannakhet. A fifth AOC was at Vientiane.

Project 404 accepted veteran FACs in the Vietnam theater who volunteered for the Raven FAC assignment; they tended to be warriors frustrated with bureaucracy and Byzantine Rules of Engagement. Few in number, flying in civilian clothing in unmarked O-1 Bird Dogs or U-17s, the Ravens often faced overwhelming tasks. In one instance, a FAC flew 14 combat hours in a single day. In another, a FAC directed 1,000 air strikes in 280 combat hours within a month. Upon occasion, queues of up to six fighter-bomber flights awaited target marking by a Raven. By 1969, 60% of all tactical air strikes flown in Southeast Asia were expended in Laos. The ranks of the Ravens were greatly augmented to handle this stepped-up air offensive, though they never exceeded 22.

Working as a Raven FAC was an exhausting, high-risk, high-stress job. By war's end, there had been 161 Butterflies and Ravens directing air strikes in Laos; 24 were lost in action. The overall casualty rate ran about 50%. By the end of his tour, Raven Craig Duehring calculated that 90% of their planes had been hit by ground fire at some point, and 60% had been downed.

Nor were the Ravens the only FACs working in Laos. By mid 1969, about 91 FAC sorties per day were launched into Laos, about a third of them jet FACs.

==== Northern Laos ====
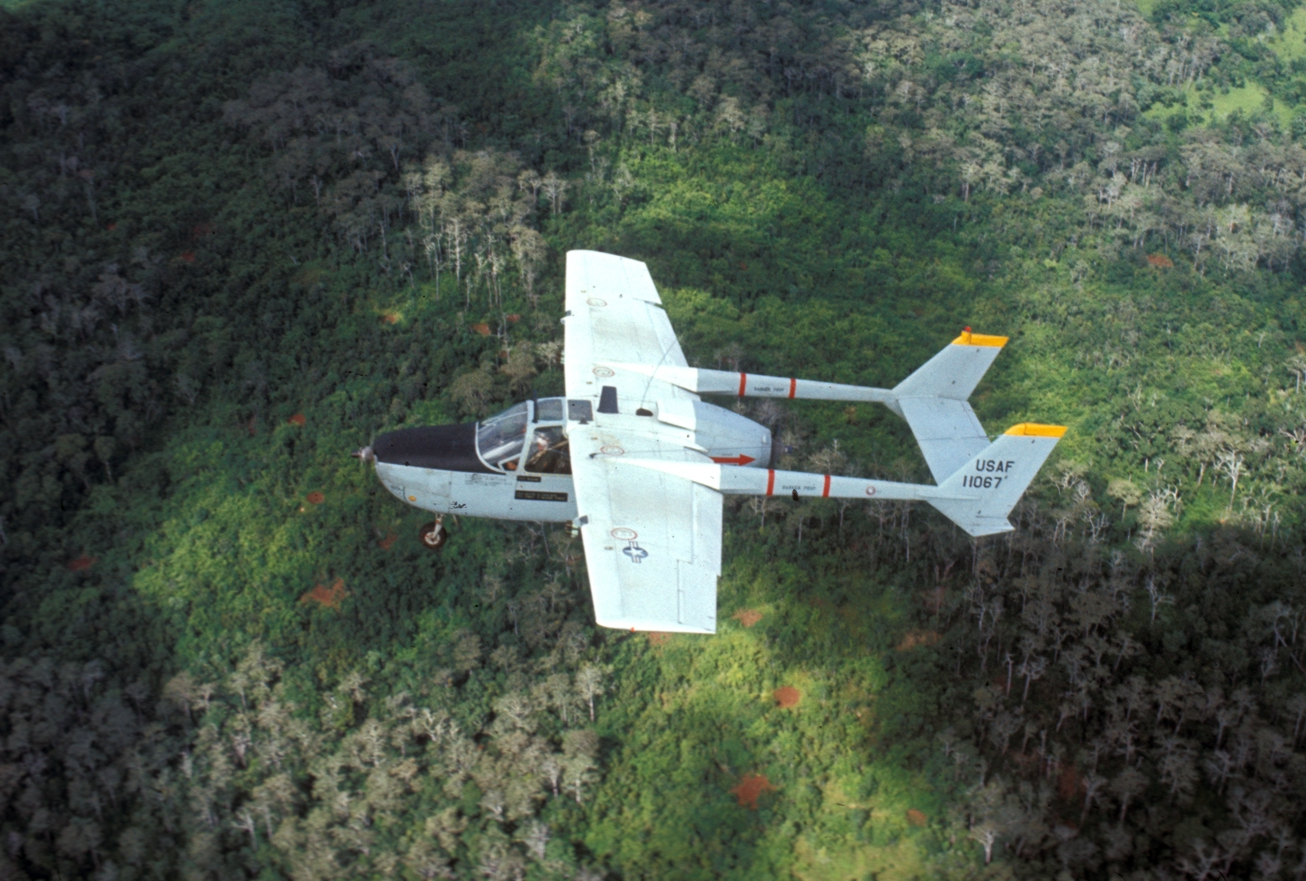
An O-2A over Laos, 1970.

The Raven FACs were stationed throughout Laos. Two of their Air Operations Centers (AOCs) were in northern Laos, at Luang Prabang and Long Tieng. Two more AOCs edged the Ho Chi Minh Trail, at Pakxe and Savannakhet. A fifth AOC was located at Vientiane. Simultaneously, beginning in March 1966, TACAN units began to be emplaced within Laos.

Lima Site 85 was sited on Phou Pha Thi, Laos, in the Annamese Cordillera with its beamed pointing over the nearby border at Hanoi. It would be overrun in March 1968.

Unlike the other bombing campaigns in Southeast Asia, the northern Laotian bombing campaigns within Barrel Roll would support a guerrilla force in action. U.S. Air Force and Royal Lao Air Force (RLAF) tactical air sorties directed by forward air controllers cleared the way for CIA-sponsored guerrillas commanded by General Vang Pao in their battle for the Plain of Jars. Among these campaigns were Operation Pigfat, Operation Raindance, Operation Off Balance, and Operation About Face. Joining the Ravens in this endeavor were the "Tiger" Fast FACs.

==== Ho Chi Minh Trail ====
===== In the beginning =====
The Ho Chi Minh Trail—Vietnamese name Trường Sơn trail—consisted of a network of roads and transshipment points concealed by the jungle. It eventually developed into an intricate system of over 3,000 miles of interweaving roadways, trails, and truck parks running down the eastern edge of the Vietnamese/Laotian border. Although located in Laos, the materiel shipped along the Trail supplied the communist troops in South Vietnam. Associated with it were other roads running through Dien Bien Phu to Xam Neua and further into northern Laos. FAC reconnaissance patrols over the Ho Chi Minh Trail in southern Laos began in May 1964, even as the Trail network began massive expansion. It became apparent that victory for the North Vietnamese war effort depended on keeping the Trail open. As noted above, the Operation Steel Tiger interdiction campaign began 3 April 1965.

The communist counter to daytime air strikes was a switch to night movement of supplies. O-1 Bird Dogs were originally tried for night FAC operations to interdict those shipments. Inadequate instrumentation and a small load of target markers so handicapped it that other aircraft came into use in the role.

In July 1966, A-26 Invaders using the call sign "Nimrod" began night operations against the Ho Chi Minh Trail with support from multi-engine flareships. Though principally a strike aircraft, it served as a FAC on occasion. Also in 1966, the U.S. Air Force began experimenting with various night vision devices for FAC use, under the code name Operation Shed Light.

===== Advent of sensor intelligence =====
The Starlight Scope became a key tool for night FAC operations. Originally it was tried mounted in the O-2 Skymaster. By late 1966, the scope was being used for FACing along the southern Ho Chi Minh Trail from C-130 Hercules flareships under the call sign "Blind Bat". These FACs worked in conjunction with O-2s; after "Blind Bat" illuminated an area with a flare, the O-2 would mark the actual target. Strike aircraft were variously T-28 Trojans, A-1 Skyraiders, A-26 Invaders, or later in the war—A-37 Dragonflies or F-4 Phantoms. C-123 Providers of the 606th Special Operations Squadron, under the call sign "Candlestick", filled a similar role over the northern end of the Trail. From September to December 1967, a prototype AC-130 gunship tested various detection sensors' ability to locate trucks. The new gunship mounted improved night vision capabilities, an infrared detection unit, an array of radars, and a searchlight. The latter could be filtered to produce infrared or ultraviolet beams, as well as ordinary light. An ignition detector would be added later, to pinpoint the running engines of supply trucks.

Testing of the sensors later incorporated into the Igloo White military intelligence system began in December 1967. At that time, FAC reconnaissance found five to ten times as many trucks as the prior December; as many as 250 trucks were spotted in single convoys, risking air strikes by running with lights on. However, the Battle of Khe Sanh sidetracked sensor usage from the Ho Chi Minh Trail to track the communists besieging the U.S. Marines in the embattled fire base. This distraction undercut a full testing of "people sensors"; as a result, the USAF favored the tested sensors, which detected trucks. In January 1968, four A-1 Skyraiders modified to carry two low-light-level television cameras were assigned to Nakhon Phanom Royal Thai Air Base. By February, they were flying test missions into Steel Tiger to direct strikes against trucks on the Trail. However, proper testing depended on flying a straight level course while not exposed to ground fire. The Ho Chi Minh Trail offered little chance of that. The sensor test was moved to South Vietnam.

===== The war on trucks =====
On 1 November 1968, President Lyndon Baines Johnson declared a halt to bombing in North Vietnam, thus suspending Operation Rolling Thunder. Immediately, with North Vietnamese targets off limits, the air power directed at the Ho Chi Minh Trail nearly quintupled, rising from 140 to 620 sorties per day. Operation Commando Hunt would concentrate on destroying so many communist supply trucks that the insurgency in the south would collapse from lack of supplies.

Communist anti-aircraft weaponry, freed from defense duties by the bombing halt, also moved south to the Trail. At November 1968's end, U.S. intelligence estimated there were 166 anti-aircraft guns defending the Trail. Five months later, by the end of April 1969, 621 anti-aircraft guns had been reported. Although no fire control radar was detected, the optically aimed weaponry was still a potent force. Some few 57mm guns could reach an aircraft at 12,500 feet altitude. Over half of the guns sited along the Trail were 37mm cannons, which could range up to 8,200 feet altitude. Dual mounted 23mm guns constituted most of the other artillery; they had a range of 5,000 feet. Underlying the anti-aircraft artillery, a plethora of machine guns fired at lower level fliers. Compounding the FAC's difficulties, the communists had more prepared sites than antiaircraft guns, and could quickly shift guns from one site to another. They also set up decoy sites of dummy guns. By mid-1969, American strike pilots noted increased effectiveness in antiaircraft defense due to the influx of experienced gunners. By the end of 1969, the growing hazards of enemy anti-aircraft fire caused the withdrawal of the "Candlesticks" from the Trail.

In early 1970, the Paveway system came into action; it required the FAC use of a laser designator to guide so-called "smart bombs". Differing designators were mounted on both AC-130 Blindbats and F-4 Phantoms; both were used successfully. In June 1970, the era of flareship FACs ended, as the "Blindbats" were withdrawn. The Martin B-57 Canberras of Operation Tropic Moon superseded them. However, the B-57 had its success limited by its high fuel consumption and substandard sensors. The fixed-wing gunships working the Trail became the principal truck busters in Operation Commando Hunt. The AC-119s would prove marginal in performance, and too vulnerable to ground fire to continue campaigning against trucks on the Trail. However, the AC-130 would become the American's premier weapon against supply convoys.

===== Campaign results =====
Between November 1970 and May 1971, the 12 AC-130 Spectres of the 16th Special Operations Squadron (SOS) were credited with destroying 10,319 enemy trucks and damaging 2,733 others. When these spectacular results were added to those of other units interdicting the Trail, it became apparent that if the damage assessments were correct, the North Vietnamese were out of usable trucks. Continuing steady traffic on the Trail mocked that assumption.

At the time, the 16th SOS had developed its own damage assessment criteria, given that visual observation of strike results was infrequent. According to the 16th:

- A vehicle that exploded and/or caught on fire was considered destroyed;
- A vehicle hit by a 40mm shell was considered destroyed;
- If a 40mm shell exploded within 10 feet of a vehicle, it was reported damaged;
- A vehicle hit by 20mm fire was considered damaged.

According to Vietnam Magazine, on 12 May 1971, these criteria were tested with a staged firepower demonstration by an AC-130, directed against eight targeted trucks on a bombing range near Bien Hoa AB. By applying the criteria, these eight test targets would have been reported as five destroyed, three damaged. In actuality, a ground check proved only two trucks destroyed. Five more trucks were operable after repair. One that would have been reported destroyed under the criteria was still drivable. Unexploded 20mm shells littered the ground, surrounding the trucks. As a result of this test, the damage criteria were changed to report only exploding or burning trucks as destroyed.

== Notable Forward Air Controllers ==
- Steven L. Bennett: Medal of Honor recipient
- Hilliard A. Wilbanks: Medal of Honor recipient
- Craig W. Duehring: Assistant Secretary of the Air Force in later years
- George Everette "Bud" Day: Medal of Honor recipient
- Garry Gordon Cooper: Only US foreign national recipient of USAF Air Force Cross
- Bill Jankoswki, Lyle Wilson, Rick Atchison, Richard Abbott, Gary Ferentchak, Dennis Constant, Rocky Smith, William J. Henderson, Mark Clark, Harold Icke, Larry F. Potts: Participated in the rescue of Iceal Hambleton in 1972, the largest, longest, and most complex search and rescue operation of the Vietnam War.

== Legacy ==
By the time Igloo White ended, it had cost in excess of two billion dollars in equipment costs, excluding the cost of lost aircraft. Operating expenses doubled that. Despite the expense, Igloo White's emphasis on interdicting supply trucks instead of enemy troops failed to deter continuing communist offensives in South Vietnam.

The Vietnam War saw about 13 million tons of bombs dropped by the U.S. and its allies. This was approximately six times the tonnage dropped during World War II. However, unlike World War II, there was no mass dumping of ordnance on cities full of civilians. Instead, in close air support—and in many interdiction situations—forward air controllers were charged with following stringent Rules of Engagement in directing air strikes.

The expertise went to little avail. When Raven FAC Greg Wilson called The Pentagon for a post-Laos assignment as a fighter pilot, he was told, "We're trying to purge the Vietnam FAC experience from the fighter corps because we have moved into an era of air combat where the low-threat, low speed, close air support you did in Southeast Asia is no longer valid. And we don't want these habits or these memories in our fighter force." This was symbolic of what was to come. Once again the United States Air Force abandoned forward air control at the war's end, just as it had following World War II and after the Korean War.

== See also ==
- Raven Forward Air Controllers
- 19th Tactical Air Support Squadron
- 20th Tactical Air Support Squadron
- 21st Tactical Air Support Squadron
- 22nd Tactical Air Support Squadron
- 23rd Tactical Air Support Squadron
- Rescue of Bat 21 Bravo
