= Black dot =

Black dot may refer to:

- Black dot (disease) of potato, caused by Colletotrichum coccodes
- A term used in rugby union or rugby league (see Glossary of rugby union terms and Glossary of rugby league terms)
- A black dot used to replace profile images in protest on Facebook and WhatsApp, in relation to the 2012 Delhi gang rape case

== See also ==
- Black spot (disambiguation)
