= Black Market Music =

Black Market Music may refer to:

- Black Market Music (album), a 2000 album by Placebo
- Black Market Music (record label), an Australian blues and roots-music label

== See also ==
- Black Market (disambiguation)
