= Gabe Camarillo =

American attorney and government official (born 1976)

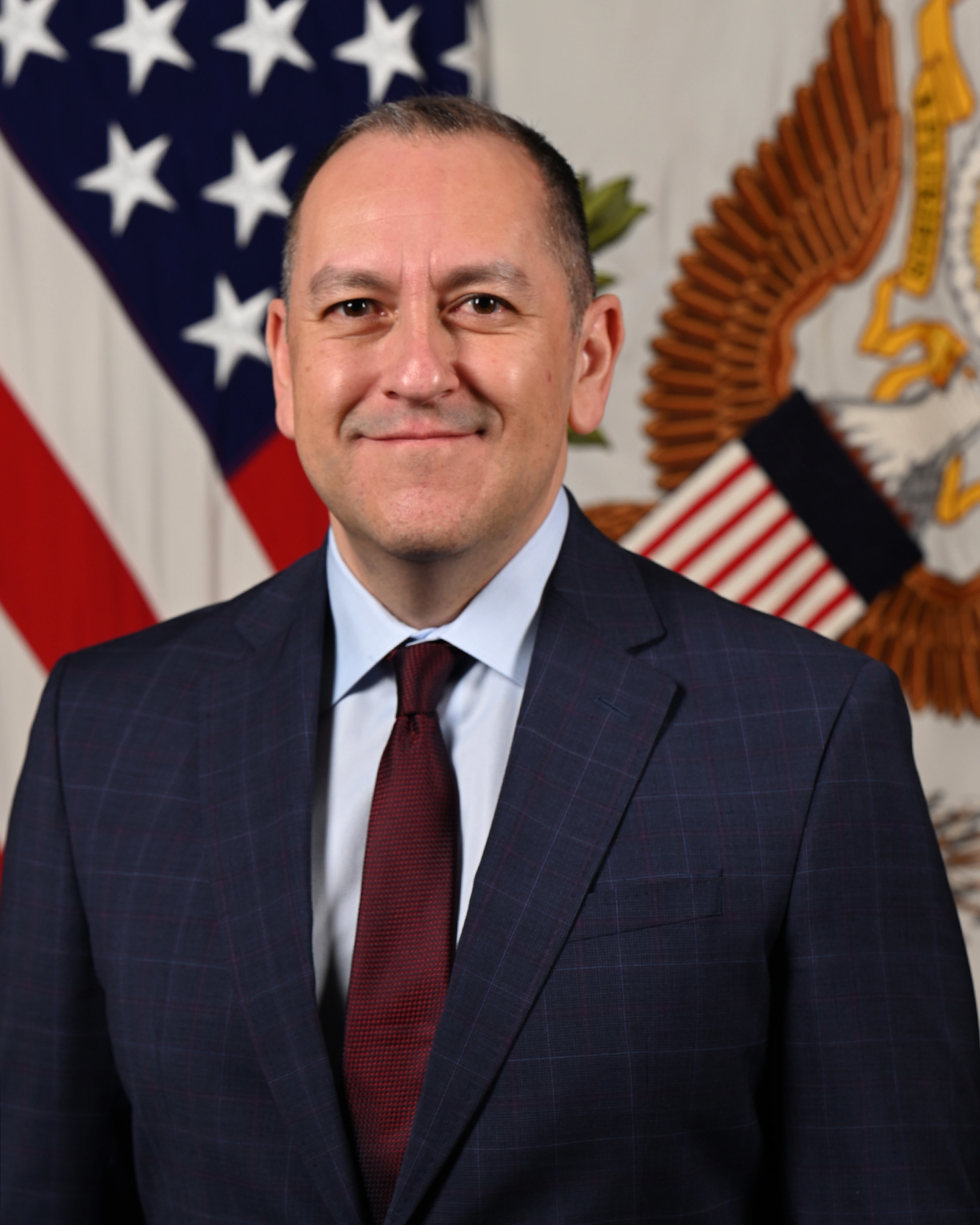
- Camarillo in 2022

35th United States Under Secretary of the Army
- In office February 8, 2022 – January 20, 2025
- President: Joe Biden
- Preceded by: James E. McPherson
- Succeeded by: Michael Obadal

Assistant Secretary of the Air Force for Manpower and Reserve Affairs
- In office December 15, 2015 – January 22, 2017
- President: Barack Obama
- Preceded by: Daniel B. Ginsberg
- Succeeded by: Shon J. Manasco

Personal details
- Born: Gabriel Omar Camarillo; August 25, 1976 (age 50) El Paso, Texas
- Education: Georgetown University (BA); Stanford University (JD)

Gabriel Omar Camarillo (born August 25, 1976) is an American attorney who has served as the 35th under secretary of the Army in the Biden administration. He previously served as Assistant Secretary of the Air Force (Manpower & Reserve Affairs) from 2015 to 2017 during the Obama administration.

== Early life and education ==
Camarillo was born and raised in El Paso, Texas and graduated from J. M. Hanks High School in 1994. He attended St. Mary's University for one year before transferring to Georgetown University. Camarillo earned a Bachelor of Arts degree from Georgetown in 1998 and a Juris Doctor from Stanford Law School in 2002.

== Career ==
In 1998 and 1999, Camarillo served as a legislative assistant for Congressman Cal Dooley (D-20-CA). After graduating from law school, he was a litigation associate at Akin Gump Strauss Hauer & Feld from 2002 to 2005. He was an associate at the Sutton Law Firm in San Francisco from 2004 to 2009 and at the Kaufman Legal Group in Los Angeles from 2009 to 2010. Camarillo joined the United States Army as a presidential appointee of the Obama administration in 2010, serving as a Special Assistant until 2012. From 2012 to 2016, he served as principal Deputy Assistant Secretary of the Army (Acquisition, Logistics & Technology). From December 15, 2015, to January 22, 2017, he served as Assistant Secretary of the Air Force (Manpower & Reserve Affairs). Camarillo then joined McKinsey & Company as a senior advisor. In 2017, he joined Science Applications International Corporation (SAIC) as Vice President of Strategy followed by assignment as Senior Vice President for Naval Sea and Air Systems in SAIC's Defense Systems Group.

Camarillo was nominated by the Biden administration for United States Under Secretary of the Army in July 2021. He was confirmed by voice vote on February 2, 2022.

In 2025, he initially joined KBR as Senior Vice President of the Defense Technology Solutions Business Unit. In 2026, he moved to national security integrator, Peraton, as President of its defense sector and was elected as Vice Chair of the National Defense Industrial Association's (NDIA) Board of Directors.

Political offices
Preceded by Shon J. Manasco	Assistant Secretary of the Air Force for Manpower and Reserve Affairs; 2015–2017	Succeeded by Daniel B. Ginsberg
Preceded by Christopher Lowman; Acting	United States Under Secretary of the Army; 2022–2025	Succeeded by Michael Obadal
Order of precedence
Preceded by Gina Ortiz Jones as Under Secretary of the Air Force	Order of precedence of the United States as Under Secretary of the Army	Succeeded by Erik Raven as Under Secretary of the Navy
