= Craig W. Duehring =

American politician (born 1945)

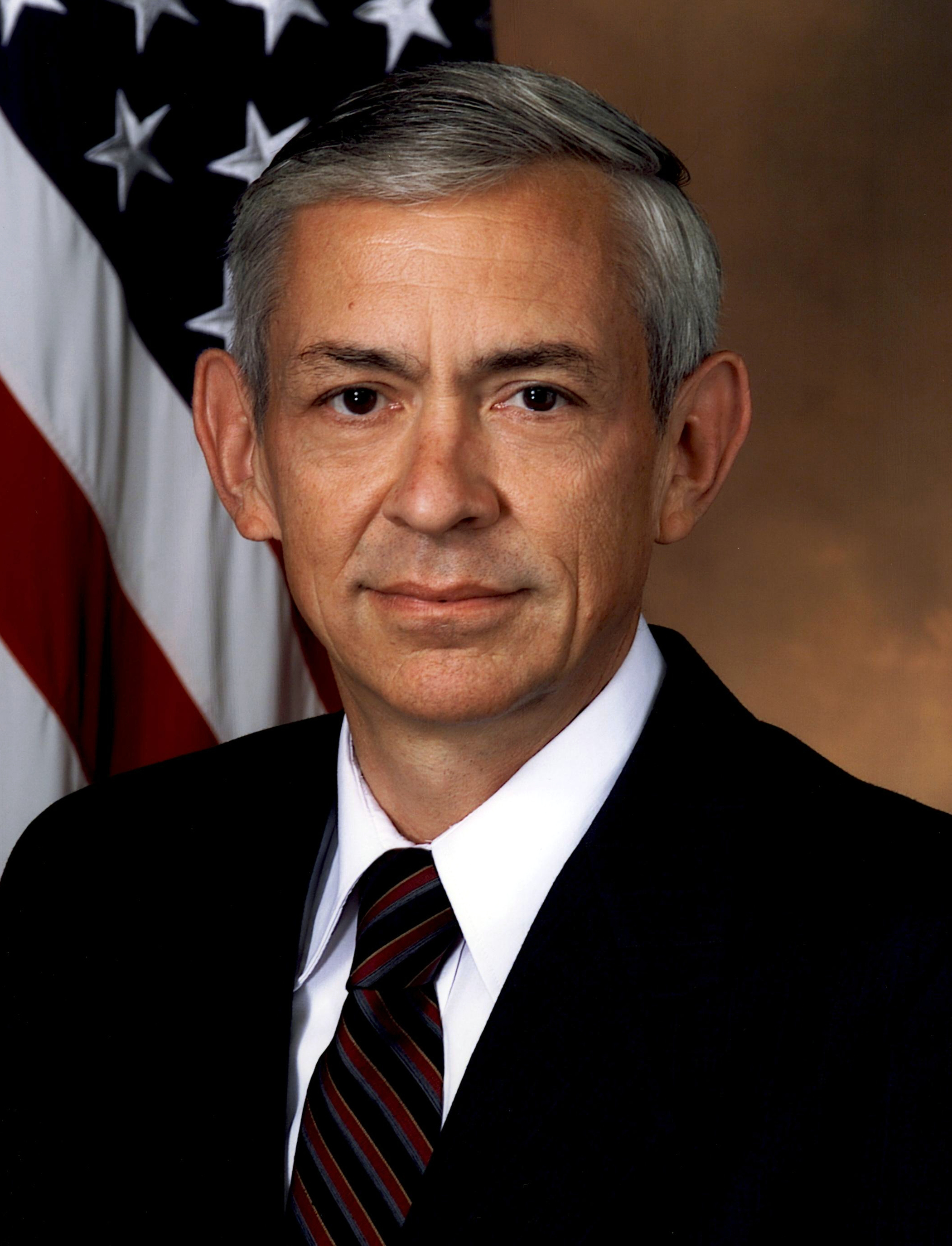

Assistant Secretary of the Air Force for Manpower and Reserve Affairs
- In office December 22, 2007 – April 30, 2009
- President: George W. Bush; Barack Obama
- Preceded by: Michael L. Dominguez
- Succeeded by: Daniel B. Ginsberg

Personal details
- Born: April 25, 1945
- Education: Minnesota State University, Mankato (BA)

Craig William Duehring (born April 25, 1945 in Mankato, Minnesota) was United States Assistant Secretary of the Air Force (Manpower & Reserve Affairs) from 2007 to 2009.

== Biography ==
Craig Duehring was educated at Minnesota State University, Mankato, receiving a B.A. in history and sociology in 1967. After college, he joined the United States Air Force. He spent 1968-69 completing undergraduate pilot training at Craig Air Force Base. Duehring saw service during the Vietnam War in 1969–70, as a forward air controller with the 22nd Tactical Air Support Squadron. He participated in over 800 combat missions, flying the Cessna O-1 and AT-28 over Vietnam and Laos. Duehring was awarded the Silver Star, two Distinguished Flying Crosses, 27 Air Medals and the Republic of Vietnam Gallantry Cross.

In 1970–71, he was a Raven Forward Air Controller based at Udorn Royal Thai Air Force Base. He then returned to Craig Air Force Base 1971–75, as a Cessna T-37 Tweet instructor pilot with the 43d Flying Training Squadron. He also earned a master's degree in counseling and guidance from Troy State University in 1975.

From 1975 to 1978, he was base fuels management officer with the 1st Fighter Wing at Langley Air Force Base. He was posted at RAF Bentwaters from 1978 to 1981, serving as Chief of Training of the 81st Training Wing. From 1981 to 1984, he was action officer of the Tactical Fighter Operations Division at the Headquarters of the United States Air Forces in Europe at Ramstein Air Base in West Germany. He returned to RAF Bentwaters in 1984, first as assistant operations officer of the 510th Fighter Squadron, then as Director of Operations Training for the 81st Training Wing. During his time in Europe, he recorded over 1200 flight hours in the A-10 Thunderbolt II.

He returned to West Germany in 1986, and was stationed at Nörvenich Air Base as American Community Commander and Commander of the 7502nd Munitions Support Squadron. In 1987, he received the Lance P. Sijan Leadership Award as the top leader in the USAF in the Senior Officer category. He was then Assistant Deputy Commander of Operations of the 406th Tactical Fighter Training Wing at Zaragoza Air Base from 1989–90, and Deputy Commander of Operations from 1990–91. He then spent 1992-93 studying at the Foreign Service Institute in Washington, D.C. From 1993 to 1995, he was United States Air Attaché to Indonesia. Duehring retired from the Air Force in 1996, having attained the rank of colonel.

In 1998 he was the unsuccessful Republican nominee for the United States House of Representatives for Minnesota's 2nd congressional district. In 1999, Duehring served as Executive Director of the Patrick Henry Center for Individual Liberty (founded by Gary Aldrich). During the 2000 U.S. presidential election campaign, he campaigned for George W. Bush, and was later a part of Bush's presidential transition team.

Duehring joined the United States Department of Defense, becoming Principal Deputy Assistant Secretary of Defense for Reserve Affairs. As there was no Assistant Secretary of Defense for Reserve Affairs from May 31, 2001 to October 9, 2002, Duehring was performing the duties of the assistant secretary in the period immediately following the September 11 attacks.

Following the resignation of Michael L. Dominguez as Assistant Secretary of the Air Force (Manpower & Reserve Affairs) in July 2006, Duehring became Acting Assistant Secretary of the Air Force (Manpower & Reserve Affairs) at that time. In November 2007, President of the United States George W. Bush nominated Duehring to be Assistant Secretary of the Air Force (Manpower & Reserve Affairs), and Duehring subsequently held this office until retiring from public service on April 30, 2009.

In July 2020, Duehring was nominated by President Donald Trump to be the Principal Deputy Under Secretary of Defense for Personnel and Readiness. On January 3, 2021, his nomination was returned to the President under Rule XXXI, Paragraph 6 of the United States Senate.

== Other ==
On September 1, 2010, Duehring was appointed by Governor Bob McDonnell as a member of the Board of Directors for the Virginia National Defense Industrial Authority. On April 12, 2014, he was inducted into the Minnesota Aviation Hall of Fame for 2014. In late 2014 he published The Lair of Raven an autobiographical account of his wartime service with the Raven Forward Air Controllers at Long Tieng, Laos.

== Personal ==
Duehring and his wife Theresa live in Fairfax Station, Virginia.

Duehring is the son of George William Duehring (March 13, 1910 – December 30, 1993) and Mercedes Rose (Lauterbach) Duehring (October 10, 1912 – February 13, 1990). The couple were married on October 11, 1941 and had four sons and a daughter.

== See also ==
- Forward air control during the Vietnam War

Government offices
Preceded by Michael L. Dominguez	Assistant Secretary of the Air Force (Manpower & Reserve Affairs); November 2007 – April 30, 2009	Succeeded by Daniel B. Ginsberg
