= Daniel B. Ginsberg =

American civil servant

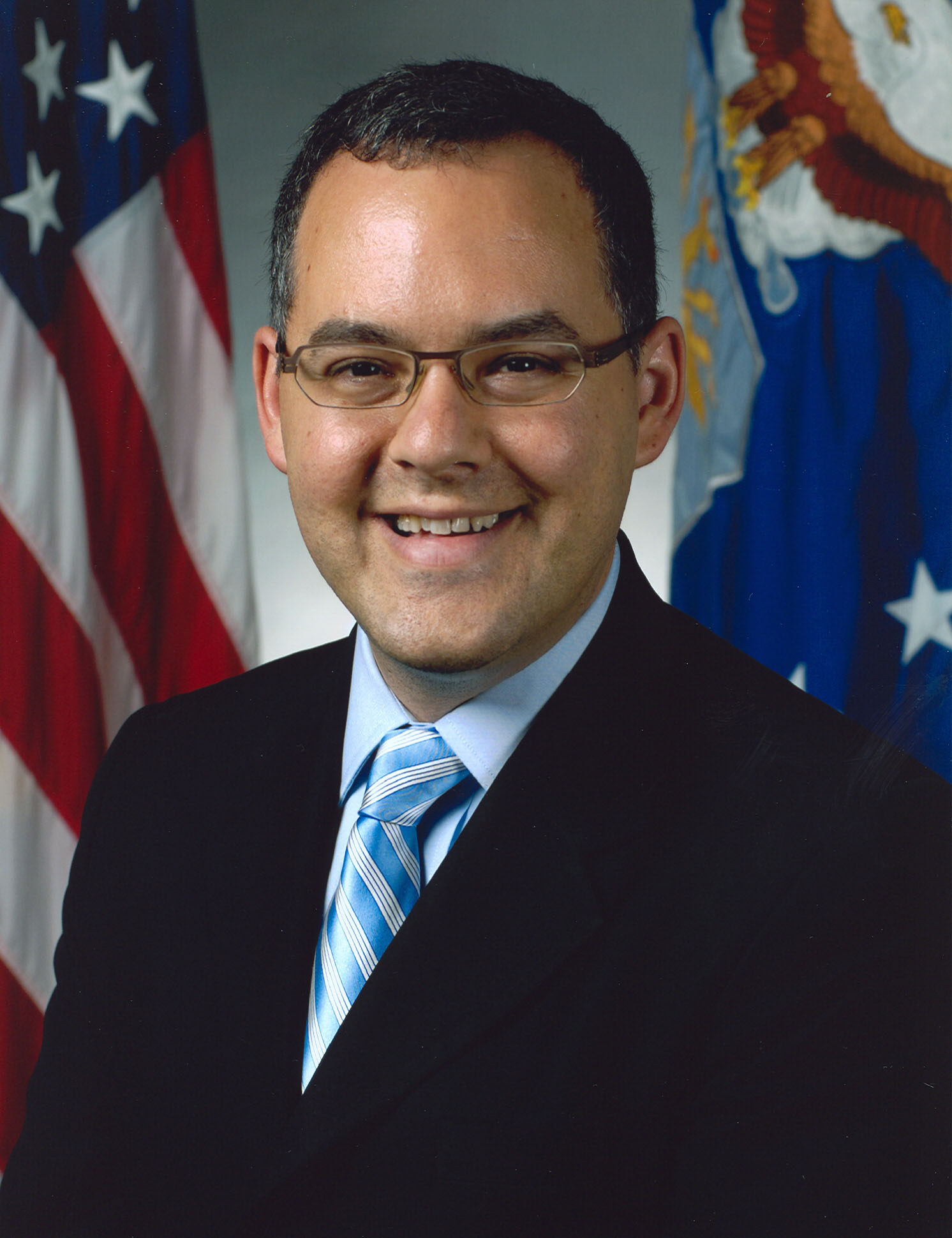

Assistant Secretary of the Air Force for Manpower and Reserve Affairs
- In office July 20, 2009 – December 31, 2013
- President: Barack Obama
- Preceded by: Craig W. Duehring
- Succeeded by: Gabe Camarillo

Personal details
- Born: March 13, 1974 (age 52)
- Education: University of Michigan (BA); Johns Hopkins University (MA)

Daniel Brian Ginsberg (born March 13, 1974) is a former United States Assistant Secretary of the Air Force (Manpower & Reserve Affairs), having held that office 2009 from 2013.

== Biography ==
Daniel Ginsberg was born in West Lafayette, Indiana and raised in Dunwoody, Georgia. He attended Dunwoody High School, graduating in 1992. Ginsberg was educated at the University of Michigan, receiving a B.A. in political science in December 1995. During his time in college, he was an intern in the office of Sen. Sam Nunn (D–Ga.) in Washington, D.C. from 1990 to 1992. He was a research assistant for Senator Nunn from 1993 to 1995. Later in 1995, he interned at the International Institute for Strategic Studies, studying at the London School of Economics during this period, and then at the United States Mission to NATO in Brussels. He then studied at the Paul H. Nitze School of Advanced International Studies at Johns Hopkins University, receiving an M.A. in strategic studies in 1998. During this period, he completed a fellowship at the Center for Strategic and Budgetary Assessments in 1998.

After completing his education, Ginsberg spent 1999 as a university fellow at the University of Chicago Political Science Department, and worked as a research fellow at RAND Corporation. In 2000, he became Defense Legislative Assistant in the Office of Sen. Patrick Leahy (D–Vt.). In 2007, he was promoted to Senator Leahy's Senior Defense Policy Adviser.

On May 12, 2009, President of the United States Barack Obama nominated Ginsberg to be Assistant Secretary of the Air Force (Manpower & Reserve Affairs), and Ginsberg assumed office following Senate confirmation.

In his spare time, Ginsberg is an amateur runner, running his marathon PR of 3:46 at the Washington, DC Rock'n'Roll Marathon in March 2018.

Ginsberg has been married to Jessica Rose of Westport, Connecticut since 2006.

Government offices
Preceded by Craig W. Duehring	Assistant Secretary of the Air Force (Manpower & Reserve Affairs); 2009 – 2013	Succeeded by Gabe Camarillo
