= Assistant Secretary of the Air Force (Manpower & Reserve Affairs) =

Civilian office in the U.S. Department of the Air Force

Assistant Secretary of the Air Force (Manpower and Reserve Affairs)
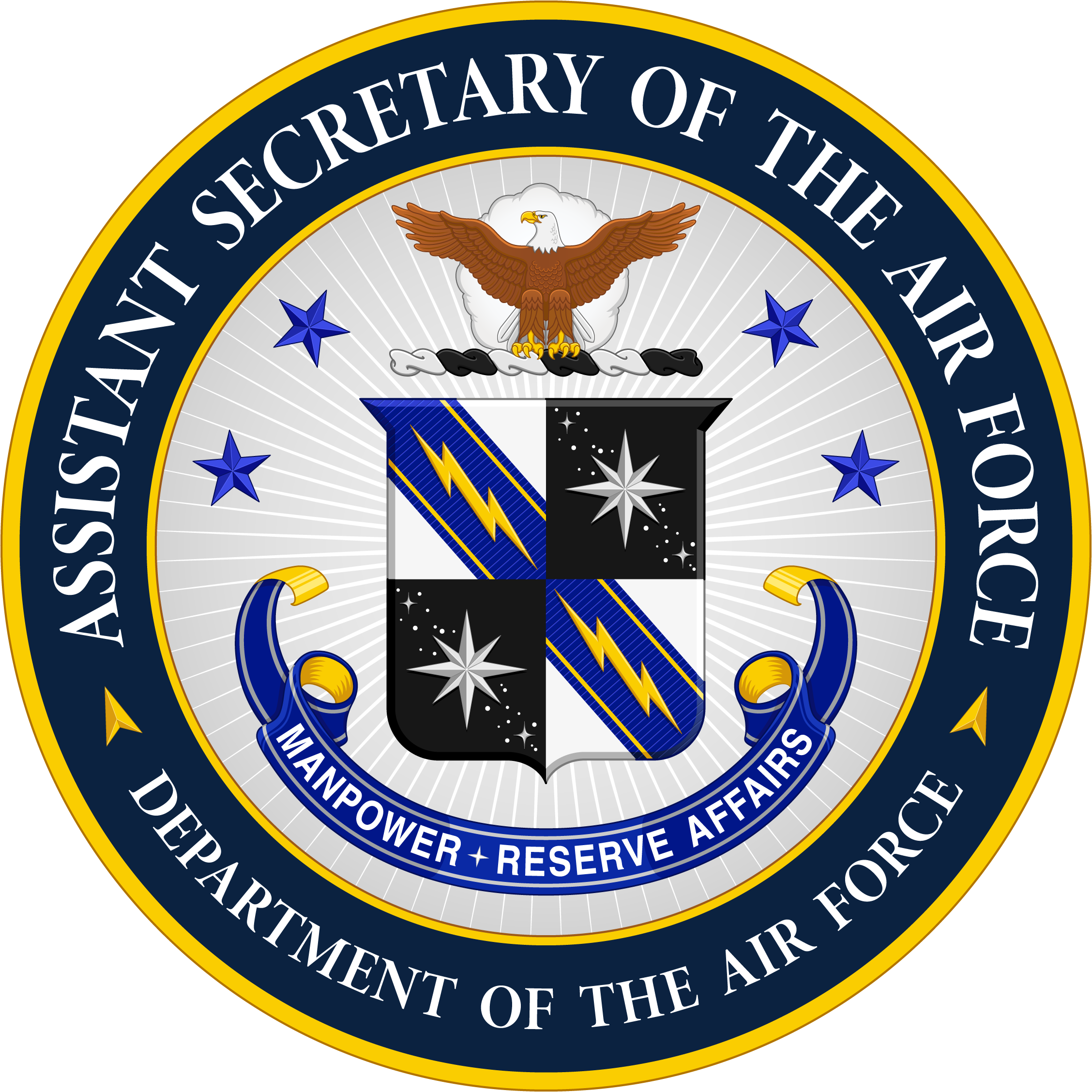
- Seal of the Assistant Secretary of the Air Force (Manpower and Reserve Affairs)

- Flag of an assistant secretary of the Air Force

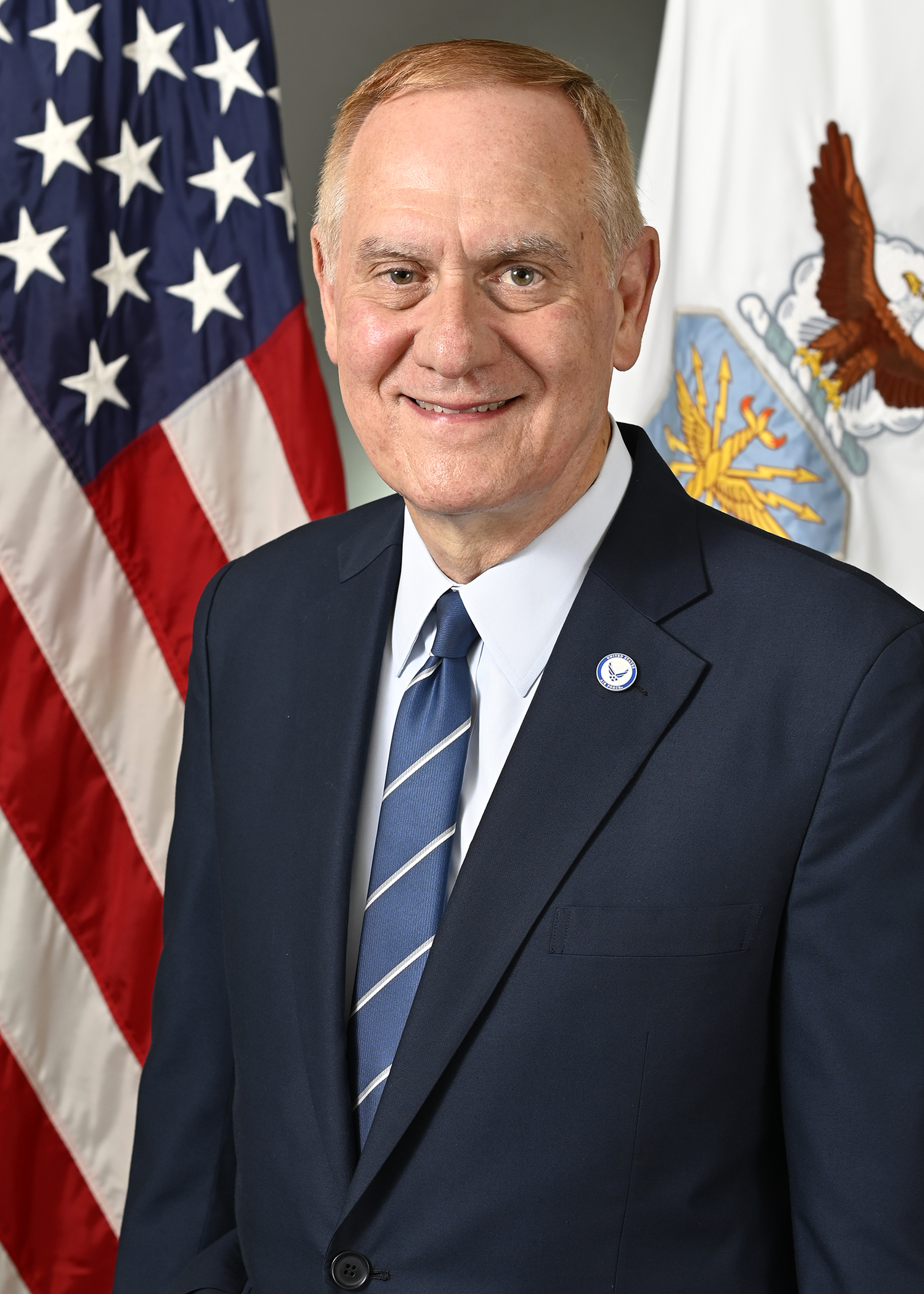
- Incumbent; Richard Anderson since September 22, 2025
- Department of the Air Force
- Style: Mr. Secretary; The Honorable (formal address in writing)
- Reports to: Secretary of the Air Force; Under Secretary of the Air Force
- Seat: The Pentagon, Arlington County, Virginia, United States
- Nominator: The president with Senate advice and consent
- Term length: No fixed term
- Constituting instrument: 10 U.S.C. § 9016
- Succession: 17th in SecDef succession by seniority of appointment
- Deputy: Principal Deputy Assistant Secretary of the Air Force for Manpower and Reserve Affairs
- Salary: Executive Schedule, Level IV
- Website: Air Force Senior Leaders

Assistant Secretary of the Air Force (Manpower and Reserve Affairs) (SAF/MR) is the title of a civilian office in the United States Department of the Air Force. Along with the four other assistant secretaries of the Air Force, the assistant secretary of the Air Force (manpower and reserve affairs) assists the secretary and the under secretary of the Air Force.

By law, the SAF/MR is "appointed by the president of the United States from civilian life with the advice and consent of the United States Senate". One of the assistant secretaries serves as assistant secretary of the air force (manpower and reserve affairs) and has "as his principal duty the overall supervision of manpower and reserve component affairs of the Department of the Air Force".

== List of assistant secretaries of the air force (manpower and reserve affairs) (incomplete list) ==
Picture	Name	Assumed office	Left office	President appointed by	Secretary served under
	Antonia Handler Chayes	1977	1979	Jimmy Carter	John Charles Stetson
	Tidal W. McCoy	1981	1988	Ronald Reagan	Verne Orr; Russell A. Rourke; Edward C. Aldridge, Jr.
	Karen R. Keesling	October 17, 1988	December 4, 1989	Ronald Reagan	Edward C. Aldridge, Jr.
	J. Gary Cooper	December 5, 1989	January 19, 1993	George H. W. Bush	Donald Rice
	Rodney A. Coleman	April 14, 1994	April 30, 1998	Bill Clinton	Sheila Widnall
	Ruby B. DeMesme	August 4, 1998	January 19, 2001	Bill Clinton	F. Whitten Peters
	Michael L. Dominguez	August 3, 2001	July 11, 2006	George W. Bush	James G. Roche; Michael Wynne
	Craig W. Duehring	December 22, 2007	April 30, 2009	George W. Bush; Barack Obama	Michael Wynne; Michael B. Donley
	Daniel B. Ginsberg	July 20, 2009	December 31, 2013	Barack Obama	Michael B. Donley
	Gabe Camarillo	December 15, 2015	January 22, 2017	Barack Obama	Deborah Lee James
	Shon J. Manasco	December 4, 2017	December 27, 2019	Donald Trump	Heather Wilson; Matthew Donovan (acting); Barbara Barrett
	John A. Fedrigo (acting)	December 27, 2019	June 10, 2022	Donald Trump; Joe Biden	Barbara Barrett; John P. Roth (acting); Frank Kendall III
	Alex Wagner	June 10, 2022	January 20, 2025	Joe Biden	Frank Kendall III
	Gwendolyn Defilippi (acting)	January 20, 2025	July 25, 2025	Donald Trump	Gary A. Ashworth (acting); Troy Meink
	Brian Scarlett (acting)	July 25, 2025	September 22, 2025	Donald Trump	Troy Meink
	Richard Anderson	September 22, 2025	Incumbent	Donald Trump	Troy Meink
