= Black mark =

Black mark or blackmark may refer to:

- Blackmark, 1971 Gil Kane graphic novel
- Black Mark Production, Swedish record production company
  - Under the Sign of the Black Mark, a 1987 album by Bathory, a seminal release on the label

== See also ==
- Black Spot (disambiguation)
- Black Market (disambiguation)
