= Black dot (disease) =

Fungal disease of the potato plant

Black dot or black dot disease is caused by the plant pathogen known as Colletotrichum coccodes (C. coccodes). It affects all underground parts of the potato, including the roots, tuber, and stolon. C. coccodes is also able to infect the stem and foliage of the potato plant. It can be introduced into an area by planting an infected tuber, and then spreading to other plants. A sign of black dot disease is black microsclerotia that are produced by the pathogen, and can be found on the roots, the tuber, the stems, and the leaves. This can be used to diagnose black dot. Symptoms of black dot disease include silvery lesions on the surface of the tuber, brown or black lesions on the leaves, leaf wilting, and chlorosis.

== Environment ==
Black dot disease can be seen in many of the places that grow potatoes around the world. In a lab cultured sample taken from black dot of potatoes, conidia grew best at 82.4 F and a pH of 6. High humidity and temperature are conducive to the inoculation of black dot. The disease is spread more quickly when there are many sclerotia in the soil, rather than when the foliage is inoculated by conidiospores. Conidia can be spread most readily by water and wind. Infection often occurs in early spring, but symptoms later in the growing season. Stressed plants are more susceptible to getting black dot than plants that are more healthy.

== Management ==
Spraying fungicides early on in the growing season, before the inoculation of black dot, can reduce the severity of the infection. If fungicide is applied later in the growing season, it has little to no effect on the disease. For fungicides to have a lasting effect, they must be sprayed multiple times. Cultural control is another way to manage black dot disease. This includes rotating non-host crops. The rotation needs to be fairly long (3–4 years), to allow for the survival structures (sclerotia) to die. Other control methods include using certified seed potatoes, planting in soil with relatively low moisture levels, and controlling the level of humidity and the temperature of stored tubers.
