= Black Market (2026 film) =

- Directed by: Fatimah Binta Gimsay
- Written by: Fatimah Binta Gimsay; Abdul Tijani-Ahmed
- Produced by: Nora Awolowo; Nicole Ofoegbu; Abdul Tijani-Ahmed; Omowunmi Dada
- Starring: Lateef Adedimeji; Linda Ejiofor-Suleiman; Scarlet Gomez; Omowunmi Dada; Teniola Aladese; Uzor Arukwe; Folagade Banks; Tomiwa Tegbe; Andrew Yaw Bunting; Susan Pwajok; Ibrahim Yekini
- Production companies: Rixel Studios; Signet Ring Studios; FilmOne Studios
- Distributed by: FilmOne
- Release date: 26 September 2026
- Country: Nigeria
- Language: English

Black Market is a 2026 Nigerian crime thriller directed by Fatimah Binta Gimsay and produced by Nora Awolowo. The film was screened at Tafawa Balewa Square in Lagos on 26 September 2026, where 51,258 people watched it at the same time, breaking the Guinness World Record for the largest attendance at a film's screening at the same location.

== Plot Summary ==
Black Market tells the story of five market women who engage in cross-border smuggling of goods during a period of fuel scarcity. Mesmerised by their success, a rival gang kidnaps one of their daughters, with the aim of engaging the women to smuggle successfully for the rival gang. The kidnapping soon shatters the women's organized operation and throws their lives into chaos. They are pulled out of their usual routine and forced into a frantic, dangerous game of deception and survival.

== Selected cast ==
- Lateef Adedimeji as Junior
- Linda Ejiofor-Suleiman as Zimuzo
- Omowunmi Dada as Adesua
- Scarlet Gomez as Aramide
- Teniola Aladese as Fae
- Susan Pwajok as Jumai
- Uzor Arukwe as Customs Officer

== Guinness World Record ==
The creators of the Black Market movie attempted to break the Guinness World Record for largest attendance at a film's screening at the same location, breaking the record which was previously held by Filipino film Felix Manalo, which recorded 43,624 viewers in 2015 at the Philippine Arena. Black Market surpassed the record with 51,258 viewers present at the movie screening. In attendance for the screening was Lagos State Deputy Governor Obafemi Hamzat and other dignitaries.

Omowunmi Dada, who was a cast of the movie and also an executive director expressed reason behind the idea to break the Guinness World Record, stating the idea was to create an experience that translates beyond the usual film premiere and instead building a broader cultural statement. President of Nigeria Bola Tinubu also congratulated the filmmakers, describing the success as further evidence of the talent driving Nigeria's creative industry.
