= Black Market Magazine =

American magazine

Black Market Magazine was a music, film, art and comic zine which existed between 1984 and 1996.

== History and profile ==
Based in San Diego, Black Market Magazine initially featured mostly reviews / interviews of punk rock and other alternative bands such as Samhain, The Cramps, D.O.A., Tex and the Horseheads, G.B.H., New Order, Christian Death, Bad Religion, Ramones, Murphy's Law, Butthole Surfers, Wasted Youth, Danzig, Marilyn Manson, etc... However over its 13 issue / 10-year lifespan, film and art would fill the majority of its pages. Interviews would now include sci-fi film historian / former editor of Famous Monsters of Filmland Forrest J. Ackerman along with actors and directors such as Bill Paxton, Adam Rifkin, Wayne Newton, Jeffrey Levy. Issues would also showcase artists such as R.K. Sloane, Jeff Gaither, Pizz, Lee Ellingson, Drew Elliot, Roman Dirge (Lenore Comix), GUF, Peter Bagge (Hate Comix), Michael Gilbert (Mr. Monster) and many others.

The edited and published by Carl Schneider of Black Market Productions.
