= Black spot disease (fish) =

Parasitic disease of fish

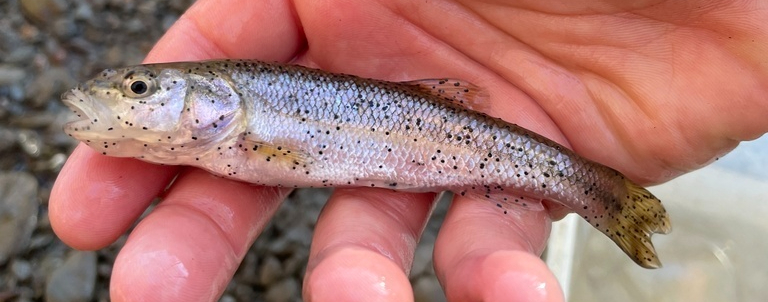
A creek chub with black spot disease

Black spot disease is a disease affecting fish. It is caused by larvae (metacercariae) of Diplostomatidae or Heterophyidae flatworms, which are encysted in the skin. It can affect both freshwater and marine fish. It appears as tiny black spots on the skin, fins, and flesh of the fish.

The life cycle of the parasite typically involves a fish-eating bird, a snail and a fish. The black spot larvae grow to sexual maturity in the infected bird's intestine. The adult worms pass eggs with the bird's droppings. When the eggs reach water, they hatch into free-swimming organisms which then penetrate snails for further development. Finally, after leaving the snails they burrow into the skin of fish and form a cyst. The fish surrounds the cyst with black pigment that gives the disease its name. If an infected fish is consumed by a bird, the cycle repeats itself.

The dormant encapsulated larvae associated with black spot disease do not appear to harm their fish hosts. Once the larvae are established in place, they do not cause any further physical damage, nor do they consume much energy. Some reports suggest that smaller fish, particularly juvenile fish, with extremely high numbers of cysts have less endurance and are more vulnerable to predators and warm-water stress. In very rare cases, a large number of cysts may form in the tissues above the eye, which can lead to blindness.
