= Operation Shed Light =

Part of the Vietnam War (1966–1972)

- Part of the Vietnam War
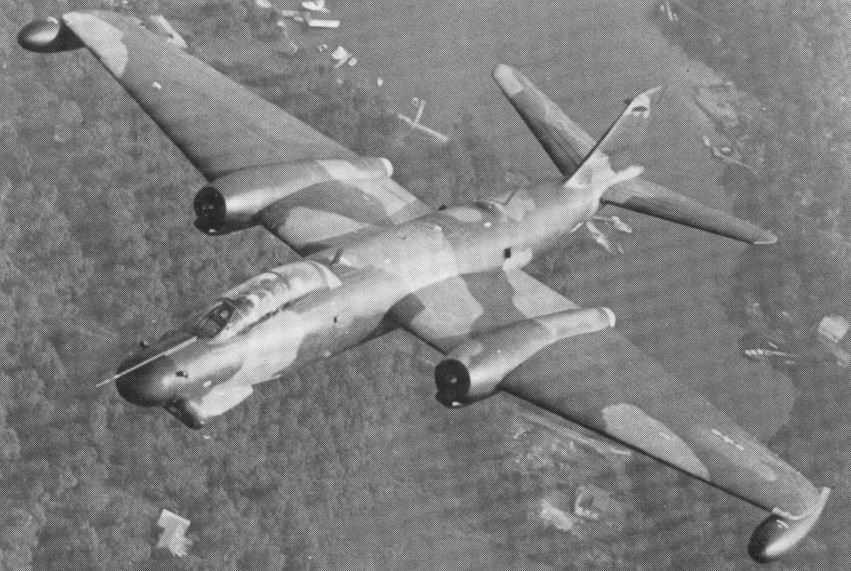
- Tropic Moon III B-57G aircraft with FLIR and LLLTV in nose
Date	7 February 1966 – May 1972 (removal of Tropic Moon III aircraft)
Location	South Vietnam, Cambodia, and Laos
Result	Crash night-attack capability development program with few applicable results.

Belligerents
United States; Thailand	North Vietnam

Operation Shed Light was a crash development project in aerial warfare, initiated in 1966 by the United States Air Force to increase the ability to accurately strike at night or in adverse weather. During the 1960s the United States military worked hard to interdict the movement of men and materiel along the Ho Chi Minh trail. The North Vietnamese were experts in the use of weather and darkness to conceal their movement and, understanding the superiority of American air power, put their skills immediately to good use. US forces seeking to impede the steady flow of supplies attempted to locate largely static targets during the day with poor results.

The United States Air Force, focused toward nuclear weapons and delivery of such munitions against static strategic targets, had spent little effort in expanding its tactical capabilities since the end of World War II. Operation Shed Light sought to rectify this by bringing together improved tactics and technology. The programs were subsequently centered on improved communication and navigation aids for all-weather and night flying; sensor equipment for seeing through clouds, foliage, and darkness; improved equipment and methods for target marking and battlefield illumination; and aircraft and tactics to utilize these developments. In the end, few of the programs would yield applicable results and most of the aircraft developed under its umbrella would largely fall into obscurity. The most applicable developments were those that could be mainstreamed, such as the work done on navigation and communication and sensor equipment.

== Origins ==
The United States Air Force had largely redirected its efforts to the matter of strategic deterrence in the period between the Korean War and deployment to southeast Asia. As a result, it had few serious capabilities for the plethora of conventional missions that became readily apparent with the expanding US commitment to southeast Asia. Dedicated attack aircraft were virtually nonexistent, with the exception of the Korean War era A-1 Skyraider. The US Navy was still using the type at the time, and the US Air Force had itself been long interested in the type, with this further reinforced as a result of its advisory role in South Vietnam. The US supported Republic of Vietnam Air Force was in fact using it as their primary aircraft by 1965. These aircraft had directly replaced aging F8F Bearcats in 1962 and the decision was made in 1964 to transition to the type from the then standard T-28 Trojans.

As a result of the orientation toward nuclear war, tactical air strikes were flown almost exclusively by the US Air Force between 1964 and 1966 using a variety of fighter bombers intended initially for the delivery of small strategic and tactical nuclear weapons. These types included the F-100 Super Sabre, F-4 Phantom II, and even the F-105 Thunderchief. The F-100 had two fighter bomber variants in service at the time, the F-100C and F-100D, both of which were capable of carrying a nuclear store, and only the latter of which was primarily for use as a strike aircraft and not a fighter. The F-100C had largely been passed to the United States Air National Guard and by 1965 less than two hundred of the aircraft were capable of using cluster bombs or even the largely standard AIM-9 Sidewinder air-to-air missile. The F-104C, a fighter bomber version of another fighter, though capable of utilizing conventional air-to-ground stores, was intended as a nuclear weapon delivery platform. Only the F-4C and F-4D were available as a true multirole aircraft, and the F-4C had still been used firstly as a fighter when deployed to the theater. The only other major non-fighter type in use early on in the conflict was the B-57 Canberra. Strikes in Laos were even conducted for a time using the F-102 Delta Dagger, modified with infrared sensors, and using its internal rocket armament. These strikes proved largely fruitless and were quickly discontinued.

Realizing the need for more dedicated attack aircraft the Air Force combed its inventory and looked to invest in new types. It found itself with an odd selection of obsolete, new, and experimental aircraft, and grasped for immediate solutions. To try and coordinate this effort, a task force was established by Lt. General James Ferguson, then Deputy Chief of Staff for Research and Development. Dubbed Operation Shed Light, it began on 7 February 1966 as a means of coordinating a wide variety of technological and other projects and programs that were being pursued in order to improve the United States Air Force's night fighting capabilities. Outlined in the Task Force's charter as of April were the following:

1. Identify current equipment, techniques, and procedures being used by the USAF in Southeast Asia.
2. Identify planned modifications and new equipment being developed for Southeast Asia.
3. Survey exploratory, advanced development, and operational support projects having a potential application to the problem, indicating current programs or schedules.
4. Identify voids in our capabilities or efforts.
5. Recommend courses of action to improve and/or provide new attack capability in 1966, 1967, and the longer term.

In all, the Shed Light Task Force identified nine new weapon systems and seventy-seven research and development "tasks" in the first five months of operation. Over the next 5–10 years it hoped to have a fully functional "self-contained night attack aircraft," a single type that would meet the operational need and would be functionally useful in other similar situations.

== Initial programs ==
Shed Light's initial programs were broken down into a number of categories, the most important being communication and navigation systems, sensors, and illumination and target marking equipment. Also detailed were proposed aircraft modifications and tactics.

=== Communication and navigation ===
Issues of communication and navigation were identified under Shed Light. That air strikes could not be called in effectively and/or guided to the target reduced the effectiveness of air power overall. A variety of communication system improvements and navigational aids, including improvements to the Long-Range Navigation (LORAN) system (specifically LORAN-D) were incorporated into the Shed Light mission.

=== Sensors ===
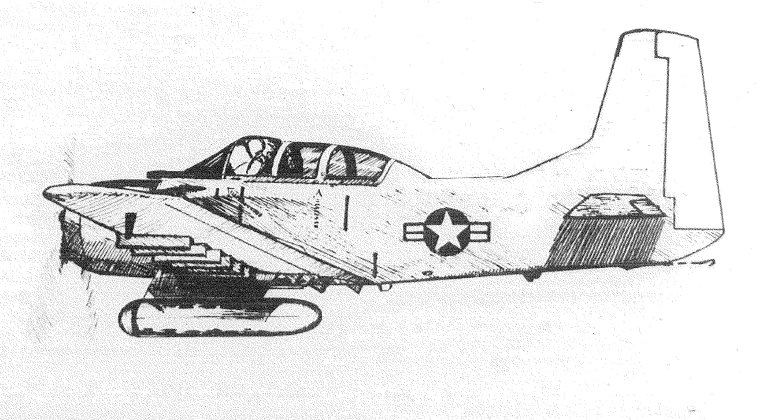
Artist's interpretation of an A-1E aircraft with podded LLLTV

Tropic Moon I Officers and Airmen, NKP Thailand, showing LLLTV pod on A-1E wing 1968

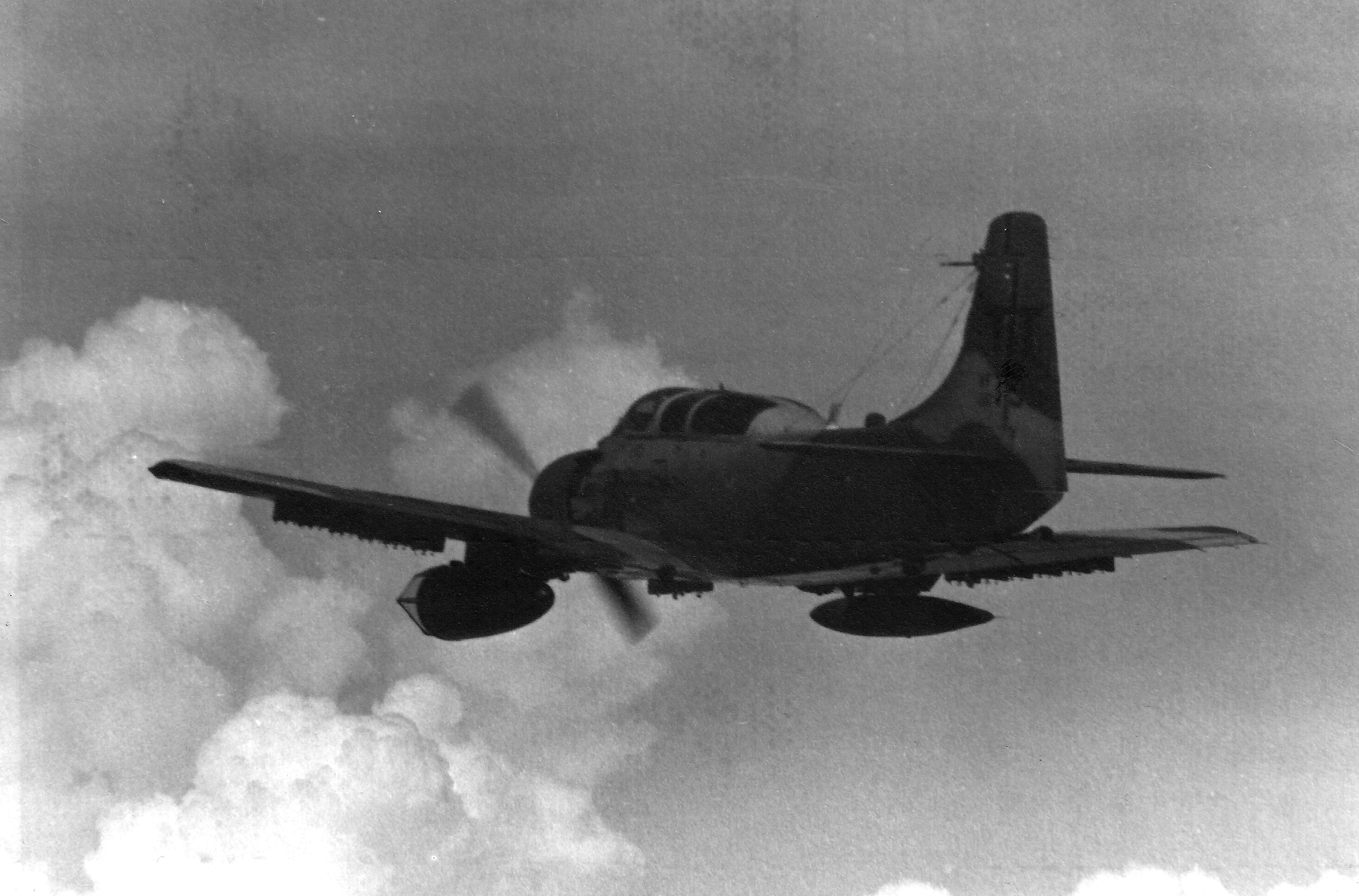
Tropic Moon I A-IE in flight with LLLTV pod on left wing

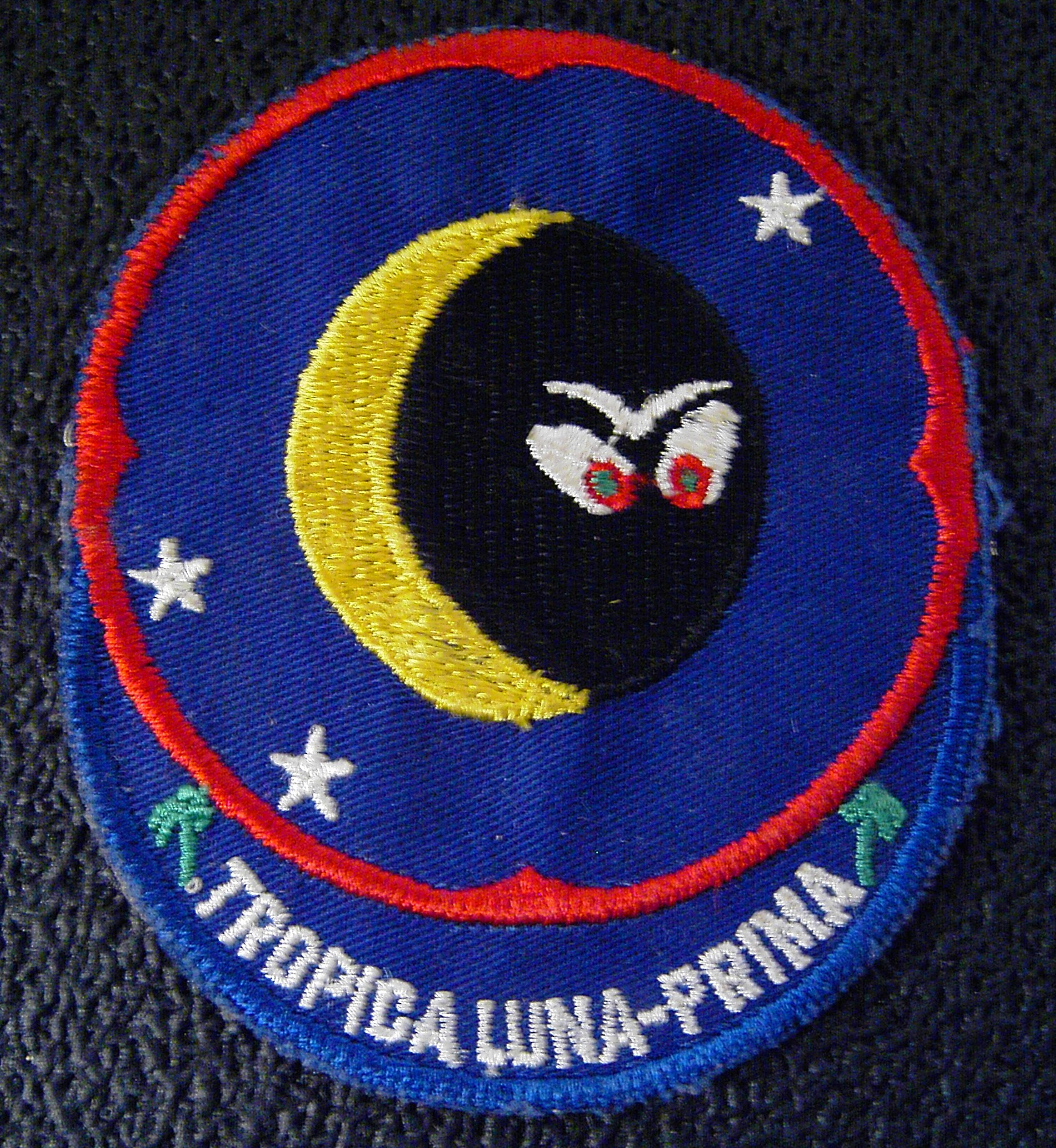
Shoulder patch worn by Tropic Moon I personnel

The sensors to be developed under Shed Light were broken into three categories, Low Light Level TV (LLLTV), Forward Looking Infrared (FLIR), and Forward Looking Radar (FLR).

Two LLLTV systems were in development initially. Both were podded, designed to be added to aircraft already in USAF inventory. The first, produced by Dalmo-Victor under Project 1533, was LLLTV only, but had provision for a laser range finder. It was intended for the A-1E Skyraider. The second, produced by Westinghouse under Project 698DF, contained both the LLLTV and a laser ranger finder. It was intended for either the A-1E or B-57 Canberra series. The second unit would eventually be fitted to the B-57B. The two programs were named projects Tropic Moon I and Tropic Moon II respectively. The Tropic Moon I system was essentially obsolete before it was deployed, and tests quickly confirmed this. Only 4 A-1Es were so equipped. The results from the Tropic Moon II B-57Bs were almost as discouraging, with 456 trucks detected on 182 sorties, for only 39 confirmed kills. Both systems were removed from the theatre by the end of 1968.

A prototype FLIR unit had been tested under Project Red Sea in a DC-3 at Eglin AFB, and later in an AC-47 in South Vietnam in September 1965. Using technology developed from those tests, Project Lonesome Tiger was initiated, testing a FLIR unit on two B-26 Invader aircraft. Climate was found to have serious effects on the units, especially humidity, and this fit was not to be put into widespread use. Improvised mounting of "starlight scope[s]" in the bomb bay of the B-26 is also mentioned in oral history reports, and this fit was found to be largely impractical.

=== Illumination equipment and target marking ===
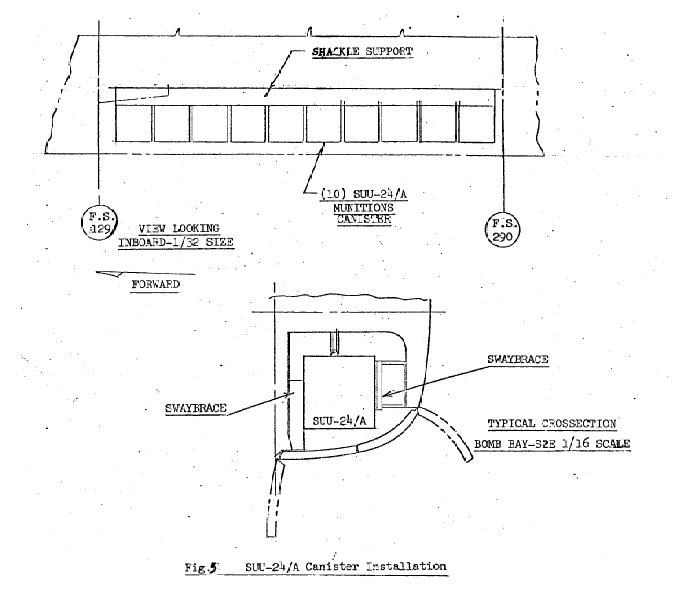
Schematic of proposed AS-2D bomb bay configuration

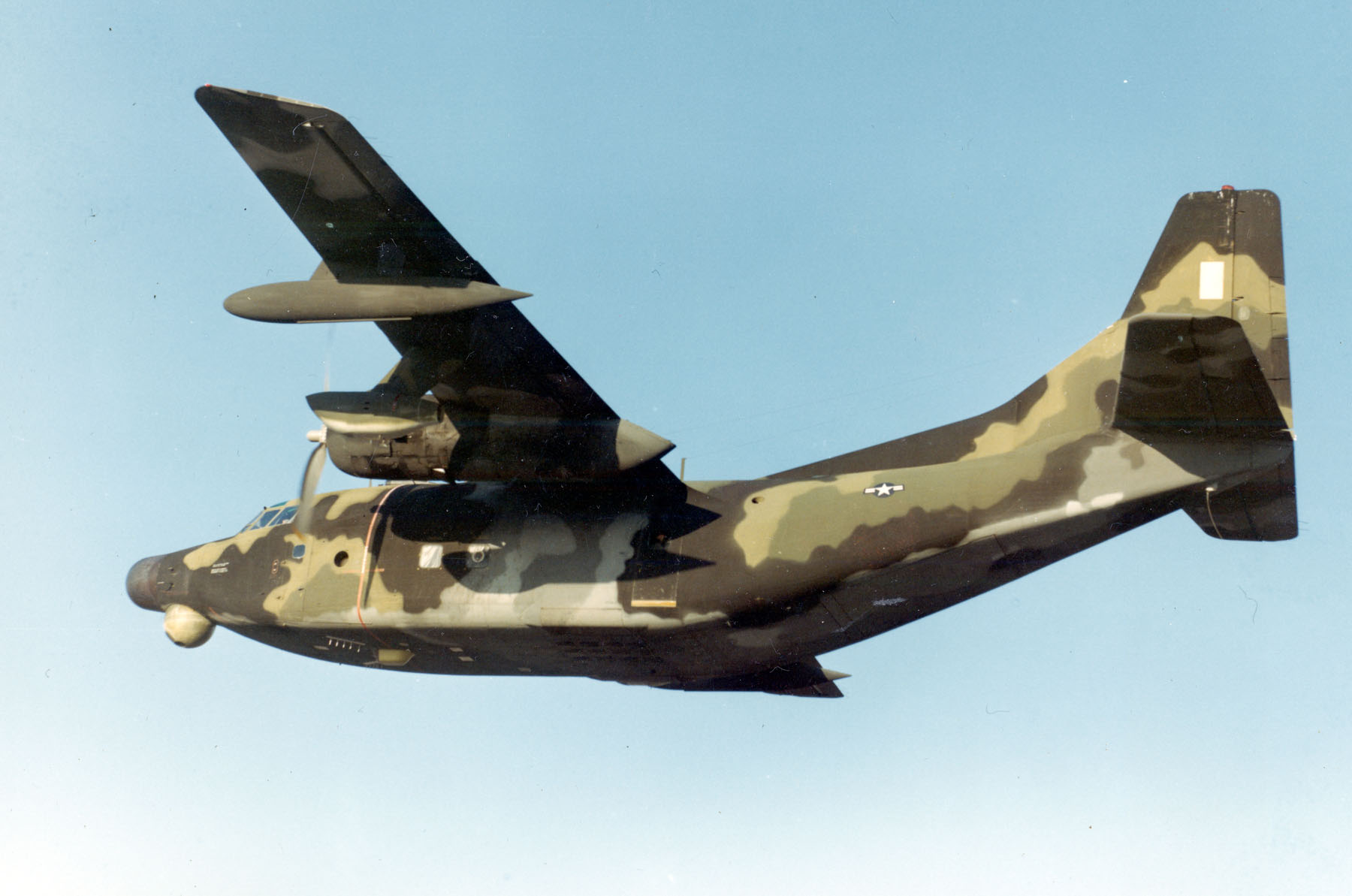
Black Spot NC/AC-123K in flight

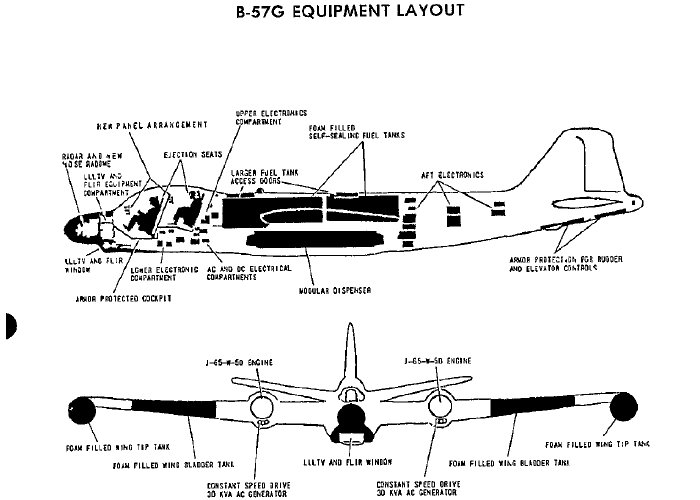
Layout of the Tropic Moon III B-57G aircraft

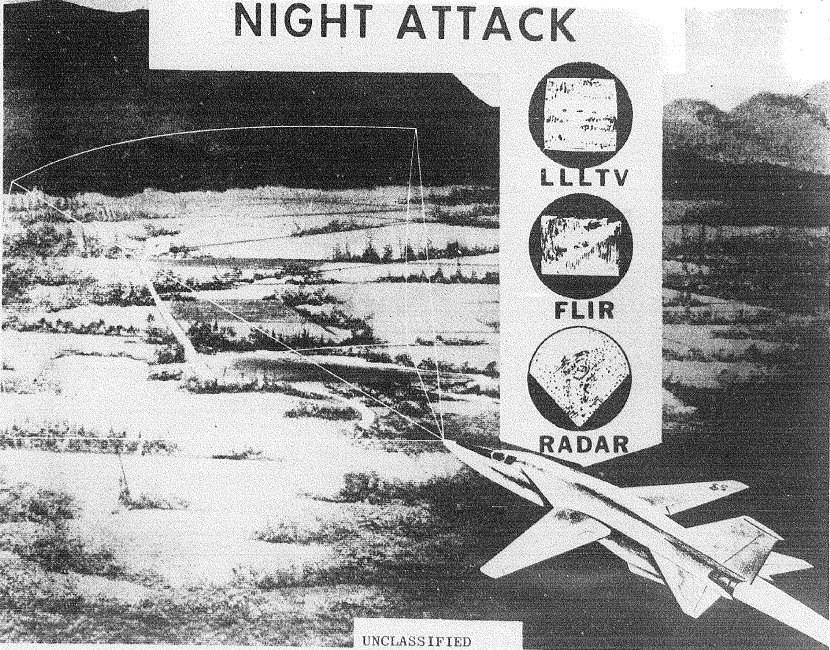
Artist's depiction of the F-111 SCNA

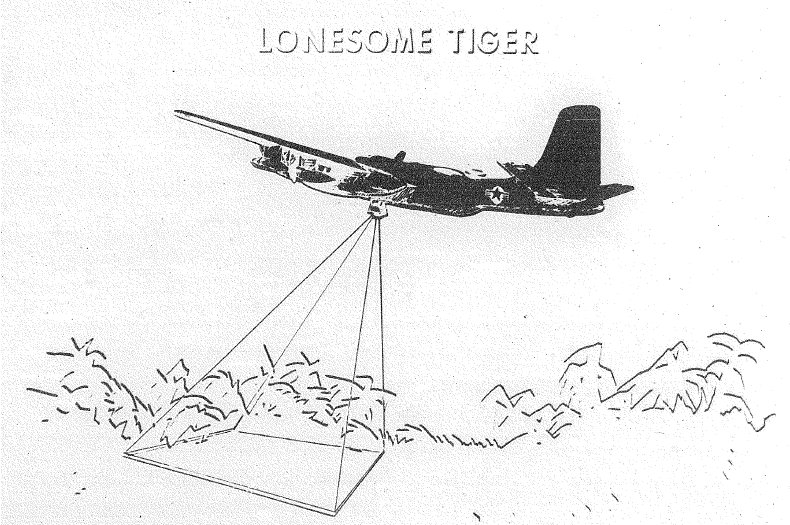
Artist's depiction of a B-26 with Lonesome Tiger FLIR

Battlefield illumination was of key importance within the original Shed Light programs. The dominant aerial flare at the time was the Mk 24 Mod 0, developed by the US Navy. Reliability of the units, however, were in question, as was availability. Perhaps of greater concern was existing test data in 1966 that suggested pilot disorientation and flare placement were serious issues. Project Night Owl, conducted in 1954, testing flares dropped from F-86 Sabre aircraft, led to twenty-five percent of pilots reporting experiencing some level of vertigo. Ironically, initial studies showed that in correcting this problem, issues of insufficient illumination were experienced.

A new flare, designated MLU-32/B99, also referred to as Briteye, was put into development. The new flare burned at 5 million candle power for over five minutes and produced a signal that could be heard by pilots indicating when it was about to burn out. Additionally, the Navy's Mk 33 Mod 0 flare warhead for the 5" Mk 16 "Zuni" rocket motor was tested under Shed Light. Projected delays in the procurement of the MLU-32/B99 led to a proposal to test the Swedish Lepus flare as an interim measure. The Lepus flare was tested, but found to be inferior to the MLU-32/B99.

The issues surrounding flares led to exploration of other methods of battlefield illumination. The Battlefield Illumination Airborne System or BIAS, employed two banks of Xenon ARC lamps (28 total) fitted to a modified C-123B aircraft. A cooling system was installed on the left side of the aircraft to help dissipate the heat generated. The system was deployed to Vietnam, but it was found that the lamps provided a perfect target for enemy gunners and the system was discontinued. Initially it had been proposed that a similar system be installed on the more capable C-130, but the experience during the operational trials brought the whole program to a halt.

More unorthodox methods were also explored. Astrosystems International developed a so-called "Quartz Chamber" which burned pure oxygen and aircraft fuel, converting the chemical energy into light. The system was planned to be evaluated within a year, and installed in a similar arrangement to the more conventional BIAS. A plan, codenamed Moonshine, was also put forward. Moonshine was to be a joint effort with NASA to determine the feasibility of a geosynchronous satellite that could project light directly down on any desired location.

Ground target marking, which was a key tactic for day time strikes, was investigated. Project 2531 was to investigate target marking munitions, and looked into warheads for the Mk 40 2.75" rocket motor, using a variety of chemiluminescent materials. These were to be loaded with compounds developed under the US Navy's Target Illumination and Recovery Aid (TIARA) program. Initially they used modified M151 high-explosive warheads, but found the amount of compound that could be contained provided poor results. The Shed Light Task Force noted that a lighter case for these compounds was in development. A combination of red phosphorus and a flare was investigated in an attempt to provide a system that could be used at night or during the day.

=== Aircraft and tactics ===
The key aircraft intended to be developed under Shed Light was to be a "Self Contained Night Attack" aircraft or SCNA. The SCNA would have "the necessary night sensors and weapon delivery capability to find and strike targets at night on the first pass without the use of visible artificial illumination."

However, to provide an interim capability, the idea of using a "Hunter-Killer" concept using aircraft capable of spotting targets at night and more or less unmodified conventional strike aircraft was proposed. This method had many identified disadvantages, including the need for specialized aircraft and capability differences between the hunter and the killer that might affect their combined operation. The need for specialized aircraft was further exposed by the fact that only three aircraft at all suitable for the hunter role were available to the US military in southeast Asia as of 1966. These included the Army's OV-1B Mohawk, and the USAF's RF-4C Phantom II and RB-57E Canberra aircraft. There were only two RB-57E aircraft in country at the time, under a special reconnaissance project codenamed Patricia Lynn, and the aircraft were essentially experimental. They also featured Reconofax VI FLIR units, which was an older technology than those being developed under Shed Light. The RF-4C had the benefit of being of a similar capability to strike aircraft at the time, and a modified hunter version, given a designation RF-4C(H) was to be developed, replacing the camera equipment with LLLTV, FLIR, and Side-Looking Radar (SLAR) units.

A three-phase program had been outlined as early as 1966 for development of the SCNA. The first would be a slower bomber or cargo aircraft, followed, by a jet aircraft of some type. The F-111 was originally slated to become the key SCNA aircraft. It was ultimately hoped it would incorporate the final versions of all three types of sensors (LLLTV, FLIR, and FLR) developed under the program. In the initial study, an "RF-111" was also supposed to be available in the 3–7-year time frame for use in the hunter-killer pairing. This time frame led the initial study report to propose using the OV-10 Bronco aircraft in the interim measure, but decided against it because of the inability of the OV-10 to carry all the desired sensor equipment. As it turned out that while the RF-111A did enter testing in December 1967, it was not easily convertible to and from the existing F-111A configuration. The Air Force looked for alternatives, but the revised RF-111D program was terminated because of a funding shortage in September 1969 and the RF-111A program was cut for good by March 1970.

With the decision not to use the OV-10 and the desire for an immediate capability, the USAF decided to investigate using the S-2 Tracker aircraft. The proposed aircraft would incorporate the three main sensors under development in a revised aircraft that provided operators for all major systems. The S-2's built-in search light was to be slaved to the LLLTV, crew protection would be provided, and the armament system would be primarily 10 SUU-24/A munitions dispensers in a revised bomb bay. Six wing hard points would be available for additional conventional munitions including bombs, rockets, cluster munitions and dispensers, and gun pods. The program package documentation suggests that the "XM-9" would be the primary under-wing store. The XM9 designation is the US Army designation for the SUU-7/A low-drag dispenser pod modified for use on the UH-1B/C Iroquois helicopter. The two planned pre-production aircraft were to be designated YAS-2D, while the production aircraft would have been AS-2D. Difficulties in funding, getting the aircraft from the US Navy, and delays in completing the modifications led the USAF to scrap the S-2 based SCNA in January 1968.

The F-111 would initially have a mixed record in Southeast Asia, when a detachment of six aircraft from the 474th Tactical Fighter Wing were deployed to Takhli RTAFB in Thailand, in early 1968, as part of Operation Combat Lancer. The remaining aircraft were returned to the United States in November after logging 55 missions, but at the cost of three F-111A's lost in combat. Eventually the aircraft redeemed itself when two squadrons (48 F-111As) from the 474th deployed to Takhli in September 1972, in order to participate in the aerial offensive against North Vietnam under Operation Linebacker II. During this deployment the F-111s operated day and night, in all weather conditions and without electronic countermeasures escort, and relied on less aerial refueling support than other tactical aircraft. Eventually over 4000 missions were logged by the two F-111-equipped units at the cost of six aircraft lost in combat and two lost to operational causes. However, by this point in time, the aircraft was no longer earmarked for conversion into the SCNA role.

== Black Spot ==
Perhaps the most radical of Shed Light's projects were two C-123K Provider aircraft modified in September 1965 under Project Black Spot. Black Spot had been in development prior to the establishment of the Shed Light Task Force, but were subsequently incorporated in under the wide reaching charter. With the scrapping of the AS-2D aircraft program in 1968, the Black Spot aircraft became the prime contenders for Shed Light's first phase.

The Black Spot aircraft were to fit under the "self-contained night attack capability" description and E-Systems of Greenville, Texas was contracted to complete the modifications. These aircraft featured the following sensors:

- Autonetics (A division of North American Aviation) R-132 forward looking radar (FLR) to locate targets for closer inspection via Low Light Level TV (LLLTV) and Forward Looking Infrared (FLIR), and featured a Moving Target Indicator (MTI) and automatic tracking capability.
- An Avco FLIR.
- Westinghouse LLLTV, with automatic tracking.
- A Westinghouse laser rangefinder.

The LLLTV system was described as having the highest resolution, and was to be the primary means of target location and engagement. The aircraft itself looked radically different visibly from its transport brethren, as the new equipment required lengthening the nose by over 50 inches (130 cm).

Also included was an armament system that could carry BLU-3/B (using the ADU-253/B adapter) or BLU-26/B (using the ADU-272/B adapter) bomblets, or CBU-68/Bs cluster bombs. Both the ADU-253A/B and ADU-272A/B are listed as being used in combat, with no mention of combat drops of CBU-68/Bs. In addition to the offensive armament, two hand-operated flare launchers were initially provided, until LAU-74/A automatic launchers could be supplied. Besides the automated nature of the LAU-74/A, the unit only required one loadmaster to operate it.

The two aircraft, serial numbers 54-691 and 54-698, were first designated NC-123K in 1968 and then redesignated AC-123K in 1969. These NC/AC-123Ks were first deployed operationally at Osan in South Korea between August and October 1968, and flying in support of operations against North Korean infiltrators approaching by boat. The operations in Korea met with a certain level of success and as a result the NC/AC-123Ks were transferred to South Vietnam in November 1968.

Once in South Vietnam the aircraft were engaged in missions against the transport of materiel along Ho Chi Minh Trail and in the Mekong Delta Region. The aircraft operated there until January 1969, when they were redeployed to Ubon RTAB, Thailand. Two missions a night were flown from Ubon with two A-1 escorts from Nakhon Phanom RTAB (often referred to simply as NKP) flying cover and providing additional firepower. Initial escort had been provided by F-4s, but the difference in speed and capabilities had made protecting the lower and slower flying NC/AC-123Ks difficult. The area of responsibility for the first six months was approximately 100 nautical miles (120 mi; 190 km) east-southeast from NKP. After that, the area of coverage was a river in southern Laos.

The two aircraft were returned to the United States, to Hurlburt Field, Florida in May 1969, where a second round of training occurred. Four crews attended a ground school in Greenville, Texas and returned to Hurlburt where they flew the aircraft for the first time. In October 1969, two crews flew the aircraft to a second deployment at Ubon. The other two crews arrived in early November. After attending jungle survival training at Clark AB in the Philippines missions over Laos commenced.

The final phases of the program are slightly unclear. Some sources have missions terminating in early July, 1970 and the aircraft flying to the "Bone Yard" at Davis-Monthan AFB where they were returned to C-123K standard, then returned to South Vietnam still wearing their camouflage and black undersides for transport duty. The description of the designation in the official documentation supports this, by saying that the NC-123K is "Similar to C-123K but partially demodified from AC-123K (modified to an attack configuration) to permit general cargo handling and troop movement."

However, the official history states that combat operations ceased 11 May 1969, with no mention of the second deployment. The second deployment is mentioned in associated documentation, but only as to when the aircraft were scheduled to arrive in Thailand, not when they departed. Also, the official aircraft records show both aircraft as transferred to Napier Field, Alabama, where they were still listed as an NC-123K as of December 1972. The purpose of this transfer is unclear. That the official history notes a "munitions accident" on 19 March 1969 in the chronology, but without any details as to the fate of aircraft or which aircraft was affected, adds additional confusion.

It is also suggested that the Black Spot aircraft were never intended to be used in combat. However, as of 1966, twenty production aircraft were planned, for a total cost of $64.7 million (equivalent to $476.4 million in 2024). There was even a recommendation that the C-130 Hercules be added to the program and used instead. These projected aircraft were referred to as a Black Spot II. After the Operation Trial and Evaluation, it was found that the aircraft were not suitably protected and survivable for protracted use in combat zones. No C-130 aircraft are known to have been converted to a Black Spot II standard.

== Tropic Moon III ==
Shed Light's Second phase eventually turned out to be based on the B-57. B-57 aircraft had already been deployed to southeast Asia and had been the subject of initial sensor evaluations under Tropic Moon II. Tropic Moon III was envisioned as an SCNA that made up for the gross shortcomings of Tropic Moon I and II.

Tropic Moon III involved a completely new set of systems, up to date, and infinitely more capable than those previously installed. An entire new aircraft sub-variant, the B-57G, was developed for the purpose with a redefined nose to house the new sensor package. Development of the aircraft experienced major delays during which it was equipped with a laser target designated to be used with the then new first-generation Pave Way laser-guided bombs.

In the end the Tropic Moon III proved to be a capable system, both with conventional ordnance and laser guided weapons, day and night. However, the advent of the side-firing gunship threatened the system. The B-57G conducted its first combat missions in October 1970 during Operation Commando Hunt V. The kill rates per sortie between the AC-130A/E and the B-57G made it clear which system was dominant in the role of "truck hunter," in reference to the primary targets of the campaign. During the course of the operation the B-57G's claimed over 2,000 trucks destroyed, mostly as a result of using precision guided weaponry. In the same period AC-130s were credited with destroying six times this number of trucks. While B-57G operations continued, this led to an attempt to modify the system to incorporate gunship elements. One B-57G was modified to house a special bomb bay installation of one Emerson TAT-161 turret with a single M61 20mm cannon as a gunship under Project Pave Gat. This system proved to still be inferior to the capabilities of the AC-130. In addition to their laser guided ordnance, Tropic Moon III B-57Gs also used a variety of conventional ordnance, including M36 incendiaries, cluster dispensers, and iron bombs. These other systems were used in light of a shortage of precision guided munitions available.

The B-57G was removed from the theatre in May 1972 coinciding with the withdrawal of the bulk of US Air Elements. Plans remained for the continuation of the B-57G program and there were proposals for multiple wings of aircraft to operate in concert with AC-130s and similar aircraft. Post-conflict spending cuts ended this.

== Other associated programs ==
Other programs were also associated with Shed Light, either coming under its wide-reaching charter, or otherwise being observed. Similar mission requirements meant other services were working on developing their own equipment, and the Shed Light Task Force was under orders from the start to survey all other development (see the original 1966 charter).

The US Army had been managing a piece of equipment referred to as S-202, which combined four IR cameras, a display, and operator chains, an artificial illumination component (described as "covert – UV," using Ultraviolet light to provide illumination), and a freeze display function. Under Project Night Life, the S-202 it was to be tested on a S-61 helicopter by early 1967. The project itself was being funded by the Advanced Research Projects Agency (ARPA). The Army was also working on Project Dancing Dolls, which was attempting to develop a "foliage penetration radar." Triple canopy jungle in Laos meant that being able to see at night might not be enough to acquire a target. The system was being tested on OV-1 aircraft then in use by the Army, but the USAF envisioned the radar as a component on the planned SCNA F-111s. This program and continued investigations into hunter-killer combinations led to the OV-1B (using SLAR) and OV-1C (using FLIR) aircraft being deployed themselves as hunters, teaming up with gunship aircraft during Operation Commando Hunt.

== Summary ==
No report on the effectiveness of Operation Shed Light as a whole exists. It is known that there was some discontent among some of its major participants. General John D. Ryan, Commander in Chief of the Pacific Air Forces, complained following the poor showings from the Tropic Moon II program that he was "tired of buying everything they send us". He then requested that his staff draft a message that would allow him to send "this thing [the Tropic Moon II B-57B] to CONUS [Continental United States]." Even in regards to the development of the Tropic Moon III aircraft, the Aeronautical Systems Division was forced to admit that the myriad of delays in that program had been caused by "reduced quality control" springing from the "crash" nature of the program.

Shed Light was a crash development project, and was largely unguided. It was tasked with research and development of almost any piece of equipment that might help with the mission outlined in its charter. As a result, few of the programs came to fruition and fewer still left a definitive mark on the conflict. The developments under Shed Light were quickly eclipsed by new aircraft produced under Project Gunship (notably under Gunship II and Gunship III). They were fitted with many of the sensors developed under Shed Light, but took on a life all their own. Shed Light's most visible programs, Black Spot and Tropic Moon, have largely fallen into obscurity.

== Citations and references ==
=== Government Documentation ===
- Blout, Lt. Col Harry D. Air Operations in Northern Laos 1 Apr – 1 Nov 70. Christiansburg, VA: Dalley Book Service, 1971.
- Boerschig Jr, Charles A. Black Spot Special Activities Report. Ubon, Thailand: Black Spot Task Force, 1969.
- Boerschig Jr, Charles A. Black Spot Weekly Activities Report No.29 (21–27 Feb). Ubon, Thailand: Black Spot Task Force, 1969.
- Dalton, LTC Roy C. Interview with Major Victor Anthony, Major Ralph Rowley, and Riley Sunderland. 8 February 1973.
- Gorski Jr, Major Frank J. Interview with LTC V.H. Gallacher and Maj Lyn R. Officer. Eglin AFB, FL. 5 February 1973.
- Kittinger Jr, Col Joseph W. Interview with Lt Col Robert G. Zimmerman. Washington, DC. 5 September 1974
- Knaack, Marcelle Size. Post-World War II Fighters. Washington, DC: Office of Air Force History, Headquarters United States Air Force, 1986.
- Nalty, Bernard C. The War Against Trucks: Aerial Interdiction in Southern Laos, 1968–1972 Washington, DC: Air Force History and Museums Program, United States Air Force, 2005.
- Pfau, Richard A. and William H. Greenhalgh Jr. The Air Force in Southeast Asia: The B-57G – Tropic Moon III 1967–1972. Washington, DC: Office of Air Force History, Headquarters United States Air Force, 1978.
- Smith, C.M. History of the Black Spot Task Force, 29 July 1968 – 11 May 1969. Black Spot Task Force, undated.
- Smith, Mark E. USAF Reconnaissance in South East Asia (1961–66). San Francisco, CA: Headquarters, Pacific Air Force, Department of the Air Force, 1966.
- United States. Aeronautical Systems Division, United States Air Force. Shed Light Program Package Documentation, Volume II. Wright-Patterson, AFB, Ohio: Aeronautical Systems Division, 1966.
- United States. Aeronautical Systems Division, United States Air Force. Shed Light Program Package Documentation, Volume III. Wright-Patterson, AFB, Ohio: Aeronautical Systems Division, 1966.
- United States. DCS Research and Development, Headquarters, United States Air Force. Volume I Operation Shed Light Study Report. Washington, DC: Headquarters, United States Air Force, 1966.
- United States. DCS Research and Development, Headquarters, United States Air Force. Volume II Operation Shed Light Study Report. Washington, DC: Headquarters, United States Air Force, 1966.
- United States. Department of Defense. DOD 4120.15-L Model Designation of Military Aircraft, Rockets, and Guided Missiles. Washington, DC: Department of Defense, 1974.
- United States Government, United States Senate. Hearings Before the Electronic Battlefield Subcommittee of the Preparedness Investigating Subcommittee of the Committee on Armed Services. Washington, DC: US Government Printing Office, 1971.
- United States. Headquarters, Department of the Army. FM 1–40 Attack Helicopter Gunnery. Washington, DC: Headquarters, Department of the Army, 1969.
- United States. Headquarters, Pacific Air Force, United States Air Force. The F-111 in Southeast Asia September 1972 – January 1973. Christiansburg, VA: Dalley Book Service, 1974.
- United States. USAF Tactical Air Warfare Center, Tactical Air Command, United States Air Force. TAC Center Monthly Status Report, August 1967. Eglin AFB, FL: USAF Tactical Air Warfare Center, Tactical Air Command, United States Air Force, 1967.
- United States. USAF Tactical Air Warfare Center, Tactical Air Command, United States Air Force. TAC Center Monthly Status Report, May 1967. Eglin AFB, FL: USAF Tactical Air Warfare Center, Tactical Air Command, United States Air Force, 1967.

=== Secondary Sources ===
- Adcock, Al. C-123 Provider in Action. Carrollton, TX: Squadron/Signal Publications, 1992.
- Davis, Larry. Gunships: A Pictorial History of Spooky. Carrollton, TX: Squadron/Signal Publications, 1982.
- Drendel, Lou. Air War over Southeast Asia, Vol 1. Carrollton, TX: Squadron/Signal Publications, 1982.
- Love, Terry. OV-1 Mohawk in Action. Carrollton, TX: Squadron/Signal Publications, 1989.
- Mesko, Jim. A-26 Invader in Action. Carrollton, TX: Squadron/Signal Publications, 1980.
  - A-26 Invader in Action. Carrollton, TX: Squadron/Signal Publications, 1993.
  - OV-10 Bronco in Action. Carrollton, TX: Squadron/Signal Publications, 1995.
  - VNAF, Republic of Vietnam Air Force 1945–1975. Carrollton, TX: Squadron/Signal Publications, 1987.
- Schlight, John. The War in South Vietnam, the Years of the Offensive, 1965–1968. Washington, DC: Office of Air Force History, United States Air Force, 1988.
- Sullivan, Jim. Skyraider in Action. Carrollton, TX: Squadron/Signal Publications, 1983.
