= Lindh =

Lindh is a surname. Notable people with the surname include:

- Anders Lindh (1929–1996), Swedish gymnast
- Anna Lindh (1957–2003), Swedish politician
  - Anna Lindh Euro-Mediterranean Foundation for the Dialogue Between Cultures
  - Anna Lindh Memorial Fund (Swedish: Anna Lindhs Minnesfond)
- Björn J:son Lindh (1944–2013), Swedish flautist and composer
- Bror Lindh (1877–1941), Swedish painter
- Calle Lindh (born 1990), Swedish alpine skier
- Charlie Lindh (born 1997), Swedish golfer
- Chris Lindh, Swedish singer and member of dansband Barbados
- Emil Lindh (1867–1937), Finnish sailor
- Erik Lindh (disambiguation), multiple people
- Eva Lindh (born 1971), Swedish politician
- Gösta Lindh (1924–1984), Swedish footballer
- Gustaf Lindh (1926–2015), Swedish modern pentathlete
- Gustav Lindh (born 1995), Swedish actor
- Hans Lindh (1930–1987), Swedish figure skater
- Helge Lindh (born 1976), German politician
- Hilary Lindh (born 1969), American alpine ski racer
- Hilda Lindh (1840–1911), Swedish ballerina
- Ingemar Lindh (1945–1997), Swedish theatre director and pedagogue
- Irene Lindh (born 1945), Swedish actor and singer
- Jan Lindh, Swedish musician and drummer of doom metal band Candlemass
- Johan Erik Lindh (1793–1865), Swedish painter
- John Walker Lindh (born 1981), American former Taliban member
- Jonas Lindh (born 1982), Swedish footballer
- Klara Lindh (1877–1914), Swedish suffragist
- Lasse Lindh (born 1974), Swedish indie pop musician
- Louise Lindh (born 1979), Swedish businesswoman
- Lovisa Lindh (born 1991), Swedish middle-distance runner
- Maria Lindh (born 1993), Swedish ice hockey player
- Marius Kryger Lindh (born 1999), Danish footballer
- Mats Lindh (born 1947), Swedish ice hockey player
- Mikaela Lindh (1969–2023), Finnish dressage rider
- Nils Lindh (1889–1957), Swedish ski jumper
- Pär Lindh (born 1959), Swedish musician
- Patricia Lindh (1928–2004), American activist
- Rasmus Lindh (born 2001), Swedish racing driver
- Thomas Lindh (1953–2016), Swedish economist
- Tor-Kristian Lindh (1906–1969), Swedish sailor
- Torsten Lindh, Swedish Navy rear admiral

== See also ==
- Lind
