= Dominati =

Dominati is a surname. Notable people with the surname include:

- Jacques Dominati (1927–2016), French journalist and politician, father of Laurent and Philippe
- Laurent Dominati (born 1960), French politician
- Philippe Dominati (born 1954), French politician
