= Moselle's 2nd constituency =

Constituency of the National Assembly of France

2nd constituency of Moselle
- inline Constituency of the National Assembly of France

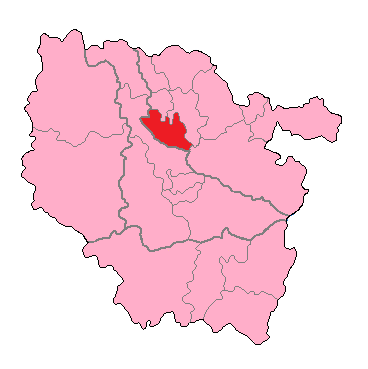
- Moselle's 2nd Constituency shown within Lorraine
- Deputy: Ludovic Mendes; RE
- Department: Moselle
- Cantons: Ars-sur-Moselle, Metz-IV, Montigny-lès-Metz (part), Verny.
- Registered voters: 76,230

The 2nd constituency of Moselle is a French legislative constituency in the Moselle département.

== Description ==
Moselle's 2nd constituency includes the eastern edge of the city of Metz as well as rural areas to the south and south-west as well as most of the large suburb of Montigny-lès-Metz. The seat borders Meurthe-et-Moselle to the west and includes territory on both sides of the river Moselle.

From 1988 until 2017 the seat was held by one man, Denis Jacquat, who in 2002 switched from the UDF to the newly formed UMP of Nicolas Sarkozy. At the 2012 election the Socialists came within less than 700 votes of taking the seat.

== Historic Representation ==
Election	Member	Party
1978	Jean Louis Masson	RPR
1981	Jean Louis Masson	RPR
1986	Proportional representation - no election by constituency	
1988	Denis Jacquat	UDF
1993	Denis Jacquat	UDF
1997	Denis Jacquat	UDF
2002	Denis Jacquat	UMP
2007	Denis Jacquat	UMP
2012	Denis Jacquat	UMP
2017	Ludovic Mendes	LREM
2022	Ludovic Mendes	RE

== Election results ==
=== 2024 ===
->

Legislative Election 2024: Moselle's 2nd constituency
Party	Candidate	Votes	%	±%
RN	Marie-Claude Voinçon	18,352	37.48	+16.99
LO	Mario Rinaldi	461	0.94	N/A
RE (Ensemble)	Ludovic Mendes	14,795	30.22	+6.34
DVE	Aurélie Contal	741	1.51	N/A
PS (NFP)	Victorien Nicolas	13,028	26.61	+23.76
DIV	Gisèle Taty Bouanga	109	0.22	N/A
DIV	Laurent Parisse	1,477	3.02	N/A
Turnout		48,963	97.07	+52.23
Registered electors		76,778		
2nd round result
RE	Ludovic Mendes	27,875	57.65	+27.43
RN	Marie-Claude Voinçon	20,480	42.35	+4.87
Turnout		48,355	95.02	−2.05
Registered electors		76,821		
RE hold		Swing		

=== 2022 ===
Legislative Election 2022: Moselle's 2nd constituency
Party	Candidate	Votes	%	±%
LREM (Ensemble)	Ludovic Mendes	8,005	23.88	-9.72
LFI (NUPÉS)	Lisa Lahore	7,188	21.44	+2.45
RN	Olivier Bauchat	6,871	20.49	+5.90
LR (UDC)	Thierry Hory	4,852	14.47	−12.34
DVC	Raphaël Pitti	2,800	8.35	N/A
REC	Martine Mauser	1,350	4.03	N/A
PS	Jean-Jacques Kurth*	955	2.85	N/A
Others	N/A	1,505	-	−
Turnout		33,526	44.84	−0.44
2nd round result
LREM (Ensemble)	Ludovic Mendes	16,764	56.41	+4.01
LFI (NUPÉS)	Lisa Lahore	12,952	43.59	N/A
Turnout		29,716	43.00	+4.02
LREM hold				

* Dissident PS member, not supported by the party or the NUPES alliance.

=== 2017 ===
Candidate	Label	First round		Second round	
Candidate	Label	Votes	%	Votes	%
Ludovic Mendes	REM	11,422	33.60	14,020	52.40
Jean François	LR	6,232	18.33	12,735	47.60
Marie-Claude Voinçon	FN	4,962	14.59		
Claudine Poirson	FI	3,108	9.14		
Nathalie Colin-Oesterlé	UDI	2,883	8.48		
Jean-Michel Toulouze	PS	2,205	6.49		
Marie-Pierre Comte	ECO	871	2.56		
Quentin Lachenal	DIV	522	1.54		
Irma Vollmer	PCF	306	0.90		
Agnès Brossard	ECO	283	0.83		
Théo Fontaine	DIV	257	0.76		
Marc Le Clec'h	DIV	246	0.72		
Thomas Riboulet	REG	208	0.61		
Mario Rinaldi	EXG	197	0.58		
Jean Lambert	DVG	172	0.51		
Albert Dal Pozzolo	EXG	104	0.31		
Jordane Ciachera	ECO	20	0.06		
Martine Sroczynski	REG	1	0.00		
Votes		33,999	100.00	26,755	100.00
Valid votes		33,999	98.13	26,755	89.72
Blank votes		487	1.41	2,325	7.80
Null votes		160	0.46	740	2.48
Turnout		34,646	45.28	29,820	38.98
Abstentions		41,867	54.72	46,687	61.02
Registered voters		76,513		76,507	
Source: Ministry of the Interior

=== 2012 ===
Legislative Election 2012: Moselle's 2nd constituency
Party	Candidate	Votes	%	±%
PS	Jean-Michel Toulouze	13,400	33.33	
UMP	Denis Jacquat	12,828	31.91	
FN	Thierry Gourlot	7,440	18.51	
NM	Nathalie Colin-Oesterle	2,284	5.68	
FG	Danielle Bori	1,577	3.92	
MoDem	Marjorie Goujon	950	2.36	
Others	N/A	1,720		
Turnout		40,199	52.73	
2nd round result
UMP	Denis Jacquat	19,534	50.86	
PS	Jean-Michel Toulouze	18,875	49.14	
Turnout		38,409	50.39	
UMP hold				

== Sources ==
Official results of French elections from 2002: "Résultats électoraux officiels en France" (in French).
