= Var's 1st constituency =

Constituency of the National Assembly of France

1st constituency of Var
- inline Constituency of the National Assembly of France

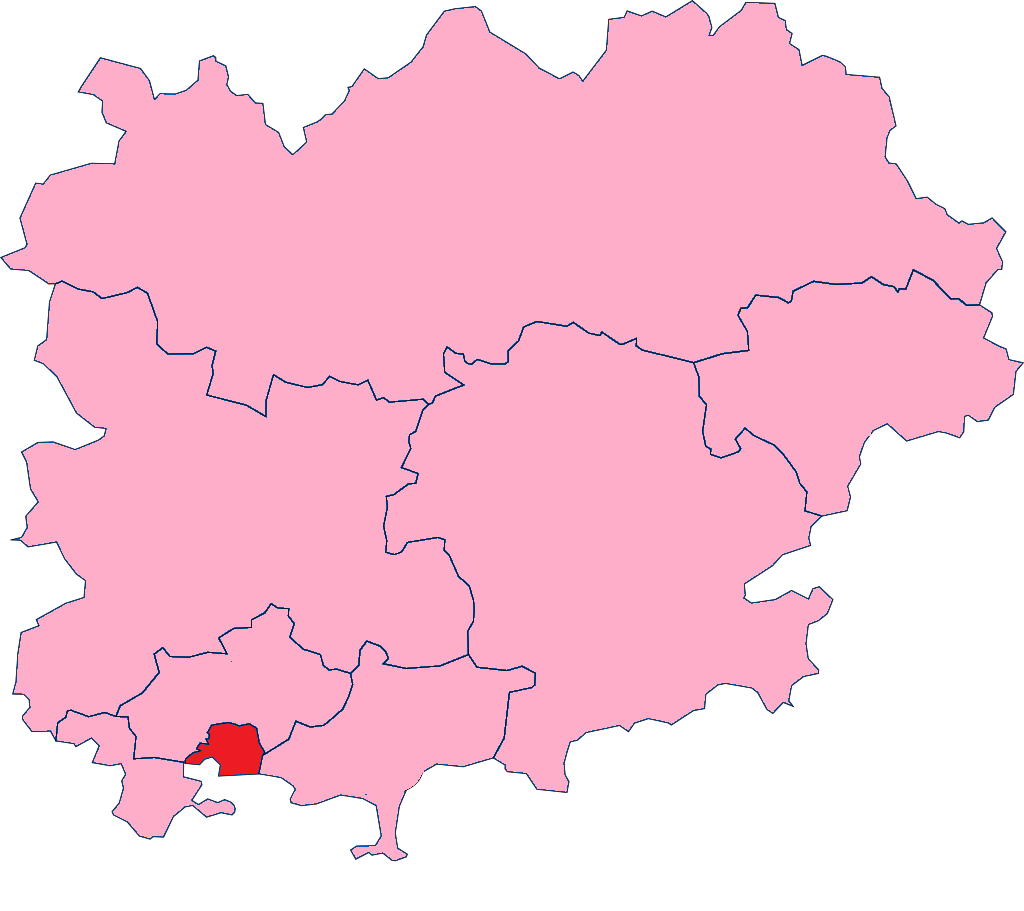
- Var's 1st Constituency shown within the Var
- Deputy: Yannick Chenevard; RE
- Department: Var
- Cantons: Toulon I, Toulon IV, Toulon V, Toulon VI, Toulon VII, Toulon VIII, Toulon IX
- Registered voters: 74,842

The 1st constituency of the Var (French: Première circonscription du Var) is a French legislative constituency in the Var département. Like the other 576 French constituencies, it elects one MP using the two-round system, with a run-off if no candidate receives over 50% of the vote in the first round.

== Description ==
The 1st constituency of the Var covers the bulk of the naval city of Toulon on the Mediterranean Coast.

This constituency was one of only two in the department to elect a deputy from The Republicans in 2017 despite their total dominance of the department in the 2012 elections. In the 2022 elections, the constituency was the only one in the department not to elect a deputy from the far-right National Rally, instead returning a member from the centrist La République En Marche!.

== Assembly members ==
Election	Member	Party
1988	Daniel Colin	UDF
1993	Daniel Colin	UDF
1997	Jean-Marie Le Chevallier	FN
1998	Odette Casanova	PS
1998	Odette Casanova	PS
2002	Geneviève Levy	UMP
2007	Geneviève Levy	UMP
2012	Geneviève Levy	UMP
2017	Geneviève Levy	LR
2022	Yannick Chenevard	RE

== Election results ==
=== 2024 ===
Legislative Election 2024: Var's 1st constituency
Party	Candidate	Votes	%	±%
RN	Sébastien Soulé	19,233	42.28	+17.72
LO	Marie-Renée Balty	610	1.34	n/a
RE (Ensemble)	Yannick Chenevard	14,270	31.37	+0.37
REC	Guillaume Tchakmakdjian	1,197	2.63	−7.88
LFI (NFP)	Eric Habouzit	10,182	22.38	+2.73
Turnout		45,492	97.52	+51.15
Registered electors		71,099		
2nd round result
RE	Yannick Chenevard	23,114	52.85	−0.64
RN	Sébastien Soulé	20,622	47.15	+0.64
Turnout		43,736	96.58	+53.28
Registered electors		71,123		
RE hold		Swing		

Source: https://www.resultats-elections.interieur.gouv.fr/legislatives2024/ensemble_geographique/93/83/8301/index.html

=== 2022 ===
Legislative Election 2022: Var's 1st constituency
Party	Candidate	Votes	%	±%
LREM (Ensemble)	Yannick Chenevard	10,222	31.00	-0.80
RN	Amaury Navarranne	8,097	24.56	+3.61
LFI (NUPÉS)	Eric Habouzit	6,477	19.65	+6.13
REC	Philippe Heno	3,464	10.51	N/A
LR (UDC)	Philippe Vitel	2,190	6.64	−18.87
DVE	Marie-Aurore Gianolzo	932	2.83	N/A
Others	N/A	1,587	4.81	
Turnout		32,969	46.37	+1.87
2nd round result
LREM (Ensemble)	Yannick Chenevard	15,649	53.49	+8.67
RN	Amaury Navarranne	13,606	46.51	N/A
Turnout		29,255	43.30	+8.02
LREM gain from LR				

=== 2017 ===
Legislative Election 2017: Var's 1st constituency
Party	Candidate	Votes	%	±%
LREM	Elisabeth Chantrieux	10,592	31.80	
LR	Geneviève Levy	8,496	25.51	
FN	Amaury Navarranne	7,310	21.95	
LFI	Luc Leandri	2,742	8.23	
EELV	Delphine De Luca	1,034	3.10	
DVD	Philippe Sans	869	2.61	
PCF	Alain Glemet	729	2.19	
Others	N/A	1,532		
Turnout		33,304	44.50	
2nd round result
LR	Geneviève Levy	14,448	55.18	
LREM	Elisabeth Chantrieux	11,734	44.82	
Turnout		26,182	34.98	
LR hold				

=== 2012 ===
Legislative Election 2012: Var's 1st constituency
Party	Candidate	Votes	%	±%
UMP	Geneviève Levy	16,799	42.02	
PS	Robert Alfonsi	11,094	27.75	
FN	Danièle Le Gac	8,241	20.62	
FG	Philippe Himber	1,652	4.13	
MoDem	Pierre-Jacques Depallens	909	2.27	
Others	N/A	1,280		
Turnout		39,975	54.32	
2nd round result
UMP	Geneviève Levy	23,213	62.52	
PS	Robert Alfonsi	13,915	37.48	
Turnout		37,128	50.45	
UMP hold				

=== 2007 ===
Legislative Election 2007: Var's 1st constituency
Party	Candidate	Votes	%	±%
UMP	Geneviève Levy	16,599	57.89	
DVG	Alain Jaubert	4,549	15.87	
FN	Danièle Le Gac	2,265	7.90	
MoDem	Bruno Ravaz	1,967	6.86	
PCF	Alain Bolla	1,134	3.96	
LV	Philippe Chesneau	647	2.26	
Others	N/A	1,511		
Turnout		29,073	56.65	
UMP hold				

=== 2002 ===
Legislative Election 2002: Var's 1st constituency
Party	Candidate	Votes	%	±%
UMP	Geneviève Levy	11,725	39.82	
PS	Odette Casanova	6,726	22.84	
FN	Eliane de la Brosse	5,959	20.24	
RPF	Jean-Charles Marchiani	1,592	5.41	
DVD	Huguette Besset	1,331	4.52	
Others	N/A	2,109		
Turnout		29,957	60.11	
2nd round result
UMP	Geneviève Levy	17,953	69.27	
PS	Odette Casanova	7,965	30.73	
Turnout		27,369	54.92	
UMP gain from FN				

=== September 1998 by-election ===
A by-election was called after the results of the constituency in the previous by-election were also invalidated.

September 1998 by-election: Var's 1st constituency
Party	Candidate	Votes	%	±%
FN	Cendrine Le Chevallier		39.66	+0.11
PS	Odette Casanova		36.69	+5.00
RPR	Mark Bayle		21.00	N/A
Others	N/A		2.65	
Turnout			43	
2nd round result
PS	Odette Casanova		51.49	+1.42
FN	Cendrine Le Chevallier		48.51	−1.42
Turnout			49.31	
PS hold				

=== April–May 1998 by-election ===
A by-election was called after the results of the constituency in the 1997 election were invalidated.

April-May 1998 by-election: Var's 1st constituency
Party	Candidate	Votes	%	±%
FN	Cendrine Le Chevallier		39.55	+7.15
PS	Odette Casanova		31.69	+5.07
UDF	Daniel Colin		22.30	+2.30
GE	René Cavanna		2.15	−0.26
Others	N/A		4.30	
Turnout		23,700	44.83	−20.46
2nd round result
PS	Odette Casanova		50.07	+3.24
FN	Cendrine Le Chevallier		49.93	−3.24
Turnout				
PS gain from FN				

=== 1997 ===
Legislative Election 1997: Var's 1st constituency
Party	Candidate	Votes	%	±%
FN	Jean-Marie Le Chevallier	10,471	32.40	
PS	Odette Casanova	8,604	26.62	
UDF	Daniel Colin	6,463	20.00	
RPR	Marc Bayle*	4,010	12.41	
GE	René Cavanna	779	2.41	
DVD	Jacques Croidieu	701	2.17	
Others	N/A	1,293		
Turnout		33,291	63.51	
2nd round result
FN	Jean-Marie Le Chevallier	16,420	53.17	
PS	Odette Casanova	14,463	46.83	
Turnout		34,226	65.29	
FN gain from UDF				

* RPR dissident
