= Ludovic Mendes =

French politician (born 1987)

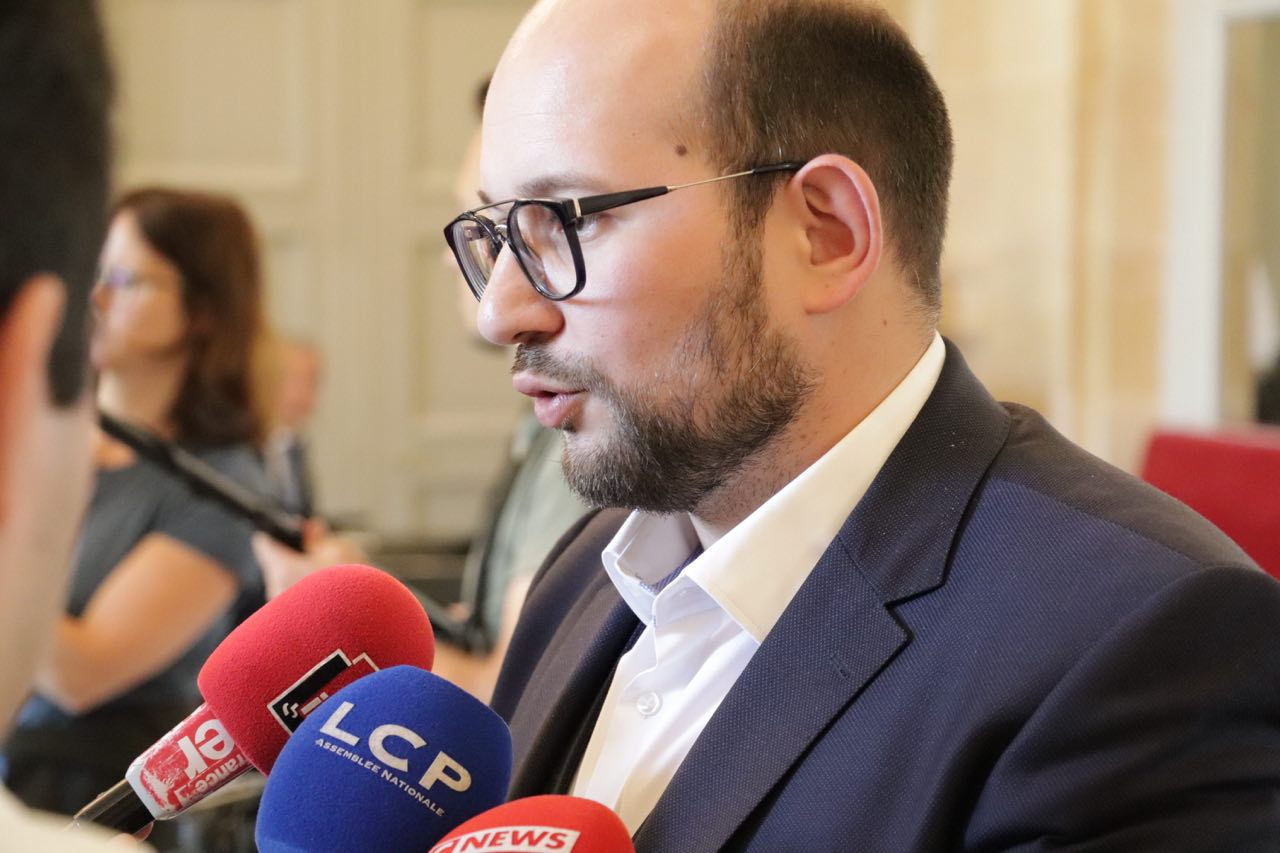

Member of the National Assembly for Moselle's 2nd constituency
- Incumbent
- Assumed office 21 June 2017
- Preceded by: Denis Jacquat

Personal details
- Born: 11 April 1987 (age 39) Metz, France
- Party: La République En Marche!

Ludovic Mendes (born 11 April 1987) is a French politician of La République En Marche! (LREM) who was elected to the French National Assembly on 18 June 2017, representing the department of Moselle.

== Political career ==
In parliament, Mendes serves as member of the Committee on Legal Affairs. In this capacity, he is the parliament's rapporteur on the legalization of cannabidiol.

In early 2018, Mendes was one of three LREM members who set up an informal parliamentary working group on Islam in order to contribute to the government's bill aimed at better organising and supervising the financing of the Muslim faith in France. Alongside Isabelle Florennes, he drafted 11 recommendations to the government in 2022 to fight against anti-religious acts.

In addition to his committee assignments, Mendes is part of the French-Portuguese Parliamentary Friendship Group.

== Political positions ==
In May 2018, Mendes co-sponsored an initiative in favour of legalizing assisted reproductive technology (ART) for all women (singles, heterosexual couples or lesbian couples).

In July 2019, Mendes voted in favor of the French ratification of the European Union's Comprehensive Economic and Trade Agreement (CETA) with Canada.

== See also ==
- 2017 French legislative election
