= Paris's 1st constituency =

Constituency of the National Assembly of France

1st constituency of Paris
- inline Constituency of the National Assembly of France

- Paris, showing its legislative constituency boundaries from 2012
- Deputy: Sylvain Maillard; RE
- Department: Paris

The 1st constituency of Paris (French: Première circonscription de Paris) is a French legislative constituency in the department of Paris. Like the other 576 French constituencies, it elects one member of the National Assembly using the two-round system. Its boundaries were heavily redrawn in 1988 and 2012. In the 2017 legislative election, Sylvain Maillard of La République En Marche! (LREM) won a majority of the vote in the first round.

1st constituency of Paris
- inline Constituency of the National Assembly of France

- Paris, showing its legislative constituencies between 1988 and 2012
- Member: constituency abolished, 2012
- Department: Paris

Map of Paris constituencies in 1981.

== Deputies ==
Election	Member	Party
1958	Jean Legaret	CNIP
1962	Pierre-Charles Krieg	UNR
1967	Pierre-Charles Krieg	UDR
1968	Pierre-Charles Krieg	UDR
1973	Pierre-Charles Krieg	UDR
1978	Pierre-Charles Krieg	RPR
1981	Pierre-Charles Krieg	RPR
1986	Proportional representation – no election by constituency	
1988	Jacques Dominati	UDF
1993	Laurent Dominati	UDF
1997	Laurent Dominati	UDF
2002	Martine Billard	LV
2007	Martine Billard	LV
2009	Martine Billard	PG
2012	Pierre Lellouche	UMP
2017	Sylvain Maillard	LREM
2022	Sylvain Maillard	RE

== Election results ==
=== 2024 ===
Candidate	Party	Alliance	First round			Second round		
Candidate	Party	Alliance	Votes	%	+/–	Votes	%	+/–
Sylvain Maillard	RE	ENS	28,048	44.70	+2.77	35,239	63.64	-1.93
Raphaël Kempf	LFI	NFP	20,138	32.09	+4.91	20,132	36.36	+1.93
Delphine Voirin	RN		6,303	10.04	+7.15			
Laurence Sailliet	LR		3,469	5.53	-3.99			
Pierre Maurin	LR diss.		2,883	4.59	N/A			
Marine Chiaberto	REC		991	1.58	-4.81			
Alban Ludovic Bertrand Pineau	DIV		598	0.95	N/A			
Laurence Boulinier	LO		231	0.37	-0.09			
Mathilde Contensou	Volt		89	0.14	N/A			
Axel Metzker	DIV		3	0.00	N/A			
Aurélien Gautreau	EXG		0	0.00	N/A			
Valid votes			62,753	98.95	+0.13	55,371	95.63	-0.16
Blank votes			495	0.78	-0.15	1,931	3.34	-0.02
Null votes			173	0.27	+0.02	598	1.03	+0.18
Turnout			63,421	75.22	+18.95	57,900	68.67	+14.53
Abstentions			20,888	24.78	-18.95	26,412	31.33	-14.53
Registered voters			84,309			84,312		
Source: Ministry of the Interior, Le Monde
Result						RE HOLD		

=== 2022 ===
Legislative Election 2022: Paris's 1st constituency
Party	Candidate	Votes	%	±%
LREM (Ensemble)	Sylvain Maillard	19,718	41.93	-8.87
LFI (NUPÉS)	Thomas Luquet	12,780	27.18	+8.11
LR (UDC)	Vincent Baladi	4,479	9.52	−8.24
REC	David Attia	3,004	6.39	N/A
UDI (UDC)	Manon Chaumette	2,247	4.78	N/A
DVD	Catherine Lecuyer	1,977	4.20	N/A
RN	Morgane Chedhomme	1,357	2.89	+0.72
Bastir!	Juliane Faux	675	1.44	N/A
Others	N/A	1,464		
Turnout		47,585	56.27	−2.69
2nd round result
LREM (Ensemble)	Sylvain Maillard	28,655	65.57	N/A
LFI (NUPÉS)	Thomas Luquet	15,046	34.43	N/A
Turnout		43,701	54.14	N/A
LREM hold				

=== 2017 ===
2017 legislative election: Paris's 1st constituency
Party	Candidate	Votes	%	±%
LREM	Sylvain Maillard	24,037	50.80	N/A
LR	Jean-François Legaret	8,402	17.76	−23.58
PS	Pauline Veron	3,705	7.83	−26.24
LFI	Patrick Comoy	2,840	6.00	N/A
EELV	Victoria Barigant	2,481	5.24	−0.81
DVD	Vincent Baladi	1,578	3.34	N/A
FN	Guylaine Coeffier	1,029	2.17	−2.36
Others	N/A	3,242		
Turnout		47,630	58.96	−0.35
LREM gain from LR		Swing		

=== 2012 ===
2012 legislative election: Paris's 1st constituency
Party	Candidate	Votes	%	±%
UMP	Pierre Lellouche	18,788	41.32	+1.62
PS	Claire Morel	15,489	34.07	N/A
EELV	Jacques Boutault	2,750	6.05	−31.05
FN	Annie Thierry	2,059	4.53	+2.43
FG	Anne Sabourin	1,529	3.36	+1.36
MoDem	Sandra Fellous	1,462	3.22	−10.28
AC	Lynda Asmani	1,001	2.20	N/A
Others	N/A	2,389		
Turnout		45,467	59.31	−3.39
2nd round result
UMP	Pierre Lellouche	23,210	53.17	+7.47
PS	Claire Morel	20,440	46.83	N/A
Turnout		43,650	56.94	−3.06
UMP gain from EELV				

=== 2007 ===
Elections between 1988 and 2007 were based on the 1988 boundaries.

Map of Paris Constituencies, 1988-2007 elections

2007 legislative election: Paris's 1st constituency
Party	Candidate	Votes	%	±%
UMP	Jean-François Legaret	15,567	39.7	+2.2
LV	Martine Billard	14,554	37.1	+4.1
MoDem	Mario Stasi	5,286	13.5	+6.2
FN	Patricia Delcher	830	2.1	−2.7
PCF	Michèle Zalcman	801	2.0	−0.2
DIV	Diane Adam	680	1.7	+1.7
DIV	François di Giulio	306	0.8	+0.8
DVD	Aurélien Veron	254	0.7	+0.7
DVD	Bruno North	216	0.6	+0.6
DVG	Sophie Menard	140	0.4	+0.4
DIV	Danièle Hanryon	130	0.3	+0.3
DIV	Janine Biselx	101	0.3	+0.3
DIV	Michel Thooris	100	0.3	+0.3
DIV	Hélène Rubenstein-Carrera	94	0.2	+0.2
DIV	Véronique de Pons	1	0.0	+0.0
Turnout		39,560	62.7	
2nd round result
LV	Martine Billard	20,125	54.3	+3.4
UMP	Jean-François Legaret	16,969	45.7	−3.4
Turnout		37,817	60.0	
LV hold		Swing		

=== 2002 ===
2002 legislative election: Paris's 1st constituency
Party	Candidate	Votes	%	±%
UMP	Jean-François Legaret	14,479	37.54	
LV	Martine Billard	12,744	33.04	
PRG	Patrice Lefeu	2,824	7.32	
UDF	Patrick Lozes	2,588	6.71	
FN	Pierre Paris	1,849	4.79	
PCF	Evelyne Zarka	855	2.22	
Others	N/A	3,235		
Turnout		38,948	70.83	
2nd round result
LV	Martine Billard	18,327	50.91	
UMP	Jean-François Legaret	17,669	49.09	
Turnout		36,773	66.89	
LV gain from UDF				

=== 1997 ===
1997 legislative election: Paris's 1st constituency
Party	Candidate	Votes	%	±%
UDF	Laurent Dominati	12,049	35.58	
PS (GP)	Dominique Bertinotti	10,010	29.56	
FN	Joëlle Lombard	2,816	8.32	
PCF (GP)	Sylvie Nicolier	1,890	5.58	
LV (GP)	Yves Contassot	1,650	4.87	
DVD	Emmanuel Lardeux	828	2.44	
LO	Josette Recan	720	2.13	
Others	N/A	3,903		
Turnout		34,818	62.10	
2nd round result
UDF	Laurent Dominati	18,350	50.32	
PS (GP)	Dominique Bertinotti	18,116	49.68	
Turnout		37,724	67.28	
UDF hold				
