= Deborah Rodriguez =

Deborah Rodriguez may refer to:

- Deborah Rodriguez (writer), American writer and humanitarian
- Déborah Rodríguez, Uruguayan athlete and fashion model
- Deborah Rodríguez, karateka, bronze medal winner in Karate at the 2010 Central American and Caribbean Games
