= Jean-Louis Masson (politician, 1947) =

French politician

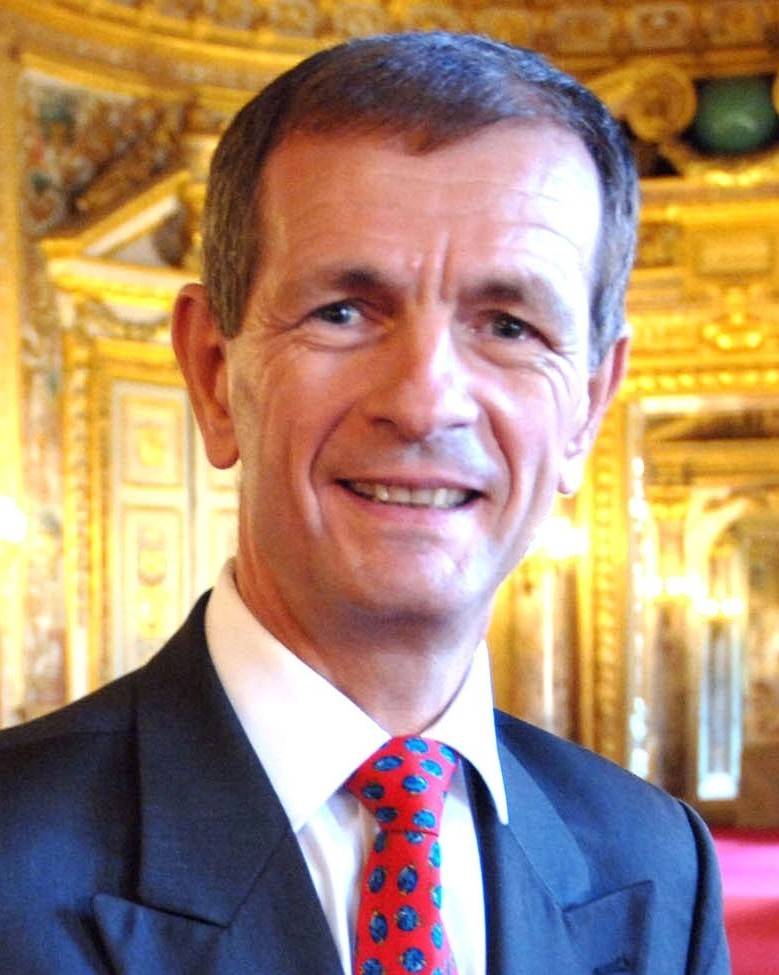
- Masson in 2014

Senator for Moselle
- Incumbent
- Assumed office 1 October 2001

Member of the National Assembly for Moselle
- In office 3 April 1978 – 16 December 1997
- Preceded by: Pierre Kédinger
- Succeeded by: Marie-Jo Zimmermann
- Constituency: 2nd (1978–1986); At-large (1986–1988); 3rd (1988–1997)

Personal details
- Born: 25 March 1947 (age 79) Metz, France
- Party: Independent
- Other political affiliations: Rally for the Republic (1978–2002); Union for a Popular Movement (2002–2003)

Jean-Louis Masson (born 25 March 1947) is a French politician. An Independent, he has served as a Senator for Moselle since 2001. He previously served as a member of the National Assembly for Moselle from 1978 to 1997. Masson is a former member of the Rally for the Republic (RPR) and Union for a Popular Movement (UMP).

== Career ==
A native of Metz, he is an alumnus of École Polytechnique (1966) and Mines ParisTech (1974). He then worked as a public servant, notably as chief inspector of France's nuclear installations. In 1976, he is elected to the General Council of Moselle. At the 1978 legislative election, he was elected to the National Assembly. In 2001, he was elected to the Senate. Since 2004, he has been a member of the administrative meeting of senators not appearing on the list of any group (RASNAG).

== Controversies ==
In 2015, Masson stated that "today's immigration is tomorrow's terrorism". In 2019, he compared Muslim women to Halloween witches, also stating that "if they do not like it, they can go back from where they came from".
