= Charlotte Leduc =

French politician

Member of the National Assembly for Moselle's 3rd constituency
- In office 22 June 2022 – 9 june 2024
- Preceded by: Richard Lioger
- Succeeded by: Nathalie Colin-Oesterlé

Personal details
- Born: 18 June 1980 (age 46) Senlis, Oise, France
- Party: La France Insoumise
- Education: Paris 1 Panthéon-Sorbonne University

Charlotte Leduc (born 18 June 1980) is a French politician from La France Insoumise (NUPES) who has represented Moselle's 3rd constituency in the National Assembly from 2022 to 2024.
