= Pierre Lellouche =

French politician (born 1951)

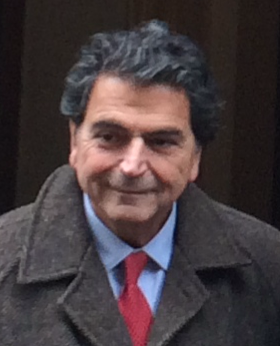

Member of the National Assembly for Paris's 1st constituency
- In office 20 June 2012 – 20 June 2017
- Preceded by: Martine Billard
- Succeeded by: Sylvain Maillard

Member of the National Assembly for Paris's 4th constituency
- In office 12 June 1997 – 23 July 2009
- Preceded by: Gabriel Kaspereit
- Succeeded by: Edwige Antier

Member of the National Assembly for Val d'Oise's 8th constituency
- In office 2 April 1993 – 21 April 1997
- Preceded by: Bernard Angels
- Succeeded by: Dominique Strauss-Kahn

Personal details
- Born: 3 May 1951 (age 75) Tunis, Tunisia
- Party: The Republicans
- Education: Sciences Po; Harvard University
- Profession: Lawyer

Pierre Lellouche (French pronunciation: [pjɛʁ ləluʃ]; born on 3 May 1951), is a lawyer and geopolitics specialist, recognized as a right-wing political figure in France. He is also known for his work as a columnist and author. Elected as a deputy in Sarcelles in 1993, he subsequently represented the 4th constituency of Paris from 1997 until his appointment as Secretary of State for European Affairs in June 2009. In November 2010, Lellouche was appointed Secretary of State for Foreign Trade in the Fillon III government, a position he held until the end of Nicolas Sarkozy's presidency in May 2012. He was re-elected as a deputy for the 1st constituency of Paris in June 2012, serving until April 2017, when he retired from elective politics. Since then, he has continued his career as a lawyer, geopolitics consultant, member of influential think tanks, and columnist.

== Biography ==
Pierre Lellouche was born in Tunis (Tunisia), among the Jewish community. He is one of four children of Noël Lellouche, who had fought in the Free French Forces during World War II. Following Tunisia's attainment of independence in 1956, the family relocated to Paris. There, Noël Lellouche initially worked for Renault before opening his own restaurant.

He pursued higher education at Lycée Condorcet in Paris. A few years later, he graduated with a higher degree from the Faculty of Law of Paris X-Nanterre (1972) and from the Institut d'Études Politiques de Paris (1973), holding a Master of Laws (LLM) and a Juris Doctor degree from Harvard Law School and graduated in Masters in Public Law Advanced studies (1973) from Paris Nanterre University

In 1973, he attended Harvard Law School on an Arthur Sachs fellowship. He briefly paused his academic pursuits to serve in the French Army from 1976 to 1977. Resuming his studies, he earned his LLM in 1974, followed by an SJD in 1978. His doctorate dissertation focused on the 'Internationalization of the nuclear fuel cycle as a non-proliferation strategy,' under the guidance of Professor Abram Chayes. Concurrently, he was a fellow at the Harvard Center for Science and International Affairs, studying under the mentorship of Joseph Nye and Stanley Hoffmann.

== Career outside politics ==
In 1978 worked with Raymond Aron at the Maison des Sciences de l’Homme, within the Study and Research Group on International Problems (GERPI).

In 1979, he co-founds the French Institute of International Relations (IFRI) with Thierry de Montbrial. Until 1988, he was Deputy Director of IFRI, in charge of Politico-military studies.

At the same time, he taught International Relations at several institutions, including INSEAD Business School, the École Supérieure de Guerre Military Academy, and Galatasaray University in Istanbul.

From 1980 to 1995, he served as a columnist for the news magazines Newsweek and Le Point. He continues to contribute thought-provoking articles to various newspapers and magazines, and as of 2023, he remains an active writer and publisher.

In 1988, he was assistant editor-in-chief of quarterly journal Politique Étrangère.

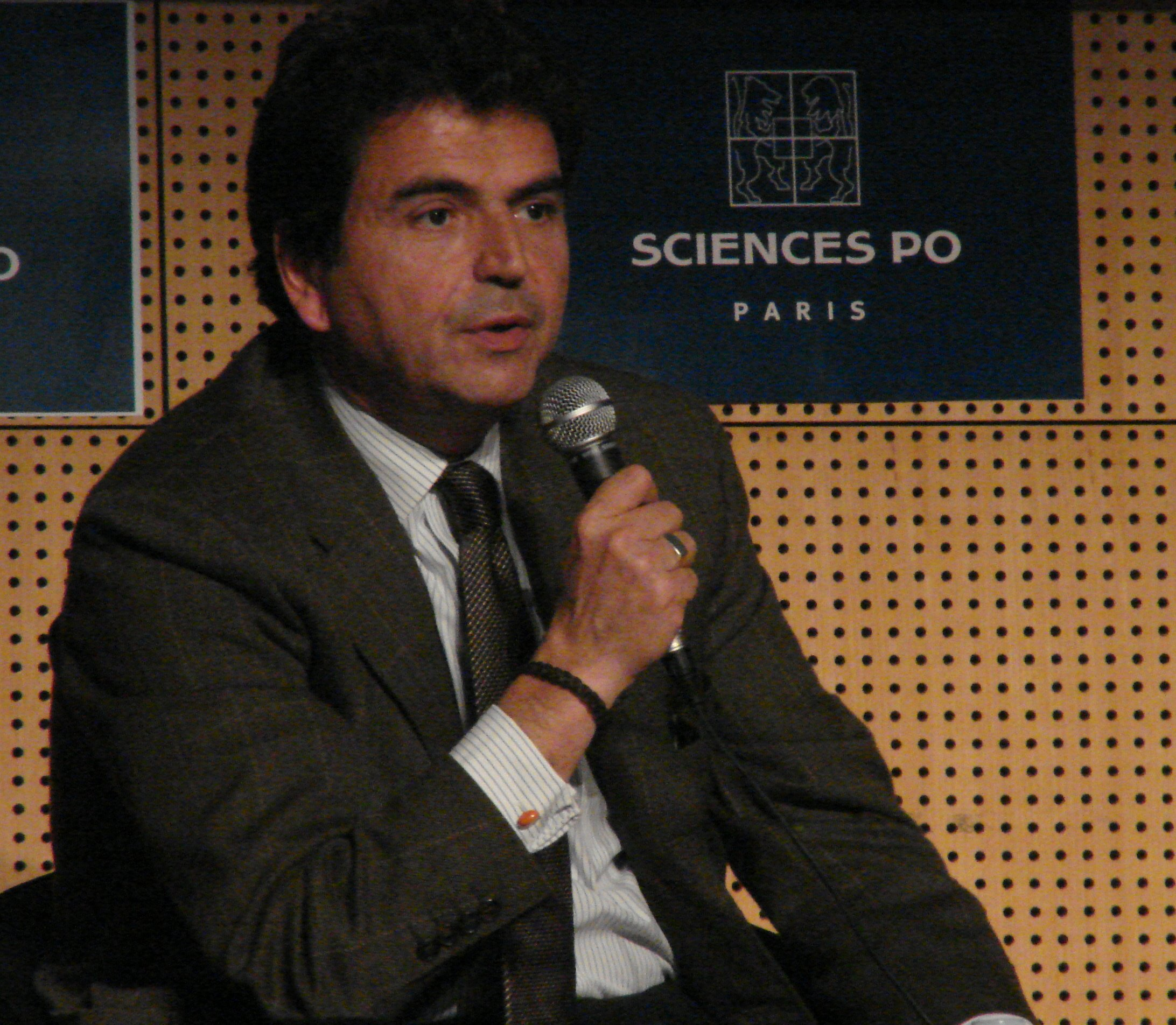
Pierre Lellouche in 2007 at Science Politique Paris

From 2020, he serves as a regular guest commentator on the French TV channel CNews.

In June 2024, Pierre Lellouche was appointed president of the French High Committee for National Resilience (HCFRN), an organization focused on national security and resilience research and monitoring.

=== Other activities ===
- European Leadership Network (ELN), Member
- French Institute of International Relations (IFRI), co-founder and Member of the Board of Directors
- Nuclear Threat Initiative (NTI), Member
- Trilateral Commission, Member
- Terra Firma, Advisory Board member
- The International Institute for Strategic Studies, Member of the Board

== Political career ==
=== Early beginnings ===
In 1986, he became a part of the consulting team for Jacques Chirac. He then served as Chirac's diplomatic adviser from 1989 to 1996 during which time Chirac held various positions: Mayor of Paris, President of the RPR party, and, from 1995 onwards, President of the French Republic.

Lellouche was a member of the National Assembly of France, first for Val d'Oise's 8th constituency (1993-1997) and later for Paris' 4th constituency (1997-2009). In parliament, Pierre Lellouche served on the Defense Committee (1993-1994 and 1997–2002) and the Committee on Foreign Affairs (1995-1997 and 2002–2007). In addition to his committee assignments, he was a member of the French delegation to the NATO Parliamentary Assembly from 1997 until 2009; he served as the Assembly's president from November 2004 to November 2006.

From 2002, Lellouche was also a member of "The Reformers" within the UMP group, which advocated deep reform of the administration and liberalization of the economy.

In 2002, Pierre Lellouche authored a bill to increase penalties for racist and anti-Semitic offenses. This proposal was unanimously adopted by the National Assembly on 10 December 2002, and became known as the "Lellouche Law".

2002-09 - Negotiator, mandated by Jacques Chirac, for France on the ITER experimental reactor (thermonuclear fusion) at Cadarache, against the competing Japanese location at Fukushima.

After the 2007 French legislative elections, Pierre Lellouche received backing from his political allies, Nicolas Sarkozy and François Fillon, for the role of chair of either the National Assembly's Committee on Foreign Affairs or the Defence Committee. However, Edouard Balladur, who had been defeated by Chirac in 1995, secured the position as a form of "compensation."

On the local level, Lellouche was also a municipal councillor of Cannes (1995-2001) and a councillor of Paris (since 2001; reelected in 2008).

In 2008, Pierre Lellouche was appointed by French President Sarkozy as special advisor on Franco-Turkish affairs during a period of heightened diplomatic tensions between the two countries. In 2009, he was appointed as special envoy for Afghanistan and Pakistan within the Ministry of Foreign Affairs. In this role, he collaborated closely with Richard Holbrooke of the United States, Bernd Mützelburg of Germany, and Sherard Cowper-Coles of the United Kingdom.

=== Governmental functions ===
- Secretary of State for Foreign Trade: 2010-2012
- Secretary of State for European Affairs: 2009-2010

As State Secretary for European Affairs, Lellouche was involved in the negotiations on the European Financial Stability Facility (EFSF) in 2010. In response to the 2010 Russian wildfires, he told Le Figaro that the EU should pool assets to create a European emergency force and build mutual assistance capabilities to deal with emergencies.

=== Later career ===
Upon returning to parliament, Pierre Lellouche served on the Committee on Foreign Affairs again from 2012 until 2017. In this capacity, he joined a delegation led by François Fillon, on an official trip to Iraq in September 2014.

In 2016, Lellouche's call for the impeachment of President Hollande for allegedly disclosing classified information to journalists, was dismissed by a cross-party steering committee.

Ahead of the Republicans' 2016 presidential primary, Lellouche endorsed François Fillon as the party's candidate for the 2017 French presidential election. Amid the Fillon affair, he resigned from the campaign team. In an open letter, he also announced his plans to leave politics.

== Summary of Political Mandates and Functions ==
- April 1993 - April 1997: Deputy for the 8th constituency of Val-d'Oise
- June 1997 to June 2002: Deputy (for RPR) for the 4th constituency of Paris
- Since March 2001: Paris Councillor (city and department)
- June 2002 to June 2007: Reelected Deputy (for UMP) for the 4th constituency of Paris
- June 2007 to July 2009: Reelected Deputy (UMP) for the 4th constituency of Paris
- 2004 to 2006: President of the NATO Parliamentary Assembly
- March 2009 to June 2009: Special Representative of France for Afghanistan and Pakistan
- June 2009 to November 2010: Secretary of State for European Affairs
- November 2010 to May 2012: Secretary of State for Foreign Trade
- June 2012 to June 2017: Deputy (UMP) for the 1st constituency of Paris

== Political positions ==
=== European integration ===
Pierre Lellouche called the UK Conservative Party's policy on the EU "pathetic" and a kind of political autism, claiming "They have essentially castrated your UK influence in the European parliament."

=== Foreign policy ===
Pierre Lellouche is considered to be a supporter of strong cooperation with the United States of America.

After the 2022 Russian invasion of Ukraine, he explained Crimea would stay Russian because no one will go to war for Ukraine and asked in 2023 if it is not time to wonder about a way out of this war ?.

=== Domestic policy ===
In October 1999, Pierre Lellouche defended a traditional view of the family during the discussions concerning the Pacte civil de solidarité (PACS), a contractual form of civil union. Several observers pointed out some of his "homophobic" arguments. However, later on in 2003 he was in favor of a law introducing harsher punishments for abuses against homosexuals.

He was also a strong opponent of the solidarity tax on wealth (ISF) first voted under François Mitterrand.

In 2015, Lellouche opposed a parliamentary decision to create a $60-million fund to compensate Holocaust victims deported by French state rail firm SNCF to Nazi concentration camps in a move also intended to protect the company from future U.S. litigation.

In response to the January 2015 Île-de-France attacks, Pierre Lellouche publicly opposed a bill proposed by Prime Minister Manuel Valls to let France's intelligence services deploy fly-on-the-wall spying devices more easily against suspected terrorists.

=== Israel ===
In 2003, he declared in the French newspaper Libération, "a new antisemitism, is linked to the crisis in the Middle East, which appeared about twenty years ago". In 2014, he has opposed the socialist resolution on the recognition of a Palestinian state, but softly protested "against the unbearable and unacceptable interference of the Prime Minister Benjamin Netanyahu on the vote of the French Parliament". In 2015, he discovers having been monitored by the NSA. In 2017, he reaffirms his position on “the necessary halt to the construction of new settlements”, but declares himself against a “strategy of one-upmanship against Israel”.

== Works ==
- L'Engrenage : La guerre d'Ukraine et le basculement du monde. Odile Jacob. 2024. 368 pages. ISBN 978-2415010461
- Pacifisme et dissuasion. IFRI-Economica. 1983. 329 pages. ISBN 978-2865920099.
- L’Avenir de la guerre: Essai. Mazarine. 1985. ISBN 978-2863741214.
- Kaiser, Karl et Lellouche, Pierre. Le couple franco-allemand et la défense de l’Europe. Paris, IFRI, Editions Economica, Coll. 'L’Europe et sa défense », vol. 1, 1986, 360 p. Études internationales, 19(3), 579–581.. ISBN 9782865920273.
- Trystram, Florence et Lellouche, Pierre. Le Millénaire de l’Apocalypse. Flammarion. 1980. 225 pages. ISBN 9782080643162
- Le Nouveau Monde: De l'ordre de Yalta au désordre des nations. Grasset. 532 pages. 1992. ISBN 9782246441991. Prix Aujourd'hui, Hachette Pluriel, 1993.
- La République immobile. Grasset. 400 pages. 1998. ISBN 9782246531616.
- Illusions gauloises. Grasset. 400 pages. 2006. ISBN 9782246691594.
- L'Allié indocile: La France et l'OTAN, de la guerre froide à l'Afghanistan. Éditions du Moment. 253 pages. 2009. ISBN 9782354170585.
- Mondialisez-vous: Manifeste pour une France conquérante. Éditions du Moment. 176 pages. 2012. ISBN 9782354171445.
- Une Guerre Sans Fin. Éditions du Cerf. 480 pages. 2017. ISBN 9782204117821.

Diplomatic posts
Preceded by Doug Bereuter	President of the NATO Parliamentary Assembly; 2004–2006	Succeeded by Bert Koenders
