= Yannick Chenevard =

French politician (born 1959)

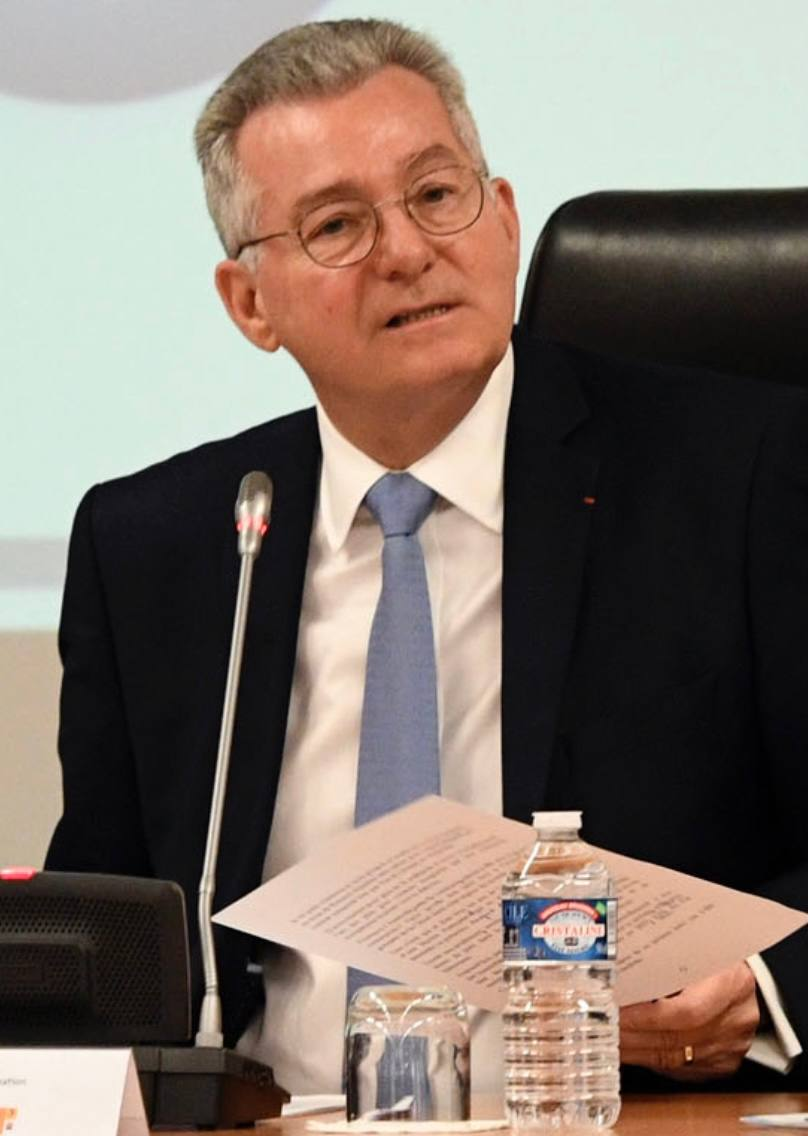

Member of the National Assembly for Var's 1st constituency
- Incumbent
- Assumed office 22 June 2022
- Preceded by: Geneviève Levy

Personal details
- Born: 27 November 1959 (age 66) Toulon, France
- Party: La République En Marche!
- Occupation: politician

Yannick Chenevard (born 27 November 1959) is a French politician from La République En Marche!. He was elected as a deputy for Var's 1st constituency in the 2022 French legislative election.

== See also ==
- List of deputies of the 16th National Assembly of France
