= Moselle's 3rd constituency =

Constituency of the National Assembly of France

3rd constituency of Moselle
- inline Constituency of the National Assembly of France

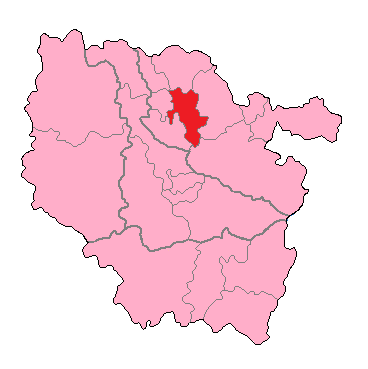
- Moselle's 3rd Constituency shown within Lorraine
- Deputy: Nathalie Colin-Oesterlé; LC
- Department: Moselle
- Cantons: Metz-I, Metz-II, Metz-III (Part), Pange, Vigy
- Registered voters: 74,064

The 3rd constituency of Moselle is a French legislative constituency in the Moselle département.

== Description ==
Moselle's 3rd constituency includes the centre of Metz and a large swath of more rural areas to the east. The constituency lies in the centre of Moselle to the east of the river Moselle, which flows through Metz.

The constituency has been held by parties of the Gaullist right from 1988 until 2017 and in that time was only represented by two individuals Jean Louis Masson and Marie-Jo Zimmermann.

== Historic Representation ==
Election	Member	Party
1986	Proportional representation – no election by constituency	
1988	Jean Louis Masson	RPR
1993	Jean Louis Masson	RPR
1997	Jean Louis Masson	RPR
1998	Marie-Jo Zimmermann	UMP
2002	Marie-Jo Zimmermann	UMP
2007	Marie-Jo Zimmermann	UMP
2012	Marie-Jo Zimmermann	UMP
2017	Richard Lioger	LREM
2022	Charlotte Leduc	LFI
2024	Nathalie Colin-Oesterlé	LC

== Election results ==
=== 2024 ===
Legislative Election 2024: Moselle's 3rd constituency
Party	Candidate	Votes	%	±%
RN	Victor Chomard	16,948	35.32	+16.95
LO	Etienne Hodara	699	1.46	N/A
LFI (NFP)	Charlotte Leduc	13,565	28.27	+4.00
LC	Nathalie Colin-Oesterlé	16,631	34.66	+24.13
NPA	Gaël Diaferia	143	0.30	N/A
Turnout		47,986	97.25	+52.05
Registered electors		76,057		
2nd round result
LC	Nathalie Colin-Oesterlé	29,657	61.78	+27.12
RN	Victor Chomard	18,347	38.22	+2.90
Turnout		48,004	96.38	−0.87
Registered electors		76,064		
LC gain from LFI				

=== 2022 ===
Legislative Election 2022: Moselle's 3rd constituency
Party	Candidate	Votes	%	±%
LFI (NUPÉS)	Charlotte Leduc	8,178	24.27	+3.15
RN	Françoise Grolet	6,192	18.37	+2.56
LREM (Ensemble)	Richard Lioger	5,012	14.87	−19.12
HOR	Marie-Jo Zimmermann*	4,540	13.47	N/A
LC (UDC)	Nathalie Colin-Oesterlé	3,550	10.53	−10.90
PS	Eric Gulino**	1,745	5.18	N/A
DVC	Anne-Catherine Leucart	1,662	4.93	N/A
REC	Christian Bemer	375	4.08	N/A
Others	N/A	1,445	-	−
Turnout		33,699	45.20	−0.21
2nd round result
LFI (NUPÉS)	Charlotte Leduc	14,012	51.46	N/A
RN	Françoise Grolet	13,215	48.54	N/A
Turnout		27,227	42.67	+3.33
LFI gain from LREM				

* Dissident Horizons member, not supported by party or Ensemble Citoyens alliance.

** Dissident PS member, not supported by party or NUPES alliance.

=== 2017 ===
Candidate	Label	First round		Second round	
Candidate	Label	Votes	%	Votes	%
Richard Lioger	REM	11,408	33.99	13,657	51.21
Marie-Jo Zimmermann	LR	7,195	21.43	13,013	48.79
Françoise Grolet	FN	5,308	15.81		
Denis Maciazek	FI	3,423	10.20		
Nathalie de Oliveira	PS	1,912	5.70		
Mathias Boquet	ECO	1,315	3.92		
Christine Singer	UDI	755	2.25		
Franck Monguillon	ECO	577	1.72		
Marie Marechal	PCF	436	1.30		
Maxime Louis	DIV	368	1.10		
Isabelle Catalan	DVG	238	0.71		
Sylvie Allais	DIV	229	0.68		
Lucas Fiorenza	REG	222	0.66		
Étienne Hodara	EXG	181	0.54		
Votes		33,567	100.00	26,670	100.00
Valid votes		33,567	98.14	26,670	90.01
Blank votes		471	1.38	2,163	7.30
Null votes		166	0.49	797	2.69
Turnout		34,204	45.41	29,630	39.34
Abstentions		41,113	54.59	45,693	60.66
Registered voters		75,317		75,323	
Source: Ministry of the Interior

=== 2012 ===
Legislative Election 2012: Moselle's 3rd constituency
Party	Candidate	Votes	%	±%
UMP	Marie-Jo Zimmermann	15,138	38.13	
PS	Christiane Pallez	13,368	33.67	
FN	Françoise Grolet	7,012	17.66	
FG	Jacques Marechal	1,579	3.98	
EELV	Claudine Urruty	912	2.30	
Others	N/A	1,695		
Turnout		39,704	53.60	
2nd round result
UMP	Marie-Jo Zimmermann	20,200	53.75	
PS	Christiane Pallez	17,380	46.25	
Turnout		37,580	50.74	
UMP hold				

== Sources ==
Official results of French elections from 2002: "Résultats électoraux officiels en France" (in French).
