= Laurent Dominati =

French politician

Member of the National Assembly for Paris's 1st constituency
- In office 1993–2002
- Preceded by: Jacques Dominati
- Succeeded by: Martine Billard

Personal details
- Born: 5 August 1960 (age 66) Paris, France
- Party: The Republicans
- Relations: Philippe Dominati (brother)
- Parent: Jacques Dominati (father)
- Education: Sciences Po

Laurent Dominati (born 5 August 1960) is a French politician.

== Early life ==
Dominati was born on August 5, 1960, in Paris, France. His father, Jacques Dominati, was a politician. His brother, Philippe Dominati, is a politician.

== Career ==
Dominati served as a member of the National Assembly from 1993 to 2002, representing Paris. He then served as Ambassador to Honduras from 2007 to 2010, and as Ambassador and Permanent Representative of France to the Council of Europe in Strasbourg from 2010 to 2013.
