= Karen R. Keesling =

United States Assistant Secretary of the Air Force (1946–2012)

Karen Ruth Keesling (July 9, 1946 – July 4, 2012) was the United States Assistant Secretary of the Air Force (Manpower & Reserve Affairs) from 1988 to 1989.

== Professional experience ==
Keesling was Assistant Dean of Women at the University of Kansas for 1971–72. From 1972 to 1975, Keesling worked in the Department of Health, Education, and Welfare as executive secretary of the Secretary's Advisory Commission on Rights and Responsibilities of Women. From 1975 to 1977, she was Director of the White House Office of Women. She was then a women's rights analyst in the Library of Congress's Civil Rights Division. She then attended the Georgetown University Law Center, receiving her J.D. in 1981. From 1979 to 1981, she was also a legislative aide of Sen. Nancy Landon Kassebaum (R–Kan.)

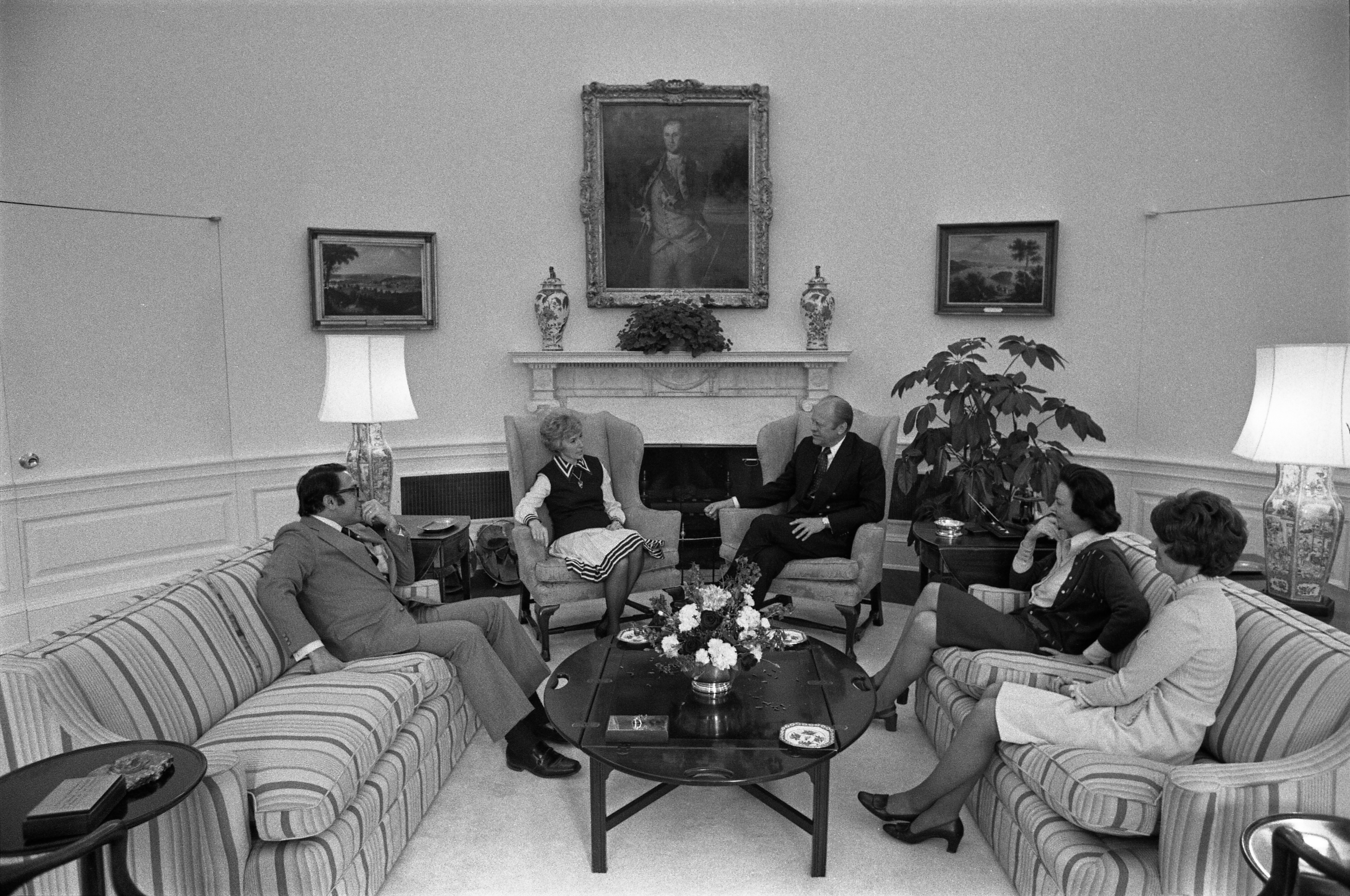
Karen Keesling in the White House with Patricia Lindh

== Work for the Air Force ==
In 1981, Keesling joined the United States Department of the Air Force, serving as Deputy for Equal Opportunity and Director of Equal Employment Opportunity, 1981–82; as Deputy Assistant Secretary of the Air Force for Manpower Resources and Military Personnel, 1982–83; Principal Deputy Assistant Secretary of the Air Force for Manpower, Reserve Affairs, and Installations, 1983–87; and as Principal Deputy Assistant Secretary of the Air Force for Readiness Support, 1987–89.

== Reagan administration ==
On September 7, 1988, President of the United States Ronald Reagan nominated Keesling to be Assistant Secretary of the Air Force (Manpower & Reserve Affairs). She held this position until 1989.

== Department of Labor ==
In the early 1990s, she joined the United States Department of Labor, serving as Acting Administrator of the Wage and Hour Division.

== Personal life ==
Karen R. Keesling was born in Wichita, Kansas, on July 9, 1946. She was educated at Arizona State University, receiving a B.A. in 1968 and an M.A. in 1970. She moved to Sun City, Arizona, in 2000 and practiced law there until her retirement in 2009. She died July 4, 2012, in Sun City.

Government offices
Preceded by Tidal W. McCoy	Assistant Secretary of the Air Force (Manpower & Reserve Affairs); 1988–1989	Succeeded by J. Gary Cooper
