= Sarah Chayes =

American journalist

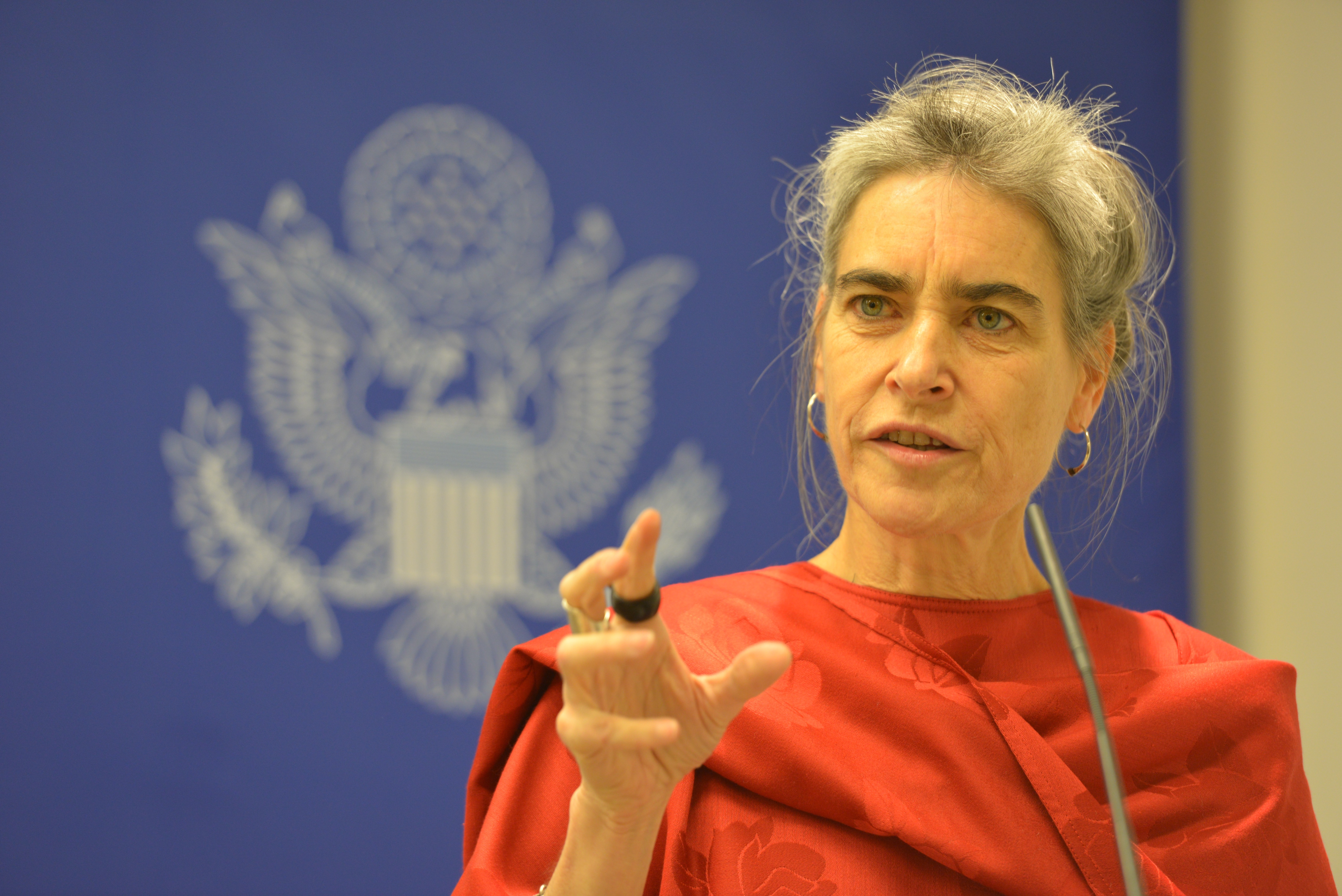
- Sarah Chayes, 2015
- Born: March 5, 1962 (age 64); Washington, D.C.
- Education: Harvard University
- Occupations: Journalist, political advisor
- Parent(s): Abram Chayes; Antonia Handler Chayes

Sarah Chayes (born March 5, 1962) is a former senior associate in the Democracy and Rule of Law Program at the Carnegie Endowment for International Peace (CEIP) and former reporter for National Public Radio (NPR), she also served as special advisor to the chairman of the Joint Chiefs of Staff.

== Background ==
Sarah Chayes is the daughter of the late law professor and Kennedy administration official Abram Chayes and lawyer and former undersecretary of the U.S. Air Force Antonia Handler Chayes. She is of Jewish descent. She graduated from Phillips Academy, Andover (1980) and Harvard University (1984) with a degree in history, magna cum laude. She was awarded the Radcliffe College History Prize. She then served in the Peace Corps in Morocco, returning to Harvard to earn a master's degree in history, specializing in the medieval Islamic period. Besides English, she speaks Pashto, French, and Arabic.

== Career ==
Chayes began her reporting career freelancing from Paris for The Christian Science Monitor Radio and other outlets. From 1996 to 2002, she served as Paris reporter for National Public Radio, covering France, the European Union, North Africa, and the Balkans. She earned 1999 Foreign Press Club and Sigma Delta Chi awards (together with other members of the NPR team) for her reporting on the Kosovo War. After covering the fall of the Taliban and the early weeks of post-Taliban Afghanistan in 2002, Chayes decided to leave reporting and stay behind to try to contribute to the rebuilding of the war-torn country.

Chayes lived in Kandahar, Afghanistan from 2002 to 2009. Having learned to speak Pashto, she helped rebuild homes and set up a dairy cooperative. In May 2005, she established the Arghand Cooperative, a venture that encourages local Afghan farmers to produce flowers, fruits, and herbs instead of opium poppies. The cooperative buys their almonds, pomegranate seeds, cumin and anise and artemisia and root dyes, extracts oils, essential oils, and tinctures from them, with which it produces soaps and other scented products for export. The cooperative is an associate member of the Natural Perfumers Guild. Chayes wrote an article detailing the story of the Arghand cooperative and her difficulties with the American aid establishment, which appeared in the December 2007 issue of The Atlantic.

Since leaving full-time radio reporting, she has been a frequent contributor to the print media, writing for Foreign Policy Magazine, the Los Angeles Times, The Atlantic, and the Washington Post, among other outlets. The Carnegie Endowment for International Peace maintains an archive of her writings.

Chayes has been a guest of PBS's Bill Moyers Journal, WHYY-FM's Terry Gross, WNYC's Leonard Lopate, MSNBC's Rachel Maddow Show, PBS's Charlie Rose, 2020 Bristol Festival of Ideas (UK), and various others.

=== Advisor to Joint Chiefs of Staff ===
In 2010, Chayes became a special advisor to the chairman of the Joint Chiefs of Staff, Admiral Mike Mullen. In this capacity, she contributed to strategic US policy on Afghanistan, Pakistan, and the Arab Spring.

=== Carnegie Endowment for International Peace ===
Sarah Chayes is a senior fellow in Carnegie's Democracy and Rule of Law program. At Carnegie, Chayes has launched a corruption and security initiative, which analyzes the structure of kleptocratic governments around the world, the other risk factors with which public corruption is interacting in specific countries, the likelihood of a significant security event resulting, and potential approaches available to different local and international actors. She conducts significant field research on this topic, hosts speakers and workshops, both in the U.S. and in relevant countries, and speaks and writes frequently.

== Books and other works ==
External videos
- Presentation by Chayes on The Punishment of Virtue, C-SPAN
- Interview with Chayes on Thieves of State, April 9, 2016, C-SPAN

Chayes is the author of The Punishment of Virtue: Inside Afghanistan After the Taliban (2006) and Thieves of State: Why Corruption Threatens Global Security (2014); as well as On Corruption in America: And What Is at Stake (2020).

In January 2009, Chayes wrote Comprehensive Action Plan for Afghanistan, an analysis of the dilemma in Afghanistan ca. 2009 and a plan for its resolution.

In a 2011 op-ed published in the Los Angeles Times, Chayes decried the "rampant public corruption" in Afghanistan, asserting that the country "is controlled by a structured, mafiaesque system, in which money flows upward via purchase of office, kickbacks or 'sweets' in return for permission to extract resources . . . and protection."

In another 2012 op-ed piece published in the Los Angeles Times, Chayes argued that the controversial Innocence of Muslims video may not be protected under the U.S. Constitution's First Amendment free speech guarantees. She contended that speech deliberately tailored in content and manner to provoke a violent reaction differs from speech that is merely offensive.

During the October 6, 2021 episode of the BBC's Thinking Allowed (on post-occupation Afghanistan), Chayes was highly critical of the corrupt example of "democracy" set by the US for Afghans and others to follow.

== See also ==
- Debbie Rodriguez
- Rory Stewart
- Economic development
- International development
