= On Corruption in America: And What Is at Stake =

2021 book

- Front cover page of the book.
- Author: Sarah Chayes
- Language: English
- Publisher: Vintage Books
- Publication date: November 16, 2021
- Publication place: United States
- Pages: 432
- ISBN: 978-0525563938

On Corruption in America: And What Is at Stake is a non-fiction book by an author, journalist, and international expert on corruption, Sarah Chayes about corruption in the United States. The book was released on November 16, 2021. In this book, Chayes writes about how corrupt systems are organized, laws are changed by bad actors to cover their crimes, and the government is determined by these same bad actors.

== Author ==
Sarah Chayes (born March 5, 1962) is a former senior associate in the Democracy and Rule of Law Program at the Carnegie Endowment for International Peace and former reporter for National Public Radio, she also served as special advisor to the Chairman of the Joint Chiefs of Staff. At Carnegie, Chayes had launched a project on corruption and security, in which she analyzes the structure of authoritarian governments around the world, corruption, and its consequences, the impact of corruption on the possibility of creating crises such as terrorism, revolutions, and their violent consequences, and environmental destruction. She has done considerable field research on this topic. She received the Radcliffe College History Prize in 1984, Foreign Press Club and Sigma Delta Chi awards (together with other members of the NPR team) for her reporting on the Kosovo War in 1999.

== Content ==
Chayes stated in her interview with Noel King that the overturning of Governor Bob McDonnell's conviction by Supreme Court of the United States turned her to writing this book.

In her book, she classifies America's corruption into two periods. The first period began lifting off roughly from 1870 to 1900, known as the Gilded Age. Where money defined our social status instead of providing our security and comfort and our children in life. She called it the Midas disease. Where sufferers want to turn everything mountains, lands, waters even love into gold and add zeros to their bank accounts. She believed that three major disasters in the first half of the 20th century - World War I and II, and the Great Depression – ended America's Gilded Age. The traumas of World War II changed political attitudes and led to New Deal of Franklin D. Roosevelt and new progressive changes were made possible, including the high-income tax rate of rich Americans up to 92% and the lower salaries of corporate heads than today. But from 1980, the Ronald Reagan years (1981-89), a new Gilded Age began. She brings up that during these years, the Reagan era and his revolution caused deregulation, weakening the middle class and proud members of America. As a result, since 2000, corporate heads who were paid about 20 times the middle worker's income in 1950 have been earning more than 300 times the middle worker's income and the top income tax rate paid by the highest-earning Americans today is less than it is 45 percent. Chayes identifies corruption as the result of the abuse of positions of power for personal gain rather than the public good, either in the private or public sector. Americans know corruption in the form of rich people who own the political system.

She compared the corruption network to a hydra. At first look, each head seems to be doing its job independently, but in reality, all the heads are connected to one body. They may not be doing anything wrong on their own, but they are acting to the advantage of this larger network. Also, if you cut off one head, not only will it not be destroyed, but two heads will grow instead. So, in many anti-corruption insurrections, the government falls, but the network can immediately appoint a new head to replace the previous one.

== Reviews ==
Robert G. Kaiser of The Washington Post described Chayes's book as a good one that paints a wide image with brave brushstrokes.

Nancy MacLean said: "If you want to save America, this might just be the most important book to read now".

== See also ==
- Fear: Trump in the White House
- Nothing, and So Be It
