= Sylvain Maillard =

French politician (born 1974)

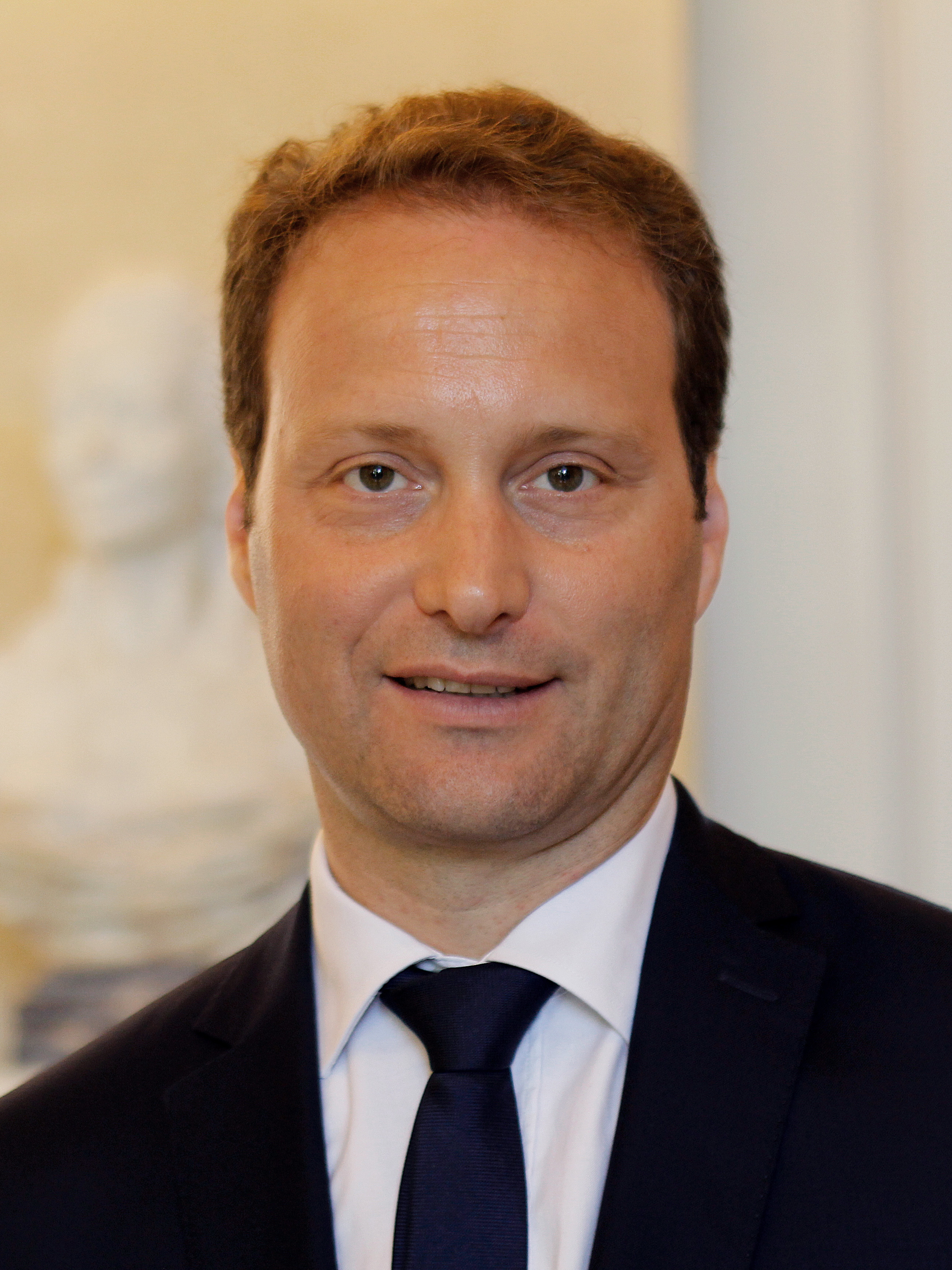

Member of the National Assembly for Paris's 1st constituency
- Incumbent
- Assumed office 21 June 2017
- Preceded by: Pierre Lellouche
- Majority: 13,609 (31.14%)

President of the Renaissance group in the National Assembly
- In office 26 July 2023 – 9 June 2024
- Preceded by: Aurore Bergé
- Succeeded by: Gabriel Attal

Personal details
- Born: 28 April 1974 (age 52) Saint-Maur-des-Fossés, France
- Party: UDF (until 2007); New Centre (2007–2012); UDI (2012–2016); Renaissance (since 2016)
- Education: Grenoble School of Management; LMU Munich

Sylvain Maillard (French pronunciation: [silvɛ̃ majaʁ]; born 28 April 1974) is a French entrepreneur and politician serving both as the member of the National Assembly for the 1st constituency of Paris since 2017 and as the Renaissance group leader in the Assembly from 2023 to 2024. A member of Renaissance (RE), his constituency encompasses the 1st, 2nd, 8th and part of the 9th arrondissement.

In early October 2021, Maillard was named in the Pandora Papers

== Early life and career ==
Maillard grew up in Versailles, Yvelines and went on to study accounting and auditing at ICS Bégué in Paris and obtained in 1998, the specialized master's degree "Entrepreneurs-Pedagogy HEC Entrepreneurs" from Grenoble School of Management. Participating in the Erasmus programme, he studied political science at LMU Munich. In December 1999, he began his national service in Stuttgart as a cooperant abroad.

Maillard returned to France in April 2001, creating the company Alantys Technology, a company specializing in the distribution of electronic components, in Argenteuil in the Val d'Oise, then several of its subsidiaries. The company is still active as of 2019.

== Political career ==
A successive member of the Union for French Democracy, New Centre and the Union of Democrats and Independents, Maillard has been a councilor in the 9th arrondissement of Paris since 2014. After joining La Republique En Marche! he was elected deputy in Paris's 1st constituency during the legislative elections of 2017, one of only four lawmakers elected in the first round.

In parliament, Maillard serves on the Committee on Social Affairs. In addition to his committee assignments, he is part of the French delegation to the Franco-German Parliamentary Assembly and a member of the French-German Parliamentary Friendship Group and the French-Israeli Parliamentary Friendship Group. He also chairs a working group on ways to fight antisemitism. In 2018, he joined an informal group of around 50 LREM members in support of strengthening entrepreneurship.

In a ranking published by Le Parisien in early 2021, Maillard was ranked as one of the most active members of the National Assembly between 2017 and 2020.

In late 2022, Maillard acted as interim leader of the Renaissance parliamentary group during Aurore Bergé's maternity leave. In July 2023, he announced his candidacy to succeed Bergé as the group's chair and was subsequently elected with 80 percent over the other candidate, Frédéric Descrozaille (20%).

== Political positions ==
In July 2019, Maillard voted in favor of the French ratification of the European Union's Comprehensive Economic and Trade Agreement (CETA) with Canada.

On Maillard's initiative, a majority in the National Assembly agreed in December 2019 on a non-legally binding resolution modeled on the definition of antisemitism set by the International Holocaust Remembrance Alliance (IHRA).

== Controversy ==
In 2021, Maillard filed a complaint for defamation against the newspaper Le Monde after it had linked him to a financial structure in the Seychelles as part of the Pandora Papers revelations.
