= Jean-Marie Le Chevallier =

French politician (1936–2020)

Mayor of Toulon
- In office 25 June 1995 – 25 March 2001
- Preceded by: François Trucy
- Succeeded by: Hubert Falco

Member of the National Assembly for Var's 1st constituency
- In office 12 June 1997 – 6 February 1998
- Preceded by: Daniel Colin
- Succeeded by: Odette Casanova

Personal details
- Born: 22 November 1936 Sceaux, France
- Died: 30 October 2020 (aged 83) Vendée
- Party: National Front
- Spouse: Cendrine Le Chevallier

Jean-Marie Le Chevallier (French pronunciation: [ʒɑ̃ maʁi lə ʃəvalje]; 22 November 1936 – 30 October 2020) was a French politician.

== Early life ==
Jean-Marie Le Chevallier was born on 22 November 1936 in Sceaux, near Paris.

== Career ==
Le Chevallier started his career as Jacques Dominati's parliamentary assistant. He was introduced to Jean-Marie Le Pen by Dominati, who was one of his personal friends. Le Chevallier subsequently joined Le Pen's National Front. He served as a member of the National Assembly representing the Var from 1997 to 1998. However, he was forced to step down due to campaign finance violations.

He also served as the mayor of Toulon from 1995 to 1999.

== Personal life ==
He was married to Cendrine Chéreil de la Rivière, who ran for the National Assembly and lost. They lived in Marrakesh, Morocco, for several years. As of 2009, he resided in an apartment at the Quai Louis-Blériot in the 16th arrondissement of Paris.

He died on 30 October 2020.

== Bibliography ==
- Le Chevallier à découvert, Jean-Pierre Thiollet, Ed. Laurens, 1998. ISBN 2-911838-51-3
