= Tidal W. McCoy =

American politician (born 1945)

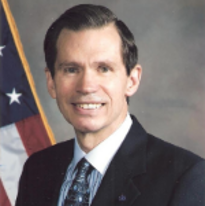
- Official portrait, 1984

Assistant Secretary of the Air Force (Manpower & Reserve Affairs)
- In office 1981–1988
- President: Ronald Reagan
- Preceded by: Antonia Handler Chayes
- Succeeded by: Karen R. Keesling

Personal details
- Born: April 25, 1945 (age 81) Gainesville, Florida, U.S.
- Party: Republican
- Education: United States Military Academy (BS); George Washington University (MS)

Military service
- Allegiance: United States
- Branch/service: United States Army
- Years of service: 1967–1972
- Unit: 2nd Battalion, 83rd Field Artillery Regiment
- Commands: Battery B, 2nd Battalion, 83rd Field Artillery Regiment

Tidal W. "Ty" McCoy (born April 25, 1945) is an American venture capitalist and politician. He was Assistant Secretary of the Air Force (Manpower & Reserve Affairs) during the Reagan administration from 1981 to 1989.

== Early life and education ==
McCoy was born in Gainesville, Florida, on April 25, 1945. He attended the United States Military Academy at West Point, receiving a B.S. in engineering in 1967 and an M.S. in Business Financial Management from George Washington University in 1975.

== Career ==
=== Military service ===
After graduating from West Point, McCoy was deployed to Germany as a battery commander of the 2nd Battalion, 83rd Field Artillery Regiment, serving as the battery commander for Battery B, a nuclear artillery battery. He was then deployed to the Republic of Vietnam, where he held command and staff positions for a year before assignment to the Pentagon as the Chief of Intelligence on North Vietnam, providing intelligence reports to the U.S. Secretary of Defense and the Chairman of the Joint Chiefs of Staff.

=== Public service ===
In 1972, McCoy was recruited by the Central Intelligence Agency, but was recalled by the Secretary of Defense for an assignment to the Immediate Office of the Secretary of Defense as part of the Long Range Planning and Net Assessment Group in the Office of the United States Secretary of Defense. From 1973 to 1977, he was a staff assistant and later a deputy assistant to the Secretary of Defense. During that time, he also served at the National Security Council at the White House. In 1977, he was the Scientific Advisor to Assistant Secretary of the Navy for Research, Engineering and Systems, David E. Mann. From 1979 to 1981, he was Assistant for National Security Affairs to Senator Jake Garn of Utah.

In April 1981, President Ronald Reagan nominated McCoy to be Assistant Secretary of the Air Force (Manpower & Reserve Affairs); McCoy was unanimously confirmed by the Senate on June 4, 1981, and held that office throughout the Reagan Administration. For a period of time he was also Acting Under Secretary and Acting Secretary of the Air Force.

=== Private sector ===
After leaving government service in 1989, McCoy worked for Thiokol as Senior Vice President for government relations.

In late 2017, McCoy co-founded the venture capital firm Iron Gate Capital Advisors, which he said focused on cyber warfare.

Political offices
| Preceded by Toni Chayes | Assistant Secretary of the Air Force for Manpower and Reserve Affairs; 1981–1988 | Succeeded by Karen Keesling |
