= Antonia Handler Chayes =

American lawyer and legal scholar (born 1929)

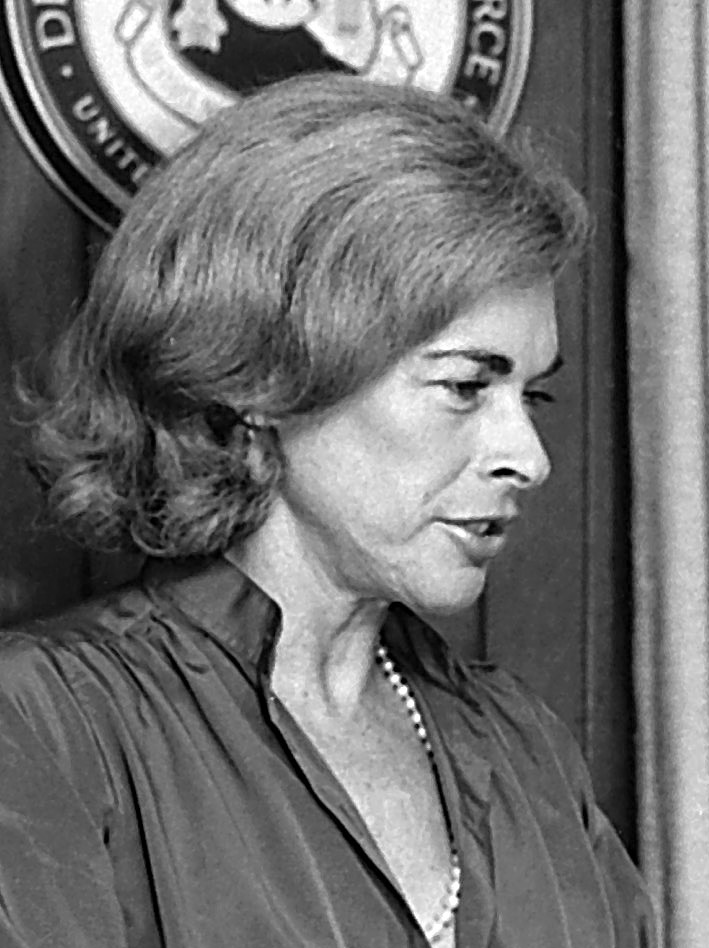

14th United States Under Secretary of the Air Force
- In office May 1, 1979 – January 20, 1981
- President: Jimmy Carter
- Preceded by: Hans Mark
- Succeeded by: Edward C. Aldridge Jr.

Personal details
- Born: July 21, 1929 (age 97) New York City, U.S.
- Party: Democratic
- Spouse: Abram Chayes (m. 1947; died 2000)
- Children: Sarah Chayes and 4 other children
- Education: Radcliffe College (BA); Georgetown University (JD)

Antonia "Toni" Handler Chayes (born July 21, 1929) is an American lawyer and legal scholar who served as Assistant Secretary of the Air Force (Manpower and Reserve Affairs) from 1977 to 1979 and as United States Under Secretary of the Air Force from 1979 to 1981.

== Biography ==
Antonia Handler was born in New York City on July 21, 1929. She married Abram Chayes on December 24, 1947; they had five children, including journalist Sarah Chayes. She was educated at Radcliffe College, receiving a B.A. in 1950. She then attended Yale Law School before transferring to the Georgetown University Law Center and receiving her law degree in 1953.

From 1959 to 1961, Chayes was executive assistant to Erwin Griswold, the Dean of Harvard Law School. In 1961, she joined the staff of the White House, where she worked drafting correspondence. She was then a consultant to a Baltimore community development firm 1962-63, and a social science adviser to the National Institute of Mental Health 1964-65. From 1966 to 1968, she was director of education and urban development for the Model Cities Program's Action for Boston Community Development program. In 1968, she became the dean of the Jackson College for Women (later incorporated into Tufts University). From 1970 to 1972, she was an associate professor of political science at Tufts. Chayes then spent 1972-73 as the law clerk of Judge Charles Edward Wyzanski Jr. of the United States District Court for the District of Massachusetts. In 1974, she joined the Boston law firm of Csaplar & Bok as a partner.

=== Carter Administration ===
In 1977, President of the United States Jimmy Carter nominated Chayes to be Assistant Secretary of the Air Force (Manpower and Reserve Affairs). She held this position until 1979, when she became United States Under Secretary of the Air Force, a position she held until 1981.

After leaving the Carter Administration, Chayes joined the faculty of the John F. Kennedy School of Government in 1981, teaching there until 2003. There, she became Chair of the Project on Compliance and International Conflict Management at the Program on Negotiation. She also served on the Board of Directors of the United Technologies Corporation from 1981 to 2002. She also continued to practice law with Csaplar & Bok. In 2003, she became Professor of Practice of International Politics and Law at The Fletcher School of Law and Diplomacy.

== Selected works ==
- with Paul M. Doty, Defending Deterrence: Managing the ABM Treaty Regime Into the 21st Century (Brassey's, 1989).
- with Abram Chayes, The New Sovereignty: Compliance with International Regulating Agreements (Cambridge, MA: Harvard University Press, 1995).
- with George T. Raach, eds., Peace Operations: Developing an American Strategy (Washington, DC: National Defense University Press, 1995).
- with Abram Chayes, Preventing Conflict in the Post-Communist World: Mobilizing International and Regional Organizations (Washington, DC: Brookings, 1996).
- with Abram Chayes, Alexei Arbatov, and Lara Olson, eds., Managing Conflict in the Former Soviet Union (Cambridge, MA: MIT Press, 1997).
- with Abram Chayes, Planning for Intervention: International Cooperation in Conflict Management (The Hague: Kluwer Law International, 1999).
- with Martha Minow, eds., Imagine Coexistence: Restoring Humanity After Violent Conflict (San Francisco, CA: 2003).
- "How American Treaty Behavior Threatens National Security" in 33 International Security 45 (2008).
- Borderless Wars: Civil Military Disorder and Legal Uncertainty (New York, NY: Cambridge University Press, 2015).

Government offices
Preceded by ???	Assistant Secretary of the Air Force (Manpower & Reserve Affairs); 1977 – 1979	Succeeded by Tidal W. McCoy
Preceded by Hans Mark	United States Under Secretary of the Air Force; 1979 – 1981	Succeeded by Edward C. Aldridge Jr.
