= Martine Billard =

French politician (born 1952)

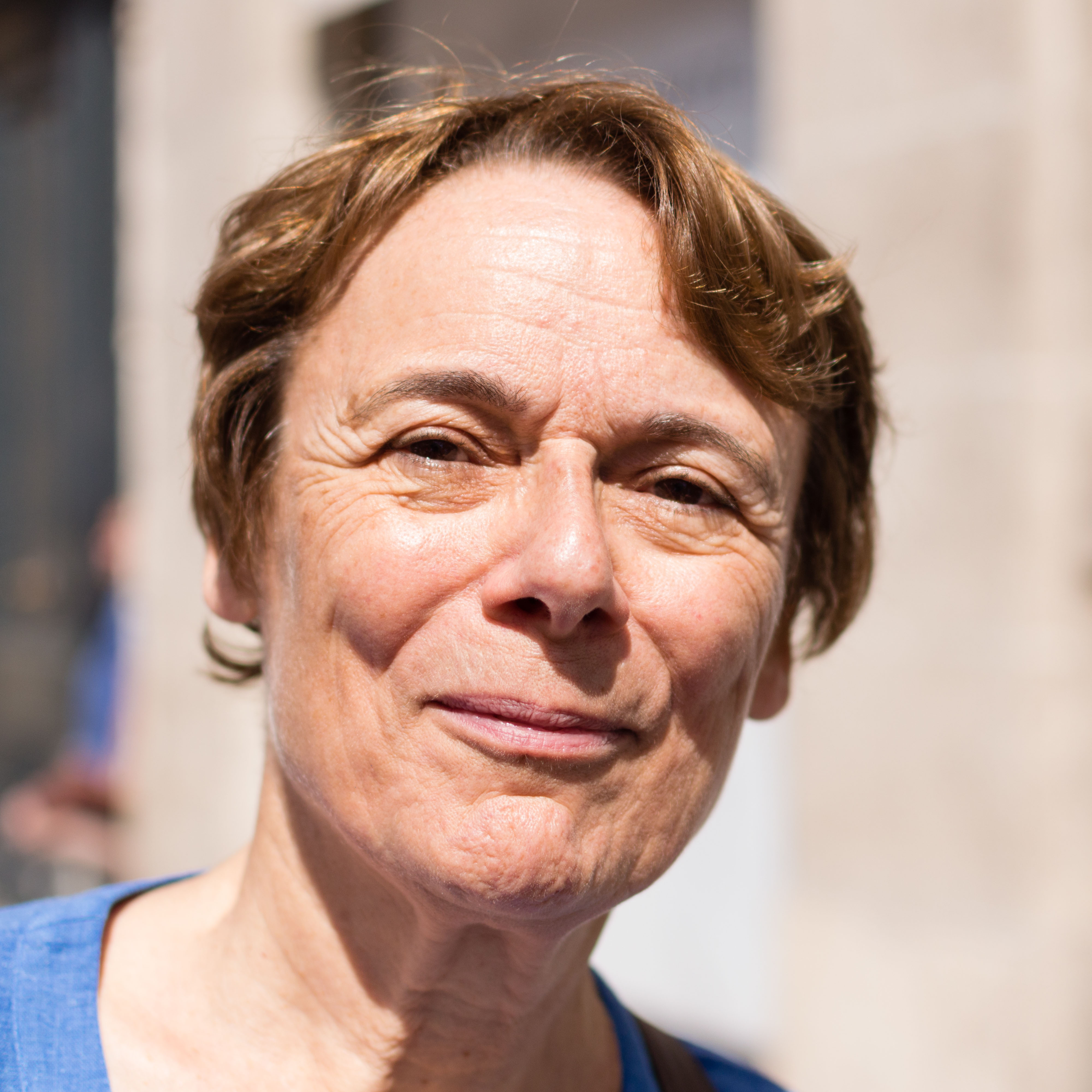
- Martine Billard in 2017

Member of the National Assembly for Paris's 1st constituency
- In office 19 June 2002 – 20 June 2012
- Preceded by: Laurent Dominati
- Succeeded by: Pierre Lellouche

Personal details
- Born: 7 October 1952 (age 73) Boulogne-Billancourt (Hauts-de-Seine), France
- Party: Left Party
- Education: Panthéon-Assas University
- Profession: Librarian

Martine Billard (born 7 October 1952 in Boulogne-Billancourt, Hauts-de-Seine) is a French politician and a deputy to the National Assembly of France. She is a member of the Parti de Gauche.

== Biography ==
Billard entered politics in May 1968 with the "comité d'action lycéen". She studied economics at Panthéon-Assas University, and campaigned against far-right movements, which were especially active there.

In the 1970s, she joined the feminist movement, and was active in the pro-choice movement, and against right-wing dictatorships in Latin America.

After graduating in economics, she had several small jobs, and campaigned with far-left movements, against nuclear energy and in favour of Palestine against Zionism in the 1980s.

She joined Les Verts ("the Greens"), the French ecologist party, in 1993. Between 1995 and 2001, she held the position of representative of the twentieth arrondissement on the City Council of Paris. Between 1996 and 1997, she was spokesperson for Les Verts in Paris.

In 1999 and 2000, she was elected to the National Council of Les Verts, and became the national spokesperson of the party, and a member of the executive council of Les Verts for economic and social matters.

In 2001, she was a candidate in the elections for the first arrondissement, and was defeated by a large margin.

As a candidate of the Gauche unie ("United Left"), she was elected on 16 June 2002 for the twelfth term (2002–2007) in the first circonscription of Paris, defeating Jean-François Legaret, mayor of the first arrondissement (and candidate of the UMP). Her victory came as a surprise, since she was elected in one of the wealthiest constituencies of Paris, usually a stronghold of the Right. As a matter of fact, she was defeated by a large margin in the first and fourth arrondissements, which have a conservative or liberal majority, but compensated with the left-leaning middle classes of the second and third arrondissements (the so-called "bourgeois bohemians").

In April 2005, she condemned, as "twin brothers" within Les Verts, the "small group of hysterics of the Arab cause" and the "Hysterics of the Jewish Defence League".

During the referendum on the Treaty establishing a Constitution for Europe, she advocated opposing the Treaty, against the position of her party. Her constituency eventually voted massively in favour of the Treaty.

In 2005 and 2006, she worked on the DADVSI law project, trying to influence it toward more friendliness for Internet users.

On 8 July 2009, she left the Greens, and in December 2009, she joined the Left Party.

== Offices held ==
- 19 June 1995 – 18 March 2001: Member of the City Council of Paris
