= Marie-Jo Zimmermann =

French politician

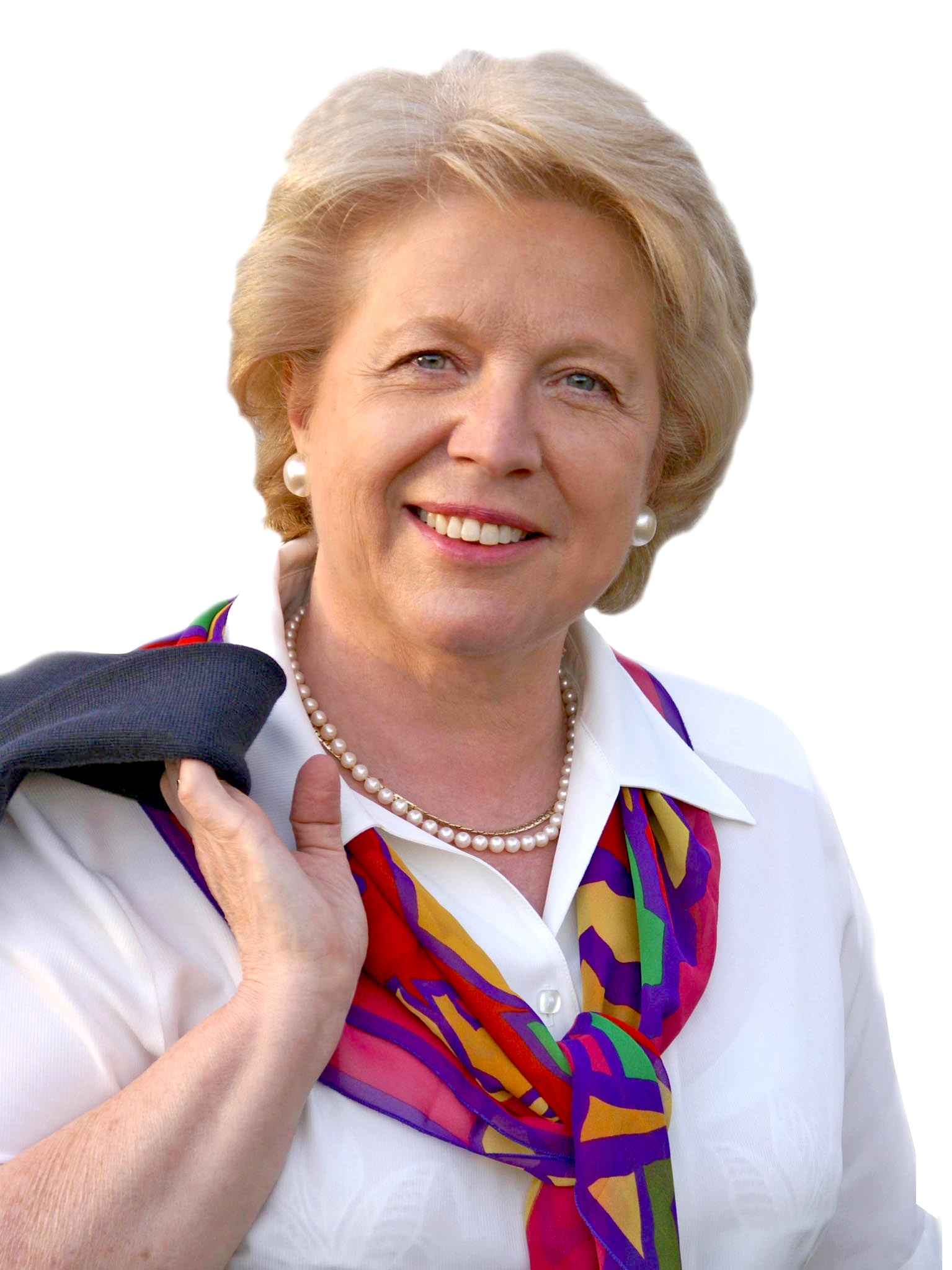

Marie-Jo Zimmermann (born 29 April 1951) is a French politician who was a Member of Parliament, for the Union for a Popular Movement (UMP) party, between 1998 and 2017. She represented Moselle's 3rd constituency.

She was born in the town of Creutzwald, in Moselle.

In 1998, she was elected to represent Moselle in the French National Assembly, and was re-elected for the same constituency in 2002, 2007 and 2012. She has been the president of the Assembly's group on women's rights, and has been sitting on the commission for Cultural Affairs. She failed to be re-elected in 2017.

From 1998 to 2001, she was also a member of the regional council for Lorraine, and from 1989 to 2002, she served as a member of the town council for Metz.
