= Erik Lindh =

Erik Lindh may refer to:

- Erik Lindh (table tennis) (born 1964)
- Erik Lindh (sailor) (1865–1912)
- Erik Torsten Lindh (1941–2020), Swedish Navy officer
- Johan Erik Lindh (1793–1865), Swedish painter
