= Patricia Lindh =

American activist (1928–2004)

Patricia Lindh (October 2, 1928 – July 19, 2004) was an American activist and a member of the Republican Party. She was an advisor to presidents Richard Nixon and Gerald Ford in the 1970s and worked as Special Assistant to the Counsellor for Women's Programs in the mid-1970s.

== Early life ==
Lindh was born on October 2, 1928 in Toledo, Ohio. Growing up in Cleveland and Chicago, she studied at Trinity College in Hartford and graduated in 1950. She married an executive of an international oil company, moving with him to Singapore, Pakistan and Kuwait from 1955 to 1965.

== Involvement with the Republican Party ==
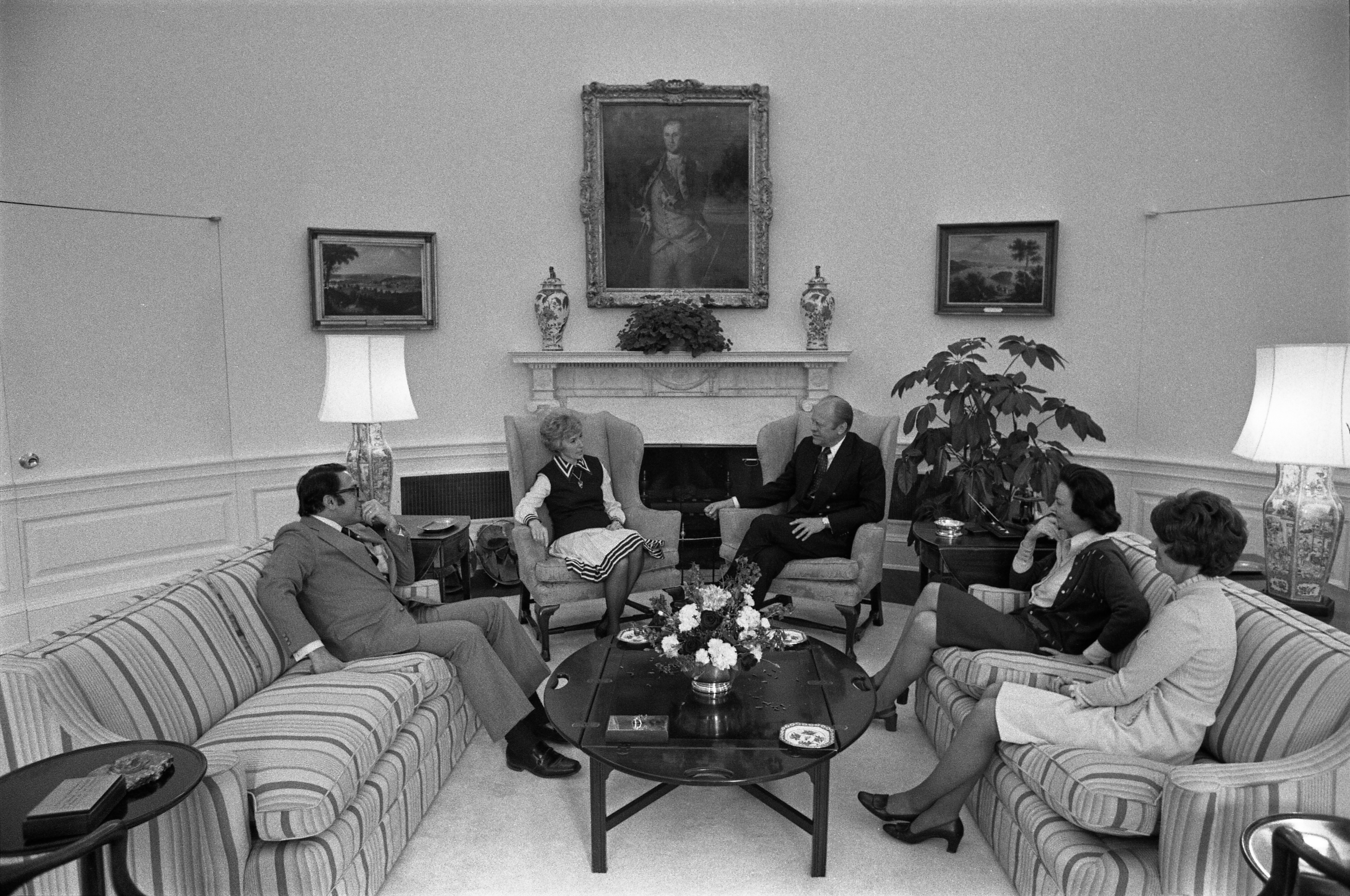
President Gerald R. Ford and First Lady Betty Ford Meeting with Patricia Lindh and Karen Keesling in the Oval Office for International Women's Year in the Oval Office

Lindh served as the Republican National Committeewoman for the State of Louisiana. In 1972, she served as a delegate the Republican Convention and also worked as a member of the Platform committee.

== Advisor to presidents ==
=== Richard Nixon ===
Lindh worked for the Nixon administration where she began her tenure in the White House advising on women's issues. In June 1974, she replaced Jill Ruckelshaus as special assistant for women's programs.

Lindh was quoted as saying she believed Watergate would not have happened if there had been a woman president saying, "I think women have a higher moral sense of what is right or wrong. I think women have more moral sensitivity than men."

=== Gerald Ford ===
In 1974, Lindh worked as the Special Assistant to the Counsellor for Women's Progress for President Gerald Ford. Lindh succeeded Anne Armstrong in December 1974. Lindh believed solidarity amongst women was of the utmost importance and publicly worked towards this goal. In 1975, she said women must work together and in her role as the first special assistant for women working for a U.S. president, she believed, "from NOW to the DAR, from Planned Parenthood to the Council of Catholic Women," women should work together towards a shared goal of equality.

The press picked up on her sense of humor. In 1976, she told a reporter from the Oakland Tribune she was a "newcomer to Disneyland on the Potomac." In 1976, Lindh was named deputy assistant Secretary of State for education and public affairs.

== Support for the Equal Rights Amendment ==
Lindh was a supporter of the Equal Rights Amendment (ERA) as were many Republican women who worked in the White House in the mid-1970s, including First Lady Betty Ford. Lindh was active in the campaign for the amendment in the state of Louisiana.

Lindh's support for the ERA brought the ire of Phyllis Schlafly who wrote her a letter critiquing the ERA in 1974. In the letter, Schlafly shared concerns her daughter would be drafted into war if the ERA were ratified.

== 1975 International Women's Year Conference ==
Lindh was selected as a delegate to the 1975 International Women's Year Conference in Mexico City. She was quoted in the press saying the Ford administration had allocated $350,000 in funding for the conference. She also noted that the U.S. funding was significantly behind the $2 million allocated by Canada and Australia.

== Personal life ==
Lindh was from Toledo, Ohio and spent years in Louisiana. She was a graduate of Trinity College, graduating in 1950. Lindh was married to H. Robert "Bob" Lindh Jr., an executive who worked in the oil industry. Due to her husband's job, in the 1950s and 1960s, she lived abroad for 10 years in Kuwait, Singapore and Pakistan. In the 1980s, she worked as a public relations executive at Bank of America. She died of lung cancer in 2004.
