= Daniel Colin =

French politician (1933–2019)

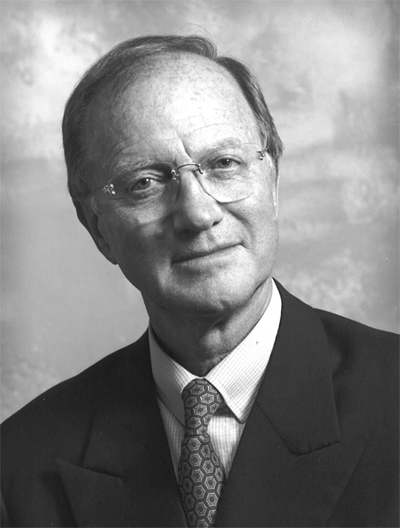
- Portrait of Daniel Colin

Member of the National Assembly for Var
- In office 1986–1997
- Succeeded by: Jean-Marie Le Chevallier

Personal details
- Born: 30 September 1933 Paris, France
- Died: 15 June 2019 (aged 85) Toulon, France
- Party: Republican Party
- Children: Nathalie Colin-Oesterlé

Daniel Colin (30 September 1933 – 15 June 2019) was a French politician who was a deputy from 1986 to 1997.
