= Deborah Rodriguez (writer) =

American novelist

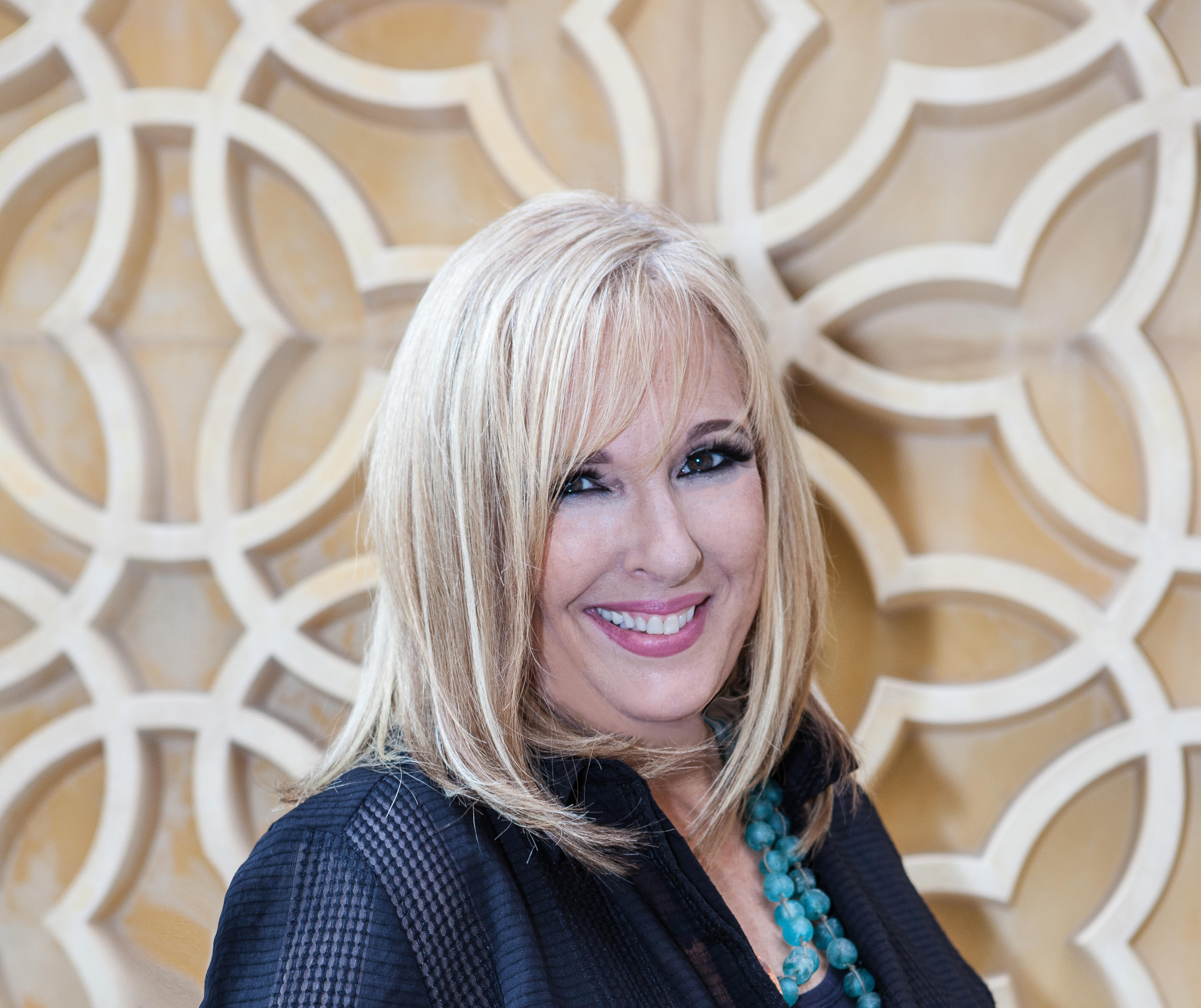
- Born: Deborah Rodriguez
- Occupations: Novelist, hairdresser
- Writing career
- Period: 2007–present
- Genres: Non-fiction, biography/autobiography, memoir, realistic fiction
- Notable work: Kabul Beauty School
- Website: deborahrodriguez.com

Deborah "Debbie" Rodriguez is an American writer, hairdresser, and humanitarian. She is noted for creating safe spaces that provide women with a way out of domestic violence and chaotic circumstances.

== Biography ==
In 2001, Deborah Rodriguez went to Afghanistan as part of a group offering aid after the fall of the Taliban. There, she helped found a beauty school that trained 200 women in the art of hairdressing, many of whom went on to run their own salons, giving them the opportunity to start their own business and provide for their families. She later opened a coffee shop in Kabul.

In 2002, Rodriguez married an Afghan, Samer (Sam) Mohammad Abdul Khan, who worked for Afghan warlord Abdul Rashid Dostum. At the time he had a wife in Saudi Arabia, who became pregnant with his eighth child while he was married to Rodriguez. The marriage with Rodriguez was reported as a happy one as late as April 2007, but soon after, she had to flee Afghanistan.

Rodriguez wrote two bestselling books based on her experiences in Afghanistan, The Kabul Beauty School and The Little Coffee Shop of Kabul, as well as Return to the Little Coffee Shop of Kabul. At one point, Kabul Beauty School was slated to become a movie, with Sandra Bullock playing the lead.

As of 2014, Rodriguez lives in Mazatlán, Mexico, where she is the owner of Tippy Toes Salon and Marrakesh Spa, and where she established Project Mariposa, providing funding for young women to attend beauty school, with the goal of helping them become independent and self-supporting. Margarita Wednesdays (The House on Carnaval Street), a book detailing her journey to remake her life after being forced to leave Afghanistan, was released in June 2014. Her other books include the novels The Zanzibar Wife, and The Moroccan Daughter.

As of 2021, Rodriguez has been working to help 130 Afghans, including former staff and beauty school students, leave Afghanistan. As the president of the non-profit Oasis Rescue, she is raising money to support efforts for Afghans who are seeking to leave the country, as well as those who have left and find themselves in need.

Some controversy followed the publishing of Kabul Beauty School. Other women who were also involved at the founding of the Kabul Beauty School say the book is filled with inaccuracies and inconsistencies, that events did not unfold the way Rodriguez depicts them. Though it was acknowledged that some personal, place and organization names were changed in the book, and some chronological details adjusted. Some of the women who worked at the beauty school said that, because of the publication of the book and the details it revealed about them, their lives had been put in danger. Some also claimed that Rodriguez had not made good on promises for financial support and other help. However, Rodriguez claims that she was careful to protect the identities of the women mentioned in the book, and that they were all enthusiastic about telling their stories knowing that was the case.

Farewell to the Little Coffee Shop of Kabul was longlisted in 2025 for the International Dublin Literary Award.

== Publications ==
=== Non-fiction ===
- Kabul Beauty School: An American Woman Goes Behind the Veil (1 January 2007, Hodder: ISBN 9780340935880)
- Margarita Wednesdays: Making a New Life by the Mexican Sea (10 June 2014, Gallery Books: ISBN 9781476710679) (published as The House on Carnaval Street in some countries)

=== Fiction ===
- The Little Coffee Shop of Kabul (2012, Sphere: ISBN 978-0751550405)
- Return to the Little Coffee Shop of Kabul (2016, Sphere: ISBN 978-0751561463)
- The Zanzibar Wife (2018, Sphere: ISBN 978-0751561487)
- Island on the Edge of the World (2019, Sphere: ISBN 9780751574586)
- The Moroccan Daughter (2021, Bantam: ISBN 9780143793625)
- Farewell to the Little Coffee Shop of Kabul (2023, Sphere, ISBN 978-1408728093)

== See also ==
- Abdul Rashid Dostum
- Greg Mortenson
- Sarah Chayes
- Ministry of Women's Affairs (Afghanistan)
- Women in Afghanistan
