= Nathalie Colin-Oesterlé =

French lawyer and politician (born 1965)

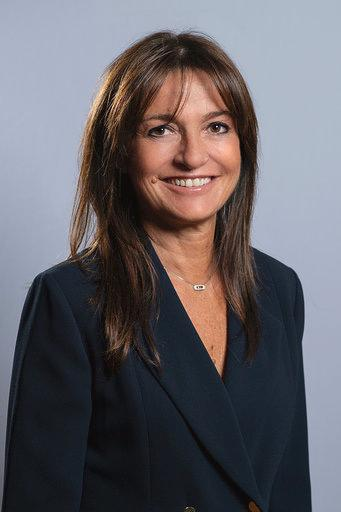

Member of the National Assembly for Moselle's 3rd constituency
- Incumbent
- Assumed office 18 July 2024
- Preceded by: Charlotte Leduc

Member of the European Parliament for France
- In office 2 July 2019 – 15 July 2024

Personal details
- Born: 5 May 1965 (age 61) Ollioules, France
- Party: The Centrists
- Relations: Daniel Colin (father)
- Children: 3
- Education: Panthéon-Assas University
- Profession: Lawyer

Nathalie Colin-Oesterlé (born 5 May 1965) is a French lawyer and politician of The Centrists who served as a Member of the European Parliament from 2019 to 2024. She elected deputy of the National Assembly in the 2024 legislative election.

== Political career ==
Since 2001, Colin-Oesterlé has been a member of the municipal council of Metz.

After joining the European Parliament in the 2019 elections, Colin-Oesterlé served on the Committee on the Environment, Public Health and Food Safety. She later also joined the Special Committee on Beating Cancer (2020) and the Special Committee on the COVID-19 pandemic (2022). From 2021, she was part of the Parliament's delegation to the Conference on the Future of Europe.

In addition to her committee assignments, Colin-Oesterlé was part of the Parliament's delegations for relations to Israel and to the Parliamentary Assembly of the Union for the Mediterranean. She was also a member of the European Parliament Intergroup on Climate Change, Biodiversity and Sustainable Development and the MEPs Against Cancer group.
