= Abram Chayes =

American legal scholar (1922–2000)

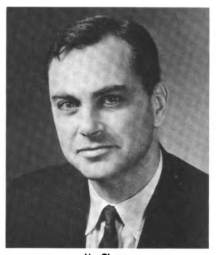

8th Legal Adviser of the Department of State
- In office February 6, 1961 – June 27, 1964
- Preceded by: Eric H. Hager
- Succeeded by: Leonard C. Meeker

Personal details
- Born: Abram Joseph Chayes; July 18, 1922 Chicago, Illinois, U.S.
- Died: April 16, 2000 (aged 77) Boston, Massachusetts, U.S.
- Spouse: Toni (nee Handler)
- Children: 5, including Sarah
- Parent(s): Edward Chayes; Kitty Chayes
- Education: Harvard College

Abram Chayes (July 18, 1922 – April 16, 2000) was an American scholar of international law closely associated with the administration of John F. Kennedy. He is best known for his "legal process" approach to international law, which attempted to provide a new, less formalistic way of understanding international law and how it might further develop. By focusing on how international legal rules are actually used by foreign policy decision-makers, Chayes sought to study international law, not within a vacuum of legal rules and procedures, but in a dynamic political environment.

== Early life and education ==
Abram Chayes's full name was Abram Joseph Chayes, but he did not use his middle name. He was born in Chicago. His parents, Kitty and Edward Chayes, were both lawyers.

He graduated summa cum laude from Harvard College in 1943 and served in the U.S. Army from 1943 to 1945 as a field artillery officer in France, the Netherlands, Germany, and Japan, leaving the service with the rank of captain. He received the Bronze Star and Purple Heart.

Chayes graduated first in his class from Harvard Law School in 1949, where he served as president of the Harvard Law Review.

== Legal, academic, and governmental career ==
After law school, Chayes was a legal advisor to Governor Chester Bowles of Connecticut from 1949 to 1951, and then served in Washington, D.C., as Associate General Counsel of the President's Materials Policy Commission in 1951. He clerked for Justice Felix Frankfurter of the United States Supreme Court from 1951 to 1952, and practiced law privately with Covington & Burling in Washington, D.C., from 1952 to 1955.

In 1955 he joined the faculty at Harvard Law School as an associate professor and began teaching courses in constitutional law and international law.

In the late 1950s, Chayes was among the original members of a group of Harvard faculty members who worked on the presidential campaign of John F. Kennedy. He led the team that drafted the 1960 Democratic Convention platform and was one of Kennedy's principal issues advisers during the campaign.

On February 9, 1961, Chayes was sworn in as Legal Adviser to the State Department. Chayes played an important role in a number of major crises, including the Berlin Crisis of 1961 and the Cuban Missile Crisis of 1962. He also worked on the Partial Test Ban Treaty of 1963 banning atmospheric nuclear tests.

In 1964, Chayes worked at the law firm of Ginsburg & Feldman in Washington, D.C., before returning to Harvard Law School in 1965, where in 1976 he became the Felix Frankfurter Professor of Law. Chayes developed a new international law course at Harvard and co-authored a widely used book, International Legal Process.

He also taught civil procedure and authored a widely cited article in the Harvard Law Review on the legal remedies and the difficulty of dealing with domestic social issues legally. He became professor emeritus in 1993, but continued to teach until incapacitated by complications from pancreatic cancer.

After leaving the Kennedy administration, Chayes remained politically active. He worked on the 1968 presidential campaign of Senator Robert F. Kennedy, wrote articles on nuclear arms control, co-authored a book with Jerome Wiesner, President Kennedy's Science Adviser, on Anti-Ballistic Missiles and strategic policy, and advised Democratic members of the Senate in the debate in the early 1970s over ABM deployment (he was a strong supporter of the ABM Treaty of 1972). In 1972, Chayes advised the presidential campaign of George McGovern on foreign policy matters, and in 1976 was a foreign policy adviser to the presidential campaign of Jimmy Carter.

In the 1980s, Chayes argued on behalf of the Government of Nicaragua against the United States in the seminal International Court of Justice (ICJ) case Nicaragua v. United States. The ICJ ruled that the U.S. was guilty of "unlawful use of force" when it mined Nicaragua's harbors. Chayes also wrote articles arguing that the Reagan Administration was barred from testing and deployment of the Strategic Defense Initiative (SDI), or "Star Wars" under the 1972 ABM Treaty.

== Publications ==
Before returning to Harvard Law, Chayes received a grant from the Carnegie Corporation to publish The Cuban Missile Crisis. In this publication, Chayes illuminated the interrelations of law and foreign policy decisions that created what many call the finest hour of Kennedy's Administration. In doing so, he reinforced the notion that “law is not a set of fixed, self-defining categories of permissible and prohibited conduct” but instead is a dynamic set of normative rules that can guide foreign policy decision-makers.

In his book, Chayes focused his analysis on three major decisions: 1) the choice of the quarantine, as opposed to harsher or milder responses, 2) the decision to seek an O.A.S. authorizing resolution, and 3) the manner and method of the approach to the U.N. analysis of the situation. In doing so, he highlighted the principal ways in which international law affected the course of action adopted: first, as a constraint, then as a basis of justification or legitimation of action, and third as providing organizational structures, procedures and forums.

Because the presence of Soviet nuclear missiles in Cuba did not constitute an armed attack on the United States, warranting a more aggressive unilateral response, the Kennedy Administration imposed a naval quarantine on Cuba. This more restrictive response only blocked offensive military equipment from being imported. A classic blockade, on the other hand, restricts all imports, including food supplies, and is considered an act of war.

Although the Soviet Union initially responded to the proposed quarantine by accusing the U.S. of “piratical acts” and “unheard of breaches of international law,” Washington lawyers took comfort in NATO support and a unanimous O.A.S. action authorizing the naval quarantine. By gaining the approval of the O.A.S. and using the unique forum of the United Nations for the crystallizing and mobilizing of national government views, the U.S. gained support and neutralized opposition during the crisis. In sum, Chayes noted the importance of the U.S. government's willingness to accept the obligation of international legal justification, and therefore, public accountability, during the successful mitigation of the Cuban Missile Crisis. In doing so, the role of international law in decision-making advanced.

In 1968, Chayes, along with Thomas Ehrlich and Andreas Lowenfeld, formally introduced a new approach to the study of international law by publishing a two-volume textbook entitled: International Legal Process: Materials for an Introductory Course. The textbook focuses on three issue areas: 1) the limits of adjudication, 2) economic affairs, and 3) political problems, in order to provide a general introduction into the scope, adequacies and failures of an international legal system operating in a contemporary and complex international arena with new political actors, including a proliferation of international organizations. Each issue area contains problems that Chayes hoped would ignite classroom discussion and critical analysis, since, as he pointed out, most of these problems do not arise before courts or arbitral tribunals, but are debated by parties, under pressure from a variety of sources including NGOs and domestic lobbyists, during the policy decision-making process. Philip Heymann once said: “For Abe, problems were there to give joy to the people who tackled them.”

Most recently, in his book The New Sovereignty: Compliance with International Regulatory Agreements, Chayes and Antonia Handler Chayes, his wife and co-author, sought to understand what states, international organizations, officials, and other actors do when they implement, or try to implement, regulatory treaties. These collaborative efforts, taking place within a complex web of norms, rules, and practices, attempt to raise levels of party compliance to acceptable levels. Although treaties are sometimes equipped with sanctioning provisions, “teeth” to enforce treaty compliance, Chayes argued that these coercive economic sanctions reflect an easy but incorrect analogy to domestic legal systems, where the coercive power of the state is thought to play an influential role in enforcing national laws. He believed economic sanctions are costly, not only the state that is believed to be defying its treaty obligations, but also on the sanctioning state. Not only are the intended results of economic sanctioning slow and not conducive to altering state behavior, but the political investment required to mobilize and maintain an economic effort in a system without any recognized hierarchy of authority is dangerously high. Alternatively, Chayes noted that unilateral enforcement is not workable because an unduly burdensome obligation would fall on this “policing state,” most likely the United States.

Before proposing an alternative framework that would replace the ineffective economic sanctioning model of compliance, Chayes discussed reasons for noncompliance. He stated that the principal source of noncompliance is not willful disobedience, but instead comes from the lack of clarity, capacity, and priority. First, in an effort to formulate rules that govern future conduct for a variety of players, treaties often result in ambiguous language that does not provide determinate answers to disputed questions of interpretation. Second, states have inherent limitations on the capacity to comply. For example, although a state might have enacted implementing legislation, it will still need to create an effective regulatory enforcement system to ensure the laws are being followed. Additionally, other limitations of scientific and technical judgments, bureaucratic capability, and fiscal resources come into play. Lastly, regulatory treaties often require significant changes in economic or social systems that, by its very nature, take time and can lead to a deceptive picture of state noncompliance. Chayes cites to examples including global efforts to protect human rights by international agreements.

As against this enforcement model, Chayes proposed an alternative managerial model of compliance, relying on a problem-solving, cooperative approach instead of a coercive one. He suggests an array of activities to ensure compliance. First, Chayes highlighted the need for transparency, including the development of data on performance through self-reporting and verification to check the reliability of reported data, both through state verification systems and, as a less formal and costly alternative, in the form of external checks from other states and nongovernmental scientific interest groups. Second, Chayes proposed informal dispute settlement measures, suggesting compulsory conciliation that would result in nonbinding recommendations. This would ensure that conciliation efforts would be able to address a broad range of disputes, while maintaining principles of sovereignty by not forcing parties to accept the decisions reached. Third, deficits in technical and bureaucratic capability and financial resources can be healed through treaty provisions that expressly provide for technical assistance to those states that are incapable of compliance due to these domestic handicaps. Fourth, Chayes combined the elements of transparency, dispute settlement, and capacity building into a broader process of “jawboning” – the effort to persuade the violator to change its ways. This can be accomplished through discourse among the parties, the treaty organization, and the international community. Chayes argued that in an international system that is increasingly interdependent, states no longer have the freedom to act independently, but instead must submit to the pressures of international regulation. He thereby cites Robert D. Putnam “The sanction for violating [the norms and expectations generated by this network] is not penal, but exclusion from the network of solidarity and cooperation.” Throughout the book, Chayes stressed the importance of the international legal process in creating and sustaining regulatory treaties, noting how the need for improving compliance can be accomplished by cooperative problem-solving by international society.

== Personal life ==
Abram Chayes married Antonia (Toni) Handler on December 24, 1947; they had five children, including journalist Sarah Chayes as well as Eve, Gayle, Lincoln, and Angelica Chayes. Antonia Handler Chayes served as Undersecretary of the Air Force from 1977–1981 during the Carter Administration, and as of 2019 was Professor of Practice of International Politics and Law at The Fletcher School, Tufts University.

== Death and legacy ==
Chayes died on April 16, 2000, at Brigham and Women's Hospital in Boston at the age of 77 of pancreatic cancer.

In 1996 he received the Peace Advocacy Award, with his wife, Antonia Handler Chayes, from the Massachusetts chapter of the Lawyers Alliance for World Security. In 1999-2000, Professor Chayes led a team of lawyers suing Slobodan Milošević in the U.S. Courts for genocide in Kosovo, and helped investigate corruption in Bosnia. He continued to work on international environmental law, teach, and serve on the Harvard interdisciplinary group on climate change. In 1999 he received the Harvard Law School Association Award (HLSA) recognizing his service as an "inspirational teacher and distinguished scholar, advocate for the rights of sovereign nations and the protection of the global environment, [and] beloved mentor to generations of Harvard Law students." The Law School celebrated his career with two days of panels and events concerning issues in international law on April 23–24, 1999.

Chayes was popular with his students. One of his traditions as a teacher was to read aloud in his raspy voice the opening pages of Bleak House by Charles Dickens at the beginning of the last class of the semester in his first-year course on Civil Procedure.

== Selected writings ==
- The Cuban Missile Crisis: International Crisis and the Role of Law (Oxford University Press 1974; second edition, 1987).
- The International Legal Process (Little, Brown, 1968, 1969) (with T. Ehrlich and A. Lowenfeld).
- The New Sovereignty: Compliance with International Regulatory Agreements (Harvard University Press, 1996 and 1998) (with Antonia Handler Chayes).

== See also ==
- List of law clerks for the second seat of the Supreme Court of the United States

Legal offices
Preceded by Eric H. Hager	Legal Adviser of the Department of State; February 6, 1961 – June 27, 1964	Succeeded by Leonard C. Meeker
