= Jonas Lindh =

Swedish footballer

Personal information
- Full name: Jonas Lindh
- Date of birth: 24 June 1982 (age 44)
- Place of birth: Sweden
- Height: 1.83 m (6 ft 0 in)
- Position: Midfielder

Youth career
- BK Fram

Senior career*
| Years | Team | Apps | (Gls) |
| 2004–2006 | Landskrona BoIS | 29 | (2) |
| 2007–2013 | Ängelholms FF | 109 | (9) |
- * Club domestic league appearances and goals as of 1 August 2015

Jonas Lindh (born 24 June 1982) is a Swedish former footballer who played as a midfielder.
