= Jacques Dominati =

French journalist and politician

Mayor of the 3rd arrondissement of Paris
- In office 1983–1995
- Succeeded by: Pierre Aidenbaum

First Deputy Mayor of Paris
- In office 1995–2001
- Mayor: Jean Tiberi
- Preceded by: Jean Tiberi
- Succeeded by: Anne Hidalgo

Member of the National Assembly for Paris
- In office 1982–1993
- Preceded by: Pierre Dabezies
- Succeeded by: Laurent Dominati

Personal details
- Born: 11 March 1927 Ajaccio, France
- Died: 8 September 2016 (aged 89) France
- Party: UDF
- Children: Philippe Dominati; Laurent Dominati; Isabelle Miller
- Occupation: Journalist

Jacques Dominati (11 March 1927 – 8 September 2016) was a French journalist and politician. Born in Corsica, he was a member of the French Resistance during World War II. He started his career as a journalist, and he was expelled from Charles de Gaulle's Rally of the French People over his support for French Algeria. He served as a member of the National Assembly from 1967 to 1978, and from 1982 to 1993, representing Paris. He served as the mayor of the 3rd arrondissement of Paris from 1983 to 1995. He served as a member of the French Senate from 1995 to 2004, representing Paris.

== Early life ==
Jacques Dominati was born on 11 March 1927 in Ajaccio, Corsica, France. He became an orphan at the age of two, when his father died. During World War II, he served in the French Resistance in Corsica. After the war, he moved to Grenoble and later to Paris.

== Career ==
Dominati was a journalist for Le Parisien libéré, which later became Le Parisien.

Dominati joined the Rally of the French People. He served as Jacques Soustelle's parliamentary assistant. He was elected to the Council of Paris in 1959. He was expelled from the Rally of the French People over his support for French Algeria.

Dominati joined the Independent Republicans, and he served as a member of the National Assembly from 1967 to 1978, representing Paris. His parliamentary assistant was Jean-Marie Le Chevallier. In 1977, Dominati was appointed as deputy minister for French repatriates and civil servants under Prime Minister Raymond Barre. He then joined the Union for French Democracy, and he served as a member of the National Assembly from 1982 to 1993, once again representing Paris. Meanwhile, he served as the mayor of the 3rd arrondissement of Paris from 1983 to 1995. He also served in the French Senate from 24 September 1995 to 30 September 2004.

== Personal life and death ==
Dominati had two sons, Laurent Dominati and Philippe Dominati, both of whom served in the National Assembly. He was a personal friend of Jean-Marie Le Pen's, who became one of his sons's godfather. He also had a daughter, Isabelle Miller, who is an author.

Dominati retired in Corsica. He died on 8 September 2016.
