= Geneviève Levy =

French politician (born 1948)

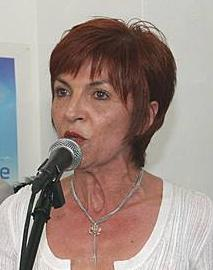
Geneviève Levy

Geneviève Levy (born 24 February 1948 in Marseille) is a French politician who was a member of the National Assembly of France as a member of the Republicans. She represented the 1st constituency of the Var department from 2002 until 2022.
