= Richard Lioger =

French politician

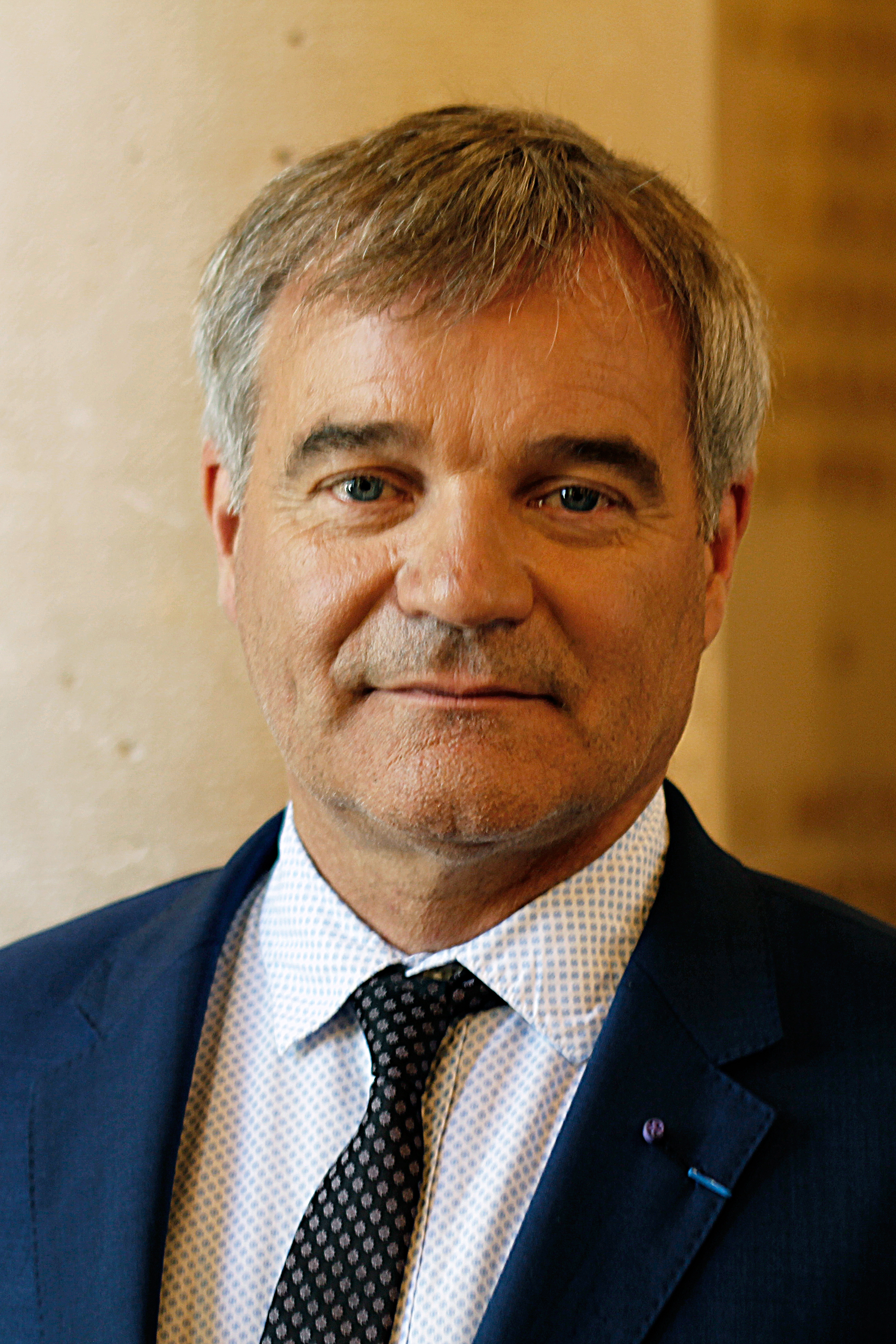
Richard Lioger in July 2017

Richard Lioger is a French politician representing La République En Marche! He was elected to the French National Assembly on 18 June 2017, representing Moselle's 3rd constituency. He lost his seat in the first round of the 2022 French legislative election.

== See also ==
- 2017 French legislative election
- List of MPs who lost their seat in the 2022 French legislative election
