= Thomas Lindh =

Swedish economist (1956–2013)

Thomas Lindh (1952–2013) was a Swedish economist. He received his doctorate in economics in 1991 at Uppsala University, where he remained as a researcher before the beginning of the 2000s, becoming research director at the Institute for Future Studies. The last few years, Lindh was also a professor at Linnaeus University.

== Contributions ==
As a scientist, Lindh left several important scientific contributions. His most famous study, written with Henry Ohlsson, shows how people are more likely to start their own if they have better funding. But attention was also great when he and Jonas Agell and Ohlsson gave into the lively debate about the relationship between economic growth and the size of the public sector. Thomas and co-authors took in an EER article a skeptical stance towards the previous studies which found a negative growth effect of the public sector. Lindh also had a deep scientific interest in demographic economics where, together with, among others, Bo Malmberg, he studied the effects of population's changing age structure on growth and development.
