= Denis Jacquat =

French politician

Denis Jacquat (born 29 May 1944 in Thiaucourt-Regniéville, Meurthe-et-Moselle) is a member of the National Assembly of France. He represents the Moselle department, and is a member of the Union for a Popular Movement.
