= Philippe Dominati =

French politician

Member of the French Senate for Paris
- Incumbent
- Assumed office 1 October 2004

Personal details
- Born: 12 April 1954 (age 71) Paris, France
- Party: The Republicans

Philippe Dominati (born 12 April 1954) is a French politician and a member of the Senate of France. He represents Paris and is a member of The Republicans Party.
