= Modi Rosenfeld =

Israeli-American comedian

- מודי רוזנפלד
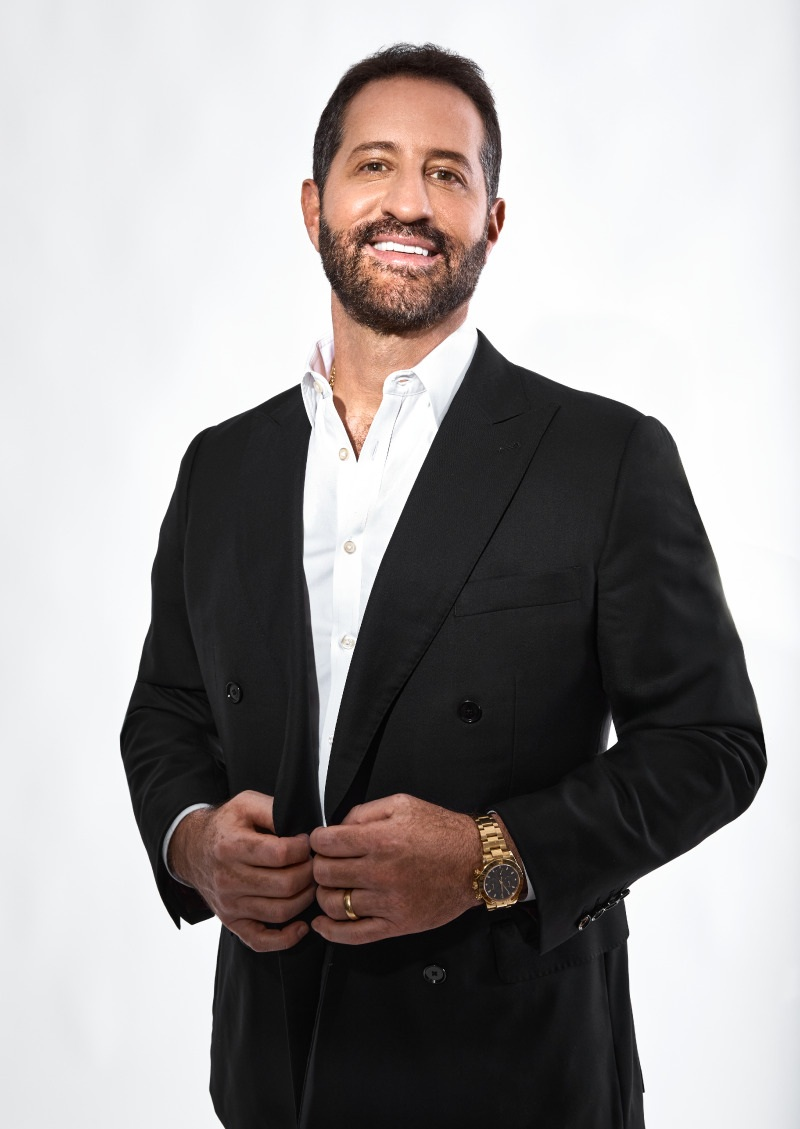
- Born: Mordechi Rosenfeld; 1970 (age 55–56); Tel Aviv, Israel
- Spouse: Leo Veiga (m. 2020)

Comedy career
- Years active: 1999–present
- Medium: Stand-up; television; film; books
- Genres: Jewish comedy; sketch comedy; American comedy; observational comedy
- Subjects: Jewish culture; Judaism; American culture; Israeli culture; everyday life; pop culture; gender differences; human behavior

Modi Rosenfeld (Hebrew: מודי רוזנפלד; born Mordechi Rosenfeld), known professionally as Modi (stylized as MODI) is an Israeli-American stand-up comedian and actor. He is known for his Jewish humor and has become a mainstay among Orthodox audiences.

== Early years ==
Rosenfeld was born in Tel Aviv and moved to Woodmere, New York, with his family when he was seven years old. His parents spoke only Hebrew at home and the family spent their summers in Israel. He graduated from George W. Hewlett High School in 1988 and Boston University in 1992, majoring in psychology and minoring in voice.

Rosenfeld studied cantorial music at Yeshiva University's Belz School of Music. He was a Wall Street international banker for Merrill Lynch before entering comedy.

== Career ==
Modi is an established headliner at comedy clubs across the United States and is a regular fixture on the comedy scene in both New York and Los Angeles. His home club is the Comedy Cellar. Modi has performed for Orthodox, Reform and other non-Orthodox audiences internationally. He performed at the launch party of the late Israeli astronaut Ilan Ramon in Houston before takeoff.

Rosenfeld is known for having a particularly large following among Orthodox audiences, performing at yeshivas, National Council of Young Israel affiliates, Hatzalah, Chabad telethons and Eshel. He has also performed for special Shabbat dinners for the Council of Fashion Designers of America.

Rosenfeld has contributed to US Weekly as a member of the fashion police. He was a semi-finalist on the fourth season of Last Comic Standing.

Rosenfeld cites Don Rickles, Jackie Mason, George Carlin, and Louis CK as his comedic inspirations.

The City of New York proclaimed June 26, 2018 "Mordechi 'Modi' Rosenfeld Day".

Rosenfeld is the co-founder and producer of the Chosen Comedy Festival, along with comedians Elon Gold and Dani Zoldan. The festival premiered in Coney Island in summer 2022.

In 2023, he was featured in the "36 to Watch" list by New York Jewish Week, which honors Jewish personalities for their contributions to the city's Jewish community. In 2024, he was inducted into Anu – Museum of the Jewish People's Hall of Fame for Jewish Humor.

He is the host of his own podcast called And Here's Modi. He has also been a guest on the podcasts Unorthodox, WTF with Marc Maron and Headliners with Nihal Arthanayake for the BBC. Rosenfeld has coined the term "Moshiach energy" to describe his performance style. In a 2023 piece published in Variety, Rosenfeld discussed being gay while performing for many orthodox Jewish communities. In his comedic routines, Rosenfeld attempts to demonstrate that it is possible to be a practicing and observant Jew as well as part of the LGBTQ community.

== Personal life ==
Modi is Jewish and is a member of a Modern Orthodox congregation in Manhattan.

Rosenfeld has described his Jewish practice in terms of regular observance, including wearing tefillin in the morning while touring and keeping a kosher home.

He is gay and legally married his partner, Leo Veiga, in 2020. Veiga was raised Catholic and is also Modi's manager.

He is dyslexic and has been diagnosed with attention deficit disorder.

== Filmography ==
Year	Film/Show	Role	Notes
1997	Friday Night	Modi	TV series; episode: "Sunset Beach - Behind the Scenes"
2002	The Sopranos	Etan	TV series; episode: "Mergers and Acquisitions"
2003	Connecting Dots	Tom	
2004	Waiting for Woody Allen	Mendel	Short film
2004	Der Kosh	Rabbi	Short film
2004	Our Italian Husband	Pasquale	
2006	Ira & Abby	Marvin the Limo Driver	
2006	Agent Emes 5: Agent Emes and the Happy Chanukah	Rocky Rabinowitz	Video
2007	Stand Up	Avi	
2007	A Perfect Holiday	Father in Line	
2008	One, Two, Many	Jermaine	
2009	CSI: NY	David Klein	TV series; episode: "Yahrzeit"
2010	Horrorween	Shlomo	
2014–2015	Deadbeat	Menachem Mendel	5 episodes
2017	Madam Secretary	Oded Dahan	TV series; episode: "The Essentials"
2019	Crashing	Himself	TV series; episode: "The Temple Gig"

=== Video games ===
Year	Game	Role	Notes
2008	Grand Theft Auto IV	Issac Roth	
2009	Grand Theft Auto: The Lost and Damned	Issac Roth	Archive footage
2009	Grand Theft Auto: The Ballad of Gay Tony	Issac Roth	

== See also ==
- Mendy Pellin
- Meir Kay
- Adina Sash
