= New York's 58th State Assembly district =

American legislative district

Assemblymember
Monique Chandler-Waterman; D–East Flatbush

New York's 58th State Assembly district is one of the 150 districts in the New York State Assembly. It has been represented by Monique Chandler-Waterman since 2022. She replaced 29-year Assemblyman N. Nick Perry, who was nominated as United States ambassador to Jamaica in 2022.

== Geography ==
District 58 is in Brooklyn. The district includes parts of East Flatbush, Canarsie, and Brownsville.

The district overlaps (partially) with New York's 8th and 9th congressional districts, the 19th, 20th and 21st districts of the New York State Senate, and the 40th, 41st, 42nd, 45th and 46th districts of the New York City Council.

== Recent election results ==
=== 2026 ===
2026 New York State Assembly election, District 58
Party	Candidate	Votes	%
Democratic	Monique Chandler-Waterman		
Working Families	Monique Chandler-Waterman		
Total	Monique Chandler-Waterman (incumbent)		
Write-in			
Total votes			100.0

=== 2024 ===
2024 New York State Assembly election, District 58
Party	Candidate	Votes	%
Democratic	Monique Chandler-Waterman (incumbent)	35,744	99.8
Write-in		71	0.2
Total votes		35,815	100.0
Democratic hold			

=== 2022 ===
2022 New York State Assembly election, District 58
Primary election
Party	Candidate	Votes	%
Democratic	Monique Chandler-Waterman (incumbent)	5,410	65.3
Democratic	Hercules Reid	2,866	34.6
Write-in		9	0.1
Total votes		8,285	100.0
General election
Democratic	Monique Chandler-Waterman	21,807	
Working Families	Monique Chandler-Waterman	758	
Total	Monique Chandler-Waterman (incumbent)	22,565	94.9
Republican	Monique Allen-Davy	1,033	
Conservative	Monique Allen-Davy	145	
Total	Monique Allen-Davy	1,178	5.0
Write-in		19	0.1
Total votes		23,762	100.0
Democratic hold			

=== 2022 special ===
2022 New York State Assembly special election, District 58
Party	Candidate	Votes	%
Democratic	Monique Chandler-Waterman	1,867	
Working Families	Monique Chandler-Waterman	118	
Total	Monique Chandler-Waterman	1,985	79.8
Education is Key	Hercules Reid	440	17.7
Republican	Monique Allen-Davy	44	
Conservative	Monique Allen-Davy	16	
Total	Monique Allen-Davy	60	2.4
Write-in		2	0.1
Total votes		2,487	100.0
Democratic hold			

=== 2020 ===
2020 New York State Assembly election, District 58
Party	Candidate	Votes	%
Democratic	N. Nick Perry	41,635	
Working Families	N. Nick Perry	2,102	
Total	N. Nick Perry (incumbent)	43,737	99.9
Write-in		60	0.1
Total votes		43,797	100.0
Democratic hold			

=== 2018 ===
2018 New York State Assembly election, District 58
Party	Candidate	Votes	%
Democratic	N. Nick Perry	32,839	
Working Families	N. Nick Perry	652	
Total	N. Nick Perry (incumbent)	33,491	99.9
Write-in		60	0.1
Total votes		33,526	100.0
Democratic hold			

=== 2016 ===
2016 New York State Assembly election, District 58
Party	Candidate	Votes	%
Democratic	N. Nick Perry	39,795	
Working Families	N. Nick Perry	696	
Women's Equality	N. Nick Perry	221	
Total	N. Nick Perry (incumbent)	40,712	99.9
Write-in		48	0.1
Total votes		40,760	100.0
Democratic hold			

=== 2014 ===
2014 New York State Assembly election, District 58
Party	Candidate	Votes	%
Democratic	N. Nick Perry (incumbent)	15,787	99.8
Write-in		28	0.2
Total votes		15,815	100.0
Democratic hold			

=== 2012 ===
2012 New York State Assembly election, District 58
Primary election
Party	Candidate	Votes	%
Democratic	N. Nick Perry (incumbent)	4,556	75.2
Democratic	Terry Hinds	1,484	24.5
Write-in		18	0.3
Total votes		6,058	100.0
General election
Democratic	N. Nick Perry	38,076	
Working Families	N. Nick Perry	419	
Total	N. Nick Perry (incumbent)	38,495	99.9
Write-in		27	0.1
Total votes		38,522	100.0
Democratic hold			

=== 2010 ===
2010 New York State Assembly election, District 58
Party	Candidate	Votes	%
Democratic	N. Nick Perry	17,518	
Working Families	N. Nick Perry	1,027	
Total	N. Nick Perry (incumbent)	18,545	99.9
Write-in		8	0.1
Total votes		18,553	100.0
Democratic hold			

=== 2008 ===
2008 New York State Assembly election, District 58
Party	Candidate	Votes	%
Democratic	N. Nick Perry	29,628	
Working Families	N. Nick Perry	441	
Total	N. Nick Perry (incumbent)	30,069	100.0
Write-in		0	0.0
Total votes		30,069	100.0
Democratic hold			

=== 2006 ===
2006 New York State Assembly election, District 58
Party	Candidate	Votes	%
Democratic	N. Nick Perry	13,885	
Working Families	N. Nick Perry	806	
Total	N. Nick Perry (incumbent)	14,691	98.6
Conservative	Robert Gaffney	215	1.4
Write-in		1	0.0
Total votes		14,907	100.0
Democratic hold			

=== 2004 ===
2004 New York State Assembly election, District 58
Party	Candidate	Votes	%
Democratic	N. Nick Perry	25,830	
Working Families	N. Nick Perry	629	
Total	N. Nick Perry (incumbent)	26,459	95.7
Republican	Dora Robertson	1,027	
Conservative	Dora Robertson	149	
Total	Dora Robertson	1,176	4.3
Write-in		0	0.0
Total votes		27,635	100.0
Democratic hold			

=== 2002 ===
2002 New York State Assembly election, District 58
Party	Candidate	Votes	%
Democratic	N. Nick Perry	13,955	
Working Families	N. Nick Perry	775	
Total	N. Nick Perry (incumbent)	14,730	99.0
Conservative	Robert Gaffney	142	1.0
Write-in		2	0.0
Total votes		14,874	100.0
Democratic hold			

=== 2000 ===
2000 New York State Assembly election, District 58
Party	Candidate	Votes	%
Democratic	N. Nick Perry	19,320	
Working Families	N. Nick Perry	614	
Liberal	N. Nick Perry	258	
Total	N. Nick Perry (incumbent)	20,192	99.3
Conservative	Joseph Caesar	132	0.6
Write-in		1	0.0
Total votes		20,325	100.0
Democratic hold			

=== Federal results in Assembly District 58 ===
Year	Office	Results
2024	President	Harris 92.1 - 7.2%
2024	Senate	Gillibrand 93.4 - 6.1%
2022	Senate	Schumer 94.8 - 4.9%
2020	President	Biden 95.3 - 4.2%
2018	Senate	Gillibrand 98.0 - 2.0%
2016	President	Clinton 95.9 - 2.7%
2016	Senate	Schumer 96.7 - 2.2%
2012	President	Obama 98.4 - 1.5%
2012	Senate	Gillibrand 98.6 - 1.3%
