= Monique Chandler-Waterman =

American politician

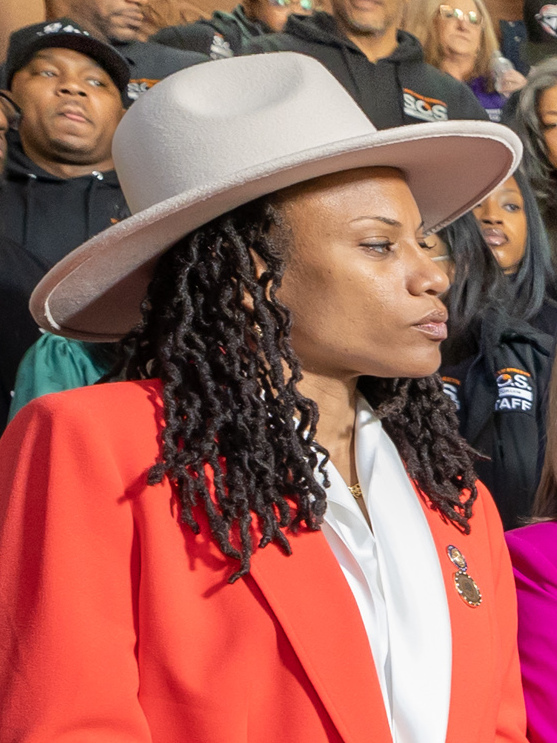

Member of the New York State Assembly from the 58th district
- Incumbent
- Assumed office May 31, 2022
- Preceded by: N. Nick Perry

Personal details
- Born: Monique Chandler; January 14, 1981 (age 45) Brooklyn, New York, U.S.
- Party: Democratic
- Spouse: Eric Waterman (m. 2001)
- Children: 4
- Education: Berkeley College (BBA); Metropolitan College of New York (MBA)
- Website: State Assembly website

Monique Chandler-Waterman (born January 14, 1981) is an American community organizer and politician serving as a member of the New York State Assembly for the 58th district since May 2022. A member of the Democratic Party, Chandler-Waterman won her seat in a special election to fill the seat vacated when N. Nick Perry was appointed U.S. ambassador to Jamaica.

== Early life and education ==
Chandler-Waterman was born in New York City, the daughter of immigrants from Jamaica and Barbados. She attended PS 135 and Boys and Girls High School, and later received bachelor's and master's degrees in business administration from Berkeley College and Metropolitan College of New York, respectively.

== Political career ==
Chandler-Waterman worked as a community outreach director for Jumaane Williams. She also founded youth-focused nonprofit East Flatbush Village in 2008. During the COVID-19 pandemic, she worked as director of ground support at New York City’s Test and Trace Corps.

=== 2019 city council campaign ===
Following New York City Councilmember Jumaane Williams' resignation to take office as the New York City Public Advocate, Chandler-Waterman ran in the special general election to fill his term in the 45th district on May 14, 2019. Williams endorsed her, while Eric Adams and Frank Seddio backed Farah Louis. Chandler-Waterman placed second, behind Louis, with 29.3% of the vote.

She also ran in the regular Democratic primary election on June 25, again placing second behind Louis with 43% of the vote.

=== New York State Assembly ===
Following State Assemblymember N. Nick Perry's resignation to take office as the U.S. Ambassador to Jamaica, Chandler-Waterman was nominated by the Brooklyn Democratic Party County Committee as the party's nominee in a special election to fill his term in the 58th district on May 24, 2022. She won the election with 79.8% of the vote, defeating Hercules Reid, whom New York City Mayor Eric Adams endorsed, on the Education is Key ballot line and Monique Allen-Davy on the Republican and Conservative Party lines.

She won the primary election to a full term on June 28, again defeating Reid with 65.3% of the vote.

In March 2026, Chandler-Waterman authored legislation mandating that MTA subway trains have a two-person crew. Critics described two-person crews as costly and unnecessary, as most of the world’s major train lines have either one-person crews or have moved to full automation.

== Personal life ==
She is married to Eric Waterman, with whom she has four children. Waterman previously worked as a football coach at Samuel J. Tilden High School; he was suspended without pay from the role for failing to report a sexual assault allegation in October 2019.

== Electoral history ==
=== 2019 ===
2019 New York City Council election, District 45
Primary election
Party	Candidate	Votes	%
Democratic	Farah Louis (incumbent)	4,690	49.9
Democratic	Monique Chandler-Waterman	4,039	43.0
Democratic	L. Rickie Tulloch	175	1.9
Democratic	Xamayla Rose	163	1.7
Democratic	Jovia Radix	132	1.4
Democratic	Adina Sash	95	1.0
Democratic	Victor Jordan	53	0.6
Democratic	Anthony Alexis	46	0.5
Write-in		10	0.1
Total votes		9,403	100

2019 New York City Council special election, District 45
Party	Candidate	Votes	%
A Unified 45	Farah Louis	3,949	40.6
A Vital Voice	Monique Chandler-Waterman	2,848	29.3
Justice for All	Jovia Radix	871	9.0
Community First	Adina Sash	696	7.2
Peoples Movement	L. Rickie Tulloch	638	6.6
Rose for Progress	Xamayla Rose	545	5.6
Unite to Uplift	Anthony Alexis	119	1.2
Last Chance	Victor Jordan	46	0.5
Write-in		16	0.2
Total votes		9,728	100
