= 1993 New York City Public Advocate election =

- November 2, 1993
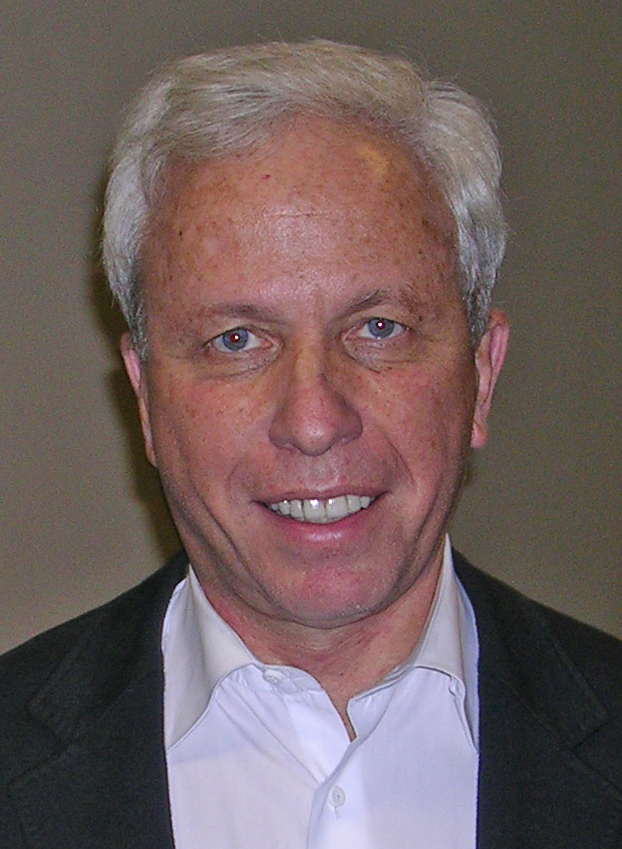

Nominee	Mark Green	Susan Alter
Party	Democratic	Republican
Alliance		Liberal
Popular vote	949,000	574,453
Percentage	60.3%	36.5%
- Green: 40–50% 50–60% 60–70% 70–80% 80–90% >90% Alter: 40–50% 50–60% 60–70% 70–80%
Public Advocate before election
Andrew Stein (as Council President)
Democratic
Elected Public Advocate
Mark Green
Democratic

An election was held on November 2, 1993 to elect the New York City Public Advocate, an office created for this election following reforms to the city charter which held some of the devolved powers of the defunct office of New York City Council President following the disestablishment of the New York City Board of Estimate in the Supreme Court case Board of Estimate of City of New York v. Morris.

Democratic incumbent City Council President Andrew Stein initially did not seek re-election to the office, opting instead to challenge incumbent mayor David Dinkins in the Democratic primary. However, he dropped out of the mayoral race and ran for Public Advocate before withdrawing from that race, too. Mark Green won the Democratic primary over a large field led by Harlem state senator David A. Paterson.

== Democratic primary ==
=== Candidates ===
- Susan Alter, City Councilwoman from Brooklyn (also running as Republican and Liberal)
- Mark Green, Consumer Affairs Commissioner of New York City and candidate for U.S. Senate in 1986
- Donald Halperin, State Senator from Brooklyn
- David A. Paterson, State Senator from Harlem
- Roberto Ramirez, State Assemblyman from the Bronx
- Ronald W. Reale, president of the Transit Police Benevolent Association

==== Withdrew ====
- Andrew Stein, incumbent City Council President since 1986

=== Campaign ===
Although the new office of Public Advocate was less powerful than the City Council presidency which it replaced, it drew an uncommonly large number of candidates. Many analysts predicted that despite the reduced powers under the revised charter, the office would still provide its holder citywide name recognition and a springboard for higher office.

While most candidates in the race sought to address core racial or ethnic constitutencies, Green campaigned vigorously in every neighborhood and among every ethnic group. His chief opponent was David A. Paterson of Harlem, who expected to capitalize on black voter turnout with David Dinkins on the ballot and force the race into a run-off.

Dinkins declined to endorse any candidate in the primary, viewing both Green and Paterson as allies and seeking to avoid alienating the large Hispanic constituency which supported Ramirez. Susan Alter, who was also running on the Republican and Liberal ticket of Rudolph Giuliani, actively campaigned against Dinkins.

=== Results ===
Results by State Assembly district Green: 30%–40%; 40%–50%; 50%–60%; 60%–70%; 70%–80%; Paterson: 30%–40%; 40%–50%; 60%–70%; Alter: 30%–40%; 40%–50%; 50%–60%; Ramirez: 30%–40%; 40%–50%; 50%–60%; Halperin: 30%–40%

By receiving over 40 percent of the vote, Green was able to win the nomination outright and avoid a run-off election against Paterson. The strength of his victory came as a surprise to political observers, who expected a run-off between Green and Paterson.

1993 Democratic Public Advocate primary (unofficial)
Party	Candidate	Votes	%
Democratic	Mark Green	226,916	44.87%
Democratic	David A. Paterson	94,755	18.74%
Democratic	Susan Alter	70,504	13.94%
Democratic	Roberto Ramirez	61,959	12.25%
Democratic	Donald Halperin	39,960	7.90%
Democratic	Ronald W. Reale	11,662	2.31%
Total votes		505,756	100.00%

== General election ==
=== Candidates ===
- Susan Alter, City Councilwoman from Brooklyn (Republican and Liberal)
- Al Duncan (Socialist Workers)
- Bob Falk (Libertarian)
- Marjorie Barrett Garvey (Right to Life)
- Mark Green, Consumer Affairs Commissioner of New York City and candidate for U.S. Senate in 1986 (Democratic)
- Ronald W. Reale, president of the Transit Police Benevolent Association (Conservative)

=== Results ===
1993 New York City Public Advocate election
Party	Candidate	Votes	%
Democratic	Mark Green	949,000	60.33%
Republican	Susan Alter	574,453	36.52%
Conservative	Ronald W. Reale	20,890	1.33%
Right to Life	Majorie Barrett Garvey	17,498	1.11%
Socialist Workers	Al Duncan	5,778	0.37%
Libertarian	Bob Falk	5,410	0.34%
Total votes		1,573,029	100.00%
