= Great American =

Great American may refer to:

== Buildings and structures ==
- Great American Ball Park, a Major League Baseball park in Cincinnati, Ohio named for Great American Insurance Group
- Great American Music Hall, a concert hall in San Francisco, California
- Great American Tower, a high-rise office building in Phoenix, Arizona, U.S.
- Great American Tower at Queen City Square, a skyscraper in Cincinnati, Ohio, U.S.

== Business ==
- Great American Bank, western U.S. bank headquartered in San Diego
- Great American Insurance Company, the insurance division of American Financial Group
- The Great American Bagel Bakery, a restaurant franchise
- Great American Broadcasting, a former name of defunct media conglomerate Taft Broadcasting
- Great American Cookies, an American chain of franchised gourmet cookie stores

== Nature ==
- Great American Desert, a term used in the 19th century to describe the western part of the Great Plains east of the Rocky Mountains in North America, and now sometimes used to describe the arid region of the Southwest, which includes parts of northern Mexico and the four deserts of North America
- Great American Insurance Group and Great American Financial Resources, divisions of American Financial Group
- Great American Interchange, a paleozoogeographic event in which land and freshwater fauna migrated from North America via Central America to South America and vice versa

== Sports ==
- Great American Conference, an American college athletic conference
- Great American Mountain Rally, an automotive rally once held in November in New England, U.S.
- Great American Stakes, a defunct American Thoroughbred horse race

== Other uses ==
- Great American Brass Band Festival, an annual music festival held in Danville, Kentucky, U.S.
- Great American Train Show, a now-defunct traveling U.S. model train show

== See also ==
- Great America (disambiguation)
- Great Americans (disambiguation)
