= Ayelet =

Ayelet may refer to:

== People ==
- Ayelet Gundar-Goshen, Israeli author
- Ayelet the Kosher Komic, Orthodox Jewish female stand-up comedian
- Ayelet Menahemi, Israeli film director, producer, writer, editor, and actor
- Ayelet Ohayon (born 1974), Israeli European champion foil fencer
- Ayelet Shachar (born 1966), legal scholar
- Ayelet Shaked, Israeli politician
- Ayelet Waldman, Israeli-American novelist and essayist
- Ayelet Zurer, Israeli actress

== Places ==
- Ayelet HaShahar, kibbutz in northern Israel
