= Brenda Johnson =

Brenda Johnson may refer to:

- Brenda LaGrange Johnson (born 1939), an American businesswoman and diplomat
- Brenda Leigh Johnson, a fictional character in the TV series The Closer
