= Great America =

Great America may refer to:

== Amusement parks ==
- California's Great America, Santa Clara, California
- Six Flags Great America, Gurnee, Illinois
- Marriott's Great America (Maryland–Virginia), a proposed park from the 1970s

== Transportation ==
- Santa Clara–Great America station, a train station in Santa Clara, California
- Great America station (VTA), a light rail station in Santa Clara, California

== Other uses ==
- Great America (painting), 1994, by Kerry James Marshall

== See also ==
- Great American (disambiguation)
