= Meir Kay =

American internet personality

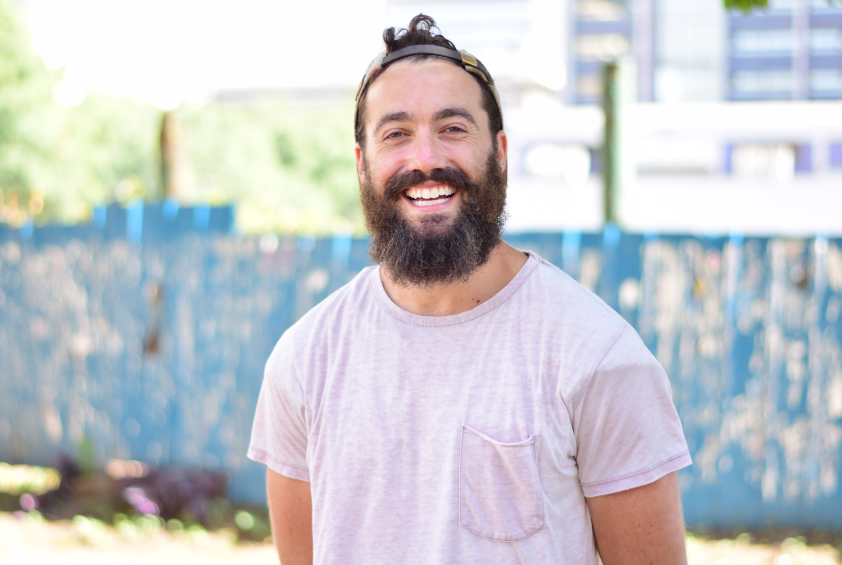
- Kay in 2017
- Born: Meir Kalmanson; Brooklyn, Ney York City, U.S.

YouTube information
- Channel: Meir Kay
- Years active: 2008–present
- Genre: Spiritual
- Website: meirkay.com

Meir Kalmanson, known by his stage name Meir Kay, is an American Internet personality best known for his inspirational vlogs and interviews on YouTube, which have amassed over 350 million views and his social media presence with upwards of one million followers. He is known for his interviews with inspirational people and vlogs, where he posts updates about obscure places. He makes YouTube videos showcasing random acts of kindness.

== Life and career ==
Born in Brooklyn, New York, Kay was raised in New Haven, Connecticut. He is affiliated with the Chabad movement of Judaism. He attended rabbinical school in Singapore, and afterwards felt called to spread kindness and joy in unexpected ways, by video. He began this career in March 2010 and uploaded his first YouTube video titled "Bubby Luba's Song”, inspired by his grandmother. He was encouraged by friends to continue uploading videos to the site.

Kay posts videos, usually including himself in the videos to showcase kindness, joy, acceptance, empathy, sharing, diversity, inclusion and celebration of life. He enjoys filming unexpected social experiments. His style of comedy leans towards storytelling, satire as well as re-examining social and societal norms. His video "High Five New York" was posted on September 14, 2014, and used to be the most popular video by Kay. He was seen giving a high five to the people who stuck out their hands to hail a taxi in New York City. Meir has said that his goal is to spread joy, positivity and inspiration for others to pass on kindness, through the videos that he creates.

== See also ==
- Adina Sash
- Ayelet the Kosher Komic
- Mendy Pellin
