= Great America (painting) =

1994 painting by Kerry James Marshall

- Artist: Kerry James Marshall
- Year: 1994
- Medium: Acrylic on canvas
- Movement: Contemporary art
- Dimensions: 261.62 cm × 289.56 cm (103.00 in × 114.00 in)
- Location: The National Gallery of Art, Washington, D.C.
- Accession: 2011.20.1
- Website: www.nga.gov/collection/art-object-page.154931.html

Great America is a 1994 acrylic-and-collage-on-canvas painting by American contemporary artist and professor Kerry James Marshall.

== Description ==
From Slow Painting:

"Three young women and a man are crammed in a canoe-like boat that looks like the ones we know from amusement parks. In combination with the texts 'wow' in the word balloon and 'Great America' on a ribbon, this brightly colored painting immediately evokes associations with a commercial billboard—an advertisement to attract visitors...In the upper right corner we can see a fifth figure that seems to be drowning. And what about the dark tunnel the boat appears to be entering? The suggestion of a dramatic, insecure future quite conflicts with an understanding of the image as being related to promoting spooky entertainment."

== Interpretation ==
The National Gallery of Art, where Great America was exhibited in 2013, has described its meaning as:

"This painting reimagines a boat ride into a haunted tunnel at an amusement park as the Middle Passage—the forced journey of slaves from Africa to the Americas. What might in other hands be a work of heavy irony becomes instead a delicate interweaving of the histories of painting and race. The canvas, which is stretched directly onto the wall, creates a screen or backdrop onto which viewers project their own associations triggered by the powerful imagery."

Writing about the painting in The Wall Street Journal, Kelly Crow expands upon the idea of the canvas as an amusement park scene, with a group of black people aboard the "Tunnel of Love" boat ride. Crow explains:

"At first glance, the work's brightly colored palette makes everything seem merry, but Mr. Marshall fills his tunnel with ghostly, hooded shapes that evoke the Ku Klux Klan. The passengers are also crammed into the boat in a way that's reminiscent of the Middle Passage, the centurieslong slave trade that involved shipping kidnapped Africans to the New World."

The Washington Post said of the painting:

"On closer inspection, in fact, the figures are not smiling. They don’t seem to be having the least bit of fun. Nor is this body of water upon which they sail some fun-house lagoon; there are suggestions of turbulence and depth, and mountains in the distance. This is an ocean, it dawns on us, the Atlantic Ocean. And if the people in the boat are contemporary Americans at leisure, they are also their ancestors embarked on the middle passage, the tragic voyage that brought them here from Africa in shackles.

Marhsall himself has said Great American is about, "both the transatlantic slave trade and what it means for present-day black people to be Americans."

== History ==
The National Gallery of Art acquired the painting in 2011. Great America was the centerpiece of an exhibit at the National Gallery of Art entitled "In the Tower: Kerry James Marshall", which was on view from June to December 2013.

At least one study Marshall produced ahead of painting the final canvas for Great America was lost when a fire destroyed the Kent, Washington, D.C. home of art collector Peggy Cooper Cafritz.

== Reception and influence ==
Will Gompertz, writing for BBC News, drew comparisons between Great America and Donald Glover's "This Is America" music video, saying of the video, "Its subject of race, representation, opportunity and acts of extreme violence against African Americans is shared with the work of several other leading contemporary black American artists...Kerry James Marshall's 1994 painting, Great America, for instance."

Chicago magazine described the canvas as, "a tart, haunting rendering of the transatlantic slave trade as a ghastly carnival ride." Complex named Great America one of the greatest American paintings.

== See also ==
- African-American art
- Visual art of the United States
