= Farah Louis =

American politician (born 1983)

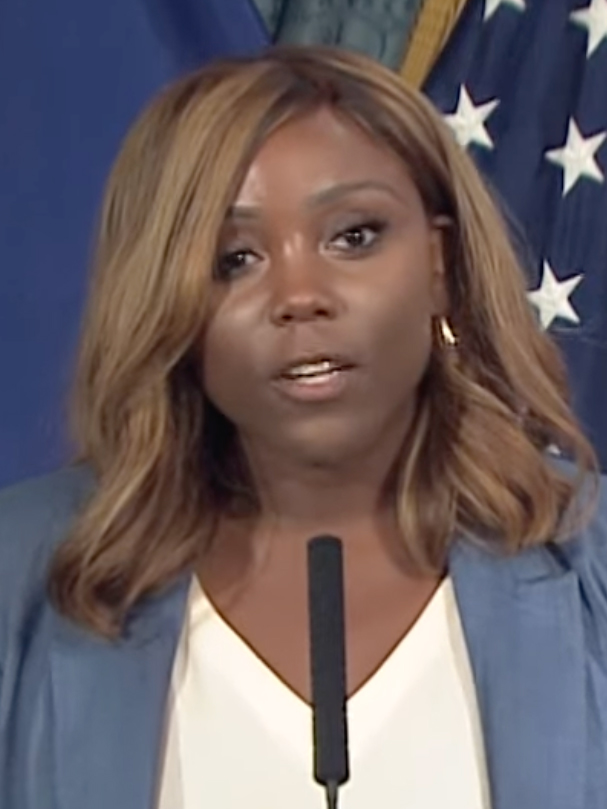

Member of the New York City Council from the 45th district
- Incumbent
- Assumed office June 13, 2019
- Preceded by: Jumaane Williams

Personal details
- Born: September 25, 1983 (age 43) New York City, New York, U.S.
- Party: Democratic
- Spouse: Anthony Drayton (m. 2015)
- Education: Long Island University, Brooklyn (BA); New York University (MPA)
- Website: Official website

Farah Naomi Louis (born September 25, 1983) is an American politician. She is a member of the Democratic Party and is a member of the New York City Council for the 45th district, which includes the Brooklyn neighborhoods of East Flatbush, Flatbush, Flatlands, Marine Park, and Midwood.

== Early life and education ==
Both of Louis's parents immigrated from Haiti. Her mother worked in healthcare, while her father was a law enforcement professional and later a yellow cab driver.

Louis attended Midwood High School, then received a BA in English from LIU Brooklyn and an MPA from New York University's Robert F. Wagner Graduate School of Public Service.

== Career ==
Louis worked as a mental healthcare provider for eight years, then worked in Jumaane Williams' New York City Council office, first as director of community outreach, then as deputy chief of staff. She worked in Williams' office for six years and was still in that role when he was elected New York City Public Advocate, creating the vacancy Louis would be then elected to. Williams did not endorse Louis, but another challenger for the District 45 seat who also worked in his Council office, Monique Chandler-Waterman.

Louis won her Council seat in a special election on May 14, 2019, in a low-turnout election. She finished with 3,861 votes, a plurality of 41.81%, ahead of second-place Chandler-Waterman who finished with 2,790 votes cast (30.21%). She officially took office after being sworn in on June 13, 2019. As a result of New York laws, another special election was held to determine if she will serve the remainder of Williams' four-year term ending December 31, 2021. She won the June 25, 2019, Democratic primary 51.69% to Chandler-Waterman's 41.36%. On November 5, 2019, Louis won the general election gaining 93.1% to Anthony Beckford's 4.7%. On June 22, 2021, Louis won the Democratic Primary as the incumbent with 75.4% of the vote. Later in 2021 she ran unopposed in the general election on November 2 to win re-election.

== Legal Issues ==
In March 2026, federal investigators began investigating whether Louis accepted bribes in connection with the appropriation of funds directed towards a migrant shelter provider.

== Electoral history ==
=== 2025 ===
2025 New York City Council election, District 45
Party	Candidate	Votes	%
Democratic	Farah Louis (incumbent)	33,182	84.3
Republican	Joshua Elijah Diaz	3,720	9.4
Conservative	Joshua Elijah Diaz	796	2.0
Total	Joshua Elijah Diaz	4,516	11.5
Safe&Affordable	Hatem El-Gamasy	1,549	3.9
Write-in		120	0.3
Total votes		39,367	100.0
Democratic hold			

=== 2023 ===
2023 New York City Council election, District 45
Party	Candidate	Votes	%
Democratic	Farah Louis (incumbent)	8,750	96.7
Write-in		298	3.3
Total votes		9,048	100.0
Democratic hold			

=== 2021 ===
2021 New York City Council Democratic primary, District 45
Party	Candidate	Votes	%
Democratic	Farah Louis (incumbent)	14,544	75.4
Democratic	Anthony Beckford	3,819	19.8
Democratic	Cyril F. Joseph	818	4.2
Write-in		116	0.6
Total votes		19,297	100.0

2021 New York City Council election, District 45
Party	Candidate	Votes	%
Democratic	Farah Louis (incumbent)	19,206	93.5
Our Flatbush	Louis Cespedes	1,158	5.6
Write-in		167	0.8
Total votes		20,531	100.0
Democratic hold			

=== 2019 ===
2019 New York City's 45th City Council district special election
Party	Candidate	Votes	%
A Unified 45	Farah Louis	3,949	40.6
A Vital Voice	Monique Chandler-Waterman	2,848	29.3
Justice For All	Jovia A. Radix	871	9.0
Community First	Adina Sash	696	7.2
Peoples Movement	L. Rickie Tulloch	638	6.6
Rose For Progress	Xamayla Rose	545	5.6
Unite to Uplift	Anthony Alexis	119	1.2
Last Chance	Victor Jordan	46	0.5
Write-in		16	0.2
Total votes		9,728	100.0
Democratic hold			

2019 New York City Council Democratic primary, District 45
Party	Candidate	Votes	%
Democratic	Farah Louis (incumbent)	4,690	49.9
Democratic	Monique Chandler-Waterman	4,039	43.0
Democratic	L. Rickie Tulloch	175	1.9
Democratic	Xamayla Rose	163	1.7
Democratic	Jovia A. Radix	132	1.4
Democratic	Adina Sash	95	1.0
Democratic	Victor Jordan	53	0.6
Democratic	Anthony Alexis	46	0.5
Write-in		10	0.1
Total votes		9,403	100.0

2019 New York City Council election, District 45
Party	Candidate	Votes	%
Democratic	Farah Louis (incumbent)	14,068	92.7
Liberal	Anthony Beckford	720	4.7
Libertarian	David Fite	330	2.2
Write-in		57	0.4
Total votes		15,175	100.0
Democratic hold			

Political offices
Preceded by Jumaane Williams	Member of the New York City Council from the 45th district 2019–present	Incumbent
