= Cafritz =

Cafritz is a surname. Notable people with the surname include:

- Julia Cafritz (born 1965), American musician
- Morris Cafritz (1888–1964), American real estate developer and philanthropist
- Peggy Cooper Cafritz (1947–2018), American philanthropist, educator, and civil rights activist
