= Ayelet the Kosher Komic =

Orthodox Jewish female stand-up comedian

Ayelet Newman
- Born: Ayelet Ben Hur; Long Island, New York
- Occupation: Stand-up comedian
- Website: kosherkomedy.com

Ayelet Newman, known by the stage name Ayelet the Kosher Komic, is an Orthodox Jewish female stand-up comedian. She discontinued her acting career and began performing "kosher comedy" to women-only audiences after becoming a baalas teshuva (embracing Orthodox Judaism) in the early 2000s. In 2003 she moved to Jerusalem. She performs both in Israel and internationally.

== Biography ==
Born Ayelet Ben Hur, she grew up in a secular Jewish family in Long Island, New York. After high school, she moved to Los Angeles to audition for roles in TV and film. Among her acting credits are an HBO series, a Lifetime TV movie, and a bit part in the 2003 film The Hebrew Hammer. She also performed stand-up routines on Comedy Central and at the New York Comedy Club and The Improv.

Her career took a 180-degree turn when she began attending Torah classes at the Los Angeles branch of Aish HaTorah, an Orthodox Jewish outreach organization. As she embraced a Torah-observant lifestyle, she quit acting and began performing what she calls "kosher comedy" – stand-up routines that are devoid of off-color humor, vulgar references, cursing, and personal attacks, but that instead focus on the humor in daily life. She also stopped performing in front of men, but plays to female audiences exclusively.

Welcome to Glatt Kosher Airlines. Our pilot and co-pilot will be taking time to pray Mincha and Maariv [the afternoon and evening prayers]. You're asked to pray with extra devotion at this time since no one will be flying the airplane.

— Ayelet the Kosher Komic, "Glatt Kosher Airlines"

Her hour-long show for Orthodox women and seminary girls includes stand-up routines on topics such as modesty, dating, dieting, kosher laws, Jewish prayer, motherhood, and malapropisms in Hebrew. While most of the show is rehearsed, Ayelet does some improvisation. Her signature routine is a pre-flight safety briefing on the fictional "Glatt Kosher Airlines", in which passengers receive emergency instructions such as: "Should there be, God forbid, a rapid change in cabin pressure, a book of psalms will fall from the panel above your head". "Please say your own tehillim [psalms] prior to assisting the small child, elderly passenger or recent baal teshuvah seated next to you".

She has produced the comic audio CDs It's a Frum Frum Life and Life in Israel.

== Personal ==
Since she started her comedy career in the Orthodox Jewish world as a single woman, Ayelet was reluctant to reveal her age to media sources lest it limit her marriage opportunities. She has since married a full-time kollel student and is the mother of 9 .

== See also ==
- Adina Sash
- Meir Kay
- Mendy Pellin
