= Duke Ellington School of the Arts =

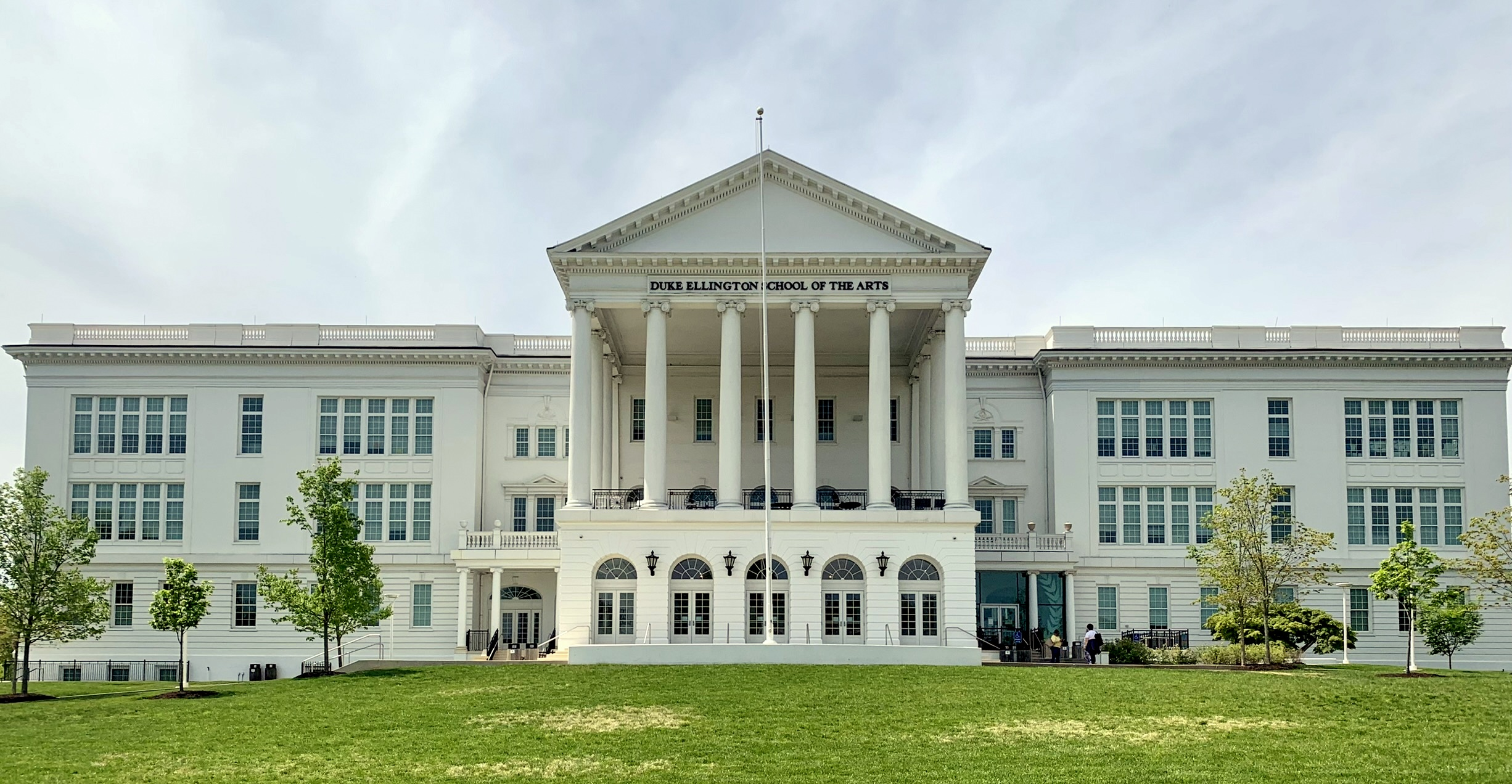
- Duke Ellington School of the Arts in 2022

Location
- 3500 R Street Northwest; Washington, D.C. 20007; United States

Information
- Type: Public high school
- Established: 1974 (52 years ago)
- School district: District of Columbia Public Schools Ward 2
- CEEB code: 090225
- Principal: Sandi M. Logan
- Faculty: 20.0 (on FTE basis)
- Grades: 9 to 12
- Enrollment: 525 (2015-16)
- Student to teacher ratio: 24.55
- Campus type: Urban
- Website: ellingtonarts.org
- Western High School
- U.S. National Register of Historic Places
- D.C. Inventory of Historic Sites
- Location within Washington, D.C.
- Coordinates: 38°54′47″N 77°4′14″W
- Area: less than one acre
- Built: 1898
- Architect: Harry B. Davis, Snowden Ashford
- Architectural style: Classical Revival
- MPS: Public School Buildings of Washington, DC MPS
- NRHP reference No.: 03000673

Significant dates
- Added to NRHP: July 25, 2003
- Designated DCIHS: May 23, 2002

The Duke Ellington School of the Arts (established 1974) is a high school located at 35th Street and R Street, Northwest, Washington, D.C., and dedicated to arts education. One of the high schools of the District of Columbia Public School system, it is named for the American jazz bandleader and composer Duke Ellington, a native of Washington, D.C. The building formerly housed Western High School. The building is listed on the National Register of Historic Places.

Graduates of the school are prepared to pursue an artistic and theatric occupation. In addition to completing the traditional public school college prep curriculum, students must audition for and complete studies in one of the following artistic areas: cinematic arts and media production, dance, museum studies, instrumental music, vocal music, theater, technical design and production, and visual arts.

The school developed from the collaborative efforts of Peggy Cooper Cafritz, a long-time member of the D.C. School Board and Mike Malone, a veteran of Broadway, off-Broadway, contemporary dancer, director, and master choreographer, who were co-founders of Workshops for Careers in the Arts in 1968. In 1974 this workshop program developed into the Duke Ellington School of the Arts at Western High School, an accredited four-year public high school program combining arts and academics. It is currently operated as a joint partnership between D.C. Public Schools, the Kennedy Center, and George Washington University.

== Students and faculty ==
Ellington currently serves approximately 500 students in grades 9–12. Most students commute in from outside of Ward 2, where the school is situated. The academic faculty is fully credentialed and includes seven Fulbright scholars, various PhDs, and DCPS's only national board certified teacher (NBCT) in young adulthood English/language arts. Many of the arts faculty are alumni of the school.

== Academics ==
Ranked as one of D.C. Public Schools' top high schools, Ellington's curriculum requires students earn 34% more credits than those at other D.C. public high schools. Students must maintain a minimum grade point average in both academics and the arts to be permitted to perform and, ultimately, to stay enrolled at Ellington. The school has a 99% on-time graduation rate.

== Arts ==
Ellington's mission is to emphasize the arts as much as academics. It offers training in eight disciplines: Dance, Cinematic Arts and Media Production, Museum Studies, Instrumental or Vocal Music, Theater, Technical Design and Production, and Visual Arts.

In support of their arts program, the school has offered master classes taught by accomplished artists such as Wynton Marsalis, Billy Taylor, Lynn Whitfield, and Lionel Hampton.

The school is recognized for, among other things, its award-winning Duke Ellington Show Choir. Founded by Samuel L. E. Bonds Sr. in 1986, the Choir performs all types of music including Broadway, Gospel, Spirituals, Opera, Jazz, and R&B. Samuel L. E. Bonds Sr., who retired from the school in 2018, studied with Todd Duncan and still teaches private lessons. Students in the Choir are required to continue performing academically, maintaining a minimum grade point average of 3.0. As well as performing as part of an ensemble, they are also allowed to focus on solo work. It performs a holiday show of Amahl and the Night Visitors yearly.

== Application process ==
In order to be admitted into Ellington, students must complete an admissions application and audition before a panel. Upon passing the audition students take an academic assessment test, and complete a family interview.

== Relocation controversy ==
In January 2010, The Washington Post reported that the D.C. government was studying a plan to relocate the school to a new site near Union Station. Jack Evans, the D.C. Council member for the school's host ward, advocated the plan as a way to move the school to a more "central" location relative to its student body, as well to allow the current Ellington site to revert to a standard neighborhood school. Opposition from students, parents, alumni, and others has been strong, including online petitions and a Facebook group with over 1,700 members. Shortly after The Washington Post report, D.C. Schools Chancellor Michelle Rhee announced that the school will not be moved in the near future.

== Renovation ==
In 2017, a three-year renovation of the school was completed. The improvements cost $178.5 million, $100 million (127.39%) more than projected. The project became an example of the district's failure to prevent cost overruns.

== Notable alumni ==
Western High School

- Ruth Chew, author
- Barbara J. Fields, historian
- Eugene B. Fluckey, United States Navy rear admiral, recipient of the Medal of Honor and four Navy Crosses for actions during World War II
- Ernest W. Gibson III, Associate Justice of the Vermont Supreme Court
- Solange Hertz, Catholic author
- John M. Kemper (1912–1971), Military Historian and 11th Headmaster of Phillips Academy
- George Van Horn Moseley Jr., United States Army officer who served in World War II
- Thomas A. Rymer (1925–2016), Maryland state delegate and judge
- Gloria Steinem, feminist activist
- John Whelchel, United States Navy vice admiral and football coach

Duke Ellington School for the Arts

- Dave Chappelle, comedian
- Michaela Angela Davis, Essence magazine Executive Fashion & Beauty Editor, writer, author, commentator, and speaker
- Matthew Dickens, actor/singer/dancer and writer/producer/director
- Johnny Gill, R&B singer
- Denyce Graves, opera singer
- Corey Hawkins, Actor, opera singer
- Tracy Inman, dancer with Alvin Ailey American Dance Theater and co-director of The Ailey School
- Simbi Khali, actress
- Ari Lennox, singer
- Meshell Ndegeocello, bassist, singer
- Serena Reeder, Actress
- Wallace Roney, jazz trumpeter
- Lamman Rucker, actor
- Adam Serwer, journalist and author
- Tony Terry, singer
- Mary Timony, musician
- Marja Vallila, sculptor
- Samira Wiley, Actress

== See also ==
- Duke Ellington
