= Sue M. Cobb =

American politician

Sue M. Cobb O.J.
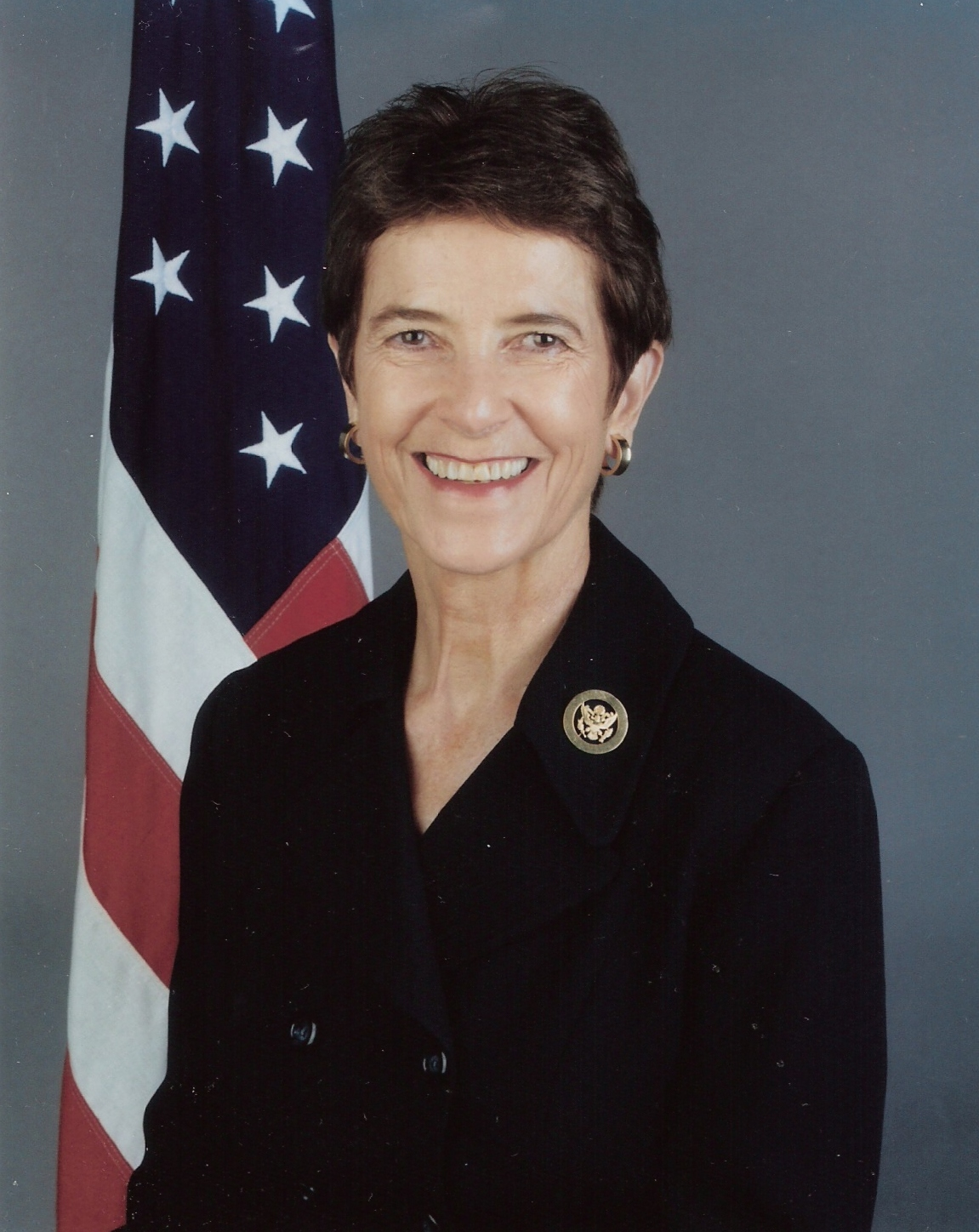

26th Secretary of State of Florida
- In office December 2005 – January 2007
- Governor: Jeb Bush; Charlie Crist
- Preceded by: David E. Mann
- Succeeded by: Kurt S. Browning

United States Ambassador to Jamaica
- In office September 2001 – 2005
- President: George W. Bush
- Preceded by: Stanley Louis McLelland
- Succeeded by: Brenda LaGrange Johnson

Personal details
- Born: August 18, 1937 (age 88) Los Angeles, California, U.S.
- Spouse: Charles E. Cobb
- Education: Stanford University (BA); University of Miami (JD)

Sue McCourt Cobb, O.J. (born August 18, 1937, in Los Angeles, California) served as Secretary of State of Florida from 2005 to 2007 and held the position of United States Ambassador to Jamaica from 2001 to 2005. She was the first woman to be appointed to that position. She has served as managing director and General Counsel for Cobb Partners Inc., a private investment, venture capital, real estate and resort development company in Coral Gables, Florida. Cobb previously served on the Board of Directors of BankUnited.

Cobb received her undergraduate degree from Stanford University in 1959. After moving to Florida in 1972, she received her Juris Doctor degree from the University of Miami School of Law. She entered public service in 1999 as Secretary of the Florida Lottery. From September 2001 to 2005, Cobb served as the United States Ambassador to Jamaica. She was Secretary of State of Florida from December 2005 to January 2007. Throughout 2002–2008, she was engaged at the U.S. Department of State's Leadership and Management School as co-chair of periodic mandatory seminars for newly designated U.S. ambassadors. The U.S. State Department Sue M. Cobb Award for Exemplary Diplomatic Service is awarded annually at the Department Award Ceremony to the individual selected from worldwide nominations as the most outstanding non-career United States Ambassador.

In addition to BankUnited, Cobb sits on the board of directors of the Center for Strategic and International Studies and The Council of American Ambassadors. She is an active member of the Council on Foreign Relations and the Center for Hemispheric Policy at the University of Miami.

She has authored a book entitled The Edge of Everest, an account of her travels through China and Tibet and her attempt to be the first woman from the United States to reach the summit of Mount Everest. She is married to Charles E. Cobb. They reside in Coral Gables, Florida.

Political offices
Preceded by David E. Mann; Interim	Secretary of State of Florida; 2005–2007	Succeeded by Kurt S. Browning
Diplomatic posts
Preceded by Stanley Louis McLelland	United States Ambassador to Jamaica; 2001–2005	Succeeded by Pamela E. Bridgewater
