= Algernon J. Cooper =

American politician

Mayor of Prichard, Alabama
- In office 1972 – June 1, 1980
- Preceded by: Vernon O. Capps

Personal details
- Born: Algernon Johnson Cooper, Jr. May 30, 1944 (age 82) Mobile, Alabama, U.S.
- Party: Democratic
- Education: University of Notre Dame; New York University
- Nickname: Jay

Algernon Johnson Cooper, Jr. (born May 30, 1944) is an American politician and lawyer who served as the mayor of Prichard, Alabama. Cooper was one of the first black elected officials in Prichard, and one of the first black mayors in the modern era.

== Early life ==
Algernon Johnson Cooper, Jr. was born on May 30, 1944, in Mobile, Alabama, to Gladys Catherine Mouton and Algernon Johnson Cooper, Sr. (died 1968). His sister is the noted philanthropist and socialite Peggy Cooper Cafritz, and they were raised Catholic.

Cooper attended St. Peter Claver Elementary School in Mobile, Alabama, until he was sent to Marmion Academy in Aurora, Illinois, in 1958, where he was the first black student, and graduated in 1962. He graduated from the University of Notre Dame in 1966 with a B.A. degree. In 1969, he earned a Juris Doctor degree from New York University.

Cooper's brother, J. Gary Cooper, was elected to the Alabama House of Representatives.

== Career ==
In 1967, Cooper became a member of United States Senator Robert F. Kennedy's staff and later served on Kennedy's presidential campaign in 1968. Cooper was with Kennedy at the time of Kennedy's assassination. Cooper attended Kennedy's funeral and escorted Coretta Scott King on the funeral train.

From 1968 to 1969, Cooper served as national treasurer of the American Bar Association's Law Student Division. In 1968, Cooper founded the Black American Law Students Association. On December 18, 1970, Cooper became the first black member of the Mobile Bar Association after a secret vote was held. An attempt was made to waive the secret vote and to instead use a voice vote, which would have required unanimous approval for Cooper's membership, but was unsuccessful.

In 1970, he represented the NAACP Legal Defense Fund during a challenge to the constitutionality of Alabama's freedom of choice school desegregation law. On September 8, 1970, he threatened to take parents who refused to send their children to segregated schools rather than the integrated schools their children were assigned to federal court.

=== Mayor ===
==== Elections ====
In 1972, Cooper ran for mayor of Prichard, Alabama, where segregationist Governor George Wallace would give his annual Labor Day speech, and placed first out of seven candidates in the initial primary with incumbent Mayor Vernon O. Capps, who had served as mayor since 1960, in second place. In the general election Cooper defeated Capps becoming the first black elected official in Prichard.

Cooper is incorrectly stated as the first black mayor in Alabama since the end of Reconstruction and the first black person to defeat a white incumbent mayor in Alabama. The first black person to do so was Andrew Hayden in Uniontown, Alabama.

Cooper was reelected in 1976, against city council member Alford Turner and Fleicito Ramos.

==== Tenure ====
In 1972, Cooper was inaugurated as mayor of Prichard, Alabama. From October 14 to 15, Cooper alongside four other black mayors in Alabama organized the Alabama Conference of Black Mayors. Cooper later served as chairman of the conference.

On October 27, 1972, Cooper endorsed John Sparkman during the United States Senate election over John L. LeFlore, the only black candidate running, as Cooper believed that LeFlore could not win. However, Cooper stated that he had differences with Sparkman "on legislation concerned with civil rights". Cooper also stated that the election of Republican nominee Winton M. Blount would be "a disaster for Alabama because, unlike John Sparkman, he has no feeling for the people".

In 1975, James Dotson Fail Sr., a white man, was arrested and charged with assault with intent to murder after a gunshot was fired into Cooper's house. Fail was later sentenced to two years in prison.

On June 7, 1978, Cooper was indicted by a federal grand jury for demanding and receiving $5,581.86 from J. E. Harris and his company in June 1975. Cooper was the third member of Prichard's city government to be indicted during a corruption investigation. Cooper pleaded innocent at trial and was found not guilty by a jury on September 14.

On October 11, 1978, Cooper filed his letter of resignation to a member of the city council, but later stated on October 12, that he had done so during an act of frustration and that he was not formally resigning. In 1980, Cooper was appointed as an aide to United States House and Urban Development Secretary Moon Landrieu, and on June 1, 1980, Cooper resigned from the mayoralty to serve as an aide full-time.

=== Alabama Legislature campaigns ===
In November 1979, Cain Kennedy, a member of the Alabama House of Representatives from the 98th district, was appointed as a state court judge by Governor Fob James. James declared a special election to be held on January 29, to fill the vacancy created by Kennedy's appointment. Cooper chose to run in the special election, but lacked the residency requirement. Former Attorney General Bill Baxley filed a petition to the Alabama Democratic Executive Committee challenging Cooper's campaign for the house seat due to his lack of residency. Cooper was removed from the ballot, which Cooper did not contest, and Cooper later endorsed Bonnie Hicks for the House seat.

In 2007, Cooper served as the Democratic nominee for the Alabama Senate in the 32nd district, but was defeated by Republican nominee Trip Pittman.

== See also ==
- List of first African-American mayors
