= Great Americans =

Great Americans may refer to:

- Great Americans series, a set of definitive stamps issued by the United States Postal Service from 1980 through 2002
- GreatAmericans.com, an online video site
- Hall of Fame for Great Americans, an outdoor sculpture garden in Bronx Community College in The Bronx, New York City

== See also ==
- Great American (disambiguation)
