= Peggy Cooper Cafritz =

American civil rights activist, educator, philanthropist, art collector

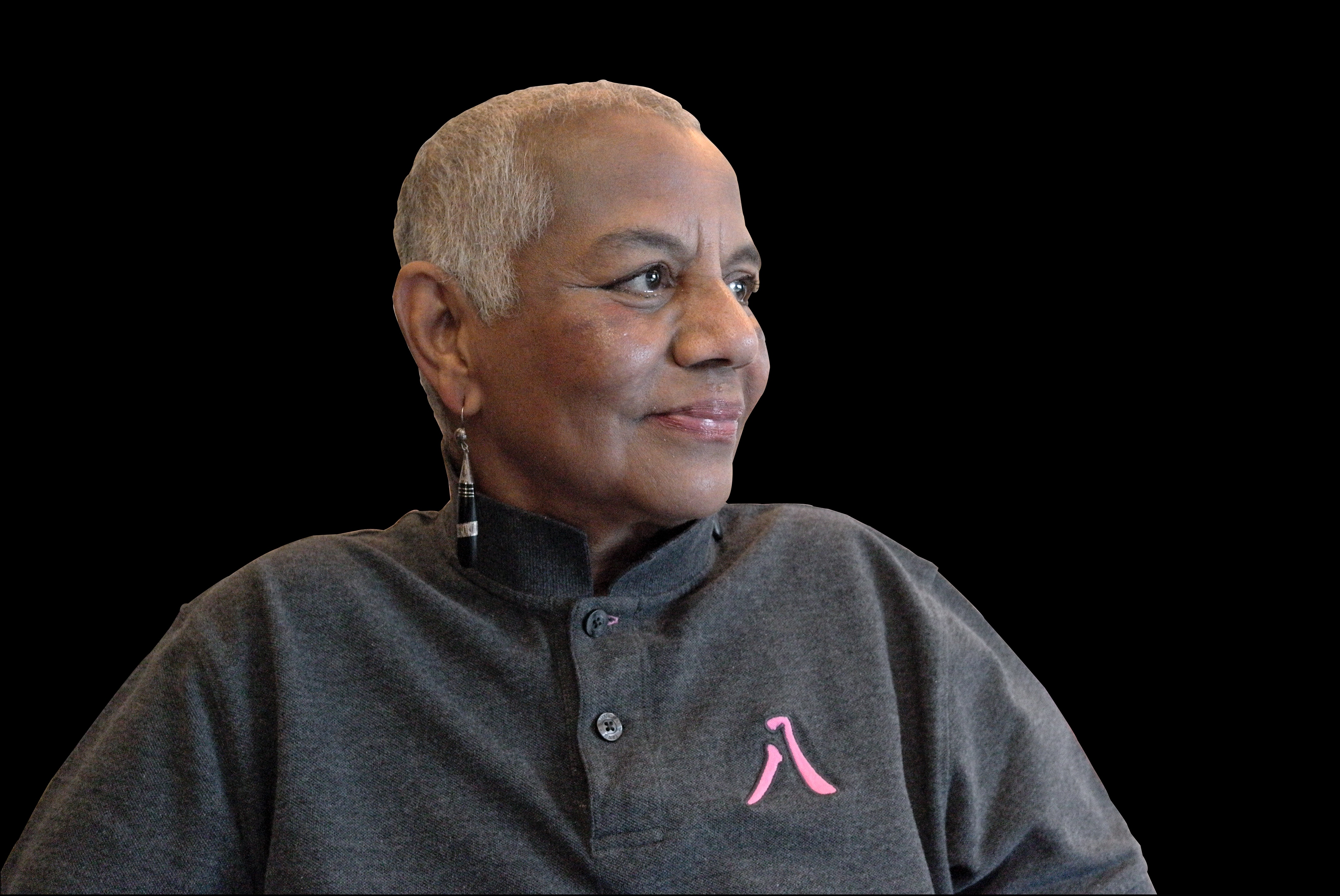
- Born: Pearl Alice Cooper; April 7, 1947; Mobile, Alabama, U.S.
- Died: February 18, 2018 (aged 70); Washington, D.C., U.S.
- Other name: Peggy Cooper
- Education: Saint Mary's Academy; George Washington University
- Occupations: Art collector, educator, civil rights activist, philanthropist
- Years active: 1960s–2018
- Spouse: Conrad Cafritz (m. 1981–1998)
- Children: 3

Peggy Cooper Cafritz (born Pearl Alice Cooper; April 7, 1947 – February 18, 2018) was an American art collector, educator, civil rights activist, philanthropist, and socialite.

== Early life and education ==
=== Family life ===
Born Pearl Alice Cooper, Peggy Cafritz belonged to one of the wealthiest African American families in Mobile, Alabama. She later changed her name legally to her childhood nickname, "Peggy." The Cooper family gained their wealth through Peggy's father, Algernon Johnson Cooper Sr., who owned insurance and mortuary businesses across the state. Her father and her mother, nee Gladys Mouton, were socially acquainted with famous jazz musician Duke Ellington, namesake of the Duke Ellington School of the Arts, which Cafritz would go on to co-found.

=== Elementary school ===
Cafritz was raised Catholic in the segregated Jim Crow South. As a child, she attended a Catholic elementary school for Black children.

Cafritz traced her love of art to her childhood, at least to the age of seven or eight, when she was mesmerized by her parents' print of the painting Bottle and Fishes by Georges Braque, a French cubist. She studied it closely, rearranging elements of the painting in her mind, and, as she grew older, inventing stories based on it. Her mother furthered this appreciation of visual art by sitting with her as they looked through coffee-table books on art. Around this time, she developed a love of reading, both from the library of children's books kept in the family room, and from sneaking into her father's private library, which was filled with classics of the Western canon, as well as books by and about Black people. Reading James Baldwin's Notes of a Native Son as a child was a formative experience. It introduced her to the idea that one could both love the United States and negatively criticize it, "a license which I would use for the rest of my life."

In sixth grade, Cafritz had the opportunity to meet Martin Luther King Jr. With her father, she attended a talk King gave while promoting his book Stride Toward Freedom: The Montgomery Story. Afterward, Dr. King came to her family's home and signed a copy of his book for her, saying "that I should aspire to be a quiet, strategic leader like my dad."

At age 10, Cafritz was sent to a Catholic summer camp in Michigan, where she was the only Black camper. Her father sent here there knowingly, believing it was important for her to get to know the white world. There she was the only camper put into a cabin alone, and she faced racist pranks, such as when other campers would tell her her mother had to come to visit, only for her to encounter another camper's Black maid. When she called home crying, her father told her she needed to learn how to deal with such racism, because she would encounter it her all her life. She was sent again the following year.

=== High school ===
After her father tried to enroll his eldest son in a whites-only Jesuit high school, Cafritz and her siblings were banned from attending their local Catholic high schools. Instead, she was sent to boarding school at the predominantly white Saint Mary's Academy in Indiana. In 1962, her junior year of high school, she met the family of Dr. Roland Wesley Chamblee and his wife, Dorothy. The Chamblees for years had welcomed many Black students into their home, where they had lively debates about religion, race, and morals. Cafritz credits the Chamblees for influencing not only "how I see formal art, but the beauty of my Black body, mind, and soul." Her high school experience furthered her interest in art by providing her many field trips to Chicago, where they attended plays, symphonies, and art exhibits.

The summer after graduating from high school, Cafritz and her friends decided to test the Civil Rights Act of 1964, which had recently been passed. They visited Mobile restaurants and, if the restaurant refused to serve them, they would report it to the Justice Department. When Cafritz and her friends buzzed for service at a drive-in restaurant, several white teenage boys approached their car, spat on them, threw soda through their car window, and jumped on the trunk and hood of the car, rocking it back and forth. Two police officers watched from nearby but did nothing. Cafritz and her friends were scared to drive away, afraid they would end up in prison if one of the boys on the car were injured, so they stayed inside the car until the boys left. Cafritz never spent another summer in Mobile.

=== College and law school ===
In 1964, during the civil rights movement, Cafritz moved to Washington, D.C., to attend George Washington University (GW). As soon as she arrived, she learned the school had not accepted very many Black students, and that segregation was still the norm there. She later wrote, "It almost made me happy. I just knew that I could use the skillset my father had forced me to develop to serve a great plate of change." She began this work on the first day of orientation, when she joined with other Black students to try to join fraternities and sororities, a move that attracted the press, forcing the university to publicly speak about their segregated Greek system. "Thus began my career as an activist in D.C.," she wrote.

Whille at GW, she helped create the Black Student Union (then called the Black Peoples Union) and worked successfully for the integration of fraternities and sororities. Being in D.C. also gave her the opportunity to visit all the Smithsonian museums and take trips to New York City to visit museums there, as well. She discussed with her friends their shared frustration with the exclusion of Black people from the museum world as well as the performing arts and other cultural institutions.

Cafritz went on to attend George Washington University Law School, and received her J.D. degree in 1971.

After Cafritz's father died by suicide during her first year in law school, Cafritz took out a loan to keep her youngest brother in boarding school. She said her father's suicide stemmed from financial difficulties.

== Career ==
Cafritz wanted to bring the money of the white people and the power of the black people in Washington, D.C., together in unity.

=== Early career ===
In 1972, Cafritz began work at Post-Newsweek stations, later renamed Graham Media Group, where she was an assistant to Harry Belafonte and M. Carl Holman, president of the National Urban Coalition. She also began making documentaries, a job in which she was tenacious. When she was unable to get an appointment to meet with the painter Jacob Lawrence for a documentary she wanted to make about him, she got his travel schedule and flew to Chicago's O’Hare Airport, where she found him getting off a plane and convinced him to speak with her. The two became lifelong friends.

In addition to working at Post-Newsweek, she also worked throughout the 1970s as a documentary producer for the D.C. television station WTOP (now WUSA) and as an arts reviewer at D.C.'s PBS affiliate, WETA. Over the course of this work, she earned both Emmy and Peabody awards.

=== Duke Ellington School of the Arts ===
In 1968, while still a student at GW, Cafritz chaired a Black Arts Festival, sponsored by the Black Peoples Union and held in partnership with DC Public Schools and the city's Parks and Recreation department. The festival gave city kids an opportunity to be both participants and performers in the arts, while interacting with Black professionals who exposed them to a variety of career paths. One such professional was Emmett J. Rice, future head of the Federal Reserve, and his wife Lois Rice, who served on the College Board and helped create the Pell Grant. While working on the festival, Cafritz became good friends with GW grad student and choreographer Mike Malone. When she lamented to him that the students at the festival had some real talent and it was a shame they didn't have the training to further that talent, the two friends decided to start a school. When she told her father of the plan, he encouraged her to keep the goal a secret so no one could tell them “no."

Cafritz turned that first festival into a regular summer arts festival. The president of GW, Lloyd H. Elliott, gave her free space at GW but asked her to fundraise for it, connecting her with one donor, who introduced her to others. In the program's second year, their faculty included the Emmy-award-winning dancer Debbie Allen. Cafritz and Malone kept the summer festivals, renamed the Workshops for Careers in the Arts, focused on giving the least fortunate among D.C.’s students an opportunity for arts education they wouldn't otherwise have. After six long years, they finally succeeded in opening the public magnet school Duke Ellington School of the Arts in Georgetown in 1974. It was modeled after New York City's High School of Performing Arts.

Cafritz and Malone's goal was to start an arts-education program for local children who had shown promise but had no outlet to demonstrate their potential. Ellington was the only public high school in Washington, D.C., to train students with a curriculum in both academics and intensive professional arts training. Cafritz wanted students to defy the common art world belief that artists of color needed to eschew abstract art in favor of making narrative art that addressed inequality. Cafritz's ultimate hope was for artists of color to have absolute freedom to make any art they chose, to continue on to higher education, and to take up leadership positions in the art world.

Ellington alumni include Dave Chappelle, Denyce Graves, Hank Willis Thomas, and Meshell Ndegeocello.

Ellington continued to be important to Cafritz for the rest of her life, and she took on several roles within the school and its fundraising organization, the Ellington Fund. Even years after the school was established, Cafritz wrote, "the overwhelming percentage of my energy was spent institutionalizing the Duke Ellington School of the Arts, so that it could permanently serve talented children in D.C., especially those who needed it most."

=== Contributions to the Art World ===
Cafritz began her art collection in college by purchasing several pieces of African art brought back from the continent by members of Howard University's Student Nonviolent Coordinating Committee, some of whom had dropped out of college and supported themselves by reselling art they bought in Africa. Another person from whom she purchased art while still a student was Warren M. Robbins, whose collection of African art would later lead to the creation of the Smithsonian's National Museum of African Art.

Cafritz's relationship with Conrad Cafritz, who was also born into wealth and was a successful real estate developer, conplimented her ability to become a serious art collector. She was critical of the lack of inclusion of and opportunity for Black artists in the mainstream American art world, and her interest in racial equity was linked to her values as an art collector. As she continued to visit museums, and got to know scores of young artists as they graduated from Ellington and fought to begin artistic careers, the more her interest in the arts became enmeshed with her values in the political and social arenas. She got involved in the political side of the arts, and she made it her “purpose that this nation face the absence, the erasure, the impermanence, the non-inclusion of African Americans in our cultural treasure.” In 1968, she became a founding member of the DC Commission on the Arts and Humanities, which she also chaired from 1989 to 1999. In 1989 she became co-chair of the Smithsonian's Cultural Equity Committee. She was the youngest trustee ever appointed to the American Film Institute. She joined the Painting and Sculpture Acquisitions Committee at the Whitney Museum of American Art.

In 2009, a house fire destroyed her home in D.C.'s Kent neighborhood, ravaging the eight-bedroom architectural landmark where she held salons and kept her art collection, one of the largest private collections of African American and African art. Among those 300 works destroyed in the fire were works by Jacob Lawrence and Romare Bearden. She reached a settlement with the District of Columbia Water and Sewer Authority over the fire for their inadequate pressure in the hydrants.

Cafritz moved to Dupont Circle in 2010 and continued to grow her collection. Included in the Cafritz collection is Carrie Mae Weems, El Anatsui, Chris Ofili, Mickalene Thomas, Glenn Ligon, Simone Leigh, Titus Kaphar, LaToya Ruby Frazier, William Villalongo, Tschabalala Self, Nathaniel Mary Quinn and Njideka Akunyili Crosby, whose work is featured on the cover of a 2018 book about Cafritz's collection. Upon her death, she bequeathed more than 250 works by Black artists to the Duke Ellington School of the Arts and over 400 to the Studio Museum in Harlem, marking the largest gift ever made of contemporary art by artists of African descent.

Cafritz was the first collector for many visual artists and has sponsored many projects including Spike Lee's Malcolm X.

=== Other Positions and Accomplishments ===
In the 1970s, she was the youngest fellow of Woodrow Wilson International Center for Scholars.

Cafritz was DC school board president from 2000 to 2006.

== Personal life ==
In Cafritz's 2018 book, she called her professional life “spectacularly lucky” but her emotional life “tumultuous, sometimes tortured.” The comfort she received from art, she wrote, is one of the things that drove her art collecting, along with its social and cultural impact.

In 1981, after living together for eight years, Cafritz married multimillionaire real estate executive Conrad Cafritz, son of the real estate developer and philanthropist Morris Cafritz. She was Catholic and he was Jewish. Together they had three children, the first of whom was born after the assistance of in vitro fertilization, made necessary by Cafritz's endometriosis. They adopted two other children. The couple divorced in 1998; in the divorce documents, Peggy said her husband had cheated on her and had contempt for her friends and family who were black.

Her oldest brother J. Gary Cooper, served as United States Ambassador to Jamaica, her brother, Algernon J. Cooper Jr., was elected the first Black mayor of Prichard, Alabama, one of the first Black mayors in the modern era, and her younger brother, Mario Cooper (1954-2015), was an AIDS activist and Democratic Party political strategist.

Cafritz had many mentees, unofficial foster children, and several godchildren, including Susan Rice and her brother, John Rice.

Cafritz was a prominent figure in the Washington, D.C., social scene, socializing with cultural and political figures including Quincy Jones, Gloria Steinem, Bill Clinton, Vernon Jordan, and Alma Powell.

== Death ==
Cafritz died in Washington, D.C., on February 18, 2018, from complications from pneumonia after a period of declining health.

== Works and publications ==
- Cafritz, Peggy Cooper (2018). Fired Up! Ready to Go! Finding Beauty, Demanding Equity. The African American Art Collections of Peggy Cooper Cafritz. New York: Rizzoli International Publications. ISBN 978-0-847-86058-6. OCLC 1021038973.
