= New York City's 45th City Council district =

- Boundaries following the 2020 census

Government
  - Councilmember: . Farah Louis. D–Flatlands

Population (2010)
  - Total: 140,433

Demographics
  - Black: 76%
  - White: 11%
  - Hispanic: 8%
  - Asian: 3%
  - Other: 3%

Registration
  - Democratic: 76.7%
  - Republican: 6.1%
  - No party preference: 14.8%
- Registered voters (2021) 107,414

New York City's 45th City Council district is one of 51 districts in the New York City Council. It has been represented by Democrat Farah Louis since a 2019 special election to replace fellow Democrat Jumaane Williams.

== Geography ==
District 45 is based in East Flatbush and Flatlands in Brooklyn, also covering parts of Flatbush, Midwood, Marine Park, and Kensington.

The district overlaps with Brooklyn Community Boards 12, 14, 15, 17, and 18, and with New York's 8th and 9th congressional districts. It also overlaps with the 17th, 19th, 21st, and 22nd districts of the New York State Senate, and with the 41st, 42nd, 44th, 48th, 58th, and 59th districts of the New York State Assembly.

== Members representing the district ==
Members	Party	Years served	Electoral history
District established January 1, 1992
Susan Alter (East Flatbush)	Democratic	January 1, 1992 – December 31, 1993	Redistricted from the 25th district and re-elected in 1991. Retired and ran for New York City Public Advocate.
Lloyd Henry (Flatbush)	Democratic	January 1, 1994 – December 31, 2001	Elected in 1993. Re-elected in 1997. Termed out.
Kendall Stewart (East Flatbush)	Democratic	January 1, 2002 – December 31, 2009	Elected in 2001. Re-elected in 2003. Re-elected in 2005. Lost renomination and lost re-election as an Independent.
Jumaane Williams (Canarsie)	Democratic	January 1, 2010 – March 19, 2019	Elected in 2009. Re-elected in 2013. Re-elected in 2017. Resigned when elected as New York City Public Advocate.
Vacant		March 19, 2019 – June 13, 2019	
Farah Louis (Flatlands)	Democratic	June 13, 2019 –	Elected to finish Williams's term. Re-elected in 2021. Re-elected in 2023. Re-elected in 2025.

== Recent election results ==
=== 2025 ===
2025 New York City Council election, District 45
Party	Candidate	Votes	%
Democratic	Farah Louis (incumbent)	33,182	84.3
Republican	Elijah Diaz	3,720	
Conservative	Elijah Diaz	796	
Total	Elijah Diaz	4,516	11.5
Safe & Affordable	Hatem El-Gamasy	1,549	3.9
Write-in		120	0.3
Total votes		39,367	100.0
Democratic hold			

=== 2023 (redistricting) ===
Due to redistricting and the 2020 changes to the New York City Charter, councilmembers elected during the 2021 and 2023 City Council elections will serve two-year terms, with full four-year terms resuming after the 2025 New York City Council elections.

2023 New York City Council election, District 45
Party	Candidate	Votes	%
Democratic	Farah Louis (incumbent)	8,750	96.7
Write-in		298	3.3
Total votes		9,048	100.0
Democratic hold			

=== 2021 ===
In 2019, voters in New York City approved Ballot Question 1, which implemented ranked-choice voting in all local elections. Under the new system, voters have the option to rank up to five candidates for every local office. Voters whose first-choice candidates fare poorly will have their votes redistributed to other candidates in their ranking until one candidate surpasses the 50 percent threshold. If one candidate surpasses 50 percent in first-choice votes, then ranked-choice tabulations will not occur.

An interactive map of District 45

2021 New York City Council election, District 45
Primary election
Party	Candidate	Votes	%
Democratic	Farah Louis (incumbent)	14,544	75.4
Democratic	Anthony Beckford	3,819	19.8
Democratic	Cyril Joseph	818	4.2
Write-in		116	0.6
Total votes		19,297	100
General election
Democratic	Farah Louis (incumbent)	19,206	93.5
Our Flatbush	Lou Cespedes	1,158	5.6
Write-in		165	0.9
Total votes		20,529	100
Democratic hold			

=== 2019 special ===
In 2019, Councilman Jumaane Williams was elected New York City Public Advocate, leaving his seat vacant. Two special elections were scheduled to fill his seat: one nonpartisan election in May, followed by a standard partisan primary and general election that June and September. Both were won by Farah Louis.

2019 New York City Council special election, District 45
Primary election
Party	Candidate	Votes	%
Democratic	Farah Louis (incumbent)	4,690	49.9
Democratic	Monique Chandler-Waterman	4,039	43.0
Democratic	L. Rickie Tulloch	175	1.9
Democratic	Xamayla Rose	163	1.7
Democratic	Jovia Radix	132	1.4
Democratic	Adina Sash	95	1.0
Democratic	Victor Jordan	53	0.6
Democratic	Anthony Alexis	46	0.5
Write-in		10	0.1
Total votes		9,403	100
General election
Democratic	Farah Louis (incumbent)	14,068	92.7
Liberal	Anthony Beckford	720	4.7
Libertarian	David Fite	330	2.2
Write-in		55	0.4
Total votes		15,173	100
Democratic hold			

2019 New York City Council special election, District 45
Party	Candidate	Votes	%
A Unified 45	Farah Louis	3,949	40.6
A Vital Voice	Monique Chandler-Waterman	2,848	29.3
Justice for All	Jovia Radix	871	9.0
Community First	Adina Sash	696	7.2
Peoples Movement	L. Rickie Tulloch	638	6.6
Rose for Progress	Xamayla Rose	545	5.6
Unite to Uplift	Anthony Alexis	119	1.2
Last Chance	Victor Jordan	46	0.5
Write-in		16	0.2
Total votes		9,728	100

=== 2017 ===
2017 New York City Council election, District 45
Primary election
Party	Candidate	Votes	%
Democratic	Jumaane Williams (incumbent)	9,008	90.0
Democratic	Lou Cespedes	948	9.5
Write-in		51	0.5
Total votes		10,007	100
General election
Democratic	Jumaane Williams	19,963	
Working Families	Jumaane Williams	1,116	
Total	Jumaane Williams (incumbent)	21,079	96.5
True Freedom	Anthony Beckford	644	2.9
Write-in		111	0.6
Total votes		21,834	100
Democratic hold			

=== 2013 ===
2013 New York City Council election, District 45
Primary election
Party	Candidate	Votes	%
Democratic	Jumaane Williams (incumbent)	10,332	76.5
Democratic	Jean Similien	1,674	12.4
Democratic	Godwin Williams	1,498	11.1
Write-in		2	0.0
Total votes		13,506	100
General election
Democratic	Jumaane Williams	20,427	
Working Families	Jumaane Williams	927	
Total	Jumaane Williams (incumbent)	21,354	96.3
Rent Is Too Damn High	Erlene King	702	3.2
Write-in		123	0.5
Total votes		22,179	100
Democratic hold			
