= J. Gary Cooper =

American politician (1936–2024)

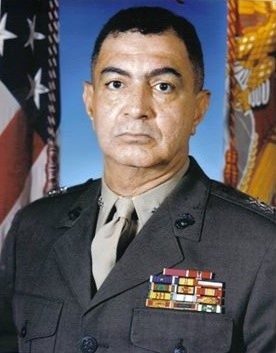
- Cooper as a Marine Corps Major General

United States Ambassador to Jamaica
- In office 1994–1997

Personal details
- Born: Jerome Gary Cooper; October 2, 1936 Lafayette, Louisiana, U.S.
- Died: April 27, 2024 (aged 87) Mobile, Alabama, U.S.
- Education: University of Notre Dame (BS)
- Awards: Distinguished Service Medal; Bronze Star; Purple Heart (2); Legion of Merit; Gallantry Cross (South Vietnam)

Military service
- Allegiance: United States
- Branch/service: United States Marines
- Years of service: 1958–1989
- Rank: Major General
- Battles/wars: Vietnam War

Jerome Gary Cooper (October 2, 1936 – April 27, 2024) was an officer of the United States Marine Corps who served as Assistant Secretary of the Air Force (Manpower & Reserve Affairs) from 1989 to 1992, and as United States Ambassador to Jamaica from 1994 to 1997.

== Biography ==
Cooper was born on October 2, 1936, in Lafayette, Louisiana. He later attended Most Pure Heart of Mary High School in Mobile, Alabama, graduating in 1954. He was then educated at the University of Notre Dame, receiving a B.S. degree in finance in 1958. The June 1958 commencement program lists him as Gary Mouton Cooper (Mouton was his mother's maiden name).

After participating in Naval ROTC during college, Cooper joined the United States Marine Corps. In 1967 during the Vietnam War, he became the first African American to command a U.S. Marine Corps infantry company and led it into combat. He left the Marine Corps in 1970. During his time in the Marine Corps, he was awarded the Navy Distinguished Service Medal, the Legion of Merit, the Bronze Star Medal, two Purple Hearts and three Republic of Vietnam Gallantry Crosses.

In 1970, Cooper left the Marine Corps, though he continued to serve as a major in the United States Marine Corps Reserve. From 1970, he was director of an insurance company and funeral home that had been owned by his family for decades in Mobile, Alabama. He was elected to the Alabama Legislature in 1973. In 1978, the Governor of Alabama named Cooper to his cabinet, with Cooper becoming Commissioner of the Alabama State Department of Human Resources.

Cooper attended the program for Senior Executives in Government at Harvard University in 1979. He joined David Volkert and Associates, a regional engineering and architectural firm in Mobile, Alabama, as vice president for marketing in 1981.

In 1988, Cooper returned to active duty in the Marine Corps, being promoted to major general and becoming director of personnel at Headquarters Marine Corps. He retired from the Marine Corps in 1989, when President of the United States George H. W. Bush nominated Cooper to be Assistant Secretary of the Air Force (Manpower & Reserve Affairs) and, after Senate confirmation, he held this office until 1992. In this capacity, he played a role in planning the Gulf War.

Cooper returned to David Volkert and associates in 1992. In 1994, President Bill Clinton named Cooper United States Ambassador to Jamaica, and Cooper presented his credentials to Governor-General of Jamaica Sir Howard Cooke on November 4, 1994. He left his post as ambassador on November 27, 1997.

Cooper returned to his home in Mobile in December 1997. He later became CEO of Commonwealth National Bank, and has served on the Board of Directors of GenCorp, U.S. Steel, Protective Life, and PNC Financial Services.

== Personal life ==
Cooper was the son of Algernon Johnson Cooper Sr. and Gladys Catherine (Mouton) Cooper.

Cooper was Catholic, and his family was the first to have three generations of African Americans attend Notre Dame.

His siblings include Algernon J. Cooper Jr., one of the first Black mayors in the nation; Peggy Cooper Cafritz, a notable civil rights activist and major donor to the arts in Washington, DC; and Mario Cooper (1954-2015), an AIDS activist and Democratic Party political strategist.

Cooper was divorced and had a son and two daughters. He died in Mobile, Alabama, on April 27, 2024, at the age of 87.

Government offices
Preceded by Karen R. Keesling	Assistant Secretary of the Air Force (Manpower & Reserve Affairs); 1989–1992	Succeeded by ???
Diplomatic posts
Preceded by Lacy A. Wright, Jr.	United States Ambassador to Jamaica; November 4, 1994 – November 27, 1997	Succeeded by Stanley Louis McLelland
