= Donald Tapia =

American businessman and diplomat (born 1938)

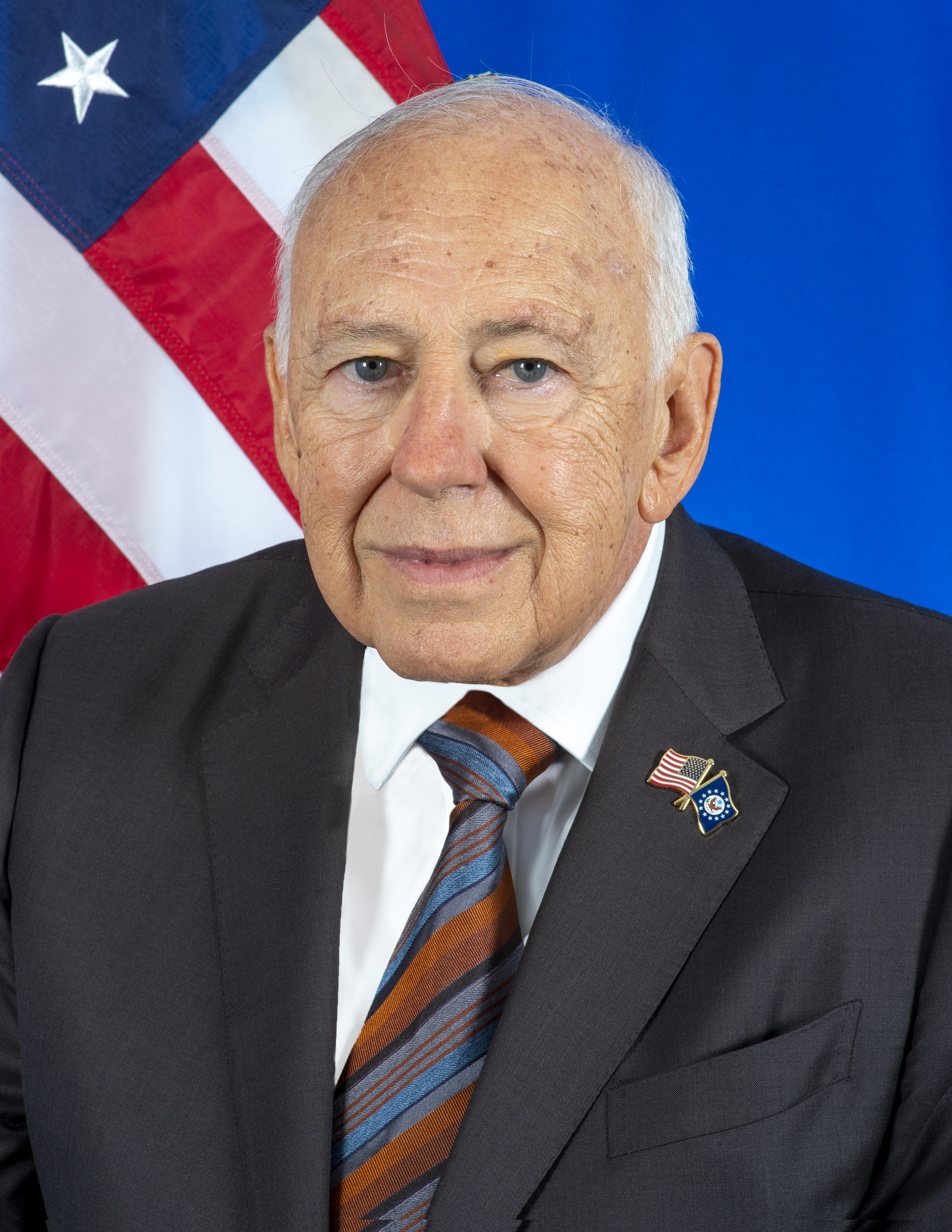

United States Ambassador to Jamaica
- In office September 11, 2019 – January 20, 2021
- President: Donald Trump
- Preceded by: Luis G. Moreno
- Succeeded by: N. Nick Perry

Personal details
- Born: Donald Ray Tapia; January 12, 1938 (age 88) Detroit, Michigan, U.S.
- Party: Republican
- Children: 2
- Education: Saint Leo University (BA, MBA)

Military service
- Allegiance: United States
- Branch/service: United States Air Force
- Years of service: 1955–1959

Donald Ray Tapia (born January 12, 1938) is an American businessman who was the United States Ambassador to Jamaica from 2019 until 2021.

== Early life ==
Tapia was born on January 12, 1938, in Detroit, Michigan. He was raised in poverty primarily by his mother after his father left the family. After graduating from high school, Tapia joined the United States Air Forces and served from 1955 to 1959.

== Career ==
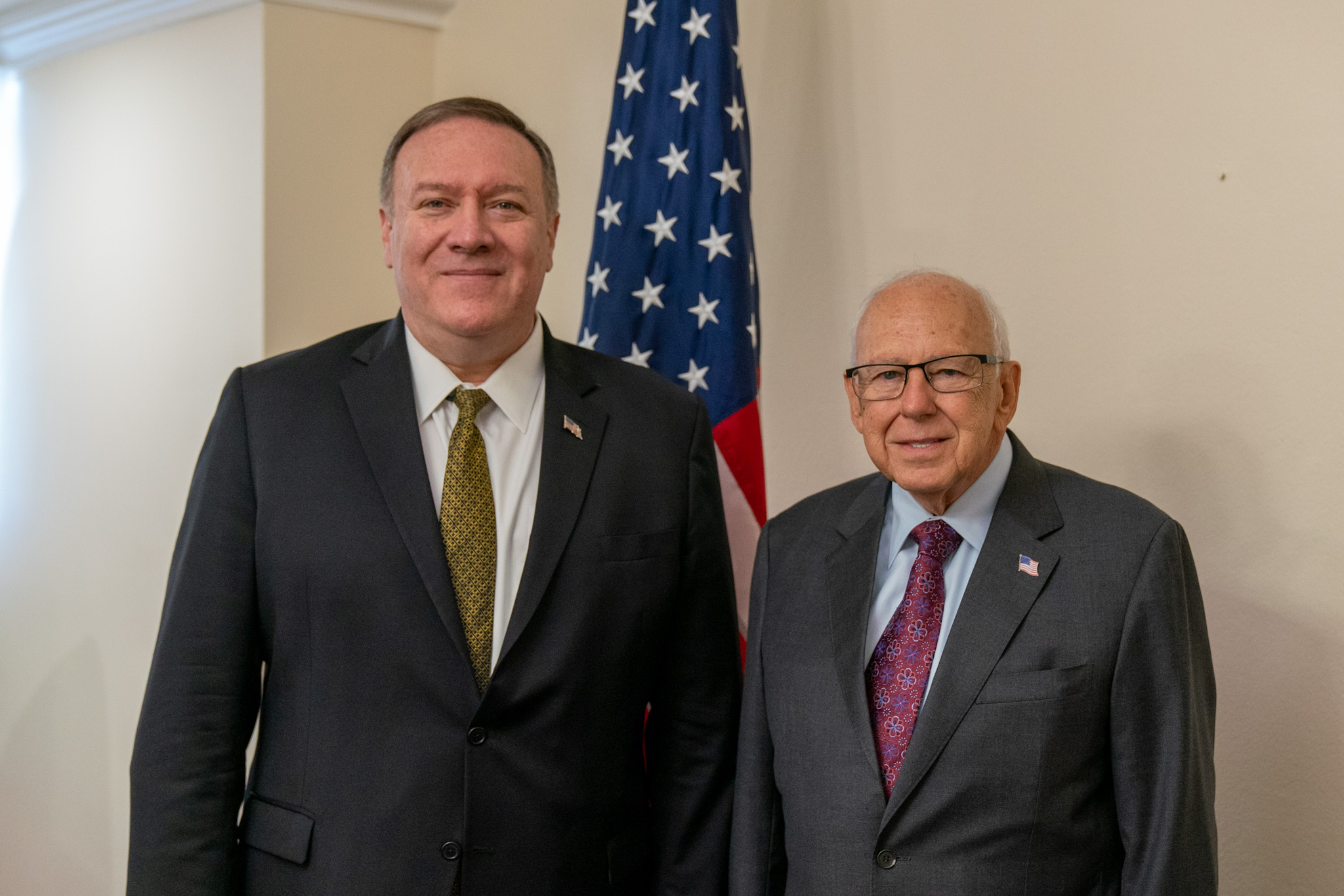
Tapia meets with Secretary of State Michael R. Pompeo in Kingston, Jamaica on January 22, 2020.

=== Political Campaign ===
Tapia ran as an Independent for Mohave County Supervisor in 1980, while a resident of Lake Havasu City, Arizona. He lost in the general election to incumbent Republican supervisor Jerry Holt by a wide margin.

=== Business career and philanthropy ===
Tapia was chairman and CEO of the Essco Group Management, an electrical production company, for over 30 years. Tapia also was on the board of directors for the Sun Angel Foundation and Endowment at Arizona State University, the Tau Kappa Epsilon Educational Foundation the Board of Indianapolis, and as chairman of board and trustee at Saint Leo University.

=== U.S. Ambassador to Jamaica ===
U.S. President Donald Trump nominated Tapia as United States Ambassador to Jamaica, succeeding Luis Moreno.

Diplomatic posts
Preceded by Luis G. Moreno	United States Ambassador to Jamaica; 2019–2021	Succeeded by John McIntyre; Chargé d’Affaires
