= Ruth Chew =

American author and illustrator

- Born: April 8, 1920; Minneapolis, Minnesota, US
- Died: May 13, 2010 (aged 90); Castro Valley, California, US
- Other name: Ruth Silver
- Education: Western High School (1936)
- Occupations: children's author, illustrator
- Known for: The Wednesday Witch
- Spouse: Aaron B. Z. Silver

Ruth Chew (April 8, 1920 – May 13, 2010) was an American children's author and illustrator of over 30 children's books, most of which were juvenile fantasy. The books were early-reader chapter books and usually centered on magic. Most were published in the 1970s and 1980s by Scholastic Corporation and have been out of print for some time. However, her works are gradually being republished by Random House as of 2013.

Chew was born in Minneapolis, Minnesota, on April 8, 1920, and attended the Corcoran School of Art. She later moved to Manhattan to pursue a career as a fashion artist and moved to Brooklyn in 1948. In 1953, she moved into the Brooklyn row house where many of her books are set. She died May 13, 2010, in Castro Valley, California.

== Bibliography ==
- The Wednesday Witch (1969) ISBN 0-590-42761-X
- Baked Beans for Breakfast (1970) ASIN B000KOXKT4 (a.k.a. The Secret Summer, ASIN B000MFPE86)
- No Such Thing as a Witch (1971) ISBN 0-590-44053-5
- Magic in the Park (1972) ISBN 0-590-40119-X
- The Hidden Cave (1973) ISBN 0-590-06105-4 (a.k.a. The Magic Cave, ISBN 0-8038-4711-4)
- What the Witch Left (1973) ISBN 0-8038-8065-0
- The Secret Tree-House (1974) ASIN B000HIN5TI
- The Witch's Buttons (1974) ISBN 0-8038-8071-5
- Witch in the House (1975) ISBN 0-590-00093-4
- The Trouble with Magic (1976) ISBN 0-396-07364-6
- The Would-Be Witch (1976) ISBN 0-8038-8084-7
- Summer Magic (1977) ISBN 0-590-10421-7
- Witch's Broom (1977) ISBN 0-396-07486-3
- The Witch's Garden (1978) ISBN 0-8038-8093-6
- Earthstar Magic (1979) ISBN 0-8038-1955-2
- The Wishing Tree (1980) ISBN 0-8038-8099-5
- Second-hand Magic (1981) ISBN 0-8234-0430-7 (a.k.a. Secondhand Magic, ISBN 0-8234-0430-7)
- Mostly Magic (1982) ISBN 0-590-40654-X
- The Magic Coin (1983) ISBN 0-590-32640-6
- The Witch at the Window (1984) ISBN 0-590-41219-1
- Trapped in Time (1986) ISBN 0-590-33813-7
- Do-It-Yourself Magic (1987) ISBN 0-590-40784-8
- The Witch and the Ring (1989) ISBN 0-590-42056-9
- Magic of the Black Mirror (1990) ISBN 0-590-43186-2
- Royal Magic (1991) ISBN 0-590-44742-4
- Wrong Way Around Magic (1993) ISBN 0-590-46023-4
- Witch's Cat (1994) ISBN 0-590-48341-2
- Last Chance for Magic (1996) ISBN 0-590-60210-1
- The Enchanted Book (1998) ISBN 0-590-09874-8

Ruth Chew also illustrated children's books by other authors, including The Questers, by E. W. Hildick, and Shark Lady: True Adventures of Eugenie Clark, by Ann McGovern.
