= Stanley Louis McLelland =

American businessman

Stanley Louis McLelland (1945-2020) was an American businessman and diplomat from San Antonio, Texas. He became a director of Nustar GP LLC in October 2005. He had also served as director of Nustar GP Holdings since July 2006 and as a director of two privately held companies since November 2003 and June 2004, respectively. He was a senior executive with Valero Energy, he also served as executive vice president and general counsel from 1990 to 1997.

He served as U.S. Ambassador to Jamaica from 1998 through 2001.

Since 2001 he was retired and lived in Austin, Texas. He died on November 11, 2020.

Diplomatic posts
Preceded by J. Gary Cooper	United States Ambassador to Jamaica; 1997–2001	Succeeded by Sue M. Cobb
