= Nick Perry (politician) =

American politician (born 1950)

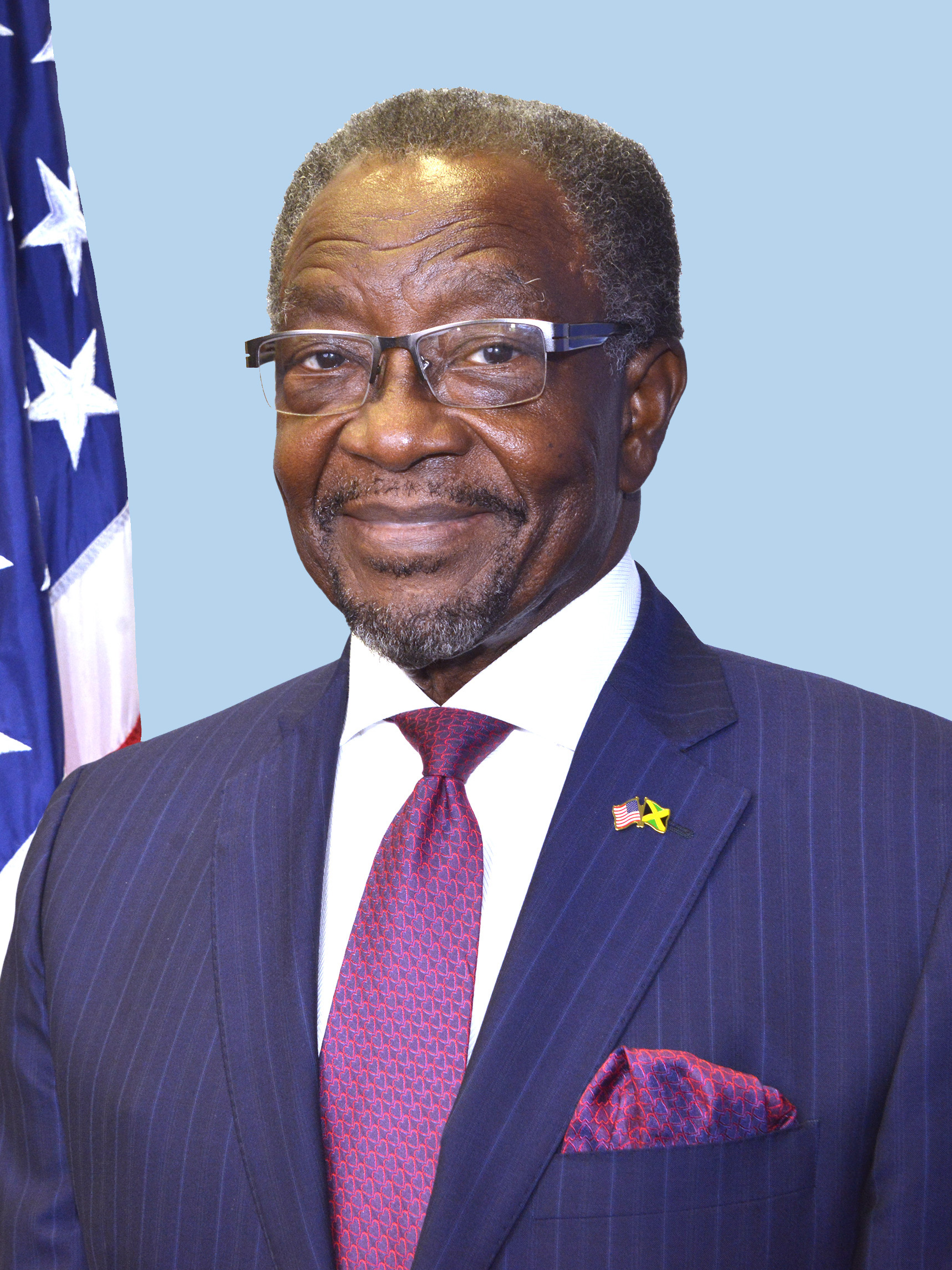
- Official portrait, 2022

United States Ambassador to Jamaica
- In office May 13, 2022 – January 20, 2025
- President: Joe Biden
- Preceded by: Donald Tapia
- Succeeded by: Amy Tachco (acting)

Member of the New York State Assembly from the 58th district
- In office January 3, 1993 – March 30, 2022
- Preceded by: Elizabeth Connelly
- Succeeded by: Monique Chandler-Waterman

Personal details
- Born: Noah Nickolas Perry; August 1, 1950 (age 76) Saint Andrew Parish, Colony of Jamaica
- Party: Democratic
- Spouse: Joyce Perry
- Children: 2
- Relatives: Justine Skye (granddaughter)
- Education: Brooklyn College (BA, MA)
- Profession: Politician

Military service
- Allegiance: United States
- Branch/service: United States Army
- Years of service: 1972–1978

Noah Nickolas Perry (born August 1, 1950) is an American politician and diplomat who had served as the United States ambassador to Jamaica from 2022 to 2025. He served as a member of the New York State Assembly for the 58th district from 1993 to 2022. His former district included the neighborhood of East Flatbush, as well as portions of Canarsie and Brownsville, among other neighborhoods located in the borough of Brooklyn.

== Early life and education ==
Born and raised in Saint Andrew Parish, Jamaica, Noah Nickolas Perry graduated from Kingston College in Kingston, Jamaica. Perry graduated from Brooklyn College with a Bachelor of Arts degree in political science. He later returned to Brooklyn College to study for a Master of Arts in public policy and administration.

== Career ==
Perry worked at the Bustamante Industrial Trade Union before immigrating to the United States in 1971. The following year he volunteered for the United States Army, from which he was honorably discharged at the rank of Specialist Five in 1978 after having served as an active-duty serviceman for two years and inactive reserve for four years.

=== Politics ===
In 1983, Perry was appointed as a member of Brooklyn Community Board 17. He later served as chairman of that board and the following year he ran as a candidate for District Leader in the 42nd Assembly District. He would later serve as a member of the Executive Board of the 67th Police Precinct and as a director of Flatbush East Community Development Corporation.

In 1992, following the 1990 Census, a new assembly district was added in Brooklyn, located in East Flatbush. Perry won new 58th district seat in the November 1992 election.

Since 2001, Perry has been the vice-chair of the Assembly Majority Conference and majority whip. He also serves on the New York State Assembly Committees on Ways & Means, Rules, Codes, Labor, Transportation and Banks.

In 2006, Perry declared his candidacy for New York's 11th congressional district, which was being vacated by retiring Congressman Major Owens. In May 2006, he withdrew from the congressional race and endorsed eventual leader Yvette Clarke.

Perry ran uncontested in his 2008, 2010 and 2012 general elections for State Assembly.

=== Biden administration ===
In November 2021, Perry was nominated to serve as United States ambassador to Jamaica. Hearings on his nomination were held before the Senate's Foreign Relations Committee on February 8, 2022. On March 8, 2022, the committee favorably reported Perry's nomination to the Senate floor. Perry was confirmed by the entire Senate on March 10, 2022, via voice vote. On May 13, 2022, he presented his credentials to Governor-General of Jamaica Sir Patrick Allen.

=== New York State Athletic Commission ===
In 2025, Perry was appointed chair of the New York State Athletic Commission by Governor Kathy Hochul.

== Personal life ==
Perry and his wife Joyce reside in the East Flatbush neighborhood of Brooklyn. Perry's granddaughter is Justine Skye, a Roc Nation recording artist.

New York State Assembly
Preceded by Elizabeth Connelly	New York State Assembly, 58th District; 1993–2022	Succeeded by Monique Chandler-Waterman
Diplomatic posts
Preceded by Donald Tapia	United States Ambassador to Jamaica; 2022–2025	Vacant
