= Lloyd Henry =

American politician

Member of the New York City Council from the 45th district
- In office January 1, 1994 – December 31, 2001
- Preceded by: Susan Alter
- Succeeded by: Kendall Stewart

Personal details
- Born: Belize
- Political party: Democratic

Lloyd Henry is an American politician who served in the New York City Council from the 45th district from 1994 to 2001.
