= Workshops for Careers in the Arts =

Workshops for Careers in the Arts was a professional training program especially designed for artistically talented teenagers which took place on the campus of The George Washington University in a joint collaboration. Designated a pilot program, Workshops for Careers in the Arts was created in June 1968 by Peggy Cooper Cafritz and Mike Malone as a means toward the establishment of a public high school for the arts in Washington, D.C.

There were three departments in the school program at the start of its formation. They were in Drama/Theatre, Dance, and Visual Arts/Painting. These departments serviced qualified area students after their normal home school day, on weekends during the academic year, and full time during the summer months. Roughly ninety (90) students were enrolled during the inaugural years. Funding eventually became increasingly available as lobbying, grants, enrollment, contributions, and the reputation of the program increased.

Students were accepted on the basis of recommendations from area Principals, Teachers, Parents, interviews, and auditions. Talented students who could not otherwise afford such training were given top priority. Workshops for Careers in the Arts enrolled and had diverse students from all over the Washington Metropolitan region. No student was required to pay a tuition.

Upon leaving the program, the students were encouraged to continue their career training. Workshops for Careers in the Arts students began to achieve collegiate full scholarships and receive contracts toward higher education. The George Washington University, The Washington School of Ballet, The North Carolina School of the Arts, The Juilliard School and Howard University were some of the first institutions to receive Workshops for Careers in the Arts graduates. Some graduates had opportunities to start professional careers in their field soon after their departure from the program.

Workshops for Careers in the Arts showed the need for and the results of specialized vocational training in the arts. As more successful Workshops for Careers in the Arts years past, which included the need for an additional space location on Georgia Avenue at Morton Street, N.W., the Washington community made this opportunity available to their young people on a much broader scale. In the process during 1974, the Duke Ellington High School at Western High School in Washington, D.C. was born. The goal was achieved.

Duke Ellington School of the Arts was established as an accredited four (4) year public high school curriculum, combining arts and academics in the Nation's Capital.
