= Brenda LaGrange Johnson =

American diplomat

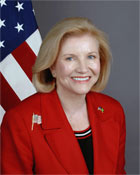

United States Ambassador to Jamaica
- In office November 15, 2005 – January 20, 2009
- President: George W. Bush
- Preceded by: Sue M. Cobb
- Succeeded by: Luis G. Moreno

Brenda LaGrange Johnson (born 1939) is an American businesswoman and diplomat who has served in numerous positions. Since 1977 she was a partner with BrenMer Industries, she is also on Duke University advisory board of the Nasher Museum of Art. She was a founding member of the Madison Square Boys and Girls Club as a trustee, she has been on both The Board of Trustees as well as the President's Advisory Council to the Arts the Kennedy Center. She was appointed ambassador to Jamaica in 2005 by George W. Bush in which position she served until 2009.
