= Great American Train Show =

The official GATS logo.

The Great American Train Show is the name of what was, for two decades, the largest traveling model train show in the United States. The company was incorporated in 1985 and went defunct in 2006. During the 1990s, the company operated as many as 90 train shows every year in 40 different states.

== Corporate history ==
The Great American Train Show, or GATS, was founded by David K. Swanson as an outgrowth of a monthly train show in Wheaton, Illinois, near Chicago that was itself an outgrowth of a local model railroad club. Beginning in 1982, Swanson began running train shows in cities outside the Chicago area, eventually expanding the operation to the west coast by the mid-1980s and to the east coast by the mid-1990s.

GATS was originally run as a subsidiary of the NIART company, but following incorporation as GATS Limited became itself a parent to a series of subsidiaries which existed at one point or another. These included:

- Great Midwest Train Show
- Great Western Train Show
- Great American Travel Service
- GA Technology Services
- Computer Renaissance (franchise)
- Computer Central

In 2001, the company was sold by Swanson to Elmo Geoghegan, a former Bob's Big Boy employee who had worked for GATS as a show manager. Geoghegan moved the emphasis of the company from train shows towards computer shows, a change which proved financially disastrous. In 2004, the company's name was changed to Great Western & Atlantic Train Show, and in April 2006 the company ceased all operations.

== Operations ==
One of the attractions used by GATS was this portable "trailer layout" designed to be hauled between show locations.

The core business of GATS consisted of running consumer shows focused on model railroading. These train shows consisted of several dozen vendors selling a variety of model railroad related merchandise, as well as several operating model train layouts. Shows were opened to the public over the course of two days, Saturday and Sunday. Public attendance could range from around 1,500 to as many as 10,000 attendees over the course of the two-day show. As show promoter, GATS performed facility and show operation personnel contracting, exhibitor registration, floor plan design, and on-site management functions, as well as conducting advertising and public relations campaigns to draw attendees.

== Successor Train Shows ==
After selling GATS, Swanson went on to purchase Greenberg Shows, an east coast train show company that had formerly been in competition with GATS. This operation was later folded into the Great Train Expo company, which was created by Swanson when GATS went defunct. Swanson also founded the World's Greatest Hobby on Tour, a model railroad industry trade and consumer show.
