= Susan Alter =

American politician

Member of the New York City Council
- In office January 1, 1978 – December 31, 1993
- Preceded by: Edward M. Rappaport
- Succeeded by: Lloyd Henry
- Constituency: 32nd district (1978–1982); 25th district (1983–1991); 45th district (1992–1993)

Personal details
- Born: May 18, 1942 (age 84)
- Party: Democratic

Susan Alter Klaperman (born May 18, 1942) is an American politician who served in the New York City Council from 1978 to 1993. She was the first, and as yet only, Orthodox Jewish woman to serve on the council.

In 1993, Alter supported Rudy Giuliani for mayor and claimed incumbent mayor David Dinkins was "ineffective", she was the Republican and Liberal nominee for the new office of New York City Public Advocate; she unsuccessfully ran in the Democratic primary as part of a strategy to form a cross-party Giuliani fusion ticket. She finished a distant third in the primary behind Mark Green and David Paterson and lost to Green in the general election by a wide margin.
