= Kent (Washington, D.C.) =

- Neighborhood of Washington, D.C.
- Map of Washington, D.C., with Kent highlighted in red
- Coordinates: 38.9337°N 77.1036°W
- Country: United States
- District: Washington, D.C.
- Ward: Ward 3

Government
  - Councilmember: Matthew Frumin
- Postal code: ZIP code

Kent is a neighborhood in Northwest Washington, D.C. It is a triangular section of land bounded by Loughboro Road NW to the north, MacArthur Boulevard NW to the southwest, and Chain Bridge Road NW and Battery Kemble Park to the southeast. It is a suburban neighborhood, home to some of the most expensive homes in the city with an average home sales price in 2012 of $1.7 million ($2.38 million today).

== Geography ==
This area was long considered to be part of the Palisades, the community that lies to the south, opposite MacArthur Boulevard. The neighborhood is bisected by Arizona Avenue NW which runs from southwest to northeast and divides it into two distinct areas. The hilly western section was developed in the 1930s and 1940s in a suburban style of that time with similar-looking Colonial Revival houses. The east developed more organically beginning before the Civil War and maintains a more rural character. The neighborhood is entirely residential with all commercial development located along MacArthur Boulevard.

== History ==
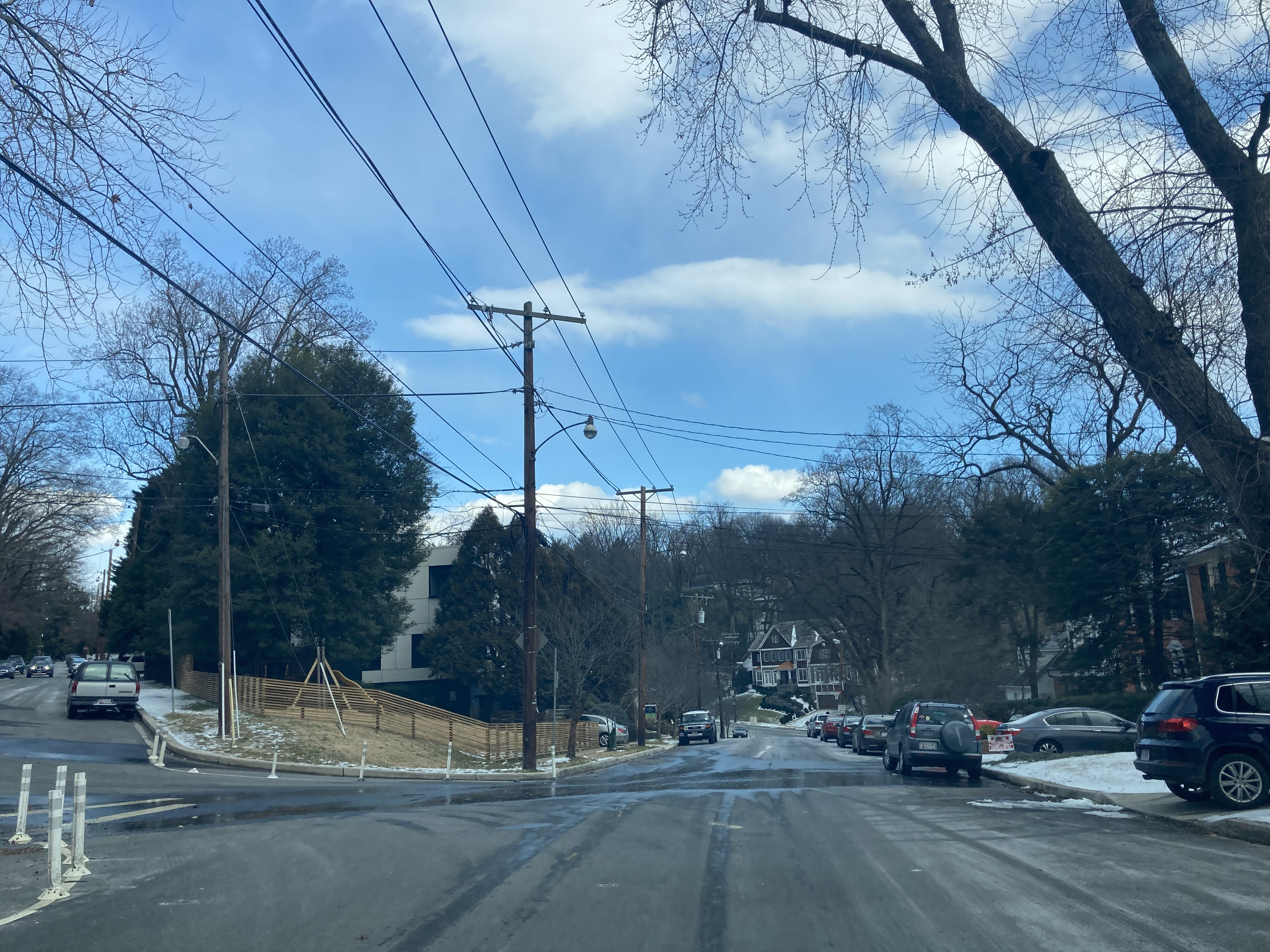
Intersection of Cathedral Ave. and Weaver Terrace NW in February 2021

The earliest habitation after the organization of the District of Columbia in 1801 was along the road to the Chain Bridge across the Potomac River (now Chain Bridge Road) which lies at what is now the neighborhood’s eastern border. The population grew during the Civil War, when settlements of freed and escaped slaves sprang up around Battery Kemble, one of the Civil War Defenses of Washington, located to the east of the road. After the war, Black people continued to settle in the area on land they were given or that they bought from other landowners. Remnants of this community include a small cemetery established in 1868 and an old schoolhouse.

When the lots in this eastern section were finally subdivided, they assumed irregular shapes that reflected the land’s contours and previous land divisions. Unlike many parts of Washington, this area did not have restrictive covenants barring habitation by Black people or Jews. Thus, the neighborhood became a haven for educated minorities, many of whom built houses designed by distinguished architects such as modernist Walter Gropius that were interspersed with 18th-century farmhouses and 19th-century bungalows.

== See also ==
- The Palisades (Washington, D.C.)
- D.C. Neighborhoods Map
