= List of ambassadors of the United States to Jamaica =

Ambassador of the United States to Jamaica
- Seal of the United States Department of State

- Flag of a United States ambassador

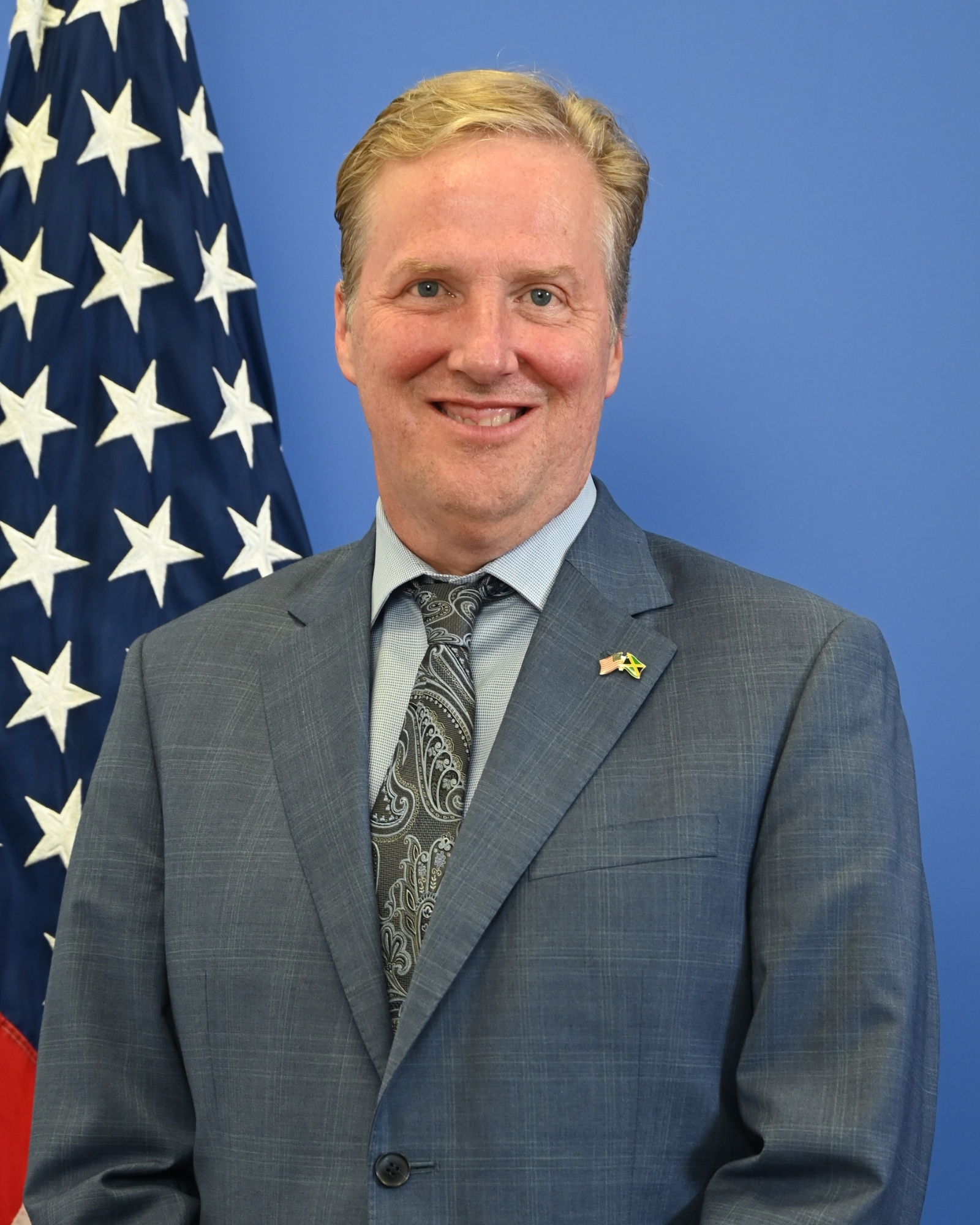
- Incumbent; Scott Renner; Chargé d'affaires since August 13, 2025
- Nominator: The president of the United States
- Appointer: The president; with Senate advice and consent
- Inaugural holder: Irving G. Cheslaw as Chargé d'Affaires ad interim
- Formation: August 16, 1962
- Website: U.S. Embassy - Kingston

This is a list of United States ambassadors to Jamaica. The U.S. Embassy is located in Jamaica's capital, Kingston, and was established there on August 16, 1962.

== Ambassadors ==
Name	Background	Title	Appointment	Presentation of credentials	Termination of mission	Notes
Irving G. Cheslaw	Non-career appointee	Chargé d'Affaires ad interim	August 16, 1962	Unknown	November 1962	
William C. Doherty	Non-career appointee	Ambassador Extraordinary and Plenipotentiary	October 23, 1962	November 26, 1962	Left post, April 25, 1964	
Wilson T. M. Beale Jr.	Foreign Service officer	Ambassador Extraordinary and Plenipotentiary	September 1, 1965	October 13, 1965	Left post, October 22, 1967	
Walter N. Tobriner	Non-career appointee	Ambassador Extraordinary and Plenipotentiary	November 7, 1967	December 11, 1967	Left post, March 21, 1969	
Vincent de Roulet	Non-career appointee	Ambassador Extraordinary and Plenipotentiary	September 19, 1969	October 23, 1969	Left post, July 18, 1973	
Sumner Gerard	Non-career appointee	Ambassador Extraordinary and Plenipotentiary	March 22, 1974	June 4, 1974	Left post, April 15, 1977	
Frederick Irving	Foreign Service officer	Ambassador Extraordinary and Plenipotentiary	May 26, 1977	July 18, 1977	Left post, November 22, 1978	
Loren E. Lawrence	Foreign Service officer	Ambassador Extraordinary and Plenipotentiary	March 23, 1979	April 12, 1979	Left post, July 9, 1982	
William Alexander Hewitt	Non-career appointee	Ambassador Extraordinary and Plenipotentiary	September 30, 1982	November 1, 1982	Left post, October 14, 1985	
Michael Sotirhos	Non-career appointee	Ambassador Extraordinary and Plenipotentiary	October 28, 1985	November 12, 1985	Left post, July 7, 1989	
Glen A. Holden	Non-career appointee	Ambassador Extraordinary and Plenipotentiary	October 10, 1989	November 21, 1989	Left post, March 1, 1993	
Lacy A. Wright, Jr.		Chargé d'Affaires ad interim	March 1, 1993		November 4, 1994	
J. Gary Cooper	Non-career appointee	Ambassador Extraordinary and Plenipotentiary	October 5, 1994	November 4, 1994	Left post, November 27, 1997	
Stanley Louis McLelland	Non-career appointee	Ambassador Extraordinary and Plenipotentiary	November 12, 1997	February 6, 1998	Left post March 1, 2001	
Sue McCourt Cobb	Non-career appointee	Ambassador Extraordinary and Plenipotentiary	January 20, 2001	September 12, 2001	February 1, 2005	
Brenda LaGrange Johnson	Non-career appointee	Ambassador Extraordinary and Plenipotentiary	October 12, 2005	November 15, 2005	January 20, 2009	
Pamela E. Bridgewater	Foreign Service officer	Ambassador Extraordinary and Plenipotentiary	August 9, 2010	November 3, 2010	November 25, 2013	
Luis G. Moreno	Foreign Service officer	Ambassador Extraordinary and Plenipotentiary	November 20, 2014	January 13, 2015	June 30, 2017	
Eric Khant	Foreign Service officer	Chargé d'Affaires ad interim	June 30, 2017		July 16, 2019	
Donald R. Tapia	Non-career appointee	Ambassador Extraordinary and Plenipotentiary	July 24, 2019	September 11, 2019	January 20, 2021	
John McIntyre	Foreign Service officer	Chargé d'Affaires ad interim	January 20, 2021		May 13, 2022	
N. Nick Perry	Non-career appointee	Ambassador Extraordinary and Plenipotentiary	March 10, 2022	May 13, 2022	January 20, 2025	
Amy Tachco	Foreign Service officer	Chargé d'Affaires ad interim	January 20, 2025		August 12, 2025	
Scott Renner	Foreign Service officer	Chargé d'Affaires ad interim	August 13, 2025		Incumbent	

== See also ==
- Jamaica – United States relations
- Foreign relations of Jamaica
- Ambassadors of the United States
