= Mendy Pellin =

American comedian (born 1982)

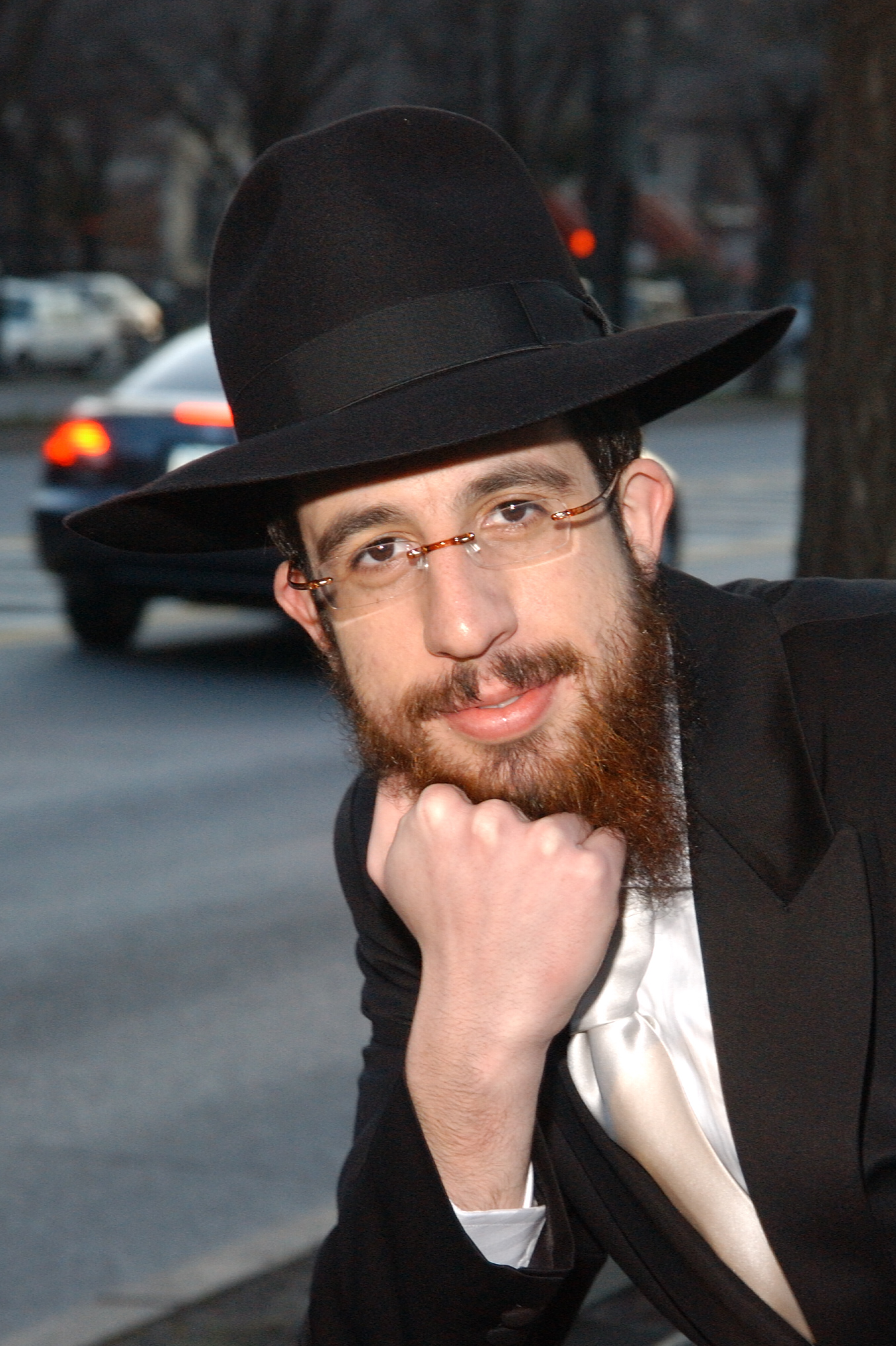
- Pellin in 2007
- Born: 1982 (age 43); Denver, Colorado, U.S.
- Occupation: Comedian

Mendy Pellin (born 1982) is an American comedian.

Pellin was born to a Chabad Hasidic family in Denver, Colorado, and grew up in the Crown Heights neighborhood of Brooklyn, New York City. He and his wife, Shulamit, married at the end of March 2007, and shortly afterwards moved to Los Angeles, California. He is an ordained rabbi.

Pellin has a satirical news show, The Mendy Report, which is loosely based on The Daily Show. He is a co-writer for a sitcom (release date unknown). He has appeared on The Tonight Show with Jay Leno and acted in the films Moneyball and A Modest Suggestion. In November 2006, he launched ChabadTube.com, an online newscast and web channel.
