= Adina Sash =

American activist and influencer

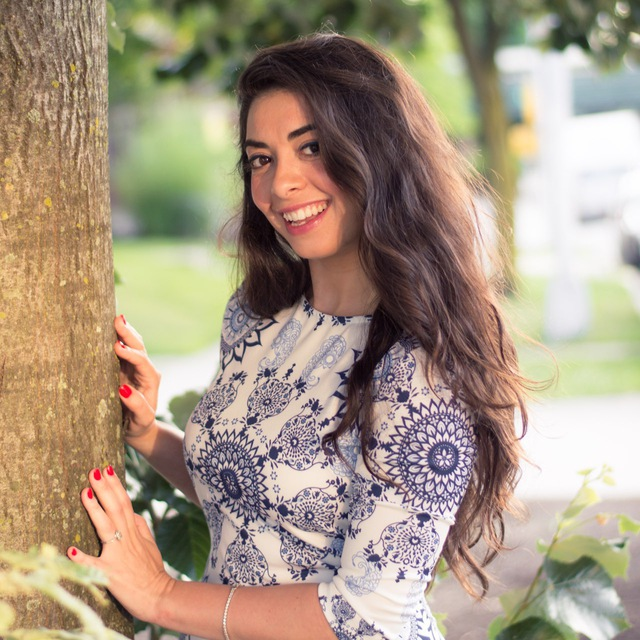
- Born: Brooklyn, New York
- Occupation: Activist

Adina Miles Sash (born Esther Adina Miles, also known as "FlatbushGirl") is an American Jewish activist and social media influencer, based out of Brooklyn, New York. Sash gained notability within Orthodox Judaism for her stage character (FlatbushGirl) on her Instagram. Originally her content focused on the everyday lives of Orthodox Jewish women with comedic sketches and videos. In recent years, her activism has been primarily focused on issues relating to Aggunot.

== Early life and education ==
Sash was born and raised in Brooklyn, New York. As a young child, Sash began to question many of the rules taught to her in her Jewish day school. She holds a degree in Medieval Literature from Brooklyn College. According to Sash, her online activism began after having received misogynistic comments, from Orthodox Jews, during an attempt to start a marketing business. Her mother Rona Miles, who teaches psychology at Brooklyn college, has publicly supported (in 2020) her daughter's activism. According to her Instagram account, Sash is married and the mother of two sons.

== Career ==
=== Early Activism ===
In 2017, Sash launched a social media campaign #FrumWomenHaveFaces that gained traction on social media in order to raise awareness of some Orthodox newspapers and magazines not publishing photos of women. Her campaign was covered in various local media outlets including the NY Daily News and received the support of several well known Jewish figures. Sash's campaign tactics included purchasing a full-page ad in the Flatbush Jewish Journal thanking city councilman Chaim Deutsch for his service to the Jewish community, and when informed the paper would not allow her face to be shown or the word "girl" to be used in the title, Sash modified the ad so that an emoji covered her face and her moniker was changed from 'Flatbush Girl' to 'Flatbush Boy'.

=== Reception within the Orthodox community ===
Sash's reception within the Orthodox community has at times been mixed and controversial. Backlash to Sash's activism, centering on Orthodox norms of women's modesty, has received some local media coverage in the past. However, several Liberal Orthodox women's advocacy groups, including the Jewish Orthodox Feminist Alliance (JOFA) and Chochmat Nashim, have previously supported Sash's activism.

In the winter of 2023, Sash held an Instagram Live discussion with her followers when one of her friends named Riki Rose said she had an important question and was prompted to share her screen. However, the image that appeared on the screen was that of a man with exposed genitals. The incident led to Sash losing several thousand followers, while some accused her husband of being the offender.

In the fall of 2024, Sash staged a "sex-strike" in support of another woman in her community awaiting a Get. The strike lasted for approximately 6 months. Some Jewish leaders and rabbis, including Hershel Schachter condemned Sash for this action and referred to her behavior as "destructive".

=== Politics ===
In 2018, Sash ran for a district leader position in the 45th New York State Assembly District. In 2019, Sash again ran for public office, this time to replace the vacated seat of New York City Councilman Jumaane Williams, but finished with only 696 votes after all absentee ballots were counted.
