= Presidency of Dwight D. Eisenhower =

U.S. presidential administration from 1953 to 1961

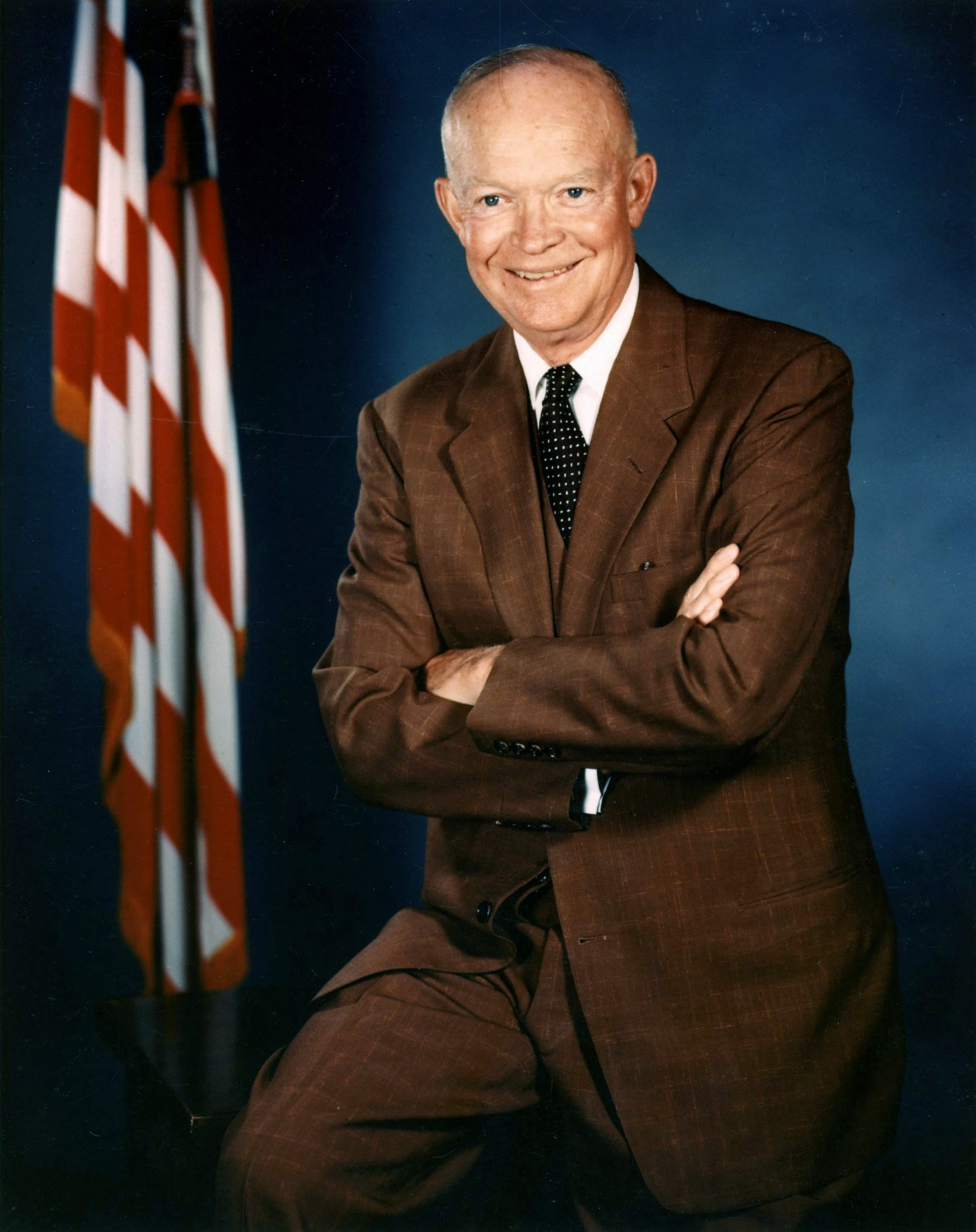
- Official portrait, 1956
- Presidency of Dwight D. Eisenhower; January 20, 1953 – January 20, 1961
- Vice President: Richard Nixon
- Cabinet: See list
- Party: Republican
- Election: 1952; 1956
- Seat: White House
- Seal of the president (since 1960)

Dwight D. Eisenhower's tenure as the 34th president of the United States began with his first inauguration on January 20, 1953, and ended on January 20, 1961. Eisenhower, a Republican from Kansas, took office following his landslide victory over Democratic nominee Adlai Stevenson in the 1952 presidential election. Four years later, in the 1956 presidential election, he defeated Stevenson again, to win re-election in a larger landslide. Eisenhower was constitutionally limited to two terms (the first re-elected President to be so) and was succeeded by Democrat John F. Kennedy, who won the 1960 presidential election.

Eisenhower held office during the Cold War, a period of geopolitical tension between the United States and the Soviet Union. Eisenhower's New Look policy stressed the importance of nuclear weapons as a deterrent to military threats, and the United States built up a stockpile of nuclear weapons and nuclear weapons delivery systems during Eisenhower's presidency. Soon after taking office, Eisenhower negotiated an end to the Korean War, resulting in the partition of Korea. Following the Suez Crisis, Eisenhower promulgated the Eisenhower Doctrine, strengthening U.S. commitments in the Middle East. In response to the Cuban Revolution, the Eisenhower administration broke ties with Cuba and began preparations for an invasion of Cuba by Cuban exiles, eventually resulting in the failed Bay of Pigs Invasion. Eisenhower also allowed the Central Intelligence Agency to engage in covert actions, such as the 1953 Iranian coup d'état and the 1954 Guatemalan coup d'état.

In domestic affairs, Eisenhower supported a policy of modern Republicanism that occupied a middle ground between liberal Democrats and the conservative wing of the Republican Party. Eisenhower preserved New Deal programs and expanded Social Security eligibility to millions of Americans, while prioritizing a balanced budget over tax cuts and most domestic spending and presiding over an increase in military spending after the Korean War. He played a major role in establishing the Interstate Highway System by signing the Federal-Aid Highway Act of 1956, a massive infrastructure project consisting of tens of thousands of miles of divided highways, and was one of the most expensive megaprojects ever costing approximately $114 billion (equivalent to $652 billion in 2025). After the launch of Sputnik 1, Eisenhower signed the National Defense Education Act and presided over the creation of NASA. Eisenhower signed the first significant civil rights bill since the end of Reconstruction and although he did not fully embrace the Supreme Court's landmark desegregation ruling in the 1954 case of Brown v. Board of Education, he did enforce the Court's ruling.

Eisenhower maintained positive approval ratings throughout his tenure, but the launch of Sputnik 1 and a poor economy contributed to Republican losses in the 1958 elections. His preferred successor, Vice President Richard Nixon, won the Republican nomination but was narrowly defeated by John F. Kennedy in the 1960 presidential election. Eisenhower left office popular with the public. Eisenhower is generally ranked among the 10 greatest presidents.

== 1952 election ==
=== Republican nomination ===
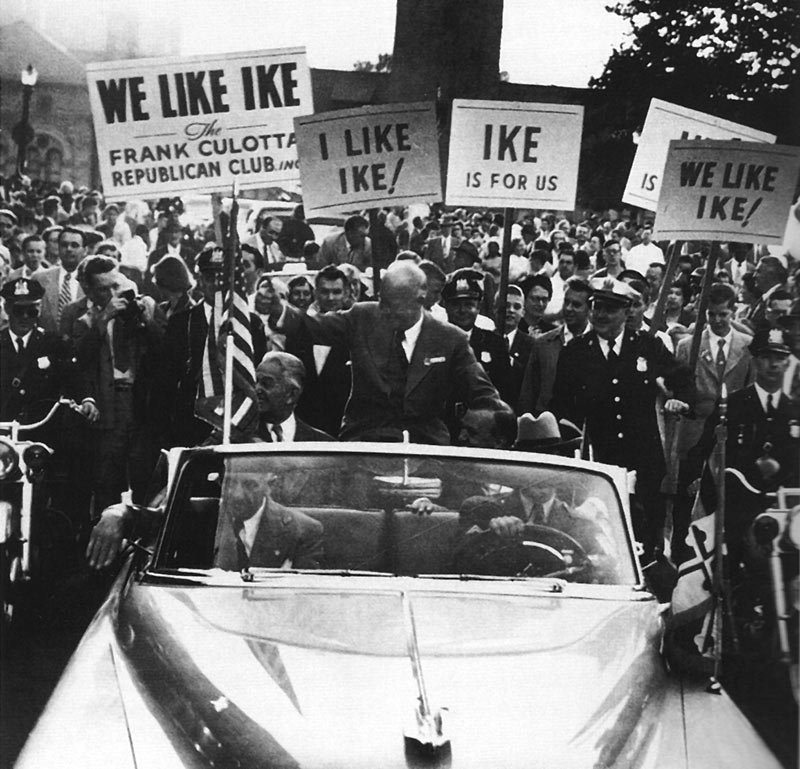
Eisenhower presidential campaign, Baltimore, Maryland c. September 1952

Going into the 1952 Republican presidential primaries, the two major contenders for the Republican presidential nomination were General Dwight D. Eisenhower and Senator Robert A. Taft of Ohio. Governor Earl Warren of California and former governor Harold Stassen of Minnesota also sought the nomination. Taft led the conservative wing of the party, which rejected many of the New Deal social welfare programs created in the 1930s and supported a noninterventionist foreign policy. Taft had been a candidate for the Republican nomination twice before but had been defeated both times by moderate Republicans from New York: Wendell Willkie in 1940 and Thomas E. Dewey in 1948.

Dewey, the party's presidential nominee in 1944 and 1948, led the moderate wing of the party, centered in the Eastern states. These moderates supported most of the New Deal and tended to be interventionists in the Cold War. Dewey himself declined to run for president a third time, but he and other moderates sought to use his influence to ensure that 1952 Republican ticket hewed closer to their wing of the party. To this end, they assembled a Draft Eisenhower movement in September 1951. Two weeks later, at the National Governors' Conference meeting, seven Republican governors endorsed his candidacy. Eisenhower, then serving as the supreme allied commander of NATO, had long been mentioned as a possible presidential contender, but he was reluctant to become involved in partisan politics. Nonetheless, he was troubled by Taft's non-interventionist views, especially his opposition to NATO, which Eisenhower considered to be an important deterrence against Soviet aggression. He was also motivated by the corruption that he believed had crept into the federal government during the later years of the Truman administration.

Eisenhower suggested in late 1951 that he would not oppose any effort to nominate him for president, although he still refused to seek the nomination actively. In January 1952, Senator Henry Cabot Lodge Jr. announced that Eisenhower's name would be entered in the March New Hampshire primary, even though he had not yet officially entered the race. The result in New Hampshire was a solid Eisenhower victory with 46,661 votes to 35,838 for Taft and 6,574 for Stassen. In April, Eisenhower resigned from his NATO command and returned to the United States. The Taft forces put up a strong fight in the remaining primaries, and, by the time of the July 1952 Republican National Convention, it was still unclear whether Taft or Eisenhower would win the presidential nomination.

When the 1952 Republican National Convention opened in Chicago, Eisenhower's managers accused Taft of "stealing" delegate votes in Southern states, claiming that Taft's allies had unfairly denied delegate spots to Eisenhower supporters and put Taft delegates in their place. Lodge and Dewey proposed to evict the pro-Taft delegates in these states and replace them with pro-Eisenhower delegates; they called this proposal "Fair Play". Although Taft and his supporters angrily denied this charge, the convention voted to support Fair Play 658 to 548, and Taft lost many Southern delegates. Eisenhower also received two more boosts: first when several uncommitted state delegations, such as Michigan and Pennsylvania, decided to support him; and second, when Stassen released his delegates and asked them to support Eisenhower. The removal of many pro-Taft Southern delegates and the support of the uncommitted states decided the nomination in Eisenhower's favor, which he won on the first ballot. Afterward, Senator Richard Nixon of California was nominated by acclamation as his vice-presidential running mate. Nixon, whose name came to the forefront early and often in preconvention conversations among Eisenhower's campaign managers, was selected because of his youth (39 years old) and solid anti-communist record.

=== General election ===
1952 Electoral College vote results

Incumbent president Harry S. Truman fared poorly in the polls and decided to not run in 1952. There was no clear frontrunner for the Democratic presidential nomination. Delegates to the 1952 Democratic National Convention in Chicago, nominated Illinois governor Adlai E. Stevenson for president on the third ballot. Senator John Sparkman of Alabama was selected as his running mate. The convention ended with widespread confidence that the party had selected a powerful presidential contender who would field a competitive campaign. Stevenson concentrated on giving a series of thoughtful speeches around the nation. Although his style thrilled intellectuals and academics, some political experts wondered if he were speaking "over the heads" of most of his listeners, and they dubbed him an "egghead", based on his baldness and intellectual demeanor. His biggest liability however, was Truman's unpopularity. Even though Stevenson had not been a part of the Truman administration, voters largely ignored his record and burdened him with Truman's. Historian Herbert Parmet said that Stevenson:

failed to dispel the widespread recognition that, for a divided America, torn by paranoia and unable to understand what had disrupted the anticipated tranquility of the postwar world, the time for change had really arrived. Neither Stevenson nor anyone else could have dissuaded the electorate from its desire to repudiate 'Trumanism.'

Republican strategy during the fall campaign focused on Eisenhower's unrivaled popularity. Ike traveled to 45 of the 48 states; his heroic image and plain talk excited the large crowds who heard him speak from the campaign train's rear platform. In his speeches, Eisenhower never mentioned Stevenson by name, instead relentlessly attacking the alleged failures of the Truman administration: "Korea, Communism, and corruption." In addition to the speeches, he got his message out to voters through 30-second television advertisements; this was the first presidential election in which television played a major role. In domestic policy, Eisenhower attacked the growing influence of the federal government in the economy, while in foreign affairs, he supported a strong American role in stemming the expansion of Communism. Eisenhower adopted much of the rhetoric and positions of the contemporary GOP, and many of his public statements were designed to win over conservative supporters of Taft.

A potentially devastating allegation hit when Nixon was accused by several newspapers of receiving $18,000 in undeclared "gifts" from wealthy California donors. Eisenhower and his aides considered dropping Nixon from the ticket and picking another running mate. Nixon responded to the allegations in a nationally televised speech, the "Checkers speech", on September 23. In this speech, Nixon denied the charges against him, gave a detailed account of his modest financial assets, and offered a glowing assessment of Eisenhower's candidacy. The highlight of the speech came when Nixon stated that a supporter had given his daughters a gift—a dog named "Checkers"—and that he would not return it, because his daughters loved it. The public responded to the speech with an outpouring of support, and Eisenhower retained him on the ticket.

Ultimately, the burden of the ongoing Korean War, Communist threat, and Truman administration scandals, as well as the popularity of Eisenhower, were too much for Stevenson to overcome. Eisenhower won a landslide victory, getting 55.2 percent of the popular vote and 442 electoral votes. Stevenson received 44.5 percent of the popular vote and 89 electoral votes. Eisenhower won every state outside of the South, as well as Virginia, Florida, and Texas, each of which voted Republican for just the second time since the end of Reconstruction. In the concurrent congressional elections, Republicans won control of the House of Representatives and the Senate.

== Administration ==
Eisenhower entered the White House with a strong background in organizing complex operations (such as the invasion of Europe in 1944). More than any previous president he paid attention to improving staff performance and defining duties. He paid special attention to having a powerful Chief of Staff in Sherman Adams, a former governor.

=== Cabinet ===
Eisenhower cabinet
Office	Name	Term
President	Dwight D. Eisenhower	1953–1961
Vice President	Richard Nixon	1953–1961
Secretary of State	John Foster Dulles	1953–1959
Christian Herter	1959–1961
Secretary of the Treasury	George M. Humphrey	1953–1957
Robert B. Anderson	1957–1961
Secretary of Defense	Charles Erwin Wilson	1953–1957
Neil H. McElroy	1957–1959
Thomas S. Gates Jr.	1959–1961
Attorney General	Herbert Brownell Jr.	1953–1957
William P. Rogers	1957–1961
Postmaster General	Arthur Summerfield	1953–1961
Secretary of the Interior	Douglas McKay	1953–1956
Fred A. Seaton	1956–1961
Secretary of Agriculture	Ezra Taft Benson	1953–1961
Secretary of Commerce	Sinclair Weeks	1953–1958
Frederick H. Mueller	1959–1961
Secretary of Labor	Martin Patrick Durkin	1953
James P. Mitchell	1953–1961
Secretary of Health, Education, and Welfare	Oveta Culp Hobby	1953–1955
Marion B. Folsom	1955–1958
Arthur Flemming	1958–1961
Director of the Bureau of the Budget	Joseph Dodge	1953–1954
Rowland Hughes	1954–1956
Percival Brundage	1956–1958
Maurice Stans	1958–1961
Ambassador to the United Nations	Henry Cabot Lodge Jr.	1953–1960
James Jeremiah Wadsworth	1960–1961
Director of the Mutual Security Agency	Harold Stassen	1953
Director of the Office of Defense Mobilization	Arthur Flemming	1953–1957
Gordon Gray	1957–1958
Administrator of the Federal; Civil Defense Administration	Val Peterson	1953–1957
Leo Hoegh	1957–1958
Director of the Office of Civil and Defense Mobilization	Leo Hoegh	1958–1961
Chair of the Atomic Energy Commission	Gordon Dean	1953
Lewis Strauss	1953–1958
John A. McCone	1958–1961
White House Chief of Staff	Sherman Adams	1953–1958
Wilton Persons	1958–1961
White House Deputy; Chief of Staff	Wilton Persons	1953–1958
Gerald D. Morgan	1958–1961
White House Cabinet Secretary	Maxwell M. Rabb	1953–1958
Robert Keith Gray	1958–1961

Eisenhower delegated the selection of his cabinet to two close associates, Lucius D. Clay and Herbert Brownell Jr. Brownell, a legal aide to Dewey, became attorney general. The office of Secretary of State went to John Foster Dulles, a long-time Republican spokesman on foreign policy who had helped design the United Nations Charter and the Treaty of San Francisco. Dulles would travel nearly 560,000 miles (901,233 km) during his six years in office. Outside of the cabinet, Eisenhower selected Sherman Adams as White House chief of staff, and Milton S. Eisenhower, the president's brother and a prominent college administrator, emerged as an important adviser. Eisenhower also elevated the role of the National Security Council, and designated Robert Cutler to serve as the first national security advisor.

Eisenhower sought out leaders of big business for many of his other cabinet appointments. Charles Erwin Wilson, the CEO of General Motors, was Eisenhower's first secretary of defense. In 1957, he was replaced by president of Procter & Gamble, Neil H. McElroy. For the position of secretary of the treasury, Ike selected George M. Humphrey, the CEO of several steel and coal companies. His postmaster general, Arthur E. Summerfield, and first secretary of the interior, Douglas McKay, were both automobile distributors. Former senator Sinclair Weeks became Secretary of Commerce. Eisenhower appointed Joseph Dodge, a longtime bank president who also had extensive government experience, as the director of the Bureau of the Budget. He became the first budget director to be given cabinet-level status.

Other Eisenhower cabinet selections provided patronage to political bases. Ezra Taft Benson, a high-ranking member of the Church of Jesus Christ of Latter-day Saints, was chosen as secretary of agriculture; he was the only person appointed from the Taft wing of the party. As the first secretary of the new Department of Health, Education, and Welfare (HEW), Eisenhower named the wartime head of the Army's Women's Army Corps, Oveta Culp Hobby. She was the second woman to ever be a cabinet member. Martin Patrick Durkin, a Democrat and president of the plumbers and steamfitters union, was selected as secretary of labor. As a result, it became a standing joke that Eisenhower's inaugural Cabinet was composed of "nine millionaires and a plumber." Dissatisfied with Eisenhower's labor policies, Durkin resigned after less than a year in office, and was replaced by James P. Mitchell.

Eisenhower suffered a major political defeat when his nomination of Lewis Strauss as a later Secretary of Commerce was defeated in the U.S. Senate in June 1959, in part due to Strauss's role in the Oppenheimer security hearing.

=== Vice presidency ===
Eisenhower, who disliked partisan politics and politicians, left much of the building and sustaining of the Republican Party to Vice President Nixon. Eisenhower knew how ill-prepared Vice President Truman had been on major issues such as the atomic bomb when he suddenly became president in 1945, and therefore made sure to keep Nixon fully involved in the administration. He gave Nixon multiple diplomatic, domestic, and political assignments so that he "evolved into one of Ike's most valuable subordinates." The office of vice president was thereby fundamentally upgraded from a minor ceremonial post to a major role in the presidential team. Nixon went well beyond the assignment, "[throwing] himself into state and local politics, making hundreds of speeches across the land. With Eisenhower uninvolved in party building, Nixon became the de facto national GOP leader."

=== Press corps ===
In his two terms he delivered about 750 speeches and conducted 193 news conferences. On January 19, 1955, Eisenhower became the first president to conduct a televised news conference. Reporters found performance at press conferences as awkward. Some concluded mistakenly that he was ill-informed or merely a figurehead. At times, he was able to use his reputation to deliberately obfuscate his position on difficult subjects.
His press secretary, James Hagerty, was known for providing much more detail on the lifestyle of the president than previous press secretaries; for example, he covered in great detail Eisenhower's medical condition. Most of the time, he handled routine affairs such as daily reports on presidential activities, defending presidential policies, and assisting diplomatic visitors. He handled embarrassing episodes, such as those related to the Soviet downing of an American spy plane, the U-2 in 1960. He handled press relations on Eisenhower's international trips, sometimes taking the blame from a hostile foreign press. Eisenhower often relied upon him for advice about public opinion, and how to phrase complex issues. Hagerty had a reputation for supporting civil rights initiatives. Historian Robert Hugh Ferrell considered him to be the best press secretary in presidential history, because he "organized the presidency for the single innovation in press relations that has itself almost changed the nature of the nation's highest office in recent decades."

=== Continuity of government ===
As early as 1956, per a memo on page 256 of a 2021 book, Eisenhower established emergency administrators in the event of a national crisis, such as a nuclear attack. The formerly classified memo, "Wartime Structure of the Executive Branch", specifies an Office of War Resources directly under the president, including a War Communications Administration and formerly undisclosed Office for Free World Cooperation. The memo does not specify person(s) selected to head the Office of War Resources. A 2010 publication confirms the Office of War Resources plan. The selection and appointment of these administrator-designates was classified Top Secret. In an emergency, each administrator was to take charge of a specifically activated agency to maintain the continuity of government. Named to the group were:

- Theodore F. Koop, Vice President of CBS – Emergency Censorship Agency
- Frank Stanton, President of CBS – Emergency Communications Agency
- John Ed Warren, Senior Vice President of First National City Bank – Emergency Energy and Minerals Agency
- Ezra Taft Benson, Secretary of Agriculture – Emergency Food Agency
- Aksel Nielsen, President of Title Guaranty Company – Emergency Housing Agency
- James P. Mitchell, Secretary of Labor – Emergency Manpower Agency
- Harold Boeschenstein, President of Owens-Corning Fiberglass – Emergency Production Agency
- William McChesney Martin, Chairman of the Federal Reserve Board of Governors – Emergency Stabilization Agency
- Frank Pace, Executive Vice President of General Dynamics – Emergency Transport Agency (resigned January 8, 1959)
- George P. Baker, Dean of Harvard Business School – Emergency Transport Agency (after January 8, 1959)

Research in 2024 subsequently revealed the existence of standby emergency legislation to be used in a possible nuclear war situation. Known as the Defense Resources Act, this legislative text entered the Congressional Record in 1983. According to page 182 (printed page) of the relevant pdf, the Act would authorize establishment of Censorship of Communications and other emergency federal powers:

"Whenever the President shall deem that the public safety demands it, he may cause to be censored under such rules and regulations as he may from time to time establish, communications by mail, cable radio, television or other means of transmission crossing the borders of the United States which for the purposes of this section shall include territories and possessions, the Canal Zone, the Commonwealth of Puerto Rico, the Trust Territories and other areas under the jurisdiction of the United States, or communications which may be carried by any vessel, airplane or other means of transportation bound to or from any foreign country and touching at any port or place of the United States."

== Judicial appointments ==
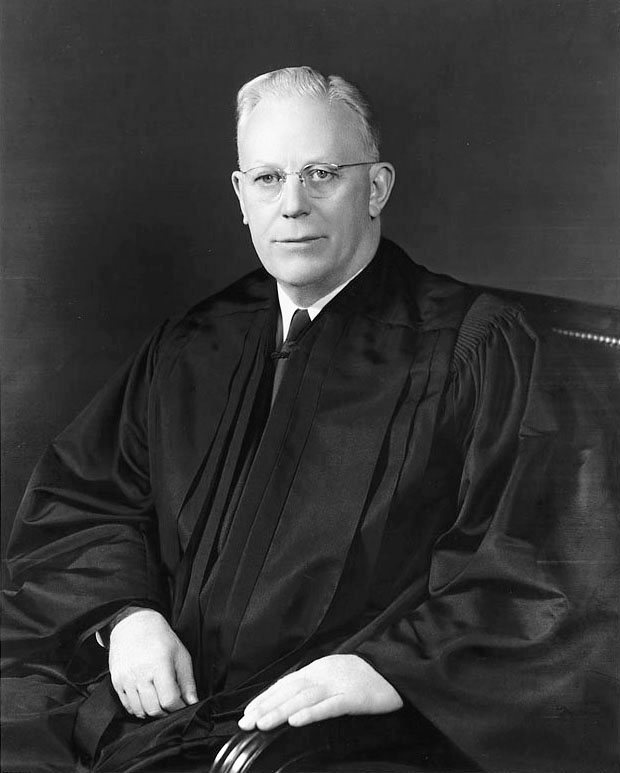
Earl Warren, the 14th chief justice of the United States, presided over the liberal Warren Court from October 1953 until June 1969.

Eisenhower appointed five justices of the Supreme Court of the United States. In 1953, Eisenhower nominated Governor Earl Warren of California to succeed Chief Justice Fred M. Vinson. Many conservative Republicans opposed Warren's nomination, but they were unable to block the appointment, and Warren's nomination was approved by the Senate in January 1954. Warren presided over a court that generated numerous liberal rulings on various topics, beginning in 1954 with the desegregation case of Brown v. Board of Education. Eisenhower approved of the Brown decision. Robert H. Jackson's death in late 1954 generated another vacancy on the Supreme Court, and Eisenhower successfully nominated federal appellate judge John Marshall Harlan II to succeed Jackson. Harlan joined the conservative bloc on the bench, often supporting the position of Associate Justice Felix Frankfurter.

After Sherman Minton resigned in 1956, Eisenhower nominated state supreme court justice William J. Brennan to the Supreme Court. Eisenhower hoped that the appointment of Brennan, a liberal-leaning Catholic, would boost his own re-election campaign. Opposition from Senator Joseph McCarthy and others delayed Brennan's confirmation, so Eisenhower placed Brennan on the court via a recess appointment in 1956; the Senate confirmed Brennan's nomination in early 1957. Brennan joined Warren as a leader of the court's liberal bloc. Stanley Reed's retirement in 1957 created another vacancy, and Eisenhower nominated federal appellate judge Charles Evans Whittaker, who would serve on the Supreme Court for just five years before resigning. The fifth and final Supreme Court vacancy of Eisenhower's tenure arose in 1958 due to the retirement of Harold Burton. Eisenhower successfully nominated federal appellate judge Potter Stewart to succeed Burton, and Stewart became a centrist on the court.

Eisenhower paid attention to Supreme Court appointments. Other judicial nominees were selected by the Attorney General, Herbert Brownell, usually in consultation with the state's senators. The administration appointed 45 judges to the United States Courts of Appeals, and 129 judges to the United States district courts. Since nearly all were appointed to serve specific geographical area, their regional origins matched the national population. All were white men. Most judges had an upper-middle-class background. One in five attended an Ivy League undergraduate college; half attended an Ivy League law school. Party affiliation was decisive: 93% of the men were Republicans, 7% Democrats; relatively few had been conspicuous in elective politics. Nearly 80% of the men were Protestants, 15% Catholic, and 6% Jewish.

== Foreign affairs ==
=== Cold War ===
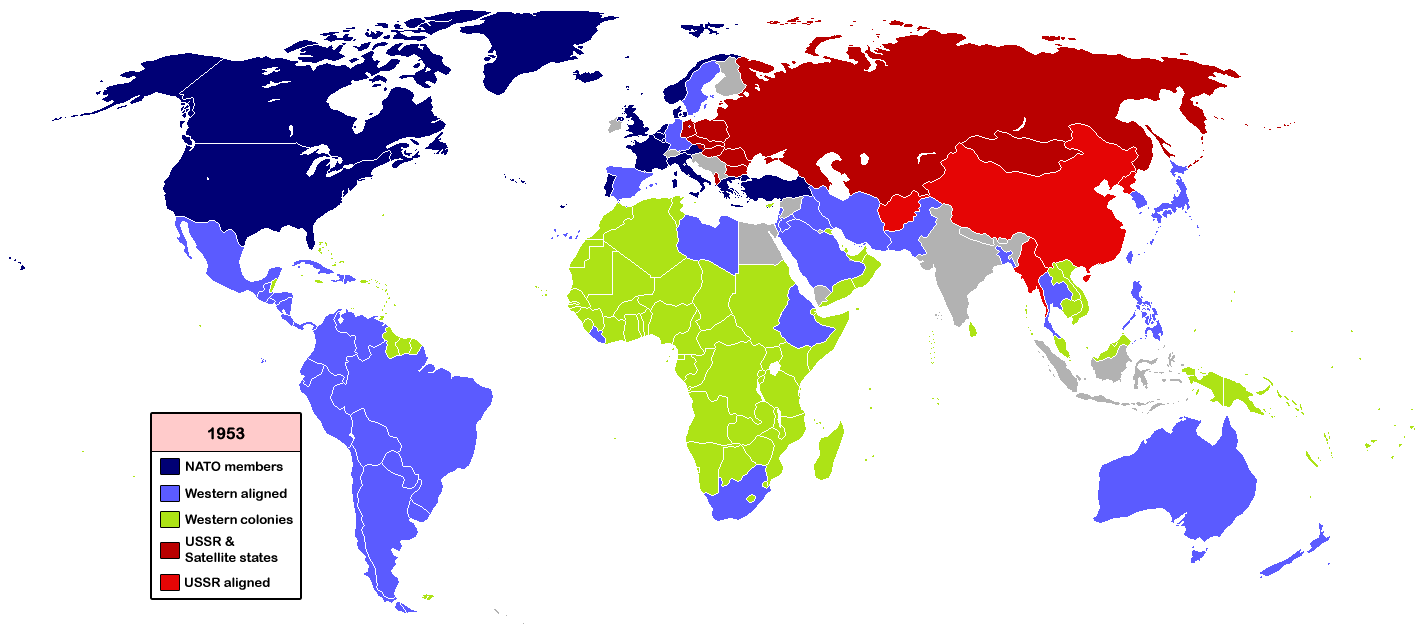
A map of the geopolitical situation in 1953

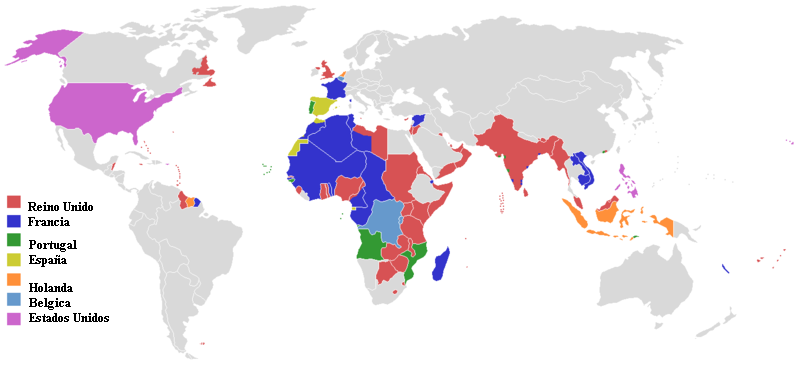
Colonial powers in 1945

The Cold War dominated international politics in the 1950s. As both the United States and the Soviet Union possessed nuclear weapons, any conflict presented the risk of escalation into nuclear warfare. The isolationist element led by Senator Taft would avoid war by staying out of European affairs. Eisenhower's 1952 candidacy was motivated by his opposition to Taft's isolationist views in opposition to NATO and American reliance on collective security with Western Europe. Eisenhower continued the basic Truman administration policy of containment of Soviet expansion but added a concern with propaganda suggesting eventual liberation of Eastern Europe.

Eisenhower's overall Cold War policy was codified in NSC 174, which held that the rollback of Soviet influence was a long-term goal, but that NATO would not provoke war with the Soviet Union. Peace would be maintained by being so much stronger in terms of atomic weapons than the USSR that it would never risk using its much larger land-based army to attack Western Europe. He planned for to mobilize psychological insights, CIA intelligence and American scientific technological superiority counter conventional Soviet forces.

After Stalin died in March 1953, Georgy Malenkov took leadership of the Soviet Union. Malenkov proposed a "peaceful coexistence" with the West, and British prime minister Winston Churchill proposed a summit of the world leaders. Fearing that the summit would delay the rearmament of West Germany, and skeptical of Malenkov's intentions, Eisenhower rejected the summit idea. In April, Eisenhower delivered his "Chance for Peace speech", in which he called for an armistice in Korea, free elections to re-unify Germany, the "full independence" of Eastern European nations, and United Nations control of atomic energy. Though well received in the West, the Soviet leadership viewed Eisenhower's speech as little more than propaganda. In 1954, a more confrontational leader, Nikita Khrushchev, took charge in the Soviet Union. Eisenhower became increasingly skeptical of the possibility of cooperation with the Soviet Union after it refused to support his Atoms for Peace proposal, which called for the creation of the International Atomic Energy Agency (IAEA) and the creation of peaceful nuclear power plants.

==== National security policy ====
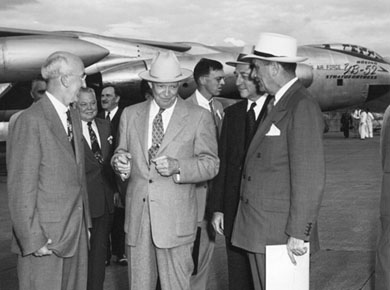
Eisenhower and members of his Cabinet inspect the YB-52 prototype of the B-52, c.1954

Eisenhower unveiled the New Look, his first national security policy, on October 30, 1953. It reflected his concern for balancing the Cold War military commitments of the United States with the risk of overwhelming the nation's financial resources. The new policy emphasized reliance on strategic nuclear weapons, rather than conventional military power, to deter both conventional and nuclear military threats. The U.S. military developed a strategy of nuclear deterrence based upon the triad of land-based intercontinental ballistic missiles (ICBMs), strategic bombers, and submarine-launched ballistic missiles (SLBMs).
Throughout his presidency, Eisenhower insisted on having plans to retaliate, fight, and win a nuclear war against the Soviets, although he hoped he would never feel forced to use such weapons.

As the fighting in Korea ended, Eisenhower sharply reduced the reliance on expensive Army divisions. Historian Saki Dockrill argued that his long-term strategy was to promote the collective security of NATO and other American allies, strengthen the Third World against Soviet pressures, avoid another Korean stalemate, and produce a momentum that would steadily weaken Soviet power and influence. Dockrill pointed to Eisenhower's use of multiple assets against the Soviet Union:

Eisenhower knew that the United States had many other assets that could be translated into influence over the Soviet bloc—its democratic values and institutions, its rich and competitive capitalist economy, its intelligence technology and skills in obtaining information as to the enemy's capabilities and intentions, its psychological warfare and covert operations capabilities, its negotiating skills, and its economic and military assistance to the Third World.

In 1953, the Eisenhower administration's National Security Council wrote three policy papers on opposing the People's Republic of China. NSC 146 proposed backing Republic of China maritime raids and raids against mainland China. NSC 148 proposed to foster and support anti-communist Chinese elements both inside and outside of the country. NSC 166 proposed strategies to deny the PRC full status in the international community, pursuant to the view that making any concessions would strengthen the PRC.

==== Ballistic missiles and arms control ====
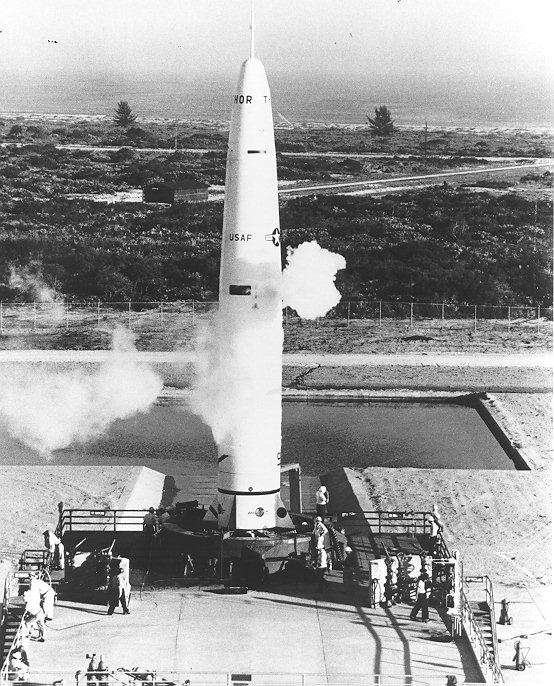
First test launch of the PGM-17 Thor from Cape Canaveral Launch Complex 17B, January 25, 1957

Eisenhower held office during a period in which both the United States and the Soviet Union developed nuclear stockpiles theoretically capable of destroying not just each other, but all life on Earth. The United States had tested the first atomic bomb in 1945, and both the superpowers had tested thermonuclear weapons by the end of 1953. Strategic bombers had been the delivery method of previous nuclear weapons, but Eisenhower sought to create a nuclear triad consisting of land-launched nuclear missiles, nuclear-missile-armed submarines, and strategic aircraft. Throughout the 1950s, both the United States and the Soviet Union developed intercontinental ballistic missile (ICBMs) and intermediate-range ballistic missile (IRBMs) capable of delivering nuclear warheads. Eisenhower also presided over the development of the UGM-27 Polaris missile, which was capable of being launched from submarines, and continued funding for long-range bombers like the Boeing B-52 Stratofortress.

In January 1956 the US Air Force began developing the Thor, a 1,500 miles (2,400 km) Intermediate-range ballistic missile. The program proceeded quickly, and beginning in 1958 the first of 20 Royal Air Force Thor squadrons became operational in the United Kingdom. This was the first experiment at sharing strategic nuclear weapons in NATO and led to other placements abroad of American nuclear weapons. Critics at the time, led by Democratic senator John F. Kennedy of Massachusetts levied charges to the effect that there was a "missile gap", that is, the U.S. had fallen militarily behind the Soviets because of their lead in space. Historians now discount those allegations, although they agree that Eisenhower did not effectively respond to his critics. In fact, the Soviet Union did not deploy ICBMs until after Eisenhower left office, and the U.S. retained an overall advantage in nuclear weaponry. Eisenhower was aware of the American advantage in ICBM development because of intelligence gathered by U-2 planes, which had begun flying over the Soviet Union in 1956.

The administration decided the best way to minimize the proliferation of nuclear weapons was to tightly control knowledge of gas-centrifuge technology, which was essential to turn ordinary uranium into weapons-grade uranium. American diplomats by 1960 reached agreement with the German, Dutch, and British governments to limit access to the technology. The four-power understanding on gas-centrifuge secrecy would last until 1975, when scientist Abdul Qadeer Khan took the Dutch centrifuge technology to Pakistan. France sought American help in developing its own nuclear program, but Eisenhower rejected these overtures due to France's instability and his distrust of French leader Charles de Gaulle.

=== End of the Korean War ===
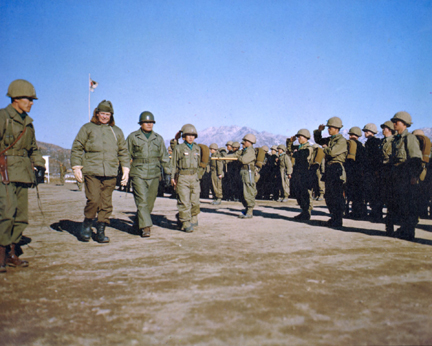
Eisenhower (left) reviews troops of the Republic of Korea's Capitol Division, December 1952

During his campaign, Eisenhower said he would go to Korea to end the Korean War, which had begun on June 25, 1950, when North Korea and its dictator Kim Il-sung invaded South Korea. The U.S. had joined the war to prevent the fall of South Korea, later expanding the mission to include victory over the Communist regime in North Korea. The intervention of Chinese forces in late 1950 led to a protracted stalemate around the 38th parallel north.

Truman had begun peace talks in mid-1951, but the issue of North Korean and Chinese prisoners remained a sticking point. Over 40,000 prisoners from the two countries refused repatriation, but North Korea and China nonetheless demanded their return. Upon taking office, Eisenhower demanded a solution, warning China that he would use nuclear weapons if the war continued. Whether China was informed of the potential for nuclear force is unknown. South Korean leader Syngman Rhee attempted to derail peace negotiations by releasing North Korean prisoners who refused repatriation, but Rhee agreed to accept an armistice after Eisenhower threatened to withdraw all U.S. forces from Korea. On July 27, 1953, the United States, North Korea, and China agreed to the Korean Armistice Agreement, ending the Korean War. Historian Edward C. Keefer says that in accepting the American demands that POWs could refuse to return to their home country, "China and North Korea still swallowed the bitter pill, probably forced down in part by the atomic ultimatum." Historian William I. Hitchcock writes that the key factors in reaching the armistice were the exhaustion of North Korean forces and the desire of the Soviet leaders (who exerted pressure on China) to avoid nuclear war.

The armistice led to decades of uneasy peace between North Korea and South Korea. The United States and South Korea signed a defensive treaty in October 1953, and the U.S. would continue to station thousands of soldiers in South Korea long after the end of the Korean War.

=== Covert actions ===
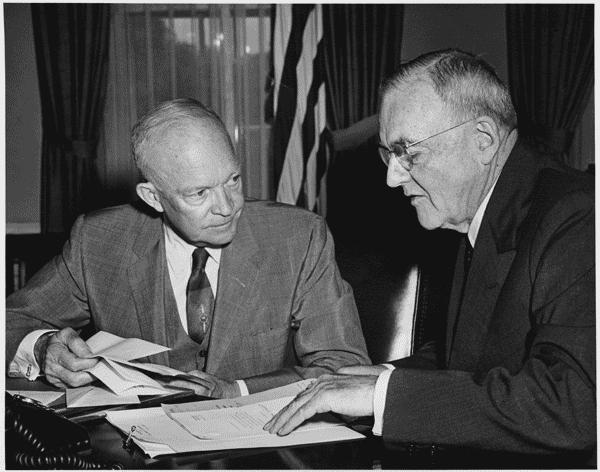
President Eisenhower (left, pictured here in 1956) with U.S. secretary of state John Foster Dulles, the advocate of the 1954 Guatemalan coup d'état

Eisenhower, while accepting the doctrine of containment, sought to counter the Soviet Union through more active means as detailed in the State-Defense report NSC 68. The Eisenhower administration and the Central Intelligence Agency (CIA) used covert action to interfere with governments abroad.

==== Iran ====
During his first year in office, Eisenhower approved a CIA operation (1953 Iranian coup d'état) to address a growing crisis in Iran that had begun under President Truman. In 1951, Iran's parliament nationalized the Anglo-Iranian Oil Company, previously controlled by Britain, which prompted a British-led economic blockade that strained Iran's economy. Despite the pressure, Prime Minister Mohammed Mossadegh stood firm. Eisenhower was concerned about Mossadegh's openness to alliances with Iran's Communist factions and feared the prime minister might weaken the authority of Shah Mohammed Reza Pahlavi, a crucial anti-Communist ally. In August 1953, the CIA backed a coup that removed Mossadegh from power and reinstated the Shah's authority. Following the coup, a new agreement allowed American oil companies to share access to Iran's petroleum resources alongside the British.

==== Guatemala ====
The following year, Eisenhower authorized another covert CIA operation (1954 Guatemalan coup d'état), this time in Guatemala. The administration was alarmed by President Jacobo Arbenz Guzmán's perceived closeness to Communists, although their influence in his government was relatively minor. Later research suggests that Arbenz privately embraced Marxist ideas and aimed to modernize Guatemala's economy through reforms, particularly a land redistribution plan targeting large estates owned by the United Fruit Company. This move provoked backlash in the United States, especially after Arbenz acquired weapons from Communist Czechoslovakia in response to a U.S. arms embargo. Concerned about growing Soviet influence in the region, the Eisenhower administration supported a CIA-led effort that helped oust Arbenz in June 1954. Despite Guatemala's protests to the United Nations, U.S. officials denied involvement. After the coup, the new leader, Carlos Castillo Armas, reversed land reforms, took a hard stance against Communism, and rolled back democratic freedoms. He was assassinated in 1957. Critics have produced conspiracy theories about the causal factors, but according to historian Stephen M. Streeter, CIA documents show the United Fruit Company played no major role in Eisenhower's decision, that the Eisenhower administration did not need to be forced into the action by any lobby groups, and that Soviet influence in Guatemala was minimal.

==== Congo ====
In the early 21st century, declassified documents revealed that the Congolese leaders who overthrew Patrice Lumumba, Prime Minister of the Democratic Republic of the Congo, and transferred him to the Katangan authorities, including Mobutu Sese Seko and Joseph Kasa-Vubu, received money and weapons directly from the CIA. The same disclosure showed that, at the time, the U.S. government believed that Lumumba was a communist. In 2013, the U.S. State Department admitted that Eisenhower discussed plans at a National Security Council meeting on August 18, 1960 to assassinate Lumumba. However, documents released in 2017 revealed that an American role in Lumumba's murder was only under consideration by the CIA.

=== Defeating the Bricker Amendment ===
In January 1953, Senator John W. Bricker of Ohio re-introduced the Bricker Amendment, which would limit the president's treaty making power and ability to enter into executive agreements with foreign nations. Fears that the steady stream of post-World War II-era international treaties and executive agreements entered into by the U.S. were undermining the nation's sovereignty united isolationists, conservative Democrats, most Republicans, and numerous professional groups and civic organizations behind the amendment. Believing that the amendment would weaken the president to such a degree that it would be impossible for the U.S. to exercise leadership on the global stage, Eisenhower worked with Senate minority leader Lyndon B. Johnson to defeat Bricker's proposal. Although the amendment started out with 56 co-sponsors, it went down to defeat in the U.S. Senate in 1954 on 42–50 vote. Later in 1954, a watered-down version of the amendment missed the required two-thirds majority in the Senate by one vote. This episode proved to be the last hurrah for the isolationist Republicans, as younger conservatives increasingly turned to an internationalism based on aggressive anti-communism, typified by Senator Barry Goldwater.

=== Europe ===
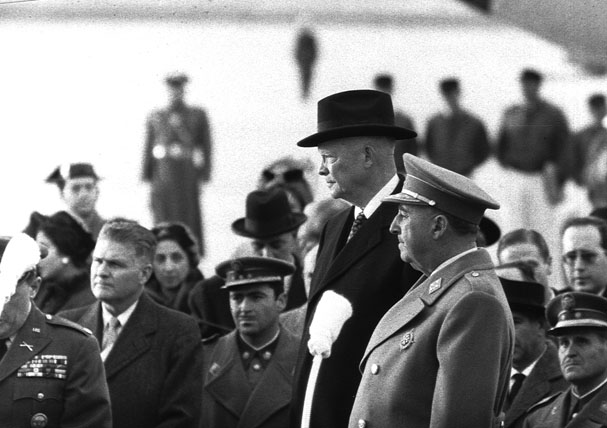
Spanish dictator Francisco Franco and Eisenhower in Madrid, 1959

Eisenhower sought troop reductions in Europe by sharing of defense responsibilities with NATO allies. Europeans, however, never quite trusted the idea of nuclear deterrence and were reluctant to shift away from NATO into a proposed European Defence Community (EDC). Like Truman, Eisenhower believed that the rearmament of West Germany was vital to NATO's strategic interests. The administration backed an arrangement, devised by Churchill and British Foreign Minister Anthony Eden, in which West Germany was rearmed and became a fully sovereign member of NATO in return for promises to not establish atomic, biological, or chemical weapons programs. European leaders also created the Western European Union to coordinate European defense. In response to the integration of West Germany into NATO, Eastern bloc leaders established the Warsaw Pact. Austria, which had been jointly-occupied by the Soviet Union and the Western powers, regained its sovereignty with the 1955 Austrian State Treaty. As part of the arrangement that ended the occupation, Austria declared its neutrality after gaining independence.

The Eisenhower administration placed a high priority on undermining Soviet influence on Eastern Europe, and escalated a propaganda war under the leadership of Charles Douglas Jackson. The United States dropped over 300,000 propaganda leaflets in Eastern Europe between 1951 and 1956, and Radio Free Europe sent broadcasts throughout the region. A 1953 uprising in East Germany briefly stoked the administration's hopes of a decline in Soviet influence, but the USSR quickly crushed the insurrection. In 1956, a major uprising broke out in Hungary. After Hungarian leader Imre Nagy promised the establishment of a multiparty democracy and withdrawal from the Warsaw Pact, Soviet leader Nikita Khrushchev dispatched 60,000 soldiers into Hungary to crush the rebellion. The United States strongly condemned the military response but did not take direct action, disappointing many Hungarian revolutionaries. After the revolution, the United States shifted from encouraging revolt to seeking cultural and economic ties as a means of undermining Communist regimes. Among the administration's cultural diplomacy initiatives were continuous goodwill tours by the "soldier-musician ambassadors" of the Seventh Army Symphony Orchestra.

In 1953, Eisenhower opened relations with Spain under dictator Francisco Franco. Despite its undemocratic nature, Spain's strategic position in light of the Cold War and anti-communist position led Eisenhower to build a trade and military alliance with the Spanish through the Pact of Madrid. These relations brought an end to Spain's isolation after World War II, which in turn led to a Spanish economic boom known as the Spanish miracle.

=== East Asia and Southeast Asia ===
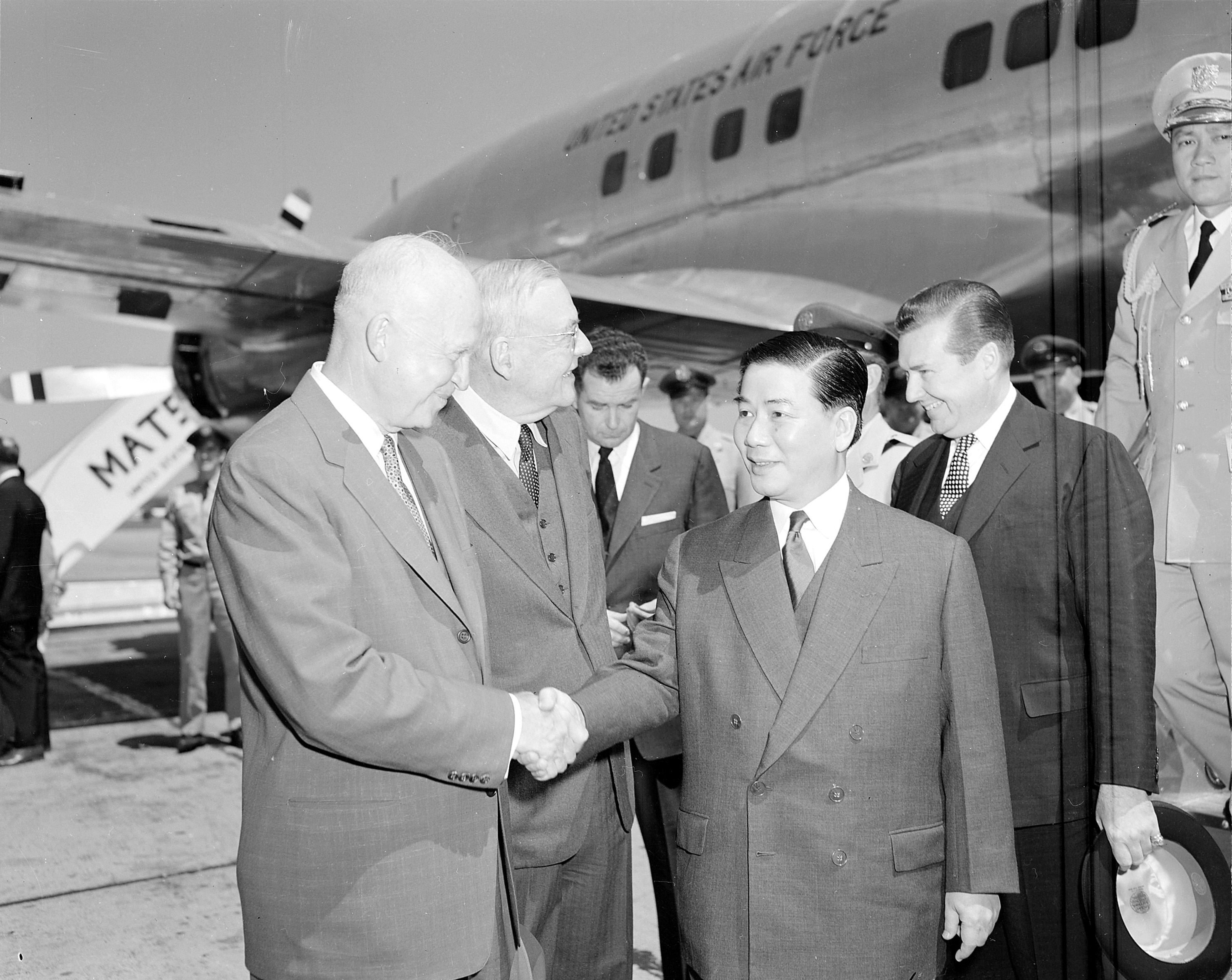
President Eisenhower and Secretary of State John Foster Dulles greet President Ngô Đình Diệm of South Vietnam, May 1957

After the end of World War II, the Việt Minh launched an insurrection against the French-associated State of Vietnam. Seeking to support France and prevent the fall of Vietnam to Communism, the U.S. played a major role in financing French military operations in Vietnam. By 1954, the Eisenhower administration was paying more than 75 percent of France's military expenditures in the First Indochina War. The French requested U.S. aid in the Battle of Dien Bien Phu, which proved to be the climactic battle of the war. To underscore the importance of Vietnam, Eisenhower unveiled publicly on April 7, 1954, the domino theory, warning that if it should fall to Communism the rest of Southeast Asia might soon follow. Congress refused to endorse intervention without the participation of Britain and French pledges of independence for Vietnam. The French were defeated at Dien Bien Phu on May 7, 1954. At the Geneva Conference, China and the Soviet Union pressed Viet Minh leaders to accept a compromise involving the temporary division of Vietnam and future reunification elections; the country was divided into communist North Vietnam (under the leadership of Ho Chi Minh) and non-communist South Vietnam (under the leadership of Ngo Dinh Diem). Despite some doubts about the strength of Diem's government, the Eisenhower administration directed aid to the South in the hopes of creating a bulwark against further Communist expansion. With the backing of the Eisenhower administration, Diem refused to participate in the 1956 reunification elections envisaged by the Geneva Accords, arguing that the State of Vietnam had not accepted the accords that established the division of Vietnam and that elections held in North Vietnam would not be free or fair. In the years that followed, Eisenhower increased the number of U.S. military advisors in South Vietnam to 900.

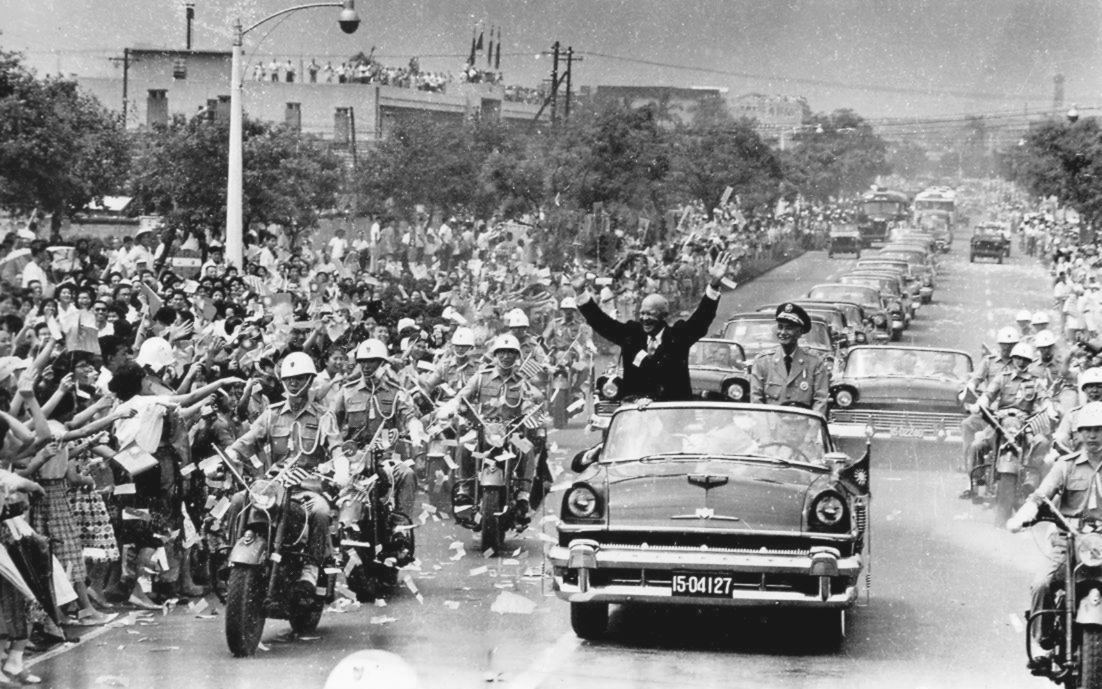
Eisenhower with Republic of China president Chiang Kai-shek during his visit to Taipei in June 1960

In 1954, the United States and seven other countries created the Southeast Asia Treaty Organization (SEATO), a defensive alliance dedicated to preventing the spread of Communism in Southeast Asia. One lasting consequence of the Korean War was continued hostility between the United States and the People's Republic of China (PRC). Like his predecessor, President Truman, Eisenhower declined to recognize the communist government in Beijing and instead maintained support for Chiang Kai-shek's Nationalist regime, which had relocated to Taiwan. Tensions escalated in September 1954, when the PRC began shelling the offshore islands of Quemoy and Matsu, held by the Nationalists. In response, Congress authorized Eisenhower to use military force in the Taiwan Strait if necessary. Although the islands held little military significance, both the PRC and the Nationalists viewed them as symbols of sovereignty over all of China. The situation intensified when Eisenhower publicly stated that, in the event of conflict in East Asia, he would consider using tactical nuclear weapons against military targets as readily as conventional arms. Privately, Eisenhower was frustrated by Chiang's inflexible stance, but his own rhetoric raised fears of a broader confrontation. The Taiwan crisis ended when China halted its shelling and both sides agreed to diplomatic talks; a second crisis in 1958 would end in a similar fashion. During the first crisis, the United States and the Republic of China (ROC) signed a mutual defense treaty, which committed the United States to the defense of Taiwan. The CIA also supported dissidents in the 1959 Tibetan uprising, but China crushed the uprising. By the end of 1954, the National Security Council, Joint Chiefs of Staff, and State Department had urged Eisenhower, on at least five occasions, to drop atomic bombs on China, but each time he refused.

In Indonesia, rebels in Sumatra and Sulawesi formed in February 1958 the PRRI-Permesta Movement which the goal of overthrowing the Sukarno government. Due to their anti-communist rhetoric, the rebels received money, weapons, and manpower from the CIA. This support ended when Allen Lawrence Pope, an American pilot, was shot down after a bombing raid on government-held Ambon in April 1958. In April 1958, the central government responded by launching airborne and seaborne military invasions on Padang and Manado, the rebel capitals. By the end of 1958, the rebels had been militarily defeated, and the remaining rebel guerrilla forces surrendered in August 1961.

=== Middle East ===
The Middle East became increasingly important to U.S. foreign policy during the 1950s. After the 1953 Iranian coup, the U.S. supplanted Britain as the most influential ally of Iran. Eisenhower encouraged the creation of the Baghdad Pact, a military alliance consisting of Turkey, Iran, Iraq, and Pakistan. As it did in several other regions, the Eisenhower administration sought to establish stable, friendly, anti-Communist regimes in the Arab World. The U.S. attempted to mediate the Arab–Israeli conflict, but Israel's unwillingness to give up its gains from the 1948 Arab–Israeli War and Arab hostility towards Israel prevented any agreement.

==== Suez crisis ====
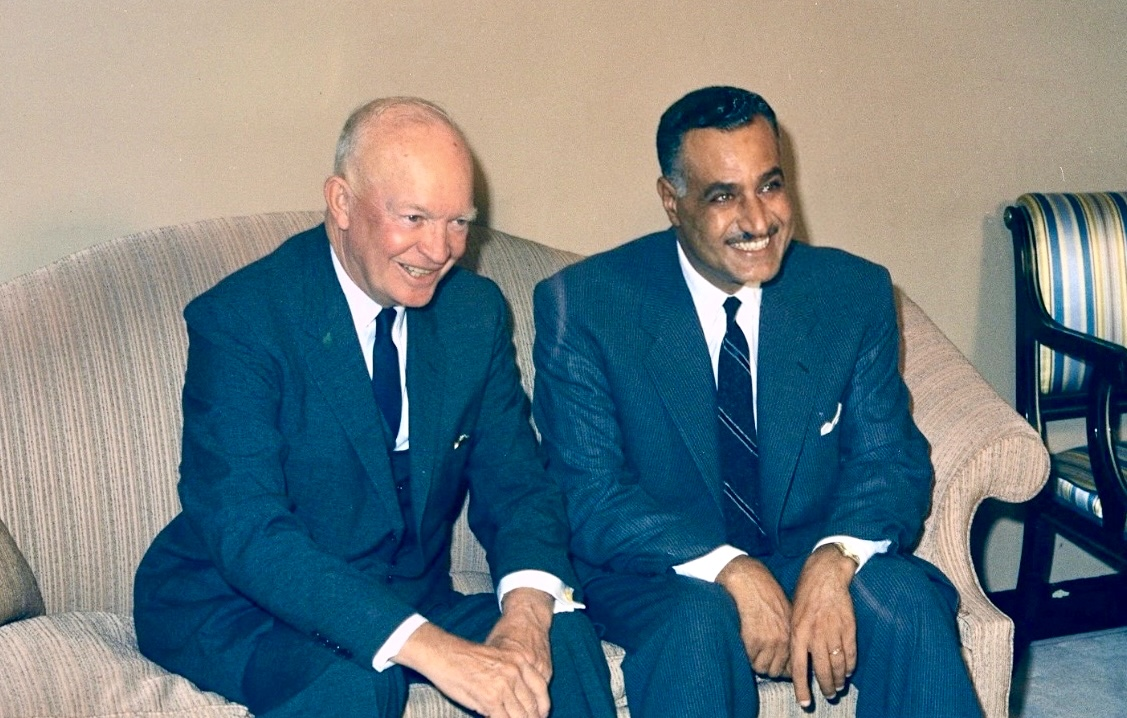
Eisenhower meeting with Egyptian president Gamal Abdel Nasser during Nasser's visit to United Nations in New York City, September 1960

In 1952, a revolution led by Gamal Abdel Nasser had overthrown the pro-British Egyptian government. After taking power as Prime Minister of Egypt in 1954, Nasser played the Soviet Union and the United States against each other, seeking aid from both sides. Eisenhower sought to bring Nasser into the American sphere of influence through economic aid, but Nasser's Arab nationalism and opposition to Israel served as a source of friction between the United States and Egypt. Nasser had secured weapons from Communist Czechoslovakia and sought American funding for the Aswan High Dam on the Nile River, which would provide immense hydroelectric power and help irrigate much of Egypt. While the Eisenhower administration initially considered supporting the project, it backed out after Nasser extended diplomatic recognition to the People's Republic of China—a move that reinforced U.S. concerns that he was leveraging Cold War tensions for political gain. In July 1956, just a week after the collapse of the aid negotiations, Nasser nationalized the British-run Suez Canal, sparking the Suez Crisis.

The British strongly protested the nationalization, and formed a plan with France and Israel to capture the canal. Eisenhower opposed military intervention, and he repeatedly told British prime minister Anthony Eden that the U.S. would not tolerate an invasion. Though opposed to the nationalization of the canal, Eisenhower feared that a military intervention would disrupt global trade and alienate Middle Eastern countries from the West. Israel attacked Egypt in October 1956, quickly seizing control of the Sinai Peninsula. France and Britain launched air and naval attacks after Nasser refused to renounce Egypt's nationalization of the canal. Nasser responded by sinking dozens of ships, preventing operation of the canal. Angered by the attacks, which risked sending Arab states into the arms of the Soviet Union, the Eisenhower administration proposed a cease fire and used economic pressure to force France and Britain to withdraw. The incident marked the end of British and French dominance in the Middle East and opened the way for greater American involvement in the region. In early 1958, Eisenhower used the threat of economic sanctions to coerce Israel into withdrawing from the Sinai Peninsula, and the Suez Canal resumed operations under the control of Egypt.

==== Eisenhower Doctrine ====
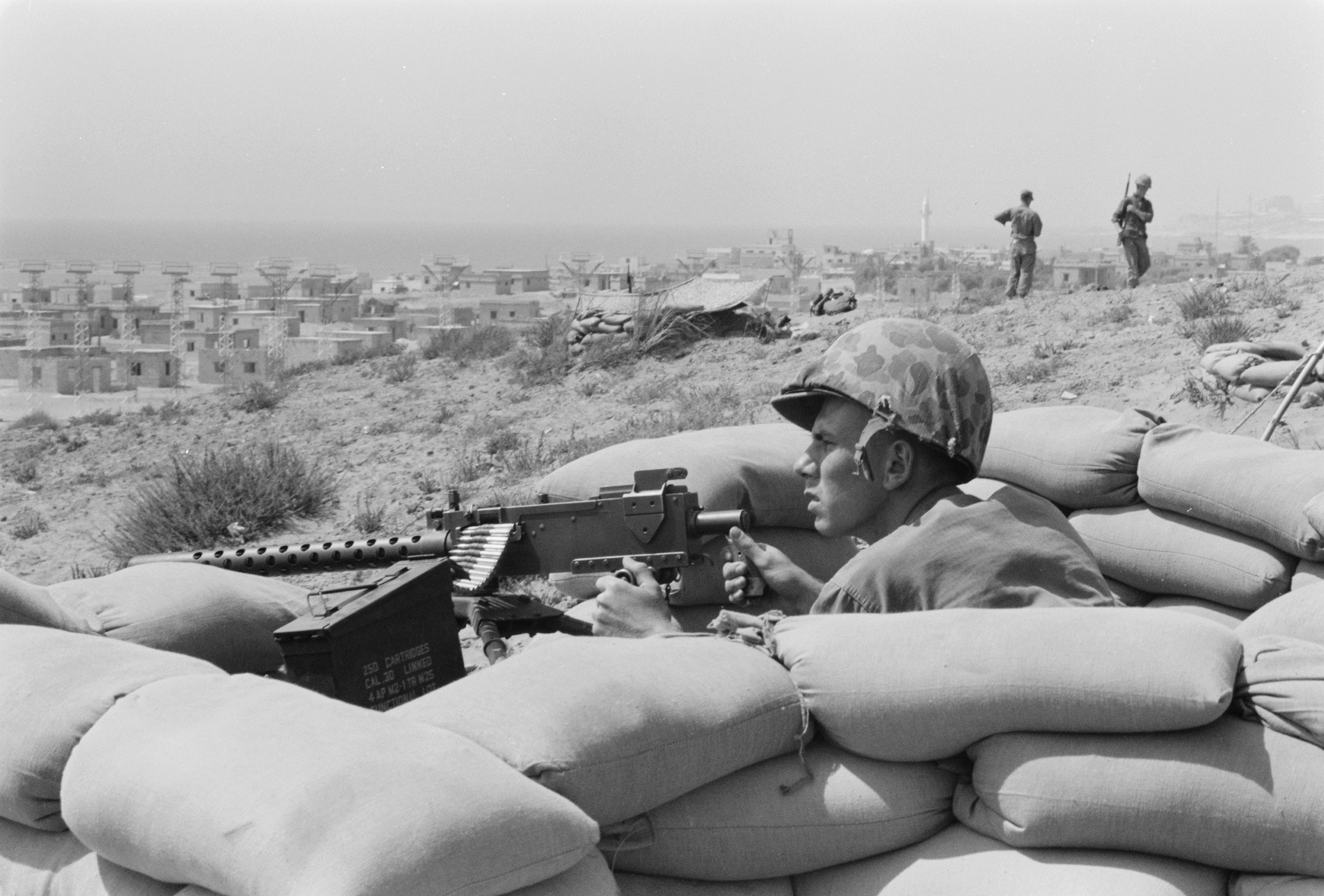
A U.S. Marine in a foxhole outside Beirut during the 1958 Lebanon crisis

In response to the power vacuum in the Middle East following the Suez Crisis, the Eisenhower administration developed a new policy designed to stabilize the region against Soviet threats or internal turmoil. Given the collapse of British prestige and the rise of Soviet interest in the region, the president informed Congress on January 5, 1957, that it was essential for the U.S. to accept new responsibilities for the security of the Middle East. Under the policy, known as the Eisenhower Doctrine, any Middle Eastern country could request American economic assistance or aid from U.S. military forces if it was being threatened by armed aggression. Although Eisenhower never formally invoked the doctrine, he acted in accordance with its principles on several occasions. In the spring of 1957, he provided economic assistance to Jordan and deployed U.S. naval forces to the Eastern Mediterranean to support King Hussein in quelling a rebellion led by pro-Egyptian military officers. Later that year, he urged Turkey and other regional nations to consider taking action against Syria to prevent a radical government from gaining control. Then, in July 1958, following a violent revolution in Iraq that raised fears of regional instability, Eisenhower sent American soldiers to Beirut and arranged the delivery of supplies to British forces stationed in Jordan. The troops sent to Lebanon never saw any fighting, but the deployment marked the only time during Eisenhower's presidency when U.S. troops were sent abroad into a potential combat situation. By the end of that year, however, his administration began to view opposition to Arab nationalism as ineffective and shifted toward a policy of engagement rather than resistance.

=== South Asia ===
The 1947 partition of British India created two new independent states, India and Pakistan. Indian prime minister Jawaharlal Nehru pursued a non-aligned policy in the Cold War, and frequently criticized U.S. policies. Largely out of a desire to build up military strength against the more populous India, Pakistan sought close relations with the United States, joining both the Baghdad Pact and SEATO. This U.S.–Pakistan alliance alienated India from the United States, causing India to move towards the Soviet Union. In the late 1950s, the Eisenhower administration sought closer relations with India, sending aid to stem the 1957 Indian economic crisis. The United States also participated in the World Agriculture Fair held in New Delhi in 1959, setting up one of the biggest pavilions at the fair, showcasing agricultural machinery and various packaged foods from the country. Eisenhower inaugurated the U.S. Pavilion along with Indian president Rajendra Prasad. By the end of his administration, relations between the United States and India had moderately improved, but Pakistan remained the main U.S. ally in South Asia.

=== Latin America ===
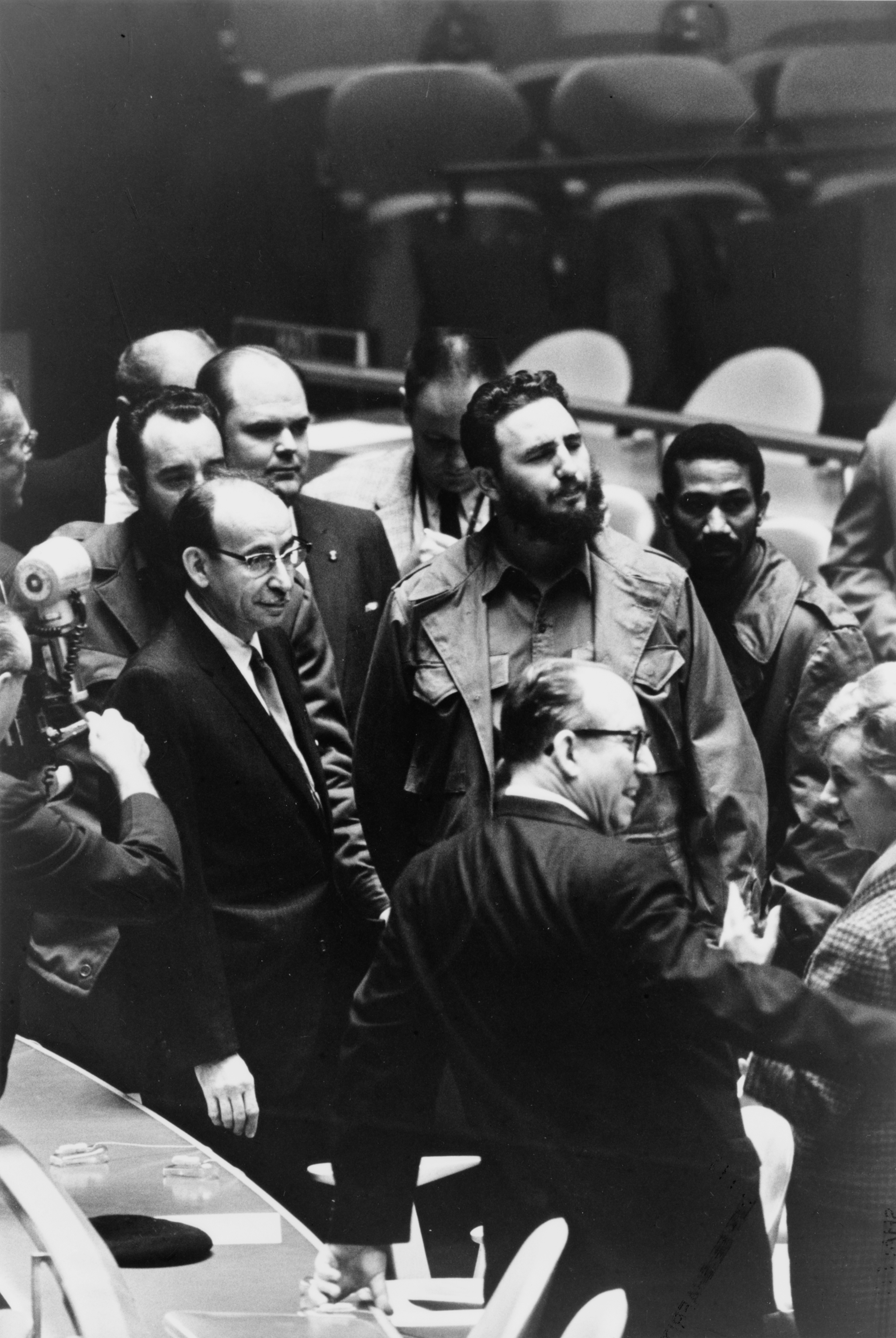
Fidel Castro (center) at a meeting of the 1960 UN General Assembly

For much of his administration, Eisenhower largely continued the policy of his predecessors in Latin America, supporting U.S.-friendly governments regardless of whether they held power through authoritarian means. The Eisenhower administration expanded military aid to Latin America, and used Pan-Americanism as a tool to prevent the spread of Soviet influence. In the late 1950s, several Latin American governments fell, partly due to a recession in the United States.

Cuba was particularly close to the United States outside the Windward Passage near the shores of Haiti under the administration of François Duvalier (Papa Doc), who came to power as the Haitian dictator in 1957, and 300,000 American tourists visited Cuba each year in the late 1950s. Cuban president Fulgencio Batista sought close ties with both the U.S. government and major U.S. companies, and American organized crime also had a strong presence in Cuba. In January 1959, the Cuban Revolution ousted Batista. The new regime, led by Fidel Castro, quickly legalized the Communist Party of Cuba, sparking U.S. fears that Castro would align with the Soviet Union. When Castro visited the United States in April 1959, Eisenhower refused to meet with him, delegating the task to Nixon. In the aftermath of the Cuban Revolution, the Eisenhower administration began to encourage democratic government in Latin America and increased economic aid to the region. As Castro drew closer to the Soviet Union, the U.S. broke diplomatic relations, launched a near-total embargo, and began preparations for an invasion of Cuba by Cuban exiles.

=== U-2 Crisis ===
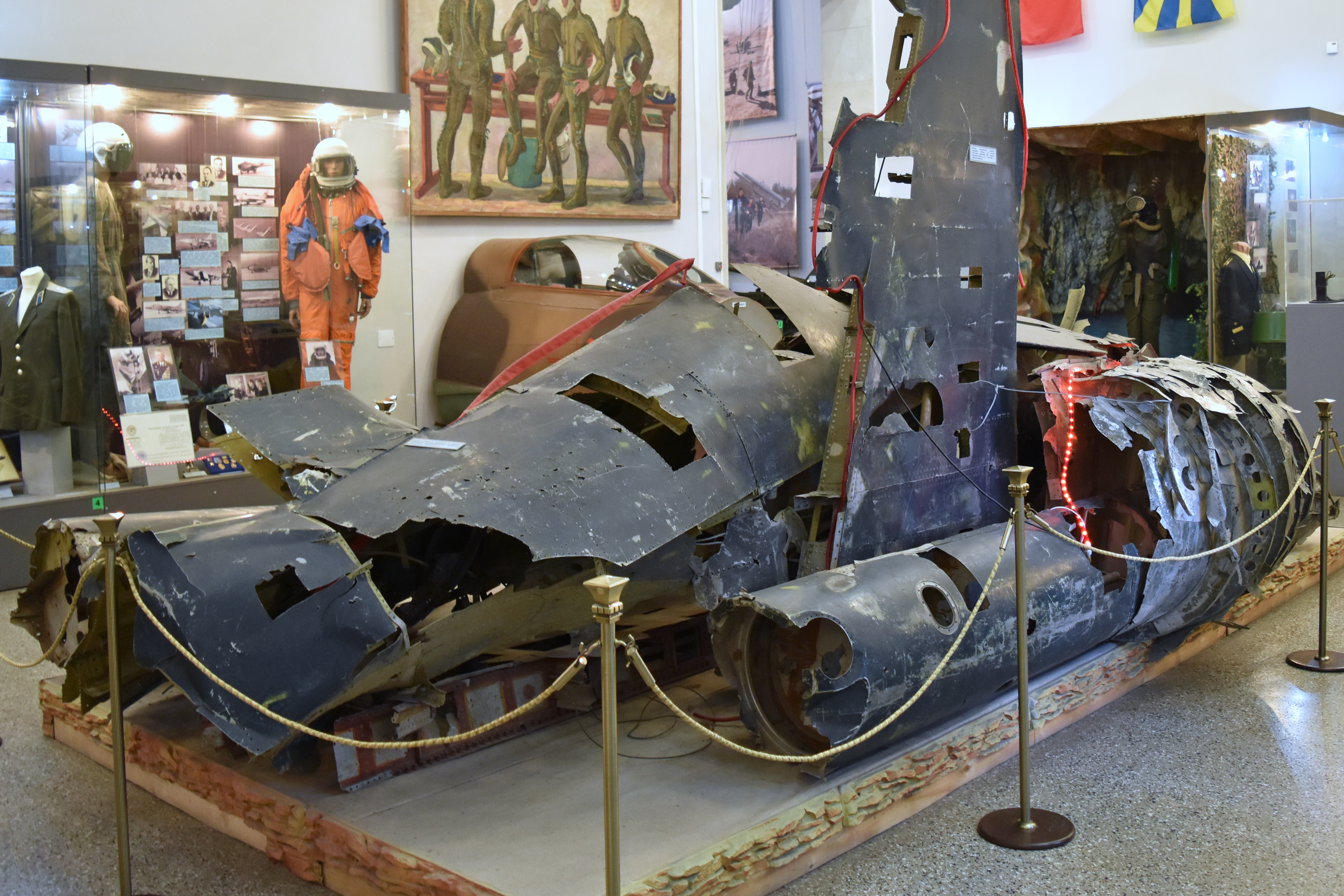
The wreckage of the American Lockheed U-2 Dragon Lady Shotdown 65 years ago now on display at the Central Armed Forces Museum in Moscow

U.S. and Soviet leaders met at the 1955 Geneva Summit, the first such summit since the 1945 Potsdam Conference. No progress was made on major issues; the two sides had major differences on German policy, and the Soviets dismissed Eisenhower's "Open Skies" proposal. Despite the lack of agreement on substantive issues, the conference marked the start of a minor thaw in Cold War relations. Khruschev toured the United States in September 1959, and he and Eisenhower conducted high-level talks regarding nuclear disarmament and the status of Berlin. Eisenhower wanted limits on nuclear weapons testing and on-site inspections of nuclear weapons, while Khruschev initially sought the total elimination of nuclear arsenals. Both wanted to limit total military spending and prevent nuclear proliferation, but Cold War tensions made negotiations difficult. Towards the end of his second term, Eisenhower was determined to reach a nuclear test ban treaty as part of an overall move towards détente with the Soviet Union. Khrushchev had also become increasingly interested in reaching an accord, partly due to the growing Sino-Soviet split. By 1960, the major unresolved issue was on-site inspections, as both sides sought nuclear test bans. Hopes for reaching a nuclear agreement at a May 1960 summit in Paris were derailed by the downing of an American U-2 spy plane (conducting photographic aerial reconnaissance) over the Soviet Union.

The Eisenhower administration, initially thinking the pilot had died in the crash, authorized the release of a cover story claiming that the plane was a "weather research aircraft" which had unintentionally strayed into Soviet airspace after the pilot had radioed "difficulties with his oxygen equipment" while flying over Turkey. Further, Eisenhower said that his administration had not been spying on the Soviet Union; when the Soviets produced the pilot, Captain Francis Gary Powers, the Americans were caught misleading the public, and the incident resulted in international embarrassment for the United States. The Senate Foreign Relations Committee held a lengthy inquiry into the U-2 incident. During the Paris Summit, Eisenhower accused Khrushchev "of sabotaging this meeting, on which so much of the hopes of the world have rested." Later, Eisenhower stated the summit had been ruined because of that "stupid U-2 business".

=== List of international trips ===
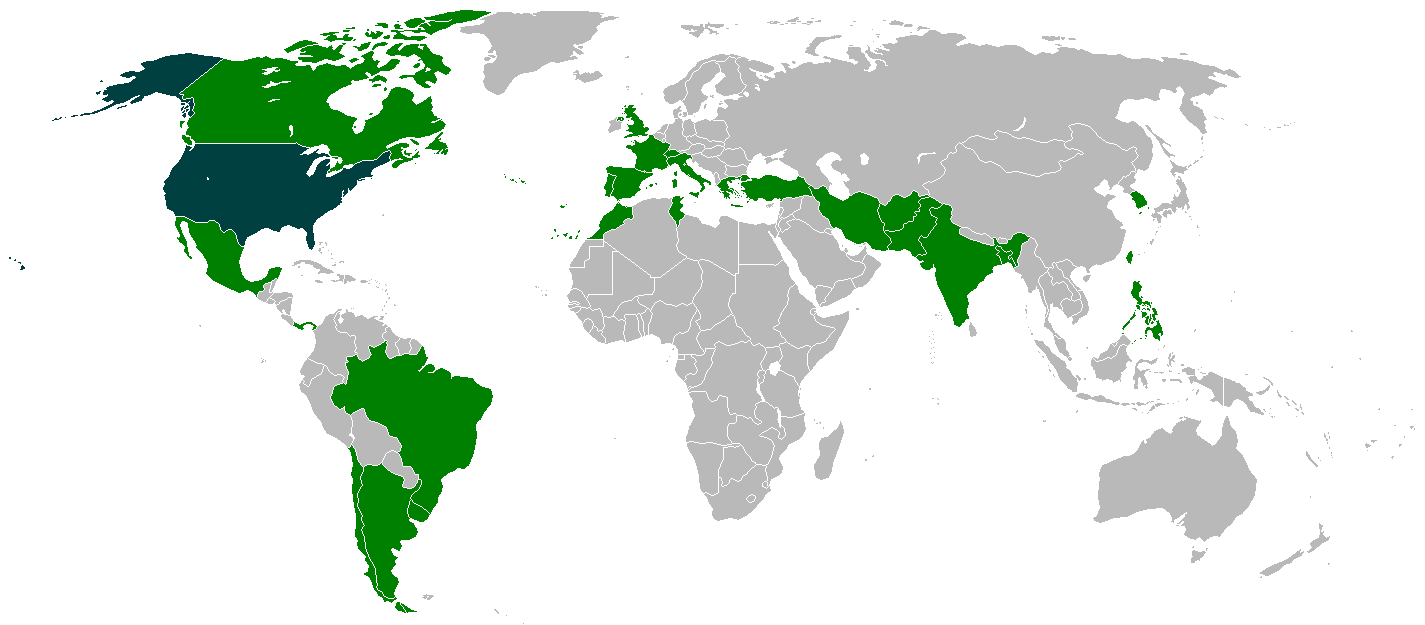
Eisenhower made sixteen international trips to 27 countries during his presidency.

	Dates	Country	Locations	Details
1	December 2–5, 1952	South Korea	Seoul	Visit to Korean combat zone. (Visit made as president-elect.)
2	October 19, 1953	Mexico	Nueva Ciudad Guerrero	Dedication of Falcon Dam, with President Adolfo Ruiz Cortines.
3	November 13–15, 1953	Canada	Ottawa	State visit. Met with Governor General Vincent Massey and Prime Minister Louis St. Laurent. Addressed Parliament.
4	December 4–8, 1953	Bermuda	Hamilton	Attended the Bermuda Conference with Prime Minister Winston Churchill and French prime minister Joseph Laniel.
5	July 16–23, 1955	Switzerland	Geneva	Attended the Geneva Summit with British prime minister Anthony Eden, French premier Edgar Faure and Soviet premier Nikolai Bulganin.
6	July 21–23, 1956	Panama	Panama City	Attended the meeting of the presidents of the American republics.
7	March 20–24, 1957	Bermuda	Hamilton	Met with Prime Minister Harold Macmillan.
8	December 14–19, 1957	France	Paris	Attended the first NATO summit.
9	July 8–11, 1958	Canada	Ottawa	Informal visit. Met with Governor General Vincent Massey and Prime Minister John Diefenbaker. Addressed Parliament.
10	February 19–20, 1959	Mexico	Acapulco	Informal meeting with President Adolfo López Mateos.
11	June 26, 1959	Canada	Montreal	Joined Queen Elizabeth II in ceremony opening the St. Lawrence Seaway.
12	August 26–27, 1959	West Germany	Bonn	Informal meeting with Chancellor Konrad Adenauer and President Theodor Heuss.
12	August 27 – September 2, 1959	United Kingdom	London, Balmoral, Chequers	Informal visit. Met Prime Minister Harold Macmillan and Queen Elizabeth II.
12	September 2–4, 1959	France	Paris	Informal meeting with President Charles de Gaulle and Italian prime minister Antonio Segni. Addressed North Atlantic Council.
12	September 4–7, 1959	United Kingdom	Culzean Castle	Rested before returning to the United States.
13	December 4–6, 1959	Italy	Rome	Informal visit. Met with President Giovanni Gronchi.
13	December 6, 1959	Vatican City	Apostolic Palace	Audience with Pope John XXIII.
13	December 6–7, 1959	Turkey	Ankara	Informal visit. Met with President Celâl Bayar.
13	December 7–9, 1959	Pakistan	Karachi	Informal visit. Met with President Ayub Khan.
13	December 9, 1959	Afghanistan	Kabul	Informal visit. Met with King Mohammed Zahir Shah.
13	December 9–14, 1959	India	New Delhi, Agra	Met with President Rajendra Prasad and Prime Minister Jawaharlal Nehru. Addressed Parliament.
13	December 14, 1959	Iran	Tehran	Met with Shah Mohammad Reza Pahlavi and Prime Minister Manouchehr Eghbal; Addressed Parliament.
13	December 14–15, 1959	Greece	Athens	Official visit. Met with King Paul and Prime Minister Konstantinos Karamanlis. Addressed Parliament.
13	December 17, 1959	Tunisia	Tunis	Met with President Habib Bourguiba.
13	December 18–21, 1959	France	Toulon, Paris	Conference with President Charles de Gaulle, British prime minister Harold Macmillan and West German chancellor Konrad Adenauer.
13	December 21–22, 1959	Spain	Madrid	Met with Generalissimo Francisco Franco.
13	December 22, 1959	Morocco	Casablanca	Met with King Mohammed V.
14	February 23–26, 1960	Brazil	Brasília, Rio de Janeiro, São Paulo	Met with President Juscelino Kubitschek. Addressed Brazilian Congress.
14	February 26–29, 1960	Argentina	Buenos Aires, Mar del Plata, San Carlos de Bariloche	Met with President Arturo Frondizi.
14	February 29 – March 2, 1960	Chile	Santiago	Met with President Jorge Alessandri.
14	March 2–3, 1960	Uruguay	Montevideo	Met with President Benito Nardone. Returned to the U.S. via Buenos Aires and Suriname.
15	May 15–19, 1960	France	Paris	Conference with President Charles de Gaulle, British prime minister Harold Macmillan and Soviet premier Nikita Khrushchev.
15	May 19–20, 1960	Portugal	Lisbon	Official visit. Met with President Américo Tomás.
16	June 14–16, 1960	Philippines	Manila	State visit. Met with President Carlos P. Garcia.
16	June 18–19, 1960	Republic of China (Formosa/Taiwan)	Taipei	State visit. Met with President Chiang Kai-shek.
16	June 19–20, 1960	South Korea	Seoul	Met with Prime Minister Heo Jeong. Addressed the National Assembly.
17	October 24, 1960	Mexico	Ciudad Acuña	Informal visit. Met with President Adolfo López Mateos.

== Domestic affairs ==
=== Modern Republicanism ===
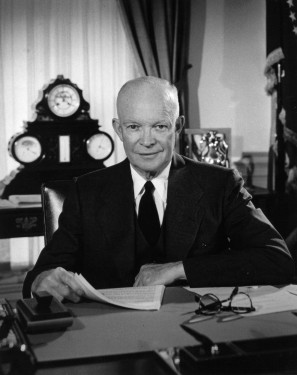
Eisenhower in the Oval Office, February 29, 1956.

Eisenhower's approach to politics was described by contemporaries as "modern Republicanism", which occupied a middle ground between the liberalism of the New Deal and the conservatism of the Old Guard of the Republican Party. A strong performance in the 1952 elections gave Republicans narrow majorities in both chambers of the 83rd United States Congress. Led by Taft, the conservative faction introduced numerous bills to reduce the federal government's role in American life. Although Eisenhower favored some reduction of the federal government's functions and had strongly opposed President Truman's Fair Deal, he supported the continuation of Social Security and other New Deal programs that he saw as beneficial for the common good. Eisenhower presided over a reduction in domestic spending and reduced the government's role in subsidizing agriculture through passage of the Agricultural Act of 1954, but he did not advocate for the abolition of major New Deal programs such as Social Security or the Tennessee Valley Authority, and these programs remained in place throughout his tenure as president.

Republicans lost control of Congress in the 1954 mid-term elections, and they would not regain control of either chamber until well after Eisenhower left office. Eisenhower's largely nonpartisan stance enabled him to work smoothly with the speaker of the House, Sam Rayburn, and Senate majority leader Lyndon Johnson. Eisenhower was the last President to veto over 100 bills and only two of these vetoes were overridden, both towards the end of his second term. Though liberal members of Congress like Hubert Humphrey and Paul Douglas favored expanding federal aid to education, implementing a national health insurance system, and directing federal assistance to impoverished areas, Rayburn and Johnson largely accepted Eisenhower's relatively conservative domestic policies. In his own party, Eisenhower maintained strong support with moderates, but he frequently clashed with conservative members of Congress, especially over foreign policy. Biographer Jean Edward Smith describes the relationship between Rayburn, Johnson, and Eisenhower:

Ike, LBJ, and "Mr. Sam" did not trust one another completely and they did not see eye to eye on every issue, but they understood one another and had no difficulty working together. Eisenhower continued to meet regularly with the Republican leadership. But his weekly sessions with Rayburn and Johnson, usually in the evening, over drinks, were far more productive. For Johnson and Rayburn, it was shrewd politics to cooperate with Ike. Eisenhower was wildly popular in the country....By supporting a Republican president against the Old Guard of his own party, the Democrats hoped to share Ike's popularity.

=== Fiscal policy and the economy ===
Federal finances and GDP during Eisenhower's presidency
Fiscal Year	Receipts	Outlays	Surplus/ Deficit	GDP	Debt as a % of GDP
1953	69.6	76.1	−6.5	382.1	57.2
1954	69.7	70.9	−1.2	387.2	58.0
1955	65.5	68.4	−3.0	406.3	55.8
1956	74.6	70.6	3.9	438.3	50.7
1957	80.0	76.6	3.4	463.4	47.3
1958	79.6	82.4	−2.8	473.5	47.8
1959	79.2	92.1	−12.8	504.6	46.5
1960	92.5	92.2	0.3	534.3	44.3
1961	94.4	97.7	−3.3	546.6	43.6
Ref.					

Eisenhower was a fiscal conservative whose policy views were close to those of Taft— they agreed that a free enterprise economy should run itself. Nonetheless, throughout Eisenhower's presidency, the top marginal tax rate was 91 percent—among the highest in American history. When Republicans gained control of both houses of the Congress following the 1952 election, conservatives pressed the president to support tax cuts. Eisenhower however, gave a higher priority to balancing the budget, refusing to cut taxes "until we have in sight a program of expenditure that shows that the factors of income and outgo will be balanced." Eisenhower kept the national debt low and inflation near zero; three of his eight budgets had a surplus.

Eisenhower built on the New Deal in a manner that embodied his thoughts on efficiency and cost-effectiveness. As president, Eisenhower believed the federal government had a role in supporting public welfare programs. His administration enacted laws to broaden Social Security coverage (extending benefits to around 10 million additional Americans), raise the federal minimum wage ($0.75 to $1.00 an hour), and establish the Department of Health, Education, and Welfare. While he backed initiatives like low-income housing, he generally advocated for more restrained federal spending compared to his predecessor, Harry Truman. In a private letter, Eisenhower wrote:

Should any party attempt to abolish social security and eliminate labor laws and farm programs, you would not hear of that party again in our political history. There is a tiny splinter group of course, that believes you can do these things [...] Their number is negligible and they are stupid.

The 1950s were a period of economic expansion in the United States, and the gross national product jumped from $355.3 billion in 1950 to $487.7 billion in 1960. Unemployment rates were also generally low, except for in 1958. There were three recessions during Eisenhower's administration—July 1953 through May 1954, August 1957 through April 1958, and April 1960 through February 1961, caused by the Federal Reserve clamping down too tight on the money supply in an effort to wring out lingering wartime inflation. Meanwhile, federal spending as a percentage of GDP fell from 20.4 to 18.4 percent—there has not been a decline of any size in federal spending as a percentage of GDP during any administration since. Defense spending declined from $50.4 billion in fiscal year 1953 to $40.3 billion in fiscal year 1956, but then rose to $46.6 billion in fiscal year 1959. Although defense spending declined compared to the final years of the Truman administration, defense spending under Eisenhower remained much higher than it had been prior to the Korean War and consistently made up at least ten percent of the U.S. gross domestic product. The stock market performed very well while Eisenhower was in the White House, with the Dow Jones Industrial Average more than doubling (from 288 to 634), and personal income increased by 45 percent. Due to low-cost government loans, the introduction of the credit card, and other factors, total private debt (not including corporations) grew from $104.8 billion in 1950 to $263.3 billion in 1960.

=== Immigration ===
During the early 1950s, ethnic groups in the United States mobilized to liberalize the admission of refugees from Europe who had been displaced by war and the Iron Curtain. The result was the Refugee Relief Act of 1953, which permitted the admission of 214,000 immigrants to the United States from European countries between 1953 and 1956, over and above existing immigration quotas. The old quotas were quite small for Italy and Eastern Europe, but those areas received priority in the new law. The 60,000 Italians were the largest of the refugee groups. Despite the arrival of the refugees, the percentage of foreign-born individuals continued to drop, as the pre-1914 arrivals died out, falling to 5.4% in 1960. The percentage of native-born individuals with at least one foreign-born parent also fell to a new low, at 13.4 percent.

Responding to public outcry, primarily from California, about the perceived costs of services for illegal immigrants from Mexico, the president charged Joseph Swing, Director of the U.S. Immigration and Naturalization Service, with the task of regaining control of the border. On June 17, 1954, Swing launched Operation Wetback, the roundup and deportation of undocumented immigrants in selected areas of California, Arizona, and Texas. The U.S. Border Patrol later reported that over 1.3 million people (a number viewed by many to be inflated) were deported or left the U.S. voluntarily under the threat of deportation in 1954. Meanwhile, the number of Mexicans immigrating legally from Mexico grew rapidly during this period, from 18,454 in 1953 to 65,047 in 1956.

=== McCarthyism ===
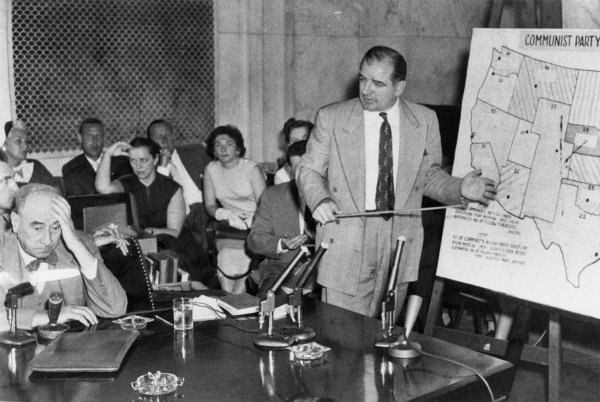
Joseph N. Welch (left) being questioned by U.S. senator Joseph McCarthy (right), June 9, 1954.

With the onset of the Cold War, the House of Representatives established the House Un-American Activities Committee to investigate alleged disloyal activities, and a new Senate committee made Senator Joseph McCarthy of Wisconsin a national leader and namesake of the anti-Communist movement. Though McCarthy remained a popular figure when Eisenhower took office, his constant attacks on the State Department and the Army, and his reckless disregard for due process, offended many Americans. Privately, Eisenhower held McCarthy and his tactics in contempt, writing, "I despise [McCarthy's tactics], and even during the political campaign of '52 I not only stated publicly (and privately to him) that I disapproved of those methods, but I did so in his own State." Eisenhower's reluctance to publicly oppose McCarthy drew criticism even from many of Eisenhower's own advisers, but the president worked incognito to weaken the popular senator from Wisconsin. In early 1954, after McCarthy escalated his investigation into the Army, Eisenhower moved against McCarthy by releasing a report indicating that McCarthy had pressured the Army to grant special privileges to an associate, G. David Schine. Eisenhower also refused to allow members of the executive branch to testify in the Army–McCarthy hearings, contributing to the collapse of those hearings. Following those hearings, Senator Ralph Flanders introduced a successful measure to censure McCarthy; Senate Democrats voted unanimously for the censure, while half of the Senate Republicans voted for it. The censure ended McCarthy's status as a major player in national politics, and he died of liver failure in 1957.

Though he disagreed with McCarthy on tactics, Eisenhower considered Communist infiltration to be a serious threat, and he authorized department heads to dismiss employees if there was cause to believe those employees might be disloyal to the United States. Under the direction of Dulles, the State Department purged over 500 employees. With Eisenhower's approval, the Federal Bureau of Investigation (FBI) stepped up domestic surveillance efforts, establishing COINTELPRO in 1956. In 1957, the Supreme Court handed down a series of decisions that bolstered constitutional protections and curbed the power of the Smith Act, resulting in a decline of prosecutions of suspected Communists during the late 1950s.

In 1953, Eisenhower refused to commute the death sentences of Julius and Ethel Rosenberg, two U.S. citizens who were convicted in 1951 of providing nuclear secrets to the Soviet Union. This provoked a worldwide outburst of picketing and demonstrations in favor of the Rosenbergs, along with editorials in otherwise pro-American newspapers and a plea for clemency from the pope. Eisenhower, supported by public opinion and the media at home, ignored the overseas demand. The Rosenbergs were executed via electric chair in July 1953.

Among Eisenhower's objectives in not directly confronting McCarthy was to prevent McCarthy from dragging the Atomic Energy Commission (AEC) into McCarthy's witch hunt for communists, which might interfere with the AEC's work on hydrogen bombs and other weapons programs. In December 1953, Eisenhower learned that one of America's nuclear scientists, J. Robert Oppenheimer, had been accused of being a spy for the Soviet Union. Although Eisenhower never really believed that these allegations were true, in January 1954 he ordered that "a blank wall" be placed between Oppenheimer and all defense-related activities. The Oppenheimer security hearing was conducted later that year, resulting in the physicist losing his security clearance. The matter was controversial at the time and remained so in later years, with Oppenheimer achieving a certain martyrdom. The case would reflect poorly on Eisenhower as well, but the president had never examined it in any detail and had instead relied excessively upon the advice of his subordinates, especially that of AEC chairman Lewis Strauss.

=== Civil rights ===
==== First term ====
In the 1950s, African Americans in the South faced mass disenfranchisement and racially segregated schools, bathrooms, and drinking fountains. Even outside of the South, African Americans faced employment discrimination, housing discrimination, and high rates of poverty and unemployment. Civil rights had emerged as a major national and global issue in the 1940s, partly due to the negative example set by Nazi Germany. Segregation damaged relations with African countries, undercut U.S. calls for decolonization, and emerged as a major theme in Soviet propaganda. After General Eisenhower had desegregated Army units in the European Theater of Operations in 1944, President Truman continued the process of desegregating the Armed Forces in 1948, but actual implementation had been slow. Southern Democrats strongly resisted integration, and many Southern leaders had endorsed Eisenhower in 1952 after the latter indicated his opposition to federal efforts to compel integration.

Upon taking office, Eisenhower moved quickly to end resistance to desegregation of the military by using government control of spending to compel compliance from military officials. "Wherever federal funds are expended," he told reporters in March, "I do not see how any American can justify a discrimination in the expenditure of those funds." Later, when Secretary of the Navy Robert B. Anderson stated in a report, "The Navy must recognize the customs and usages prevailing in certain geographic areas of our country which the Navy had no part in creating," Eisenhower responded, "We have not taken and we shall not take a single backward step. There must be no second class citizens in this country." Eisenhower also sought to end discrimination in federal hiring and in Washington, D.C., facilities. Despite these actions, Eisenhower continued to resist becoming involved in the expansion of voting rights, the desegregation of public education, or the eradication of employment discrimination. E. Frederic Morrow, the lone black member of the White House staff, met only occasionally with Eisenhower, and was left with the impression that Eisenhower had little interest in understanding the lives of African Americans. Thomas Borstelmann later reinforced this assessment of Eisenhower's character, detailing how Eisenhower had a limited personal commitment to the civil rights movement. Borstelmann also explains that due to his concerns about how the race situation would reflect on the US in the context of the Cold War, Eisenhower did support some reforms, but they were often cautious. Derek Catsam argues how this weak commitment explains why President Eisenhower did not speak out against racism as much as the political environment may have allowed, especially after the Brown vs Board of Education ruling.

On May 17, 1954, the Supreme Court handed down its landmark ruling in Brown v. Board of Education, declaring state laws establishing separate public schools for black and white students to be unconstitutional. Right before the decision passed, Eisenhower's Department of Justice filed an amicus brief in favor of desegregation in the landmark case. Nevertheless, Eisenhower told Chief Justice Earl Warren, in private, that "These [southern whites] are not bad people. All they are concerned about is to see that their sweet little girls are not required to sit in school alongside some big overgrown Negroes." After the decision, Eisenhower condemned the Supreme Court's holding, in private, stating that he believed it "set back progress in the South at least fifteen years." The president's public response promised to enforce the decision, but he did not praise the decision, saying "The Supreme Court has spoken and I am sworn to uphold the constitutional processes in this country and I will obey." Over the succeeding six years of his presidency, author Robert Caro notes, Eisenhower would never "publicly support the ruling; not once would he say that Brown was morally right". His silence left civil rights leaders with the impression that Eisenhower did not care much about the day-to-day plight of blacks in America, and it served as a source of encouragement for segregationists vowing to resist school desegregation. These segregationists conducted a campaign of "massive resistance", violently opposing those who sought to desegregate public education in the South. In 1956, most of Southern members of Congress signed the Southern Manifesto, which called for the overturning of Brown. Eisenhower's silence on the matter ties in to the idea of this being a 'Cold War Case', suggested by Dudziak, suggesting that Eisenhower's priority could have been protecting international reputation.

The Death of Emmett Till in 1955 was another landmark moment in the Civil Rights Movement. Following Emmett's death, his mother, Mamie Till, wrote to Eisenhower asking for support on the matter but received no response.

==== Second term ====
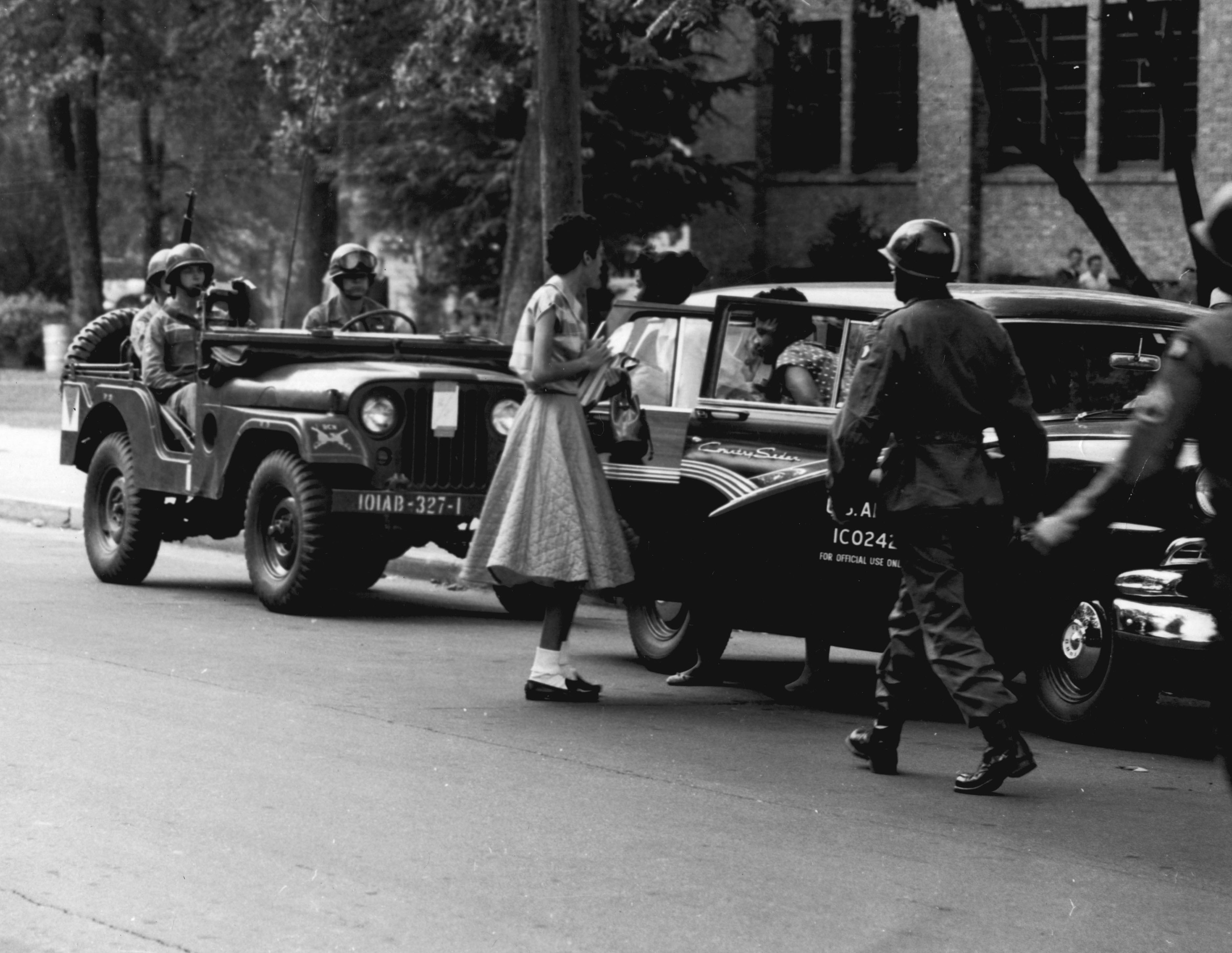
Soldiers from the 101st Airborne Division escort the Little Rock Nine to Central High School in Arkansas, September 1957

As Southern leaders continued to resist desegregation, Eisenhower sought to answer calls for stronger federal action by introducing a civil rights bill. The bill included provisions designed to increase the protection of African American voting rights; approximately 80% of African Americans were disenfranchised in the mid-1950s. The civil rights bill passed the House relatively easily, but faced strong opposition in the Senate from Southerners, and the bill passed only after many of its original provisions were removed. Though some black leaders urged him to reject the watered-down bill as inadequate, Eisenhower signed the Civil Rights Act of 1957 into law. It was the first federal law designed to protect African Americans since the end of Reconstruction. The act created the United States Commission on Civil Rights and established a civil rights division in the Justice Department, but it also required that defendants in voting rights cases receive a jury trial. The inclusion of the last provision made the act ineffectual, since white jurors in the South would not vote to convict defendants for interfering with the voting rights of African Americans.

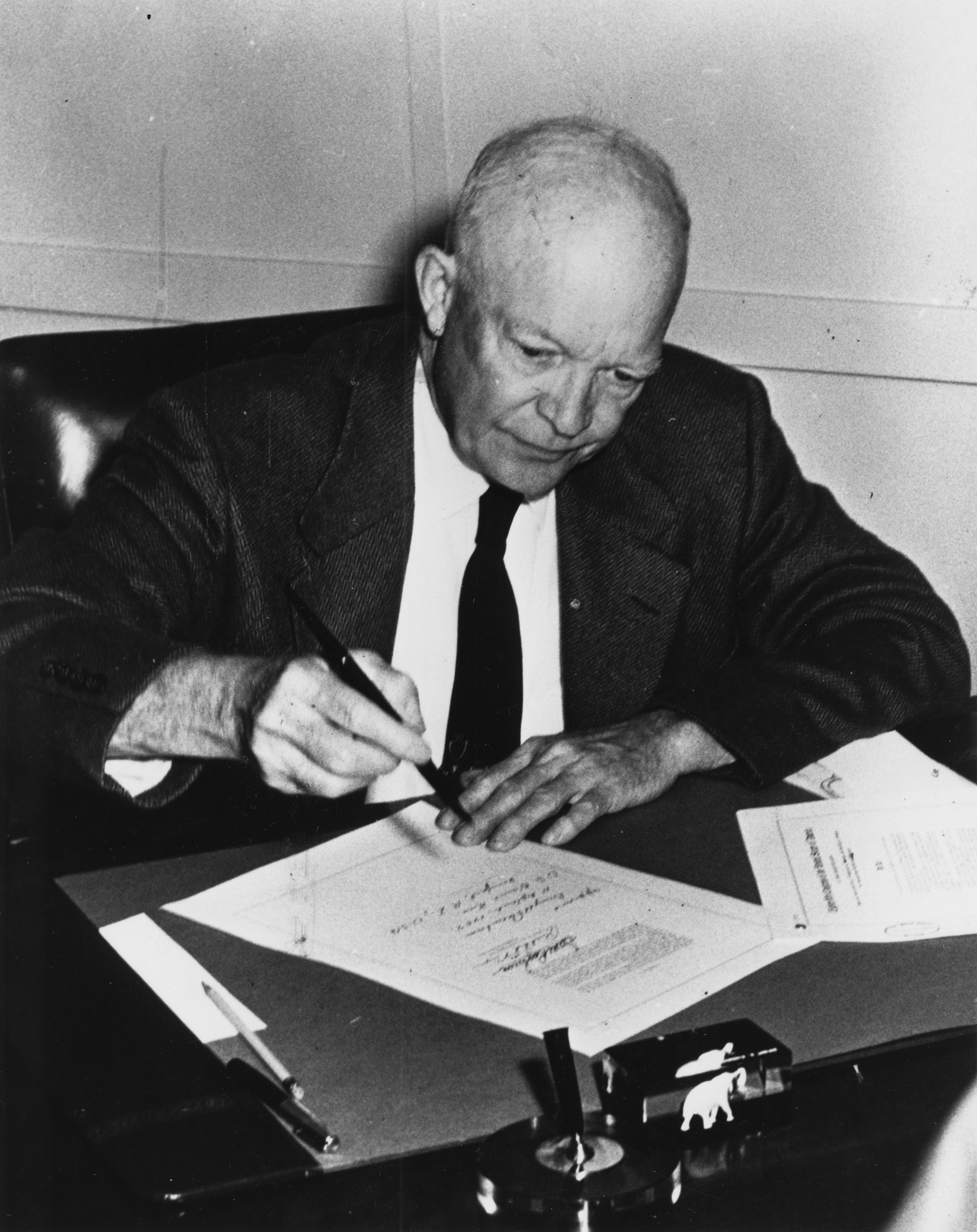
President Eisenhower signing the Civil Rights Act of 1957 on September 9, 1957

Eisenhower hoped that the passage of the Civil Rights Act would, at least temporarily, remove the issue of civil rights from the forefront of national politics, but events in Arkansas would force him into action. The school board of Little Rock, Arkansas created a federal court-approved plan for desegregation, with the program to begin implementation at Little Rock Central High School. Fearing that desegregation would complicate his re-election efforts, Governor Orval Faubus mobilized the National Guard to prevent nine black students, known as the "Little Rock Nine", from entering Central High. Though Eisenhower had not fully embraced the cause of civil rights, he was determined to uphold federal authority and to prevent an incident that could embarrass the United States on the international stage. The pressures of the Cold War were obviously on Eisenhower's mind, seen by his statement in a speech to the nation saying: 'Our enemies are gloating over this incident and using it everywhere to misrepresent our whole nation.' Mary L. Dudziak explains the importance of the Cold War in Eisenhower's decision to intervene in the Little Rock crisis. She argues that Eisenhower did not because of a belief in the principles of racial desegregation, but rather the impact that the crisis was having on US prestige abroad, and the way in which the Soviet Union was able to use it as propaganda. In addition to Faubus's refusal to withdraw the National Guard, a mob prevented the black students from attending Central High. In response, Eisenhower signed Executive order 10730, which federalized the Arkansas National Guard and ordered them to support the integration after which they protected the African American students in defiance of the Governor's command. Furthermore, Eisenhower also sent the Army into Little Rock, who also ensured that the Little Rock Nine could attend Central High. Defeated, Faubus derided Eisenhower's actions, claiming that Little Rock had become "occupied territory", and in 1958 he shut down all Little Rock high schools in retaliation, though the shutdown was temporary.

Towards the end of his second term, Eisenhower proposed another civil rights bill designed to help protect voting rights, but Congress once again passed a bill with weaker provisions than Eisenhower had requested. Eisenhower signed the bill into law as the Civil Rights Act of 1960. By 1960, 6.4% of Southern black students attended integrated schools and thousands of black voters had registered to vote, but millions of African Americans remained disenfranchised.

==== Lavender Scare ====
Eisenhower's administration contributed to the McCarthyist Lavender Scare with President Eisenhower issuing his Executive Order 10450 in 1953. During Eisenhower's presidency, thousands of lesbian and gay applicants were barred from federal employment and over 5,000 federal employees were fired under suspicions of being homosexual. From 1947 to 1961, the number of firings based on sexual orientation were far greater than those for membership in the Communist party, and government officials intentionally campaigned to make "homosexual" synonymous with "Communist traitor" such that they were treated as a national security threat stemming from the belief they were susceptible to blackmail and exploitation. As Ellen Schrecker argues, when the Cold War began to heat up, due to events like the outbreak of the Korean War, it provided justification for more pervasive and aggressive anti-Communist campaigns. The cover of Cold War security threats provided space for figures like McCarthy to promote increased government intervention. David Johnson explains how the Lavender Scare fits into this framework, arguing that homosexuals became victims of the widened definition of a security threat, at a time when Americans were becoming increasingly alarmed of both internal and external threats.

=== Atoms for Peace ===
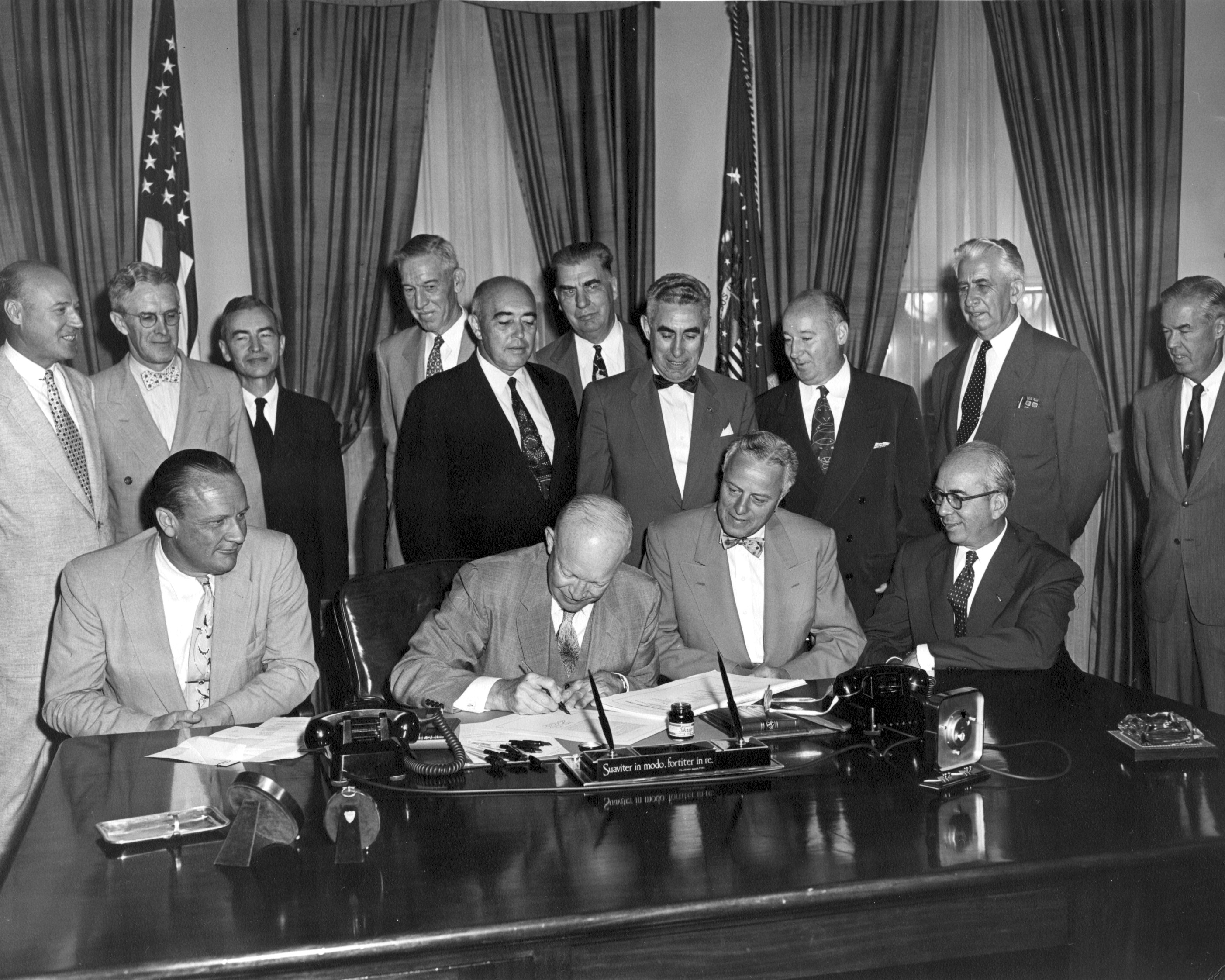
Eisenhower signs the Atomic Energy Act of 1954

Eisenhower gave the Atoms for Peace speech to the United Nations General Assembly on December 8, 1953, advocating for constructive use of nuclear fission for electrical energy and nuclear medicine instead of nuclear arms race proliferation. The speech lead to the Atomic Energy Act of 1954 which allowed the civilian world to develop nuclear fission technology for peaceful and prosperous purposes.

=== Infrastructure ===
==== Interstate Highway System ====
Remarks in Cadillac Square, Detroit
President Eisenhower delivered remarks about the need for a new highway program at Cadillac Square in Detroit on October 29, 1954
Text of speech excerpt

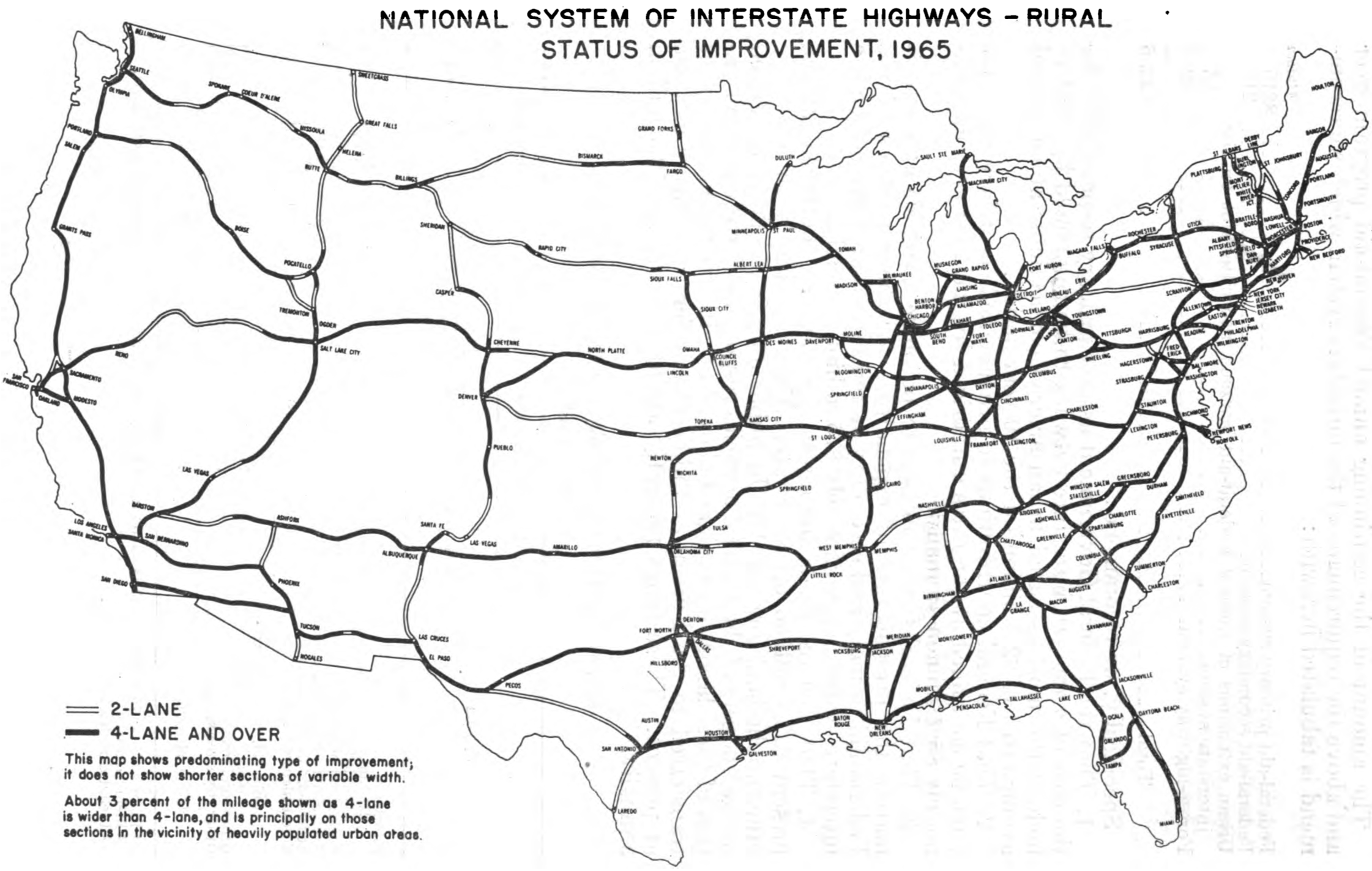
1955 map: The planned status of U.S. Highways in 1965, as a result of the developing Interstate Highway System

One of Eisenhower's most enduring achievements was the Interstate Highway System, which Congress authorized through the Federal Aid Highway Act of 1956. Historian James T. Patterson describes the act as the "only important law" passed during Eisenhower's first term aside from the expansion of Social Security. In 1954, Eisenhower appointed General Lucius D. Clay to head a committee charged with proposing an interstate highway system plan. The president's support for the project was influenced by his experiences as a young Army officer crossing the country as part of the 1919 Army Convoy. Summing up motivations for the construction of such a system, Clay stated,

It was evident we needed better highways. We needed them for safety, to accommodate more automobiles. We needed them for defense purposes, if that should ever be necessary. And we needed them for the economy. Not just as a public works measure, but for future growth.

Clay's committee proposed a 10-year, $100 billion program, which would build 40,000 miles of divided highways linking all American cities with a population of greater than 50,000. Eisenhower initially preferred a system consisting of toll roads, but Clay convinced Eisenhower that toll roads were not feasible outside of the highly populated coastal regions. In February 1955, Eisenhower forwarded Clay's proposal to Congress. The bill quickly won approval in the Senate, but House Democrats objected to the use of public bonds as the means to finance construction. Eisenhower and the House Democrats agreed to instead finance the system through the Highway Trust Fund, which itself would be funded by a gasoline tax.

In long-term perspective the Interstate Highway System was a remarkable success, that has done much to sustain Eisenhower's positive reputation. In larger cities poor rental neighborhoods were paved over—the land owners were compensated but not the black and poor white residents. Otherwise the system has been well received in retrospect. As the nation's rail system for passengers collapsed, the new highways created opportunities for city workers to commute from suburbia and delivery trucks to reach towns remote from the rail net. Suburbs became even more attractive as thousands of new subdivisions provided better schools and larger, cheaper housing than was available in the overcrowded central cities. Shopping malls were invented around 1960, and flourished for a half century. Tourism dramatically expanded as well, creating a demand for more service stations, motels, restaurants and visitor attractions. There was much more long-distance movement to the Sunbelt for winter vacations, or for permanent relocation. In rural areas, towns and small cities off the grid lost out as shoppers followed the interstate, and new factories were located where land was cheap, workers could drive instead of taking the city bus, and trucks were no longer slowed by clogged street traffic.

==== St. Lawrence Seaway ====
The Wiley-Dander Seaway Act, signed by President Eisenhower on May 13, 1954, authorized the U.S. government to work jointly with the government of Canada to create a deep-water 114-mile navigation channel in the St. Lawrence River between Montreal and Ogdensburg, New York. The St. Lawrence Seaway enabled large ships and tankers to sail directly from the Atlantic Ocean to Duluth, Minnesota on the Great Lakes. The completed seaway resulted in lower costs for shipping goods to and from the Midwest.

=== Space program and education ===
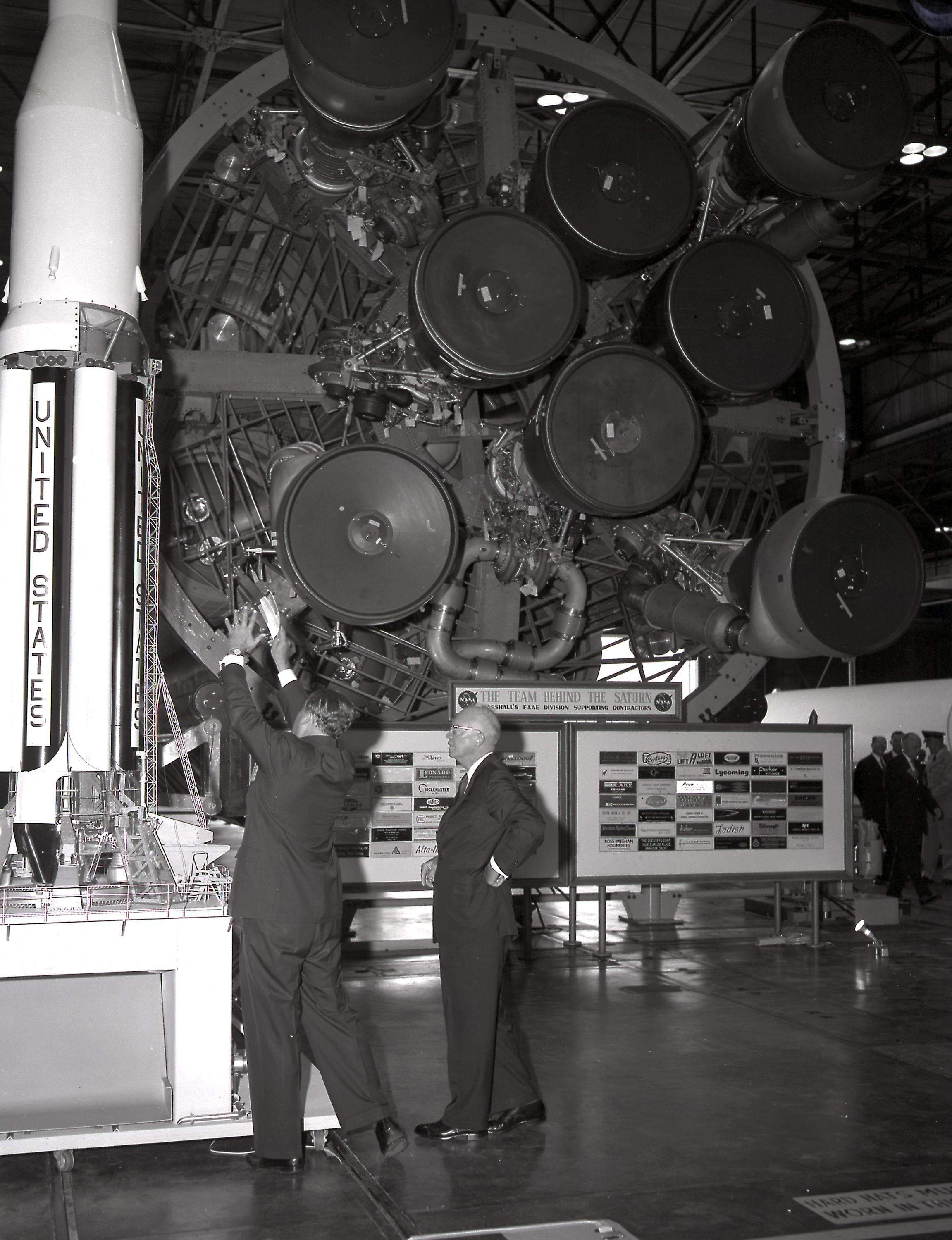
Wernher von Braun briefs President Eisenhower at the front of the S1 Stage (first Stage) of the Saturn I vehicle at the Marshall Space Flight Center (MSFC) on September 8, 1960.

In 1955, in separate announcements four days apart, both the United States and the Soviet Union publicly announced that they would launch artificial Earth satellites within the next few years. The July 29, announcement from the White House stated that the U.S. would launch "small Earth circling satellites" between July 1, 1957, and December 31, 1958, as part of the American contribution to the International Geophysical Year. Americans were astonished when October 4, 1957, the Soviet Union launched its Sputnik 1 satellite into orbit. Three months later, a nationally televised test of the American Vanguard TV3 missile failed in an embarrassing fashion; the missile was facetiously referred to as "Flopnik" and "Stay-putnik".

To many, the success of the Soviet satellite program suggested that the Soviet Union had made a substantial leap forward in technology that posed a serious threat to U.S. national security. While Eisenhower initially downplayed the gravity of the Soviet launch, public fear and anxiety about the perceived technological gap grew. Americans rushed to build nuclear bomb shelters, while the Soviet Union boasted about its new superiority as a world power. The president was, as British prime minister Harold Macmillan observed during a June 1958 visit to the U.S., "under severe attack for the first time" in his presidency. Economist Bernard Baruch wrote in an open letter to the New York Herald Tribune titled "The Lessons of Defeat": "While we devote our industrial and technological power to producing new model automobiles and more gadgets, the Soviet Union is conquering space. ... It is Russia, not the United States, who has had the imagination to hitch its wagon to the stars and the skill to reach for the moon and all but grasp it. America is worried. It should be."

The launch spurred a series of federal government initiatives ranging from defense to education. Renewed emphasis was placed on the Explorers program (which had earlier been supplanted by Project Vanguard) to launch an American satellite into orbit; this was accomplished on January 31, 1958, with the successful launch of Explorer 1. In February 1958, Eisenhower authorized formation of the Advanced Research Projects Agency, later renamed the Defense Advanced Research Projects Agency (DARPA), within the Department of Defense to develop emerging technologies for the U.S. military. The new agency's first major project was the Corona satellite, which was designed to replace the U-2 spy plane as a source of photographic evidence.

==== National Aeronautics and Space Administration (NASA) ====
In April 1958, Eisenhower asked Congress to pass legislation to create a civilian space agency to oversee the nation's space activities. On July 29, 1958, Eisenhower signed the National Aeronautics and Space Act of 1958 establishing the National Aeronautics and Space Administration (NASA). It represented a consensus that he forged among key interest groups, including scientists committed to basic research; the Pentagon which had to match the Soviet military achievement; corporate America looking for new business; and a strong new trend in public opinion looking up to space exploration. NASA took over the space technology research started by DARPA, as well as the Air Force's manned satellite program, Man In Space Soonest, which was renamed as Project Mercury. The project's first seven astronauts were announced on April 9, 1959.

==== National Defense Education Act ====
In September 1958, the president signed into law the National Defense Education Act, which provided $1 billion over 4 years to be infused into 40,000 loans, 40,000 scholarships, and 1,500 graduate fellowships. In 1953 the government spent $153 million, and colleges took $10 million of that funding; however, by 1960 the combined funding grew almost six-fold as a result. The legislation aimed to strengthen the nation's education system in response to national security concerns, with a focus on enhancing the United States' competitiveness with the Soviet Union in science and technology. Meanwhile, during the late 1950s and into the 1960s, NASA, the Department of Defense, and various private sector corporations developed multiple communications satellite research and development programs.

=== Labor unions ===
Union membership peaked in the mid-1950s, when unions consisted of about one-quarter of the total work force. The Congress of Industrial Organizations and the American Federation of Labor merged in 1955 to form the AFL–CIO, the largest federation of unions in the United States. Unlike some of his predecessors, AFL–CIO leader George Meany did not emphasize organizing unskilled workers and workers in the South. During the late 1940s and the 1950s, both the business community and local Republicans sought to weaken unions, partly because they played a major role in funding and campaigning for Democratic candidates. The Eisenhower administration also worked to consolidate the anti-union potential inherent in Taft–Hartley Act of 1947. Republicans sought to delegitimize unions by focusing on their shady activities, and the Justice Department, the Labor Department, and Congress all conducted investigations of criminal activity and racketeering in high-profile labor unions, especially the Teamsters Union. A select Senate committee, the McClellan Committee, was created in January 1957, and its hearings targeted Teamsters Union president Jimmy Hoffa as a public enemy. Public opinion polls showed growing distrust toward unions, and especially union leaders—or "labor bosses", as Republicans called them. The bipartisan Conservative Coalition, with the support of liberals such as the Kennedy brothers, won new congressional restrictions on organized labor in the 1959 Landrum-Griffin Act. The main impact of that act was to force more democracy on the previously authoritarian union hierarchies. However, in the 1958 elections, the unions fought back against state right-to-work laws and defeated many conservative Republicans.

=== Environmental issues ===
The environmental movement was starting to grow—it gained national stature by 1970. Liberals (and the Democratic Party) wanted national control of natural resources—the level at which organized ideological pressures were effective. Conservatives (and the Republican Party) wanted state or local control, whereby the financial benefit of local businesses could be decisive. In a debate going back to the early 20th century, preservationists wanted to protect the inherent natural beauty of the national parks, whereas economic maximizers wanted to build dams and divert water flows. Eisenhower articulated the conservative position in December 1953, declaring that conservation was not about "locking up and putting resources beyond the possibility of wastage or usage," but instead involved "the intelligent use of all the resources we have, for the welfare and benefit of all the American people." Liberals and environmentalists mobilized against Secretary of the Interior Douglas McKay – a businessman with little knowledge of nature. They alleged he promoted "giveaways" to mining companies regardless of environmental damage. They forced his resignation in 1956.

Eisenhower's personal activity on environmental issues came in foreign policy. He supported the Geneva Convention of 1958 that provided a strong foundation for international accords governing the use of the world's high seas, especially regarding fishing interests. Eisenhower also promoted the peaceful use of atomic energy for the production of electricity, with strong controls against diversion into nuclear weapons. However, there was little attention to nuclear waste.

Eisenhower signed the Air Pollution Control Act of 1955 which provided funds for federal research in air pollution. In 1956, Congress passed the Fish and Wildlife Act which authorizes the secretary of the interior to make decisions for the development, management, advancement, conservation and protection of fisheries resources and wildlife resources through research, acquisition of refuge lands, development of existing facilities and other means.

=== Mid-term elections of 1958 ===
The economy began to decline in mid-1957 and reached its nadir in early 1958. The Recession of 1958 was the worst economic downturn of Eisenhower's tenure, as the unemployment rate reached a high of 7.5%. The poor economy, Sputnik, the federal intervention in Little Rock, and a contentious budget battle all sapped Eisenhower's popularity, with Gallup polling showing that his approval rating dropped from 79 percent in February 1957 to 52 percent in March 1958. A controversy broke out in mid-1958 after a House subcommittee discovered that White House Chief of Staff Sherman Adams had accepted an expensive gift from Bernard Goldfine, textile manufacturer under investigation by the Federal Trade Commission (FTC). Adams denied the accusation that he had interfered with the FTC investigation on Goldfine's behalf, but Eisenhower forced him to resign in September 1958. As the 1958 mid-term elections approached, the Democrats attacked Eisenhower over the Space Race, the controversy relating to Adams, and other issues, but the biggest issue of the campaign was the economy, which had not yet fully recovered. Republicans suffered major defeats in the elections, as Democrats picked up over forty seats in the House and over ten seats in the Senate. Several leading Republicans, including Bricker and Senate Minority Leader William Knowland, lost their re-election campaigns.

=== Twenty-third Amendment ===
Under the original constitutional rules governing the Electoral College, presidential electors were apportioned to states only. As a result, the District of Columbia was excluded from the presidential election process. Several constitutional amendments to provide the district's citizens with appropriate rights of voting in national elections for president and vice president were introduced in Congress during the 1950s. Eisenhower was a persistent advocate for the voting rights of D.C. residents. On June 16, 1960, the 86th Congress approved a constitutional amendment extending the right to vote in presidential election to citizens residing in the District of Columbia by granting the district electors in the Electoral College, as if it were a state. After the requisite number state legislatures ratified the proposed amendment, it became the Twenty-third Amendment to the United States Constitution on March 29, 1961.

=== States admitted to the Union ===
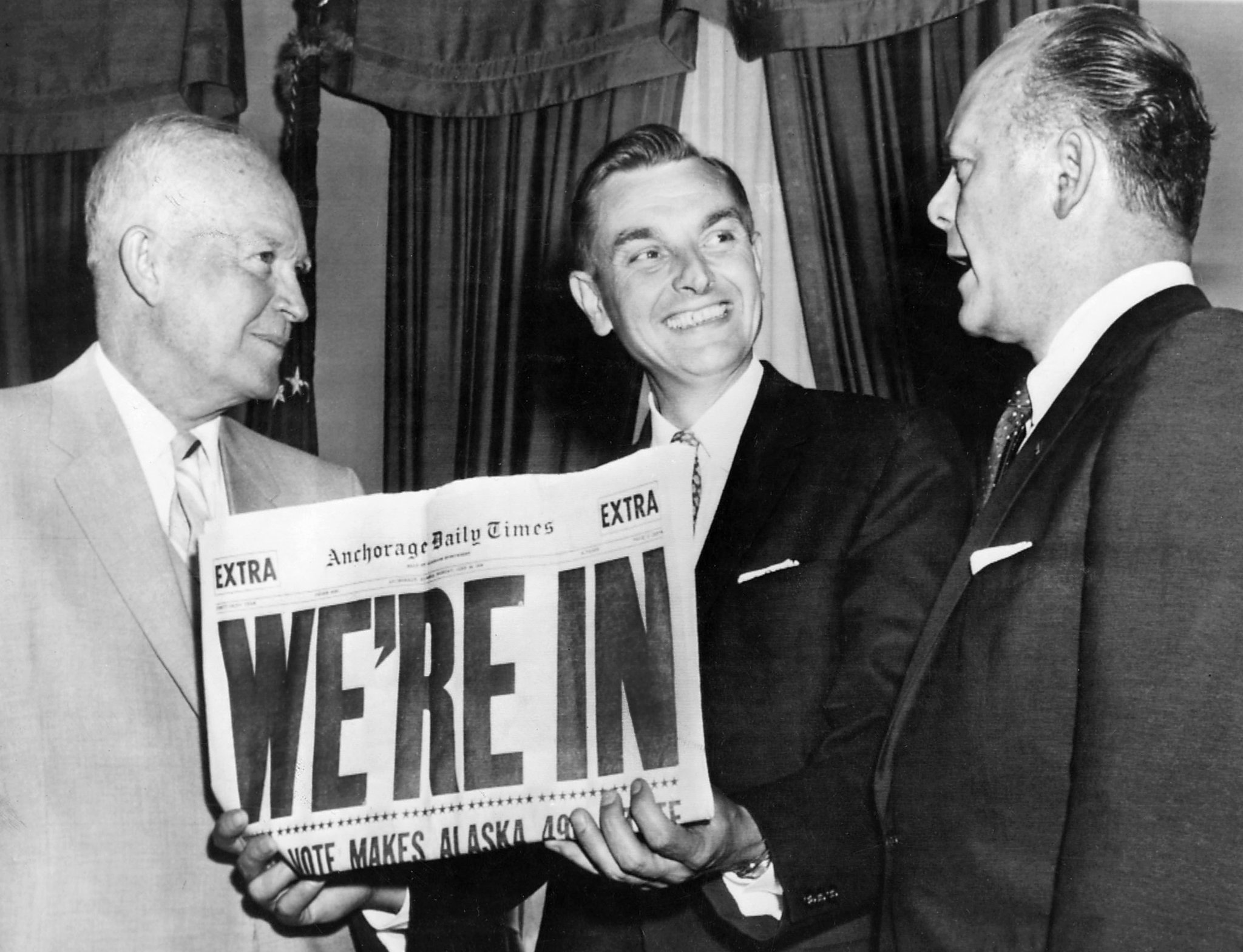
President Eisenhower, Mike Stepovich, and Fred A. Seaton celebrate Alaska statehood.

Eisenhower had called for the admission of Alaska and Hawaii as states during his 1952 campaign, but various issues delayed their statehood. Hawaii faced opposition from Southern members of Congress who objected to the island chain's large non-white population, while concerns about military bases in Alaska convinced Eisenhower to oppose statehood for the territory early in his tenure. In 1958, Eisenhower reached an agreement with Congress on a bill that provided for the admission of Alaska and set aside large portions of Alaska for military bases. Eisenhower signed the Alaska Statehood Act into law in July 1958, and Alaska became the 49th state on January 3, 1959. Months later on March 18, 1959, Eisenhower signed the Hawaii Admission Act, and Hawaii became the 50th state on August 21, 1959.

== Health issues ==
Eisenhower was the first president to release information about his health and medical records while in office. However, people around him covered up medical information that might hurt him politically by raising doubts about his good health. On September 24, 1955, while vacationing in Colorado, he had a serious heart attack. Howard Snyder, his personal physician, misdiagnosed the symptoms as indigestion, and failed to call in the help that was urgently needed. Snyder later falsified his own records to cover his blunder and to protect Eisenhower's need to project that he was healthy enough to do his job. The heart attack required six weeks' hospitalization, and Eisenhower did not resume his normal work schedule until early 1956. During Eisenhower's period of recuperation, Nixon, Dulles, and Sherman Adams assumed administrative duties and provided communication with the president. Eisenhower suffered a stroke in November 1957, but he quickly recovered. His health was generally good for the remainder of his second term.

== Elections during the Eisenhower presidency ==
Congressional party leaders
		Senate leaders		House leaders	
Congress	Year	Majority	Minority	Speaker	Minority
83rd	1953.01.03.-1953.07.31.	Taft	Johnson	Martin	Rayburn
83rd	1953.07.31–1955.01.03.	Knowland	Johnson	Martin	Rayburn
84th	1955.01.03.-1957.07.31.	Johnson	Knowland	Rayburn	Martin
85th	1957.01.03.-1959.07.31.	Johnson	Knowland	Rayburn	Martin
86th	1959.01.03.-1961.01.03.	Johnson	Dirksen	Rayburn	Halleck
87th	1961.01.03.-1961.11.16.	Mansfield	Dirksen	Rayburn	Halleck
87th	1961.11.16.-1963.01.03.	Mansfield	Dirksen	McCormack	Halleck

Congress	Senate	House
83rd	49	221
84th	47	203
85th	47	201
86th	34	153
87th (Note: A small portion of the 83rd Congress (January 3, 1953 – January 19, 1953) took place under President Truman, and only a small portion of the 87th Congress (January 3, 1961 – January 19, 1961) took place during Eisenhower's second term.)	36	175

=== 1954 mid-term elections ===
In the 1954 mid-term elections, Democrats took control of both houses of Congress.

=== 1956 re-election campaign ===
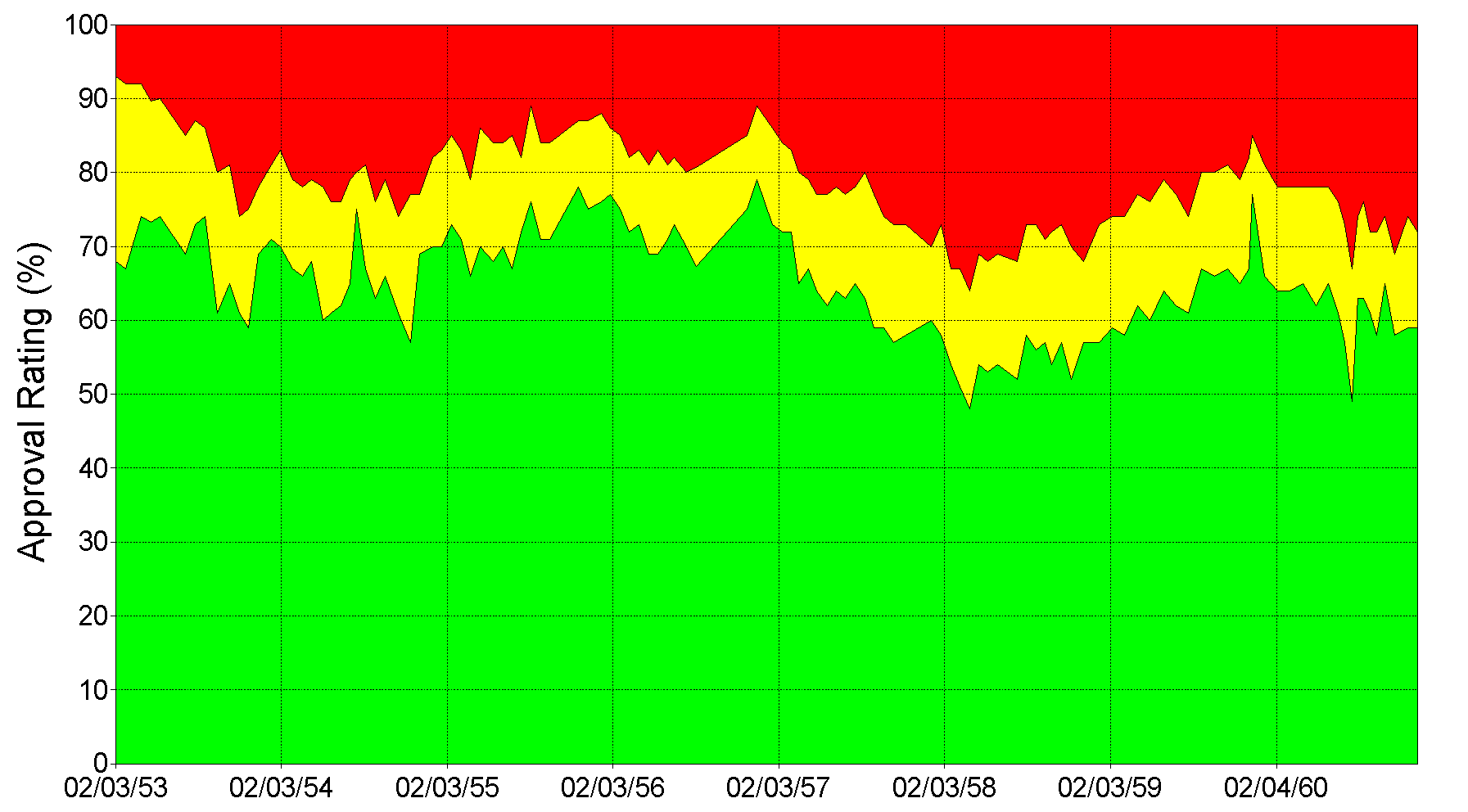
Graph of Eisenhower's Gallup approval ratings

In July 1955, Time Magazine lauded the president for bringing "prosperity to the nation", noting that, "In the 29 months since Dwight Eisenhower moved into the White House, a remarkable change has come over the nation. Blood pressure and temperature have gone down; nerve endings have healed over. The new tone could be described in a word: confidence." This sentiment was reflected by Eisenhower's Gallup poll approval rating, which ranged between 68 and 79 percent during his first term. Eisenhower's September 1955 heart attack engendered speculation about whether he would be able to seek a second term, but his doctor pronounced him fully recovered in February 1956, and soon thereafter Eisenhower announced his decision to run for reelection. Eisenhower had considered retiring after one term, but decided to run again in part because he viewed his potential successors from both parties as inadequate.

Eisenhower did not trust Nixon as able to lead the country if he acceded to the presidency, and he attempted to remove Nixon from the 1956 ticket by offering him the position of Secretary of Defense. Nixon declined the offer, and refused to take his name out of consideration for re-nomination unless Eisenhower demanded it. Unwilling to split the party, and unable to find the perfect replacement for Nixon, Eisenhower decided not to oppose Nixon's re-nomination. Though Harold Stassen and some other Republicans worked to coax someone to challenge Nixon, the vice president remained highly popular among the Republican leadership and rank-and-file voters. He was unanimously re-nominated at the 1956 Republican National Convention. Eisenhower, meanwhile, was renominated with no opposition.

President Eisenhower defeated Democrat Adlai Stevenson II in the 1956 presidential election

At the 1956 Democratic National Convention in Chicago, Illinois, Adlai Stevenson was renominated on the first ballot, despite a strong challenge from New York governor W. Averell Harriman, who was backed by former president Truman. Stevenson announced that he would leave the choice of the candidate for vice president to the convention; he gave no indication of who he would prefer to have for a running mate. Delegates chose Senator Estes Kefauver of Tennessee on the second ballot.

Eisenhower campaigned on his record of economic prosperity and his Cold War foreign policy. He also attacked Democrats for allegedly blocking his legislative programs and derided Stevenson's proposal to ban the testing of nuclear weapons. Stevenson called for an acceleration of disarmament talks with the Soviet Union and increased government spending on social programs. Democrats introduced the tactic of negative television ads, generally attacking Nixon rather than Eisenhower. The Suez Crisis and the Hungarian Revolution became the focus of Eisenhower's attention in the final weeks of the campaign, and his actions in the former crises boosted his popularity.

On election day, Eisenhower won by an even greater margin than he had four years earlier, taking 457 electoral votes to Stevenson's 73. He won over 57 percent of the popular vote, taking over 35 million votes. Eisenhower maintained his 1952 gains among Democrats, especially white urban Southerners and Northern Catholics, while the growing suburbs added to his Republican base. Compared to the 1952 election, Eisenhower gained Kentucky, Louisiana, and West Virginia, while losing Missouri. In interviews with pollsters, his voters were less likely to bring up his leadership record. Instead what stood out this time, "was the response to personal qualities— to his sincerity, his integrity and sense of duty, his virtue as a family man, his religious devotion, and his sheer likeableness." Eisenhower's victory did not provide a strong coattail effect for other Republican candidates, and Democrats retained control of Congress.

=== 1958 mid-term elections ===
In the 1958 mid-term elections, Democrats retained control of both houses of Congress.

=== 1960 election and transition ===
Democrat John F. Kennedy defeated Republican Richard Nixon in the 1960 presidential election.

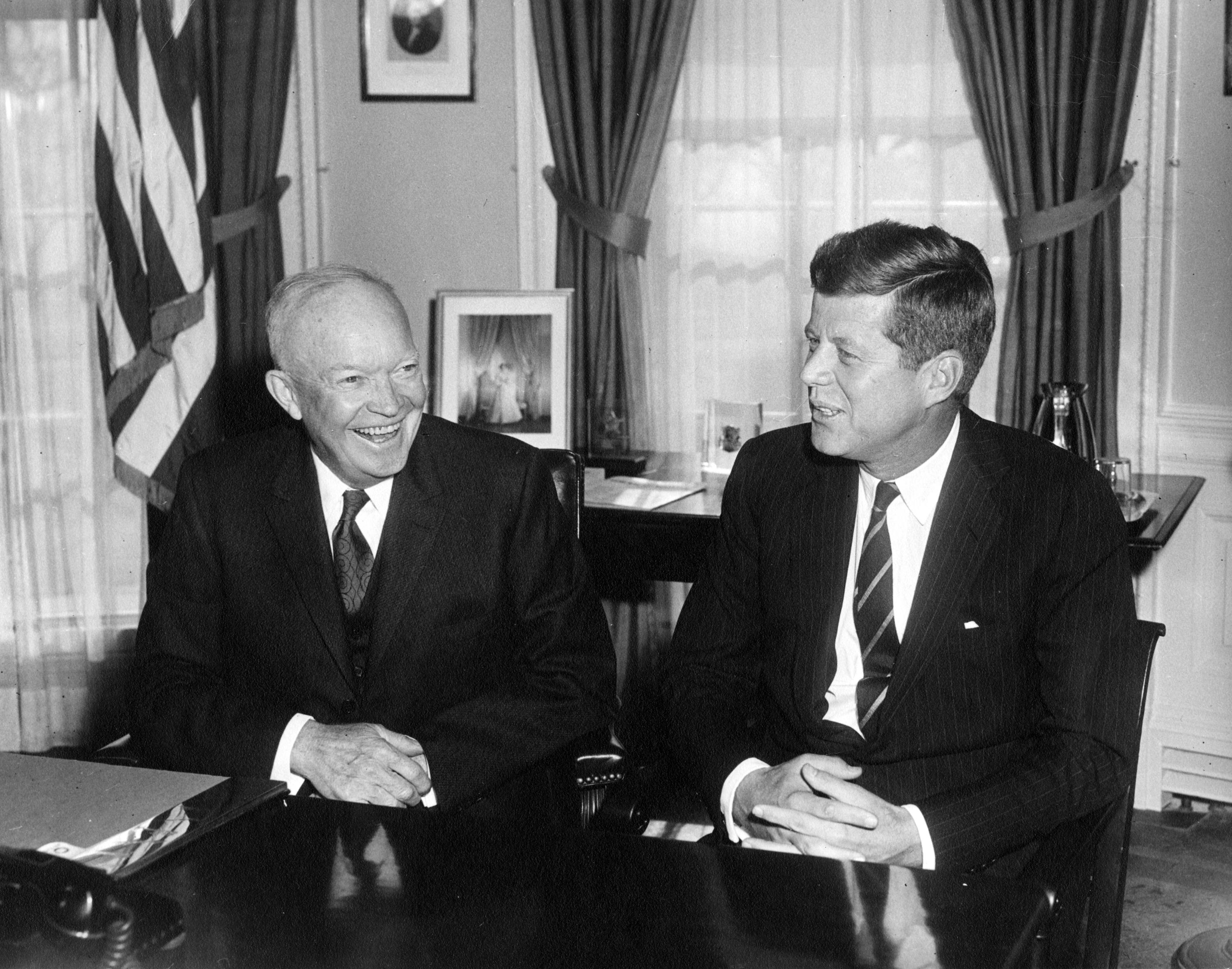
President Dwight D. Eisenhower and President-elect John F. Kennedy at the White House on December 6, 1960

The 22nd Amendment to the U.S. Constitution, ratified in 1951, established a two-term limit for the presidency. As the amendment had not applied to President Truman, Eisenhower became the first president constitutionally limited to two terms. Eisenhower nonetheless closely watched the 1960 presidential election, which he viewed as a referendum on his presidency. He attempted to convince Secretary of the Treasury Robert Anderson to seek the Republican nomination, but Anderson declined to enter the race. Eisenhower offered Nixon lukewarm support in the 1960 Republican primaries. When asked by reporters to list one of Nixon's policy ideas he had adopted, Eisenhower joked, "If you give me a week, I might think of one. I don't remember." Eisenhower and Nixon in fact had become unequal friends, but learned from and respected each other. Despite the lack of strong support from Eisenhower, Nixon's successful cultivation of party elites ensured that he faced only a weak challenge from Governor Nelson Rockefeller for the Republican nomination.

The 1960 campaign was dominated by the Cold War and the economy. John F. Kennedy become the Democratic nominee; to keep Southern Democrats he chose Johnson as his running mate. Kennedy alleged a serious "missile gap" and endorsed federal aid for education, an increased minimum wage, and the establishment of a federal health insurance program for the elderly. Nixon, meanwhile, wanted to win on his own, and did not take up Eisenhower's offers for help. To Eisenhower's great disappointment, Kennedy defeated Nixon in an extremely close election.

Eisenhower's farewell address, January 17, 1961. Length 15:30.

==== Farewell address ====
During the campaign, Eisenhower had privately lambasted Kennedy's inexperience and connections to political machines, but after the election he worked with Kennedy to ensure a smooth transition. He personally met twice with Kennedy, emphasizing especially the danger posed by Cuba. On January 17, 1961, Eisenhower gave his final televised Address to the Nation from the Oval Office. In his farewell address, Eisenhower raised the issue of the Cold War and role of the U.S. armed forces. He described the Cold War: "We face a hostile ideology global in scope, atheistic in character, ruthless in purpose and insidious in method ..." and warned about what he saw as unjustified government spending proposals and continued with a warning that "we must guard against the acquisition of unwarranted influence, whether sought or unsought, by the military–industrial complex." Eisenhower's address reflected his fear that military spending and the desire to ensure total security would be pursued to the detriment of other goals, including a sound economy, efficient social programs, and individual liberties.

== Historical reputation ==
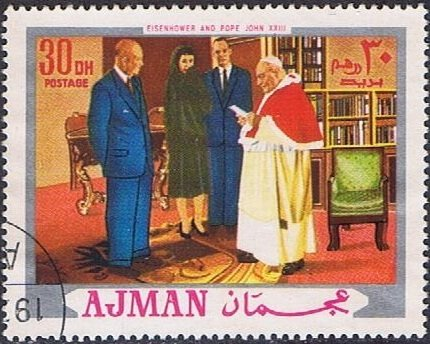
Stamp of Ajman - 1970 - Colnect 324576 - Eisenhower and Pope John XXIII

Eisenhower was popular among the general public when he left office, but for a decade or two commentators viewed Eisenhower as a "do-nothing" president who left many of the major decisions to his subordinates. Paul Holbo and Robert W. Sellen state that critics portrayed Eisenhower "typically with a golf club in his hand and a broad but vapid grin on his face. [...] [L]iberal intellectuals compared him unfavorably with their standard for president, Franklin D. Roosevelt. They gave 'Ike' especially low marks for his seeming aloofness from politics, his refusal to battle publicly with Senator Joseph McCarthy, and his reluctance to assume active party leadership."

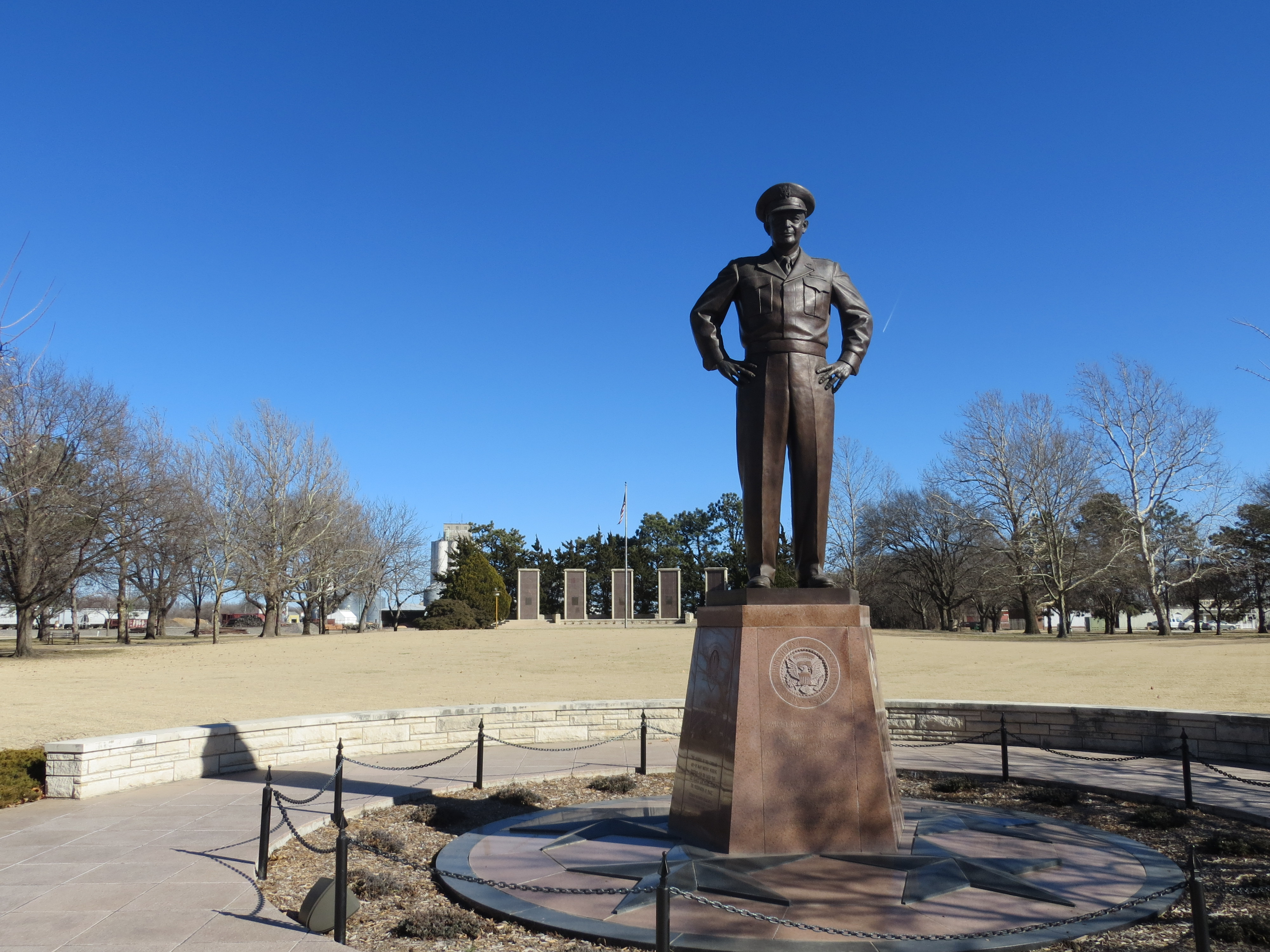
Dwight D. Eisenhower statue in "Champion of Peace" circle in Abilene, Kansas

Historians writing in the 1960s were negative on Eisenhower's foreign policy, seeing "the popular general as an amiable but bumbling leader who presided over the 'great postponement' of critical national and international issues during the 1950s." Historians obtained access for the first time to Eisenhower's private papers in the 1970s, leaving historians "virtually unanimous in applauding Ike's consistent exercise of mature judgment, prudence, and restraint and in celebrating his signal accomplishment of maintaining peace and during unusually perilous periods in international relations." Liberal historian Arthur Schlesinger, Jr. a staunch supporter of Adlai Stevenson at the time, had his eyes opened: "the Eisenhower papers...unquestionably alter the old picture....Eisenhower showed much more energy, interest, self-confidence, purpose, cunning, and command than many of us supposed in the 1950s."

Eisenhower's reputation peaked in the early 1980s; by 1985 a postrevisionist reaction had set in, and a more complex assessment of the Eisenhower administration was being presented. The new factor was the availability of previously closed records and papers showed that Eisenhower shrewdly maneuvered behind the scenes, avoiding controversial issues while retaining control of his administration. Historians have also noted the limits of some of Eisenhower's achievements; he avoided taking strong public stances on McCarthyism or civil rights, and Cold War tensions were high at the end of his presidency. Recent polls of historians and political scientists have generally ranked Eisenhower in the top quartile of presidents. A 2018 poll of the American Political Science Association's Presidents and Executive Politics section ranked Eisenhower as the seventh best president. A 2017 C-SPAN poll of historians ranked Eisenhower as the fifth best president.

Historian John Lewis Gaddis has summarized the turnaround in evaluations:

Historians long ago abandoned the view that Eisenhower's was a failed presidency. He did, after all, end the Korean War without getting into any others. He stabilized, and did not escalate, the Soviet-American rivalry. He strengthened European alliances while withdrawing support from European colonialism. He rescued the Republican Party from isolationism and McCarthyism. He maintained prosperity, balanced the budget, promoted technological innovation, facilitated (if reluctantly) the civil rights movement and warned, in the most memorable farewell address since Washington's, of a "military–industrial complex" that could endanger the nation's liberties. Not until Reagan would another president leave office with so strong a sense of having accomplished what he set out to do.

=== Creativity as president ===
Eisenhower formed a love for painting throughout his life. His first inspiration was in the portrait of Mamie Eisenhower by Thomas E. Stephens and the artwork of his friend Winston Churchill, which led him to create his own art. With more personal time after World War II, he tried to copy the portrait by Stephens. Having believed painting was a "sheer waste of money", he continued his own painting after being given a painting set and not wanting to waste that money. The reluctant hobby gradually became a place of enjoyment, most often in creating copies of pictures, portraits, or magazine images. Eisenhower enjoyed the process of making the painting rather than the end goal it produced and often gave his work away rather than keeping it. He described most of his paintings as "daub" – something clumsy and crude – though he did not lack talent. His drive to accomplish ensured that his paintings were above average. In his later life he preferred painting landscapes, primarily hills, and it became a favorite past time. Eisenhower's paintings remain a historical representation of him as a multifaceted man.
