= Council on Foreign Economic Policy =

The U.S. Council on Foreign Economic Policy (CFEP) was a high-level organization created by President Dwight D. Eisenhower in December 1954 to coordinate the development of the foreign economic policy of the United States.

== History ==
On July 12, 1954 the President's Advisory Committee on Government Organization chairman Nelson Rockefeller and the director of the Bureau of the Budget Rowland Hughes recommended to President Eisenhower that a detailed study be made of the adequacy of executive branch organization for the development and coordination of foreign economic policy. Eisenhower agreed that such a study was needed and ordered them to conduct the study, and to secure a top-notch individual to direct the necessary staff work. The individual selected to make the study was Joseph M. Dodge. Dodge spent the next three months contacting various government agencies and analyzing their roles in the field of foreign economic policy. In his final report to the President, dated November 22, 1954, Dodge recommended the creation of a White House staff organization devoted exclusively to the orderly development of foreign economic policy as the best method of ensuring proper coordination between the various agencies.

On December 11, 1954, the President sent a letter to Joseph Dodge which became the authority for the CFEP. Dodge was appointed a Special Assistant to the President and given the responsibility of assuring the effective coordination of foreign economics policy matters among the various executive agencies. The basic members of the CFEP were to be the Secretaries of State, Treasury, Commerce, Agriculture, and the Director of the Foreign Operations Administration. Ex officio members were to be the President’s Administrative Assistant for Economic Affairs, the President’s Special Assistant for National Security Affairs, and a member of the Council of Economic Advisers.

The first meeting of the CFEP, on December 22, 1954 was basically an organizational meeting to acquaint members with the CFEP and its responsibilities. Policy issues were not discussed in earnest until the second meeting on January 4, 1955. Thereafter the CFEP met on a weekly basis while the most pressing policy problems were debated.

Dodge resigned from the CFEP on July 10, 1956, and Clarence B. Randall succeeded Dodge as CFEP chairman. Randall was a long-time official of the Inland Steel Company of Chicago, Illinois, and in 1948 served as a steel consultant for the Economic Cooperation Administration in Paris, where he became involved in the planning of Western Europe’s steel production. In August 1953 President Eisenhower appointed Randall chairman of the President’s Commission on Foreign Economic Policy (commonly known as the Randall Commission), an ad hoc body created by Congress to study the foreign trade policy of the United States.

In addition to resolving policy disputes, the CFEP often conducted detailed studies of various aspects of foreign economic policy. Although this was sometimes done at the CFEP’s own initiative, the studies were usually made at the request of an executive agency to help the agency formulate policy. Because of its role as a coordinator, the CFEP often acted as a clearinghouse of information on foreign economic policy. One major activity of the CFEP staff was the preparation of a Handbook on Foreign Economic Policy. This was a collection of abstracts of presidential statements and government policy papers which describe the U.S. position on all aspects of foreign economic policy. The Handbook was distributed to many government agencies where it served as a useful reference work in the determination of policy matters.

During the last two months of the Eisenhower administration, the amount of work of the CFEP decreased as the government prepared for the transition to the Kennedy administration. The last CFEP meeting was held on December 20, 1960.
