= List of covers of Time magazine (1950s) =

This is a list of people and other topics appearing on the cover of Time magazine in the 1950s. Time was first published in 1923. As Time became established as one of the United States' leading news magazines, an appearance on the cover of Time became an indicator of notability, fame or notoriety. Such features were accompanied by articles.

For other decades, see Lists of covers of Time magazine.

== 1950 ==
- January 2 – Winston Churchill, Man of the Half-Century
- January 9 – Carol Channing
- January 16 – Paul Douglas
- January 23 – Mark III computer
- January 30 – Charles W. Sawyer
- February 6 – Clement Attlee
- February 13 – Glenn McCarthy
- February 20 – Kenneth Oberholtzer
- February 27 – Arthur Godfrey
- March 6 – T. S. Eliot
- March 13 – Forrest Sherman
- March 20 – Georgi Malenkov
- March 27 – Clarence Streit
- April 3 – Bhumibol Adulyadej
- April 10 – Ted Williams
- April 17 – Eddie Rickenbacker
- April 24 – Betty Hutton
- May 1 – Gian-Carlo Menotti
- May 8 – Arthur Hays Sulzberger
- May 15 – Coca-Cola
- May 22 – Harry S. Truman
- May 29 – Bảo Đại
- June 5 – Wall Street Bull
- June 12 – Darryl F. Zanuck
- June 19 – Charles F. Brannan
- June 26 – Pablo Picasso
- July 3 – William Levitt
- July 10 – Douglas MacArthur
- July 17 – Joseph Stalin
- July 24 – Omar Bradley
- July 31 – Walton Walker
- August 7 – K. C. Wu
- August 14 – Edward A. Craig
- August 21 – Yakov Malik
- August 28 – Irving Langmuir
- September 4 – Curtis LeMay
- September 11 – Arthur Radford
- September 18 – Ernst Reuter
- September 25 – Oliver P. Smith
- October 2 – Lucius D. Clay
- October 9 – Robert Frost
- October 16 – Syngman Rhee
- October 23 – Edward Almond
- October 30 – Robert A. Taft
- November 6 – Al Capp, Li'l Abner
- November 13 – George and John Hartford
- November 20 – Christopher Fry
- November 27 – Hopalong Cassidy
- December 4 – Frank Stanton
- December 11 – Mao Zedong
- December 18 – William H. Tunner
- December 25 – Fred Meyer's The Gift

== 1951 ==
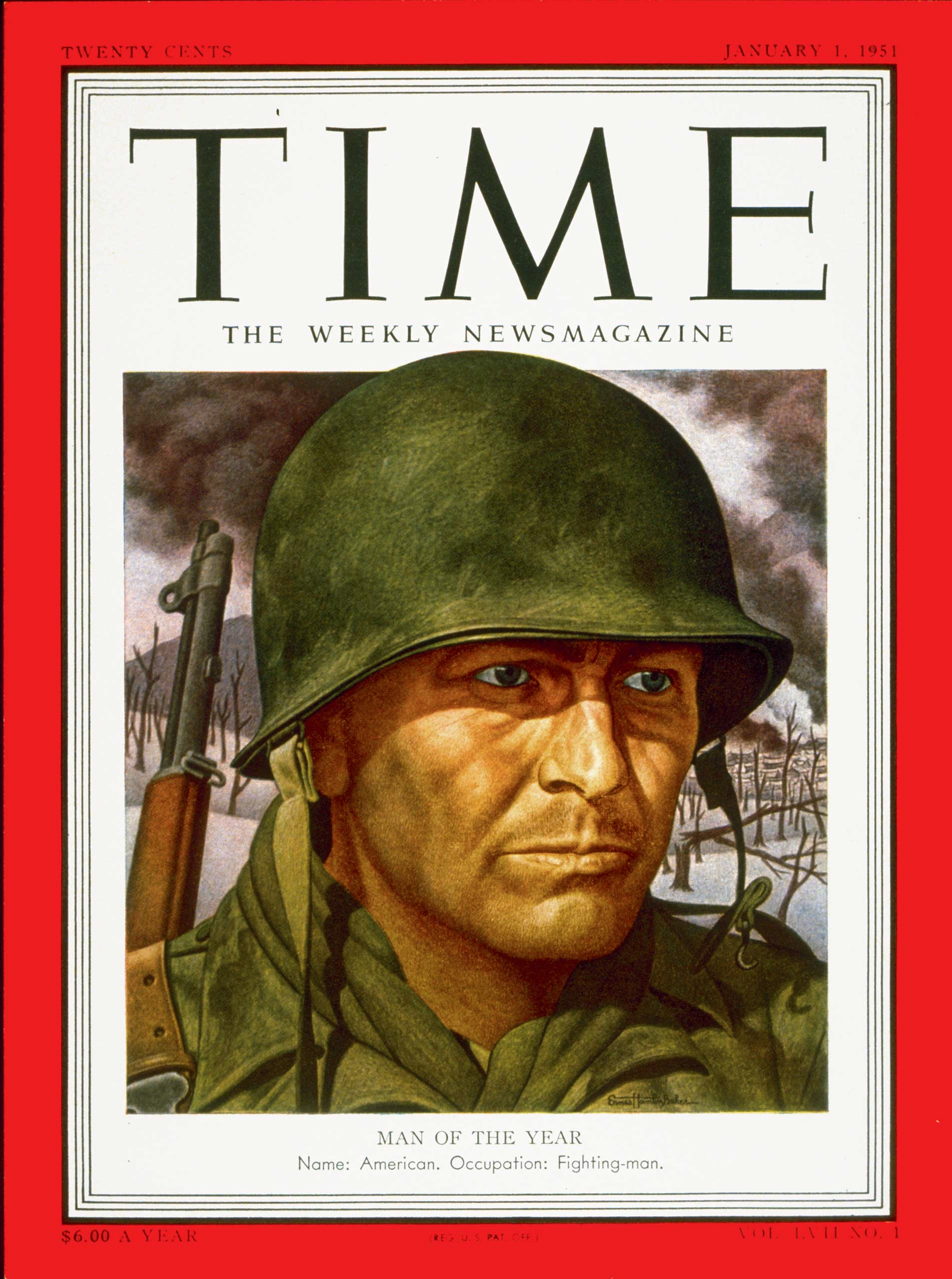
Cover for January 1, 1951, with American Fighting Man

- January 1 – American Fighting Man, Man of the Year
- January 8 – Dean Acheson
- January 15 – Rudolf Bing
- January 22 – Paul Douglas
- January 29 – Lester Lum Colbert
- February 5 – Warren Austin
- February 12 – Dwight D. Eisenhower
- February 19 – Charles E. Wilson
- February 26 – Margaret Truman
- March 5 – Matthew Ridgway
- March 12 – Estes Kefauver
- March 19 – Michael DiSalle
- March 26 – Henry Knox Sherrill
- April 2 – Vincent Auriol
- April 9 – Barbara Bel Geddes
- April 16 – Crawford Greenewalt
- April 23 – Harry S. Truman
- April 30 – Douglas MacArthur
- May 7 – Jawaharlal Nehru
- May 14 – James Van Fleet
- May 21 – Juan Perón and Eva Perón
- May 28 – Frederick Rentschler
- June 4 – Mohammad Mosaddegh
- June 11 – Alfred Whitney Griswold
- June 18 – Zhou Enlai
- June 25 – Sugar Ray Robinson
- July 2 – The Pentagon
- July 9 – James Thurber
- July 16 – Matthew Ridgway
- July 23 – David Sarnoff
- July 30 – King Baudouin I
- August 6 – Mario Lanza
- August 13 – John Foster Dulles
- August 20 – Vasily Stalin
- August 27 – Dick Savitt
- September 3 – Ava Gardner
- September 10 – King Farouk I
- September 17 – Kremlin Courier
- September 24 – Jean de Lattre de Tassigny
- October 1 – Bert Lahr
- October 8 – William M. Boyle
- October 15 – Louis Finkelstein
- October 22 – Joseph McCarthy
- October 29 – Graham Greene
- November 5 – Winston Churchill
- November 12 – Benjamin F. Fairless
- November 19 – Dick Kazmaier
- November 26 – Ramon Magsaysay
- December 3 – Patrice Munsel
- December 10 – Lila Bell Wallace and DeWitt Wallace
- December 17 – Henry Cabot Lodge Jr.
- December 24 – Madonna and Child in Chartres Cathedral
- December 31 – Groucho Marx

== 1952 ==
- January 7 – Mohammad Mosaddegh, Man of the Year
- January 14 – Gordon Dean
- January 21 – Andrea Mead Lawrence
- January 28 – Adlai Stevenson II
- February 4 – C. D. Howe
- February 11 – Anthony Eden
- February 18 – Queen Elizabeth II
- February 25 – Robert E. Wood
- March 3 – John Wayne
- March 10 – U.S. Taxpayer
- March 17 – Mortimer Adler
- March 24 – Estes Kefauver
- March 31 – Charles Laughton
- April 7 – Eleanor Roosevelt
- April 14 – Fulton J. Sheen
- April 21 – Fulgencio Batista
- April 28 – Eddie Stanky
- May 5 – D. F. Malan
- May 12 – Hoyt Vandenberg
- May 19 – Richard Russell
- May 26 – Lucille Ball
- June 2 – Robert A. Taft
- June 9 – Kurt Schumacher
- June 16 – Dwight D. Eisenhower
- June 23 – Harry Manning of SS United States
- June 30 – John S. Fine
- July 7 – Mark W. Clark
- July 14 – Media coverage of political conventions
- July 21 – Bob Mathias
- July 28 – Alben W. Barkley
- August 4 – Philip Murray
- August 11 – John Sparkman
- August 18 – George W. Merck
- August 25 – Richard Nixon
- September 1 – Katharine Hepburn
- September 8 – Muhammad Naguib
- September 15 – G. Mennen Williams
- September 22 – Wallace Harrison
- September 29 – Allan Shivers
- October 6 – Joseph Stalin and Georgy Malenkov
- October 13 – John Williams
- October 20 – Joyce Cary
- October 27 – Adlai Stevenson II
- November 3 – Dwight D. Eisenhower
- November 10 – Dwight D. Eisenhower and Richard Nixon
- November 17 – Claire Bloom
- November 24 – Lemuel Shepherd
- December 1 – Alfred Jacobsen
- December 8 – Space Pioneer
- December 15 – Gerald Templer
- December 22 – Antoine Pinay
- December 29 – Francis Henry Taylor

== 1953 ==
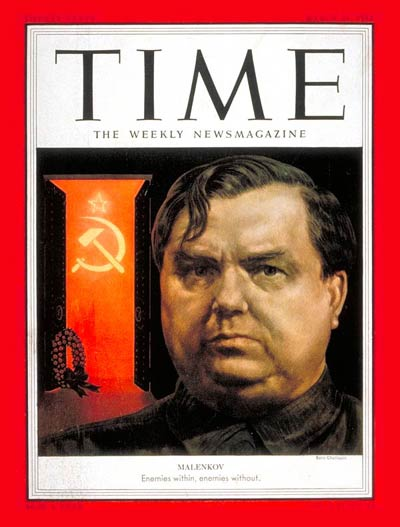
Cover for March 23, 1953, with Georgy Malenkov

- January 5 – Elizabeth II, Woman of the Year
- January 12 – Thornton Wilder
- January 19 – Mamie Eisenhower
- January 26 – George M. Humphrey
- February 2 – Harold Sines Vance
- February 9 – Kwame Nkrumah
- February 16 – Herbert Brownell
- February 23 – Rosemary Clooney
- March 2 – Gwilym A. Price
- March 9 – Syngman Rhee
- March 16 – Joseph Stalin
- March 23 – Georgy Malenkov
- March 30 – Rosalind Russell
- April 6 – F. K. Otto Dibelius
- April 13 – Ezra Taft Benson
- April 20 – Viacheslav Molotov
- April 27 – Bill Bridgeman
- May 4 – Oveta Culp Hobby
- May 11 – Vinoba Bhave
- May 18 – William, Benson and Henry Ford
- May 25 – Alcide De Gasperi
- June 1 – Charles Erwin Wilson
- June 8 – 3-D movies
- June 15 – Mickey Mantle
- June 22 – Lyndon B. Johnson
- June 29 – James H. Kindelberger
- July 6 – George Washington
- July 13 – Walter Ulbricht
- July 20 – Lavrenty Beria
- July 27 – Cornelius Shields
- August 3 – Allen Dulles
- August 10 – Shirley Booth
- August 17 – Christian Herter
- August 24 – Alfred Kinsey
- August 31 – Konrad Adenauer
- September 7 – Audrey Hepburn
- September 14 – Adolfo Ruiz Cortines
- September 21 – Lewis Strauss
- September 28 – Henri Navarre
- October 5 – Neil H. McElroy
- October 12 – John Foster Dulles
- October 19 – William Jansen
- October 26 – Frederica
- November 2 – Amateur photographer
- November 9 – Johnny Lattner
- November 16 – Igor Sikorsky
- November 23 – Harry Dexter White
- November 30 – Nikita Khrushchev
- December 7 – William F. Dean
- December 14 – Pope Pius XII
- December 21 – Earl Warren
- December 28 – Grandma Moses

== 1954 ==
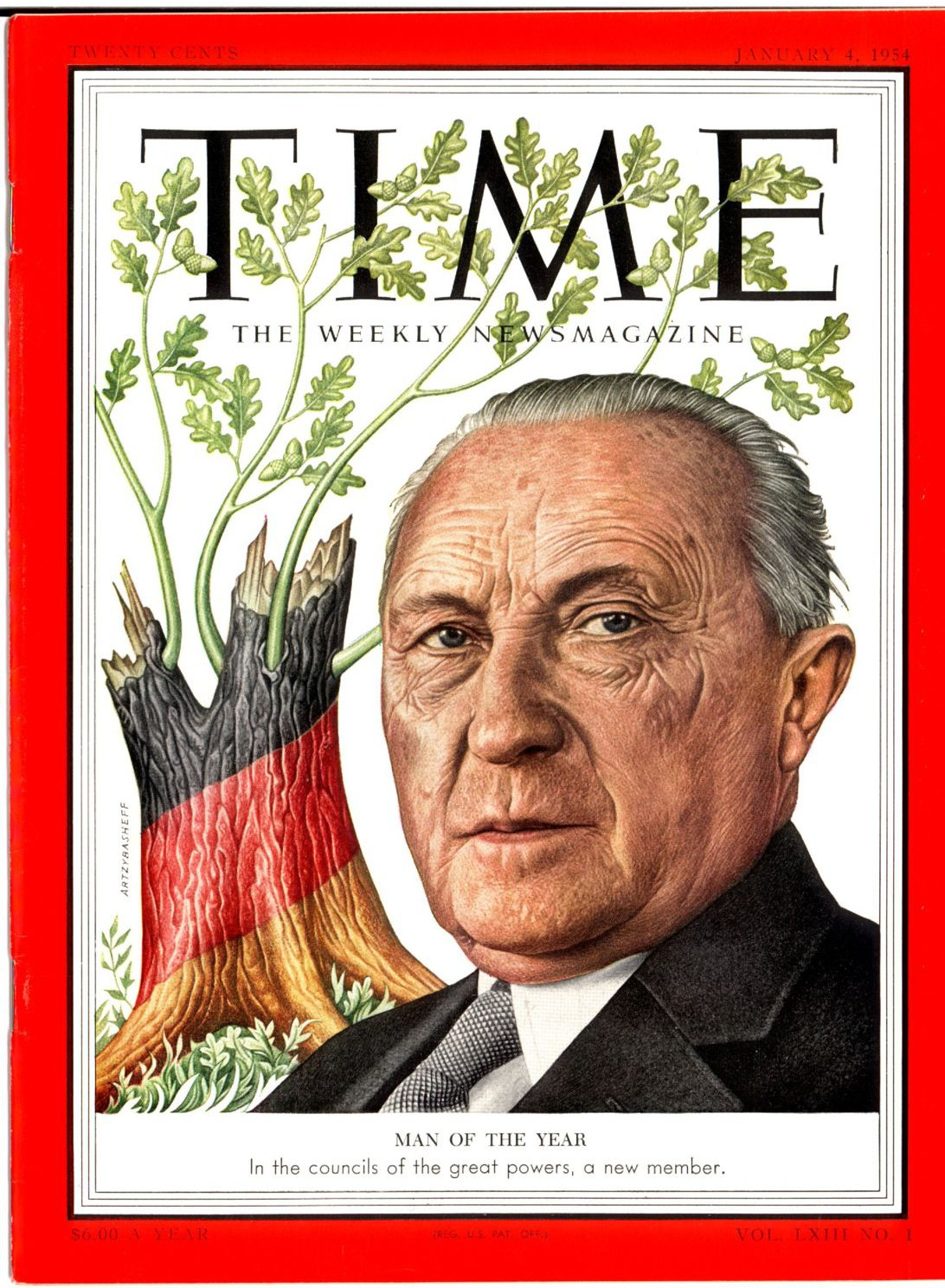
Cover for January 4, 1954, with Konrad Adenauer

- January 4 – Konrad Adenauer, Man of the Year
- January 11 – Hyman Rickover
- January 18 – Richard Nixon
- January 25 – George Balanchine
- February 1 – Harry J. Grant
- February 8 – Nathan Twining
- February 15 – Heinrich Nordhoff
- February 22 – Paul Magloire
- March 1 – Nathan M. Pusey
- March 8 – Joseph McCarthy
- March 15 – Jack Webb
- March 22 – G. David Schine and Roy Cohn
- March 29 – Jonas Salk
- April 5 – Rab Butler
- April 12 – H-bomb mushroom cloud
- April 19 – Henry P. Van Dusen
- April 26 – Briggs Cunningham
- May 3 – Harry W. Morrison
- May 10 – Zhou Enlai
- May 17 – Ray Jenkins
- May 24 – Clinton Murchison
- May 31 – Native Dancer
- June 7 – Humphrey Bogart
- June 14 – J. Robert Oppenheimer
- June 21 – Sam Snead
- June 28 – Jacobo Árbenz
- July 5 – John Sherman Cooper
- July 12 – Pierre Mendès France
- July 19 – William McPherson Allen
- July 26 – Willie Mays
- August 2 – Do-It-Yourself
- August 9 – Joseph William Martin Jr.
- August 16 – Gina Lollobrigida
- August 23 – Douglas McKay
- August 30 – U Nu
- September 6 – Geoffrey Fisher
- September 13 – Alicia Patterson
- September 20 – Clement Attlee
- September 27 – David Riesman
- October 4 – Arthur Watkins
- October 11 – Marlon Brando
- October 18 – Clifford Case
- October 25 – Billy Graham
- November 1 – Harlow Curtice
- November 8 – Dave Brubeck
- November 15 – George M. Leader
- November 22 – Ho Chi Minh
- November 29 – Bobby Layne
- December 6 – Café Filho
- December 13 – Ernest Hemingway
- December 20 – Benjamin W. Chidlaw
- December 27 – Walt Disney

== 1955 ==
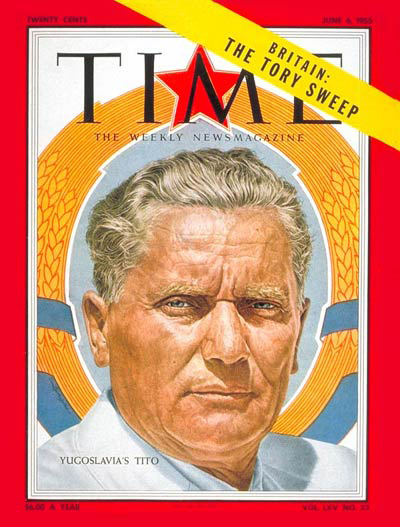
Cover for June 6, 1955, with Josip Broz Tito

- January 3 – John Foster Dulles, Man of the Year
- January 10 – Bull market
- January 17 – Wayne Morse and Richard L. Neuberger
- January 24 – Joseph Dodge
- January 31 – Grace Kelly
- February 7 – Alfred M. Pride
- February 14 – Carl Jung
- February 21 – Nikita Khrushchev
- February 28 – Marcos Pérez Jiménez
- March 7 – George N. Craig
- March 14 – Ichiro Hatoyama
- March 21 – George Meany
- March 28 – Thomas Watson Jr.
- April 4 – Ngo Dinh Diem
- April 11 – Mother Mary Columba
- April 18 – Chiang Kai-shek
- April 25 – Walter George
- May 2 – Claire McCardell
- May 9 – Georgy Zhukov
- May 16 – Lee A. Dubridge
- May 23 – Anthony Eden
- May 30 – Goodwin Knight
- June 6 – Josip Broz Tito
- June 13 – Gwen Verdon
- June 20 – Walter Reuther
- June 27 – Dag Hammarskjöld
- July 4 – Dwight D. Eisenhower
- July 11 – Gussie Busch
- July 18 – André Malraux
- July 25 – Nikolai Bulganin
- August 1 – Dwight D. Eisenhower, Anthony Eden, Nikolai Bulganin, Edgar Faure
- August 8 – Roy Campanella
- August 15 – Willard Libby
- August 22 – Carmine De Sapio
- August 29 – Frank Sinatra
- September 5 – Herman Wouk
- September 12 – John Stapp
- September 19 – Thurgood Marshall
- September 26 – Gamal Abdel Nasser
- October 3 – Casey Stengel
- October 10 – Richard Nixon
- October 17 – Ed Sullivan
- October 24 – Joe Moore
- October 31 – Irvine H. Page
- November 7 – Princess Margaret
- November 14 – W. Averell Harriman
- November 21 – Keith Funston
- November 28 – Julie Harris
- December 5 – Theodore F. Adams
- December 12 – Louis Marx
- December 19 – LeRoy Collins
- December 26 – Virgin and Child by Fra Angelico

== 1956 ==
- January 2 – Harlow Curtice, Man of the Year
- January 9 – Sherman Adams
- January 16 – David Ben-Gurion
- January 23 – Rowland Hughes
- January 30 – The Missile
- February 6 – Alfred Gruenther
- February 13 – Juscelino Kubitschek
- February 20 – Frank Lausche
- February 27 – William Holden
- March 5 – Luo Ruiqing
- March 12 – Leonard W. Hall
- March 19 – Pierre Poujade
- March 26 – James Eastland
- April 2 – Hussein bin Talal
- April 9 – Ralph Reed
- April 16 – Philip Graham
- April 23 – Sigmund Freud
- April 30 – Nikita Khrushchev
- May 7 – Ezra Taft Benson
- May 14 – Marilyn Monroe
- May 21 – Arleigh Burke
- May 28 – Robin Roberts
- June 4 – Charles Erwin Wilson
- June 11 – Jacques Barzun
- June 18 – Dwight D. Eisenhower
- June 25 – Eugene R. Black Sr.
- July 2 – Eero Saarinen
- July 9 – David J. McDonald
- July 16 – Adlai Stevenson II
- July 23 – Rex Harrison
- July 30 – Jawaharlal Nehru
- August 6 – Stavros Niarchos
- August 13 – Harry S. Truman
- August 20 – Duke Ellington
- August 27 – Gamal Nasser
- September 3 – Arthur Langlie
- September 10 – William McChesney Martin
- September 17 – Estes Kefauver
- September 24 – John D. Rockefeller Jr.
- October 1 – Robert F. Wagner Jr.
- October 8 – Duffy Daugherty
- October 15 – Herman Talmadge
- October 22 – Leo Hoegh
- October 29 – Maria Callas
- November 5 – Richard Nixon
- November 12 – Dwight D. Eisenhower and Richard Nixon
- November 19 – Anthony Eden
- November 26 – Dag Hammarskjöld
- December 3 – Parry O'Brien
- December 10 – Wladyslaw Gomulka
- December 17 – Carl-Gustaf Rossby
- December 24 – Edward Hopper
- December 31 – Paul A. Siple

== 1957 ==
- January 7 – Hungarian Patriot, Man of the Year
- January 14 – William Knowland
- January 21 – Harold Macmillan
- January 28 – Saud
- February 4 – Leonard Bernstein
- February 11 – Charles Van Doren
- February 18 – Martin Luther King
- February 25 – Arthur Radford
- March 4 – Christian Dior
- March 11 – David Ben-Gurion
- March 18 – Carrol M. Shanks
- March 25 – Charles Bailey
- April 1 – Bernard Schriever
- April 8 – Dave Beck
- April 15 – The Dead Sea Scrolls
- April 22 – Mohammed V
- April 29 – Simon Ramo and Dean Wooldridge
- May 6 – Hussein bin Talal
- May 13 – Herbert Brownell
- May 20 – Stefan Wyszynski
- May 27 – John McClellan
- June 3 – Pedro Aramburu
- June 10 – Henry Heald
- June 17 – Nuri as-Said
- June 24 – Monster Machines
- July 1 – Earl Warren
- July 8 – Birdie Tebbetts
- July 15 – Norman Chandler
- July 22 – Nikita Khrushchev
- July 29 – Kim Novak
- August 5 – John Diefenbaker
- August 12 – Richard Russell Jr.
- August 19 – Alfried Krupp
- August 26 – Althea Gibson
- September 2 – James Cozzens
- September 9 – Jimmy Hoffa
- September 16 – Anastas Mikoyan
- September 23 – Orval Faubus
- September 30 – Edward R. Murrow
- October 7 – Little Rock Integration
- October 14 – The U.S. Repairman
- October 21 – Philip
- October 28 – Ludwig Erhard
- November 4 – George W. Walker
- November 11 – Lalla Aisha
- November 18 – Edward Teller
- November 25 – Thomas D. White
- December 2 – John F. Kennedy
- December 9 – Richard Nixon
- December 16 – Lauris Norstad
- December 23 – U.S. Music Boom
- December 30 – Maria Schell

== 1958 ==
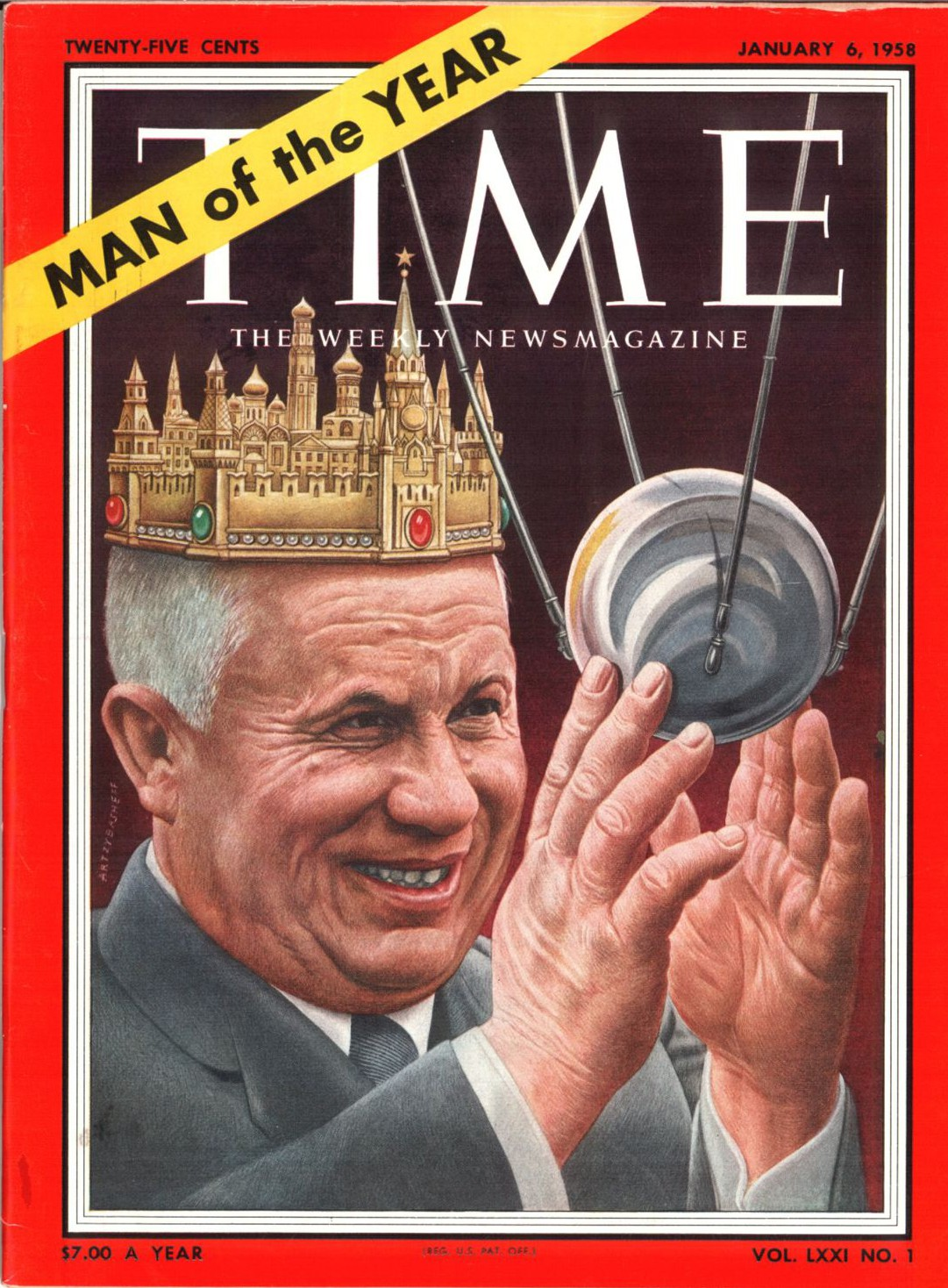
Cover for January 6, 1958, with Nikita Khrushchev

- January 6 – Nikita Khrushchev, Man of the Year
- January 13 – Neil McElroy
- January 20 – Frank Pace
- January 27 – James Hagerty
- February 3 – Adnan Menderes
- February 10 – Bill Hartack
- February 17 – Wernher von Braun
- February 24 – J. Paul Getty
- March 3 – Theodore Roosevelt
- March 10 – Sukarno
- March 17 – Lyndon B. Johnson
- March 24 – Wall Street Bull
- March 31 – Edward Durrell Stone
- April 7 – Franklin Clark Fry
- April 14 – John Gunther
- April 21 – Alec Guinness
- April 28 – Walter O'Malley
- May 5 – Charles S. Rhyne
- May 12 – Harlow Curtice, Henry Ford II and Lester Colbert
- May 19 – Van Cliburn
- May 26 – Charles de Gaulle
- June 2 – Alexander Nesmeyanov
- June 9 – Michael Stepovich
- June 16 – Jean Thom
- June 23 – Luis Muñoz Marín
- June 30 – Sherman Adams
- July 7 – Stephen Kennedy, NYC Police Commissioner
- July 14 – George Beadle
- July 21 – Robert Preston and Meredith Willson
- July 28 – Gamal Abdel Nasser
- August 4 – James L. Holloway Jr.
- August 11 – Henry Cabot Lodge Jr.
- August 18 – Jack Paar
- August 25 – Robert Daniel Murphy
- September 1 – John Thach
- September 8 – Milton Eisenhower
- September 15 – Edmund Brown Sr.
- September 22 – J. Lindsay Almond
- September 29 – Charles Goren
- October 6 – Nelson Rockefeller
- October 13 – Ferhat Abbas
- October 20 – Amos Stagg
- October 27 – Charles E. Chamberlain
- November 3 – Renata Tebaldi
- November 10 – Pope John XXIII
- November 17 – C. R. Smith
- November 24 – Democratic Hopefuls (Adlai Stevenson II, Hubert Humphrey, Stuart Symington, Lyndon B. Johnson, Robert B. Meyner, John F. Kennedy and Pat Brown)
- December 1 – Mao Tse-tung
- December 8 – Adolfo Mateos
- December 15 – Boris Pasternak
- December 22 – Miyoshi Umeki and Pat Suzuki
- December 29 – Wall Street Bull

== 1959 ==
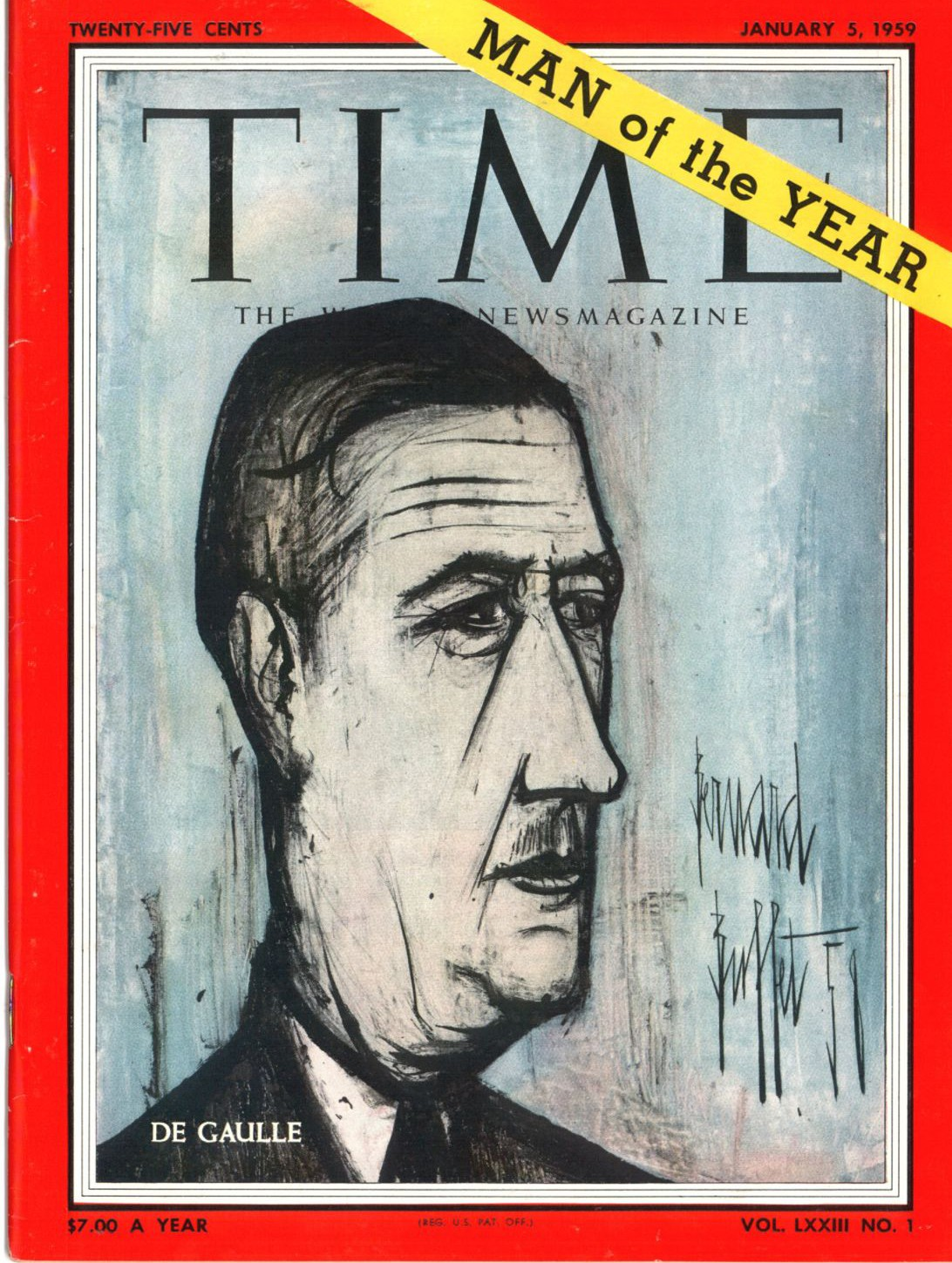
Cover for January 5, 1959, with Charles de Gaulle

- January 5 – Charles de Gaulle, Man of the Year
- January 12 – Ralph J. Cordiner
- January 19 – Space Exploration
- January 26 – Fidel Castro
- February 2 – Congressional leaders Wilbur Mills, John William McCormack, Clarence Cannon, Sam Rayburn and Howard W. Smith
- February 9 – Alec Cushing
- February 16 – Sekou Toure
- February 23 – Telephone Man
- March 2 – Harry Belafonte
- March 9 – Warren North
- March 16 – Paul Tillich
- March 23 – Michiko Shoda
- March 30 – TV's Western Heroes
- April 6 – George W. Romney
- April 13 – Abdul Karim Kassem
- April 20 – Dalai Lama
- April 26 – Christian A. Herter
- May 4 – James Van Allen
- May 11 – Lyman Lemnitzer
- May 18 – Harsen Smith
- May 25 – Willy Brandt
- June 1 – Dwight Robinson
- June 8 – Charles Halleck
- June 15 – Lewis Strauss
- June 22 – Shirley MacLaine
- June 29 – Queen Elizabeth II
- July 6 – Columbus Iselin II
- July 13 – Frol Kozlov
- July 20 – Roger Blough
- July 27 – John R. Heller Jr.
- August 3 – Richard Nixon
- August 10 – William F. Quinn
- August 17 – Jacques Soustelle
- August 24 – Rocky Colavito
- August 31 – James Hoffa
- September 7 – Dwight D. Eisenhower
- September 14 – James Bryant Conant
- September 21 – Henry Moore
- September 28 – Nikita Khrushchev
- October 5 – Edward N. Cole
- October 12 – Liu Shaoqi
- October 19 – Harold Macmillan
- October 26 – TV's Private Eyes
- November 2 – Henry Clay Alexander
- November 9 – Stuart Symington
- November 16 – Robert Kintner
- November 23 – Robert Bernard Anderson
- November 30 – Sam Huff
- December 7 – Charles Mortimer
- December 14 – Jawaharlal Nehru
- December 21 – Anne Bancroft
- December 28 – 18th-century crèche

Previous	Lists of covers of Time magazine	Next
1940s	1950s	1960s
