= Michelle Davidson =

Michelle Davidson may refer to:

- Michelle Davidson (swimmer)
- Michelle Davidson (actress)

== See also ==
- Michelle Davison, American diver
