= Eastgulf, West Virginia =

Unincorporated community in West Virginia, United States

- Unincorporated community
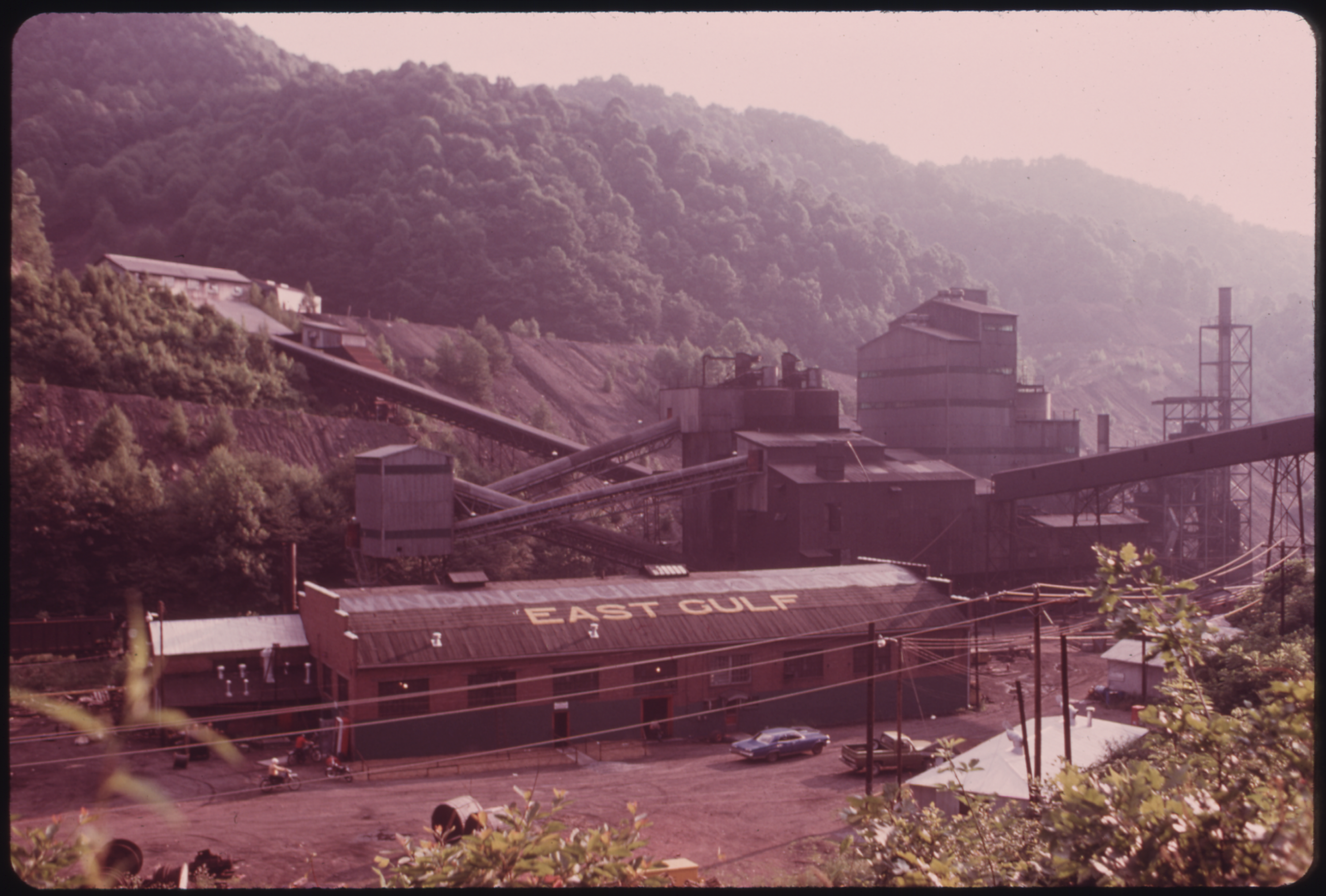
- East Gulf, West Virginia coal processing plant

- Location within West Virginia Location within the United States
- Coordinates: 37°37′46″N 81°17′41″W
- Country: United States
- State: West Virginia
- County: Raleigh
- Elevation: 1,680 ft (510 m)
- Time zone: UTC-5 (Eastern (EST))
  - Summer (DST): UTC-4 (EDT)
- Area codes: 304 & 681
- GNIS feature ID: 1554360

Eastgulf is an unincorporated community in Raleigh County, West Virginia, United States. Eastgulf is 6 miles (9.7 km) south-southwest of Sophia.

Cornelius H. Charlton (1929-1951), United States Army soldier and recipient of the Congressional Medal of Honor, was born in Eastgulf.
