= Gwilym A. Price =

American politician

Gwilym Alexander Price (June 20, 1895, Canonsburg, Pennsylvania – June 1, 1985, Kennedy Township, Allegheny County, Pennsylvania) was a lawyer, Pennsylvania state legislator, banker, and industrialist.

== Biography ==
Because of the death of his father, who was a tin mill worker, Gwylim A. Price dropped out of high school to support his widowed mother. He took a secretarial course and worked full-time for a mortgage company. After studying nights and weekends, he entered the University of Pittsburgh Law School. After graduating in 1917 (as the youngest member of the class), he became a first lieutenant in the U.S. Army and during WW I served in France, where he was promoted to captain.

He served a two-year term (1923–1924) as a state representative in the Pennsylvania House of Representatives and remained active for many years in Republican politics. Price became in 1920 an assistant trust officer at People's First National Bank and Trust Company in Pittsburgh and became in 1940 its president. He resigned in 1943 to become a vice president at Westinghouse Service Corporation, which in 1945 was renamed Westinghouse Electric Corporation. Price was promoted to executive vice president in 1945, chief-executive-officer (CEO) and president in 1946, and board chair in 1955. Under his leadership, the corporation became a pioneer in nuclear energy and increased its presence in military and appliance engineering. He retired in 1959 as CEO and president but continued to serve on the corporate board until 1967.

As a Westinghouse executive, his projects included pioneer work in atomic energy, establishing an atomic power division in 1948 and working on a prototype propulsion reactor for the Atomic Energy Commission.

Price was from 1957 to 1959 the national chair of the Crusade for Freedom. He was from 1959 to 1970 the chair of the University of Pittsburgh's board of trustees.

Price was featured on the cover of Time magazine in the March 2, 1953, issue. He won in 1957 the Horatio Alger Award and in 1960 the John Fritz Medal. In the early 1970s the University of Pittsburgh held Gwilym Price Engineering Lectures. He was given honorary degrees from several institution, including the Carnegie Institute of Technology and Allegheny College.

About 1921 Price married Marion Roberts, who was a high school teacher in Pittsburgh. The couple had three sons.

== Death ==
Upon Price's death he was survived by two sons, eight grandchildren, and three great-grandchildren. The eldest son, Judge Gwilym A. Price Jr. of Pennsylvania Superior Court, died in 1983 at age 60.
