= Cornelius H. Charlton =

United States Army Medal of Honor recipient

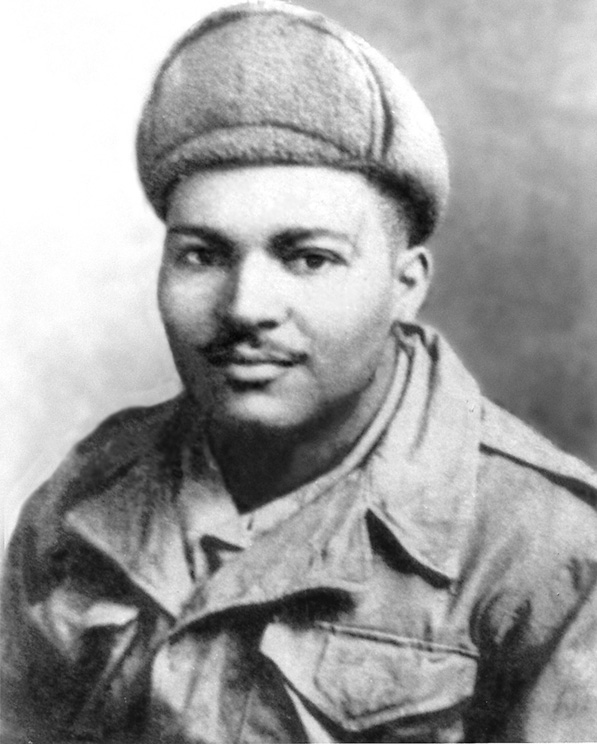
- Born: July 24, 1929; Eastgulf, West Virginia, U.S.
- Died: June 2, 1951 (aged 21) near Chipo-ri, Korea
- Burial place: Arlington National Cemetery
- Military career
- Allegiance: United States
- Branch: United States Army
- Service years: 1946–1951
- Rank: Sergeant
- Nickname: "Connie"
- Service number: 12265495
- Units: 24th Infantry Regiment, 25th Infantry Division
- Conflicts: Korean War: UN May-June 1951 counteroffensive; Operation Piledriver (DOW)
- Awards: Medal of Honor; Purple Heart

Cornelius H. Charlton (July 24, 1929 – June 2, 1951) was a soldier in the United States Army during the Korean War, who was posthumously awarded the Medal of Honor for his actions near Chipo-ri, South Korea on June 2, 1951.

Born to a coal mining family in West Virginia, Charlton enlisted in the army out of high school in 1946. He was transferred in 1951 to the segregated 24th Infantry Regiment, 25th Infantry Division, fighting in the Korean War. During a battle for Hill 543 near the village of Chipo-ri, Charlton took command of his platoon after its commanding officer was injured, leading it on three successive assaults of the hill. Charlton continued to lead the attack until the Chinese position was destroyed, at the cost of his life. For these actions, Charlton was awarded the Medal of Honor.

In the following years, Charlton was honored numerous times, but was controversially not given a spot in Arlington National Cemetery, which his family claimed was due to racial discrimination. The controversy attracted national attention before Charlton was finally reburied in Arlington in 2008.

== Early life ==
Cornelius H. Charlton was born in Eastgulf, West Virginia on July 24, 1929. He was the eighth of 17 children born to Van Charlton, a coal miner, and Clara (née Thompson) Charlton, a housewife. Cornelius briefly moved to Coalwood, West Virginia in 1940 to live with his brother, Arthur. In 1944, the family moved to The Bronx in New York City, New York as Van Charlton became the superintendent of an apartment building. Cornelius Charlton enrolled in James Monroe High School. Friends and family knew Charlton as "Connie."

Charlton indicated a desire to join the United States Army from a young age; in high school he begged his parents to allow him to drop out and enlist, wanting to fight in World War II, but his parents refused. (Note: The American Battle Monuments Commission states incorrectly that Charlton was a veteran of World War II.) When Charlton graduated from high school in 1946, he remained committed to joining the Army, so his parents signed the papers allowing 17-year-old Charlton to enlist.

== Military career ==
Charlton left for Basic Combat Training in November 1946. As an African American, he entered the Army at a time when it was still segregated. In 1948, U.S. president Harry S. Truman ordered the desegregation of the U.S. military with Executive Order 9981. However, many units remained de facto segregated, with African Americans mostly being pooled into service units and non-combat duties. It would be several years before troops were fully integrated.

Upon graduating from basic training, Charlton was assigned to Allied-occupied Germany, where he served out his whole enlistment. Charlton opted to re-enlist, and his next assignment was with a military engineering battalion at Aberdeen Proving Ground in Aberdeen, Maryland.

In 1950, Charlton was assigned to the Occupation of Japan, and was given an administrative job on Okinawa with an engineering group of the Eighth United States Army. However, Charlton indicated a desire to fight in the Korean War, and so he requested transfer to a front line unit in South Korea. He was subsequently assigned to C Company, 1st Battalion, 24th Infantry Regiment, part of the 25th Infantry Division. The regiment was one of the de facto segregated units, made up almost entirely of African American men led by white officers. From its arrival in September 1950, the regiment had been plagued by poor performance and accusations of cowardice. Division commander Major General William B. Kean had requested the unit be disbanded, finding the regiment "untrustworthy."

Charlton arrived at C Company of the regiment's 1st Battalion in early 1951, and at first was regarded with suspicion by officers and leaders in his unit. A sergeant, he was made a squad leader in the 3rd Platoon, and quickly impressed his unit's company commander with his natural leadership ability, and soon his squad was considered a model unit. In May 1951, Charlton was made the platoon sergeant and his commander recommended him for a battlefield commission.

=== Medal of Honor action ===
"He got the rest of the men together, and we started for the top. The enemy had some good emplacements ... we couldn't get to him. Grenades kept coming at us and we were chased back down. Again we tried, but no luck. Sgt. Charlton said he was going to make it this time, and he yelled 'Let's go,' and we started up again. We reached the top this time. I saw the sergeant go over the top and charge a bunker on the other side. He got the gun but was killed by a grenade."

— PFC Ronald Holmes, one of Charlton's subordinates, recounting his Medal of Honor action.

In late May and early June 1951, the Eighth Army launched Operation Piledriver, a concentrated effort to push Chinese and North Korean troops further north and out of South Korea. The 25th Infantry Division advanced as part of this operation. The 24th Infantry saw a slow advance during this operation, attempting to advance on Kumwha but encountering strong resistance. On July 1, the 2nd Battalion, 24th Infantry took heavy casualties and was forced to withdraw to reserve positions, and the 1st and 3rd Battalions moved up to continue the advance.

On June 2, C Company moved to capture Hill 543 near the village of Chipo-ri. (Note: Reef 2010, p. 70 states this was Hill 1147, but other sources do not collaborate this claim.) The hill was protected by heavily entrenched Chinese infantry as well as mortars at the top of the hill. During their first attempt to advance up the hill, the company took heavy casualties, and the 3rd Platoon leader was mortally wounded. Charlton took command of the platoon and reorganized it for another attack. Heavy fire eventually forced the company back down the hill.

Three times, Charlton led the platoon up the hill in the face of intense Chinese mortar and infantry fire. In spite of mounting casualties, the platoon made slow progress. Charlton single-handedly destroyed two Chinese positions and killed six Chinese soldiers with rifle fire and grenades. During one advance, Charlton was wounded in the chest, but he refused medical treatment and pushed the company forward. Charlton continued to lead the attack from the front of the platoon, and several times was separated from the unit. Subsequent accounts noted Charlton continued the advance "holding his chest wound with one hand and an M1 carbine with the other."

Under Charlton's leadership, the platoon managed to overcome the Chinese infantry positions, but it spotted a Chinese bunker on the far side of the top of the hill, from which the mortars were firing on them. As recounted by Private First Class Ronald Holmes, one of the men in the platoon, Charlton decided to destroy the bunker, and with his last known words, "Let's go," he urged the platoon forward, charging at the front of the formation ahead of the rest of his men. In one final action, Charlton advanced alone to the top of the hill and the location of the Chinese mortars, firing repeatedly on the emplacement there. The Chinese troops wounded Charlton one final time with a grenade, but he continued firing until the position was destroyed. Charlton subsequently died from the wounds inflicted by the grenade. However, he is credited with saving much of his platoon, which had been under heavy mortar fire.

== Burial ==
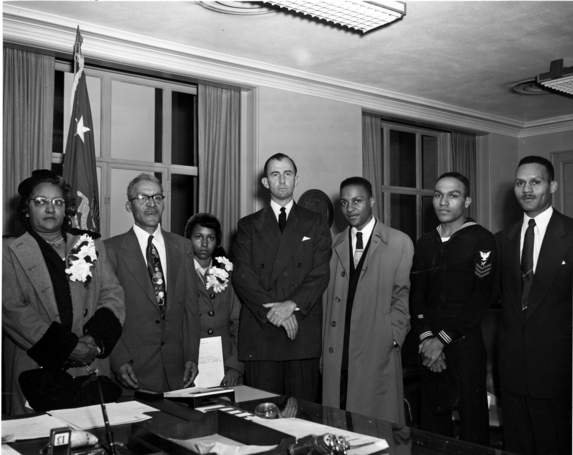
Charlton's family meets with Secretary of the Army Frank Pace in 1952, as Charlton is recognized with the Medal of Honor

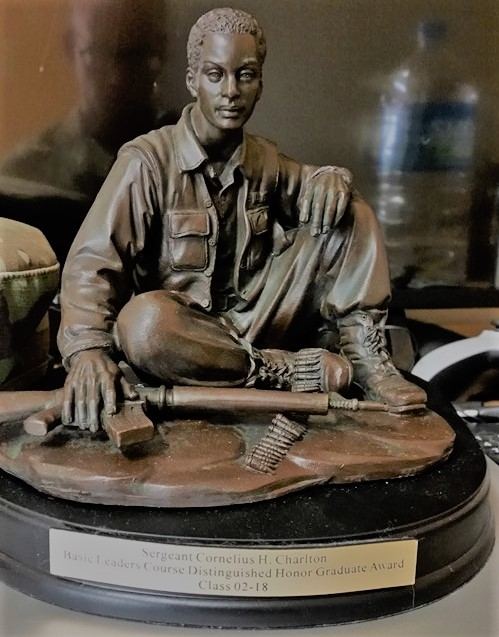
Award for Distinguished Honor Grad at Wightman NCOA

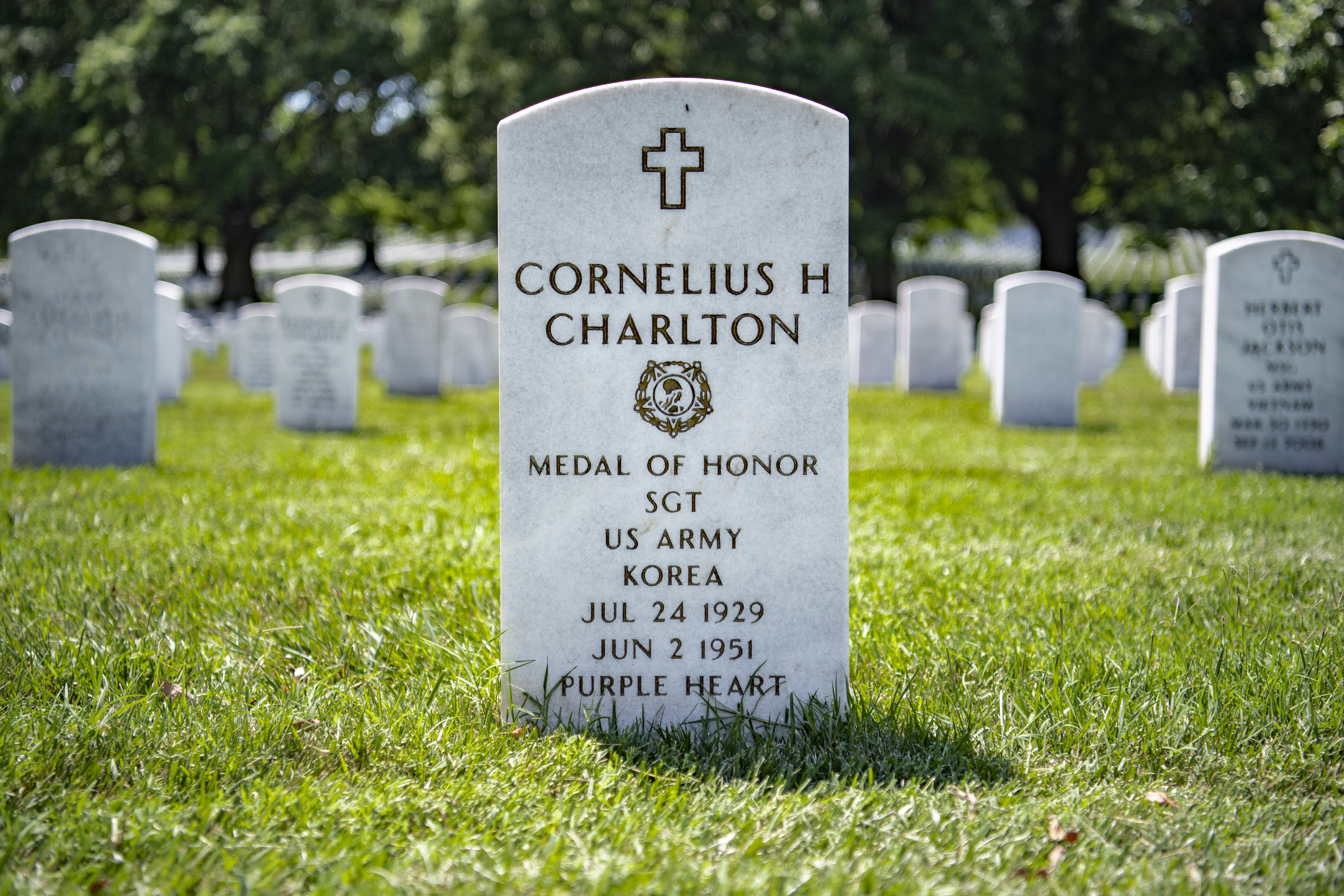
Grave at Arlington National Cemetery

Charlton's parents were presented with his Medal of Honor on March 12, 1952, by Secretary of the Army Frank Pace. In 1952, the US Army renamed its New York-based Ferryboat 84, a ferry boat that traveled to Governors Island in the Upper New York Bay, for Charlton. In September 1954, West Virginia renamed a bridge on the West Virginia Turnpike in honor of Charlton, the Charlton Memorial Bridge on Interstate 77. Charlton was also memorialized in the Bronx, with a park in the Morrisania area being named for Charlton in 1952, and in 1958 several gardens in Van Cortlandt Park in South Bronx were planted in his honor. These gardens are the site of annual Memorial Day gatherings of the local neighborhood where Charlton and other Bronx residents killed in the Korean War are honored. In 1993, a new barracks complex for US Forces Korea in South Korea was also named in Charlton's honor. In 2000, the United States Navy commissioned the USNS Charlton, a Watson-class vehicle cargo ship. Charlton's sister, Fairy M. Papadopoulos, served as the ship's co-sponsor. The Distinguished Honor Grad for the Basic Leaders Course at the Wightman NCO Academy in Korea receives a statue in his honor.

There was some controversy over Charlton's burial after his death. In 1951, Charlton was not offered a burial plot in Arlington National Cemetery in Arlington, Virginia, a custom which is routinely afforded to all Medal of Honor recipients. The US Army later claimed that this was due to an "administrative error," but Charlton's family believed the omission was due to racial discrimination. Instead, Charlton was buried in Bryant Cemetery, a segregated cemetery in Bramwell, West Virginia, in 1951. The military did not offer to rebury Charlton at Arlington until 1989, and the family refused on the grounds that the oversight had been discrimination. Instead, American Legion Post 32 in Beckley offered to bury Charlton in their own cemetery. On March 10, 1989, Charlton was reburied there with full military honors at a ceremony attended by congressmen, several US Army generals, and an honor guard. Of the 252 buried there, Charlton was the only African American. The controversy received national coverage when it was written about in the Los Angeles Times. On November 12, 2008, following efforts of other Medal of Honor recipients, Charlton was finally reburied at Arlington National Cemetery, where his remains currently reside.

== Medal of Honor citation ==
Charlton was the second of two African Americans to be awarded the Medal of Honor for the Korean War, the other being William Thompson who had been posthumously honored for his actions with the 24th Infantry Regiment during the Battle of Pusan Perimeter. They were the first two African Americans to be nominated for the Medal of Honor since the Spanish–American War, though several World War II veterans were later nominated. The two nominations had seen delays because unit commanders refused to submit their nominations.

Sgt. Charlton, a member of Company C, distinguished himself by conspicuous gallantry and intrepidity above and beyond the call of duty in action against the enemy. His platoon was attacking heavily defended hostile positions on commanding ground when the leader was wounded and evacuated. Sgt. Charlton assumed command, rallied the men, and spearheaded the assault against the hill. Personally eliminating 2 hostile positions and killing 6 of the enemy with his rifle fire and grenades, he continued up the slope until the unit suffered heavy casualties and became pinned down. Regrouping the men he led them forward only to be again hurled back by a shower of grenades. Despite a severe chest wound, Sgt. Charlton refused medical attention and led a third daring charge which carried to the crest of the ridge. Observing that the remaining emplacement which had retarded the advance was situated on the reverse slope, he charged it alone, was again hit by a grenade but raked the position with a devastating fire which eliminated it and routed the defenders. The wounds received during his daring exploits resulted in his death but his indomitable courage, superb leadership, and gallant self-sacrifice reflect the highest credit upon himself the infantry, and the military service.

== Awards and decorations ==
Charlton's awards and decorations include:

Badge	Combat Infantryman Badge		
1st row	Medal of Honor	Purple Heart	Army Good Conduct Medal
2nd row	World War II Victory Medal	Army of Occupation Medal with 'Germany' clasp	National Defense Service Medal
3rd row	Korean Service Medal with 1 Campaign star	United Nations Service Medal Korea	Korean War Service Medal
Unit awards	Korean Presidential Unit Citation		

== See also ==
- List of Korean War Medal of Honor recipients
- List of African American Medal of Honor recipients
