= Frederick Lawton =

American lawyer

Fred Lawton
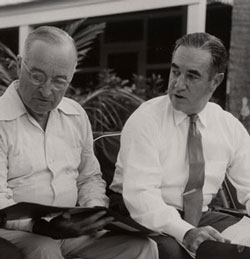
- Lawton (right) with Harry S. Truman

Member of the United States Civil Service Commission
- In office 1953–1963
- President: Dwight D. Eisenhower; John F. Kennedy
- Preceded by: Frances Perkins
- Succeeded by: L. J. Andolesk

9th Director of the Bureau of the Budget
- In office April 13, 1950 – January 21, 1953
- President: Harry S. Truman
- Preceded by: Frank Pace
- Succeeded by: Joseph Dodge

Personal details
- Born: Frederick Joseph Lawton; November 11, 1900 Washington, District of Columbia, U.S.
- Died: November 16, 1975 (aged 75) Washington, District of Columbia, U.S.
- Party: Democratic
- Education: Georgetown University (BA, LLB)
- Awards: President's Award for Distinguished Federal Civilian Service (1961)

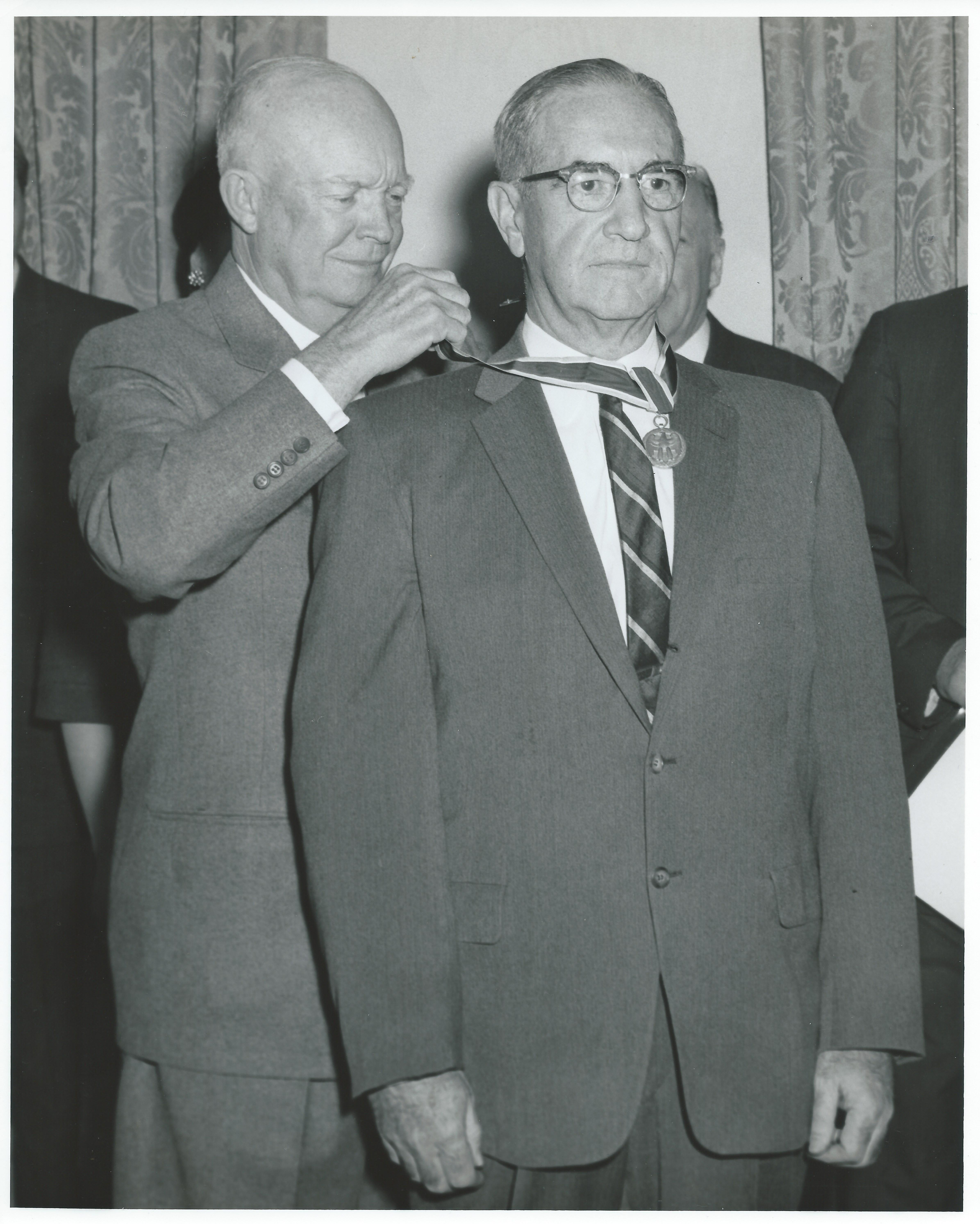
President Dwight D. Eisenhower awards Fredrick J. Lawton the President's Award for Distinguished Federal Civilian Service in 1961

Frederick Joseph Lawton (November 11, 1900 – November 16, 1975) was an American bureaucrat who served as the ninth Director of the Bureau of the Budget. Lawton was born in Washington, D.C., and became a lawyer and an accountant. He spent most of his professional career working with the government bureaucracy. He helped President Franklin D. Roosevelt wager with members of Congress to support the Fair Labor Standards Act. He first joined the Office of Management and Budget as an executive assistant in 1935. He also served as an adviser to Congress. In 1947, he became an administrative assistant to President Harry S. Truman. He was appointed to the post of Director of the Bureau of the Budget in 1950, and held the position until 1953. President Dwight D. Eisenhower appointed Lawton to a term on the United States Civil Service Commission after he left the Bureau; he served from 1953 to 1963.

His economic policy consisted of making budget cuts among various departments of the federal government. One of his primary contributions was in helping to re-design the Bureau of Internal Revenue, action which led to the creation of the Internal Revenue Service. Lawton advocated a civil service, rather than a patronage system for tax agents. He opposed a number of plans in Congress, including a fair trade bill and attempts to decentralize the federal offices in Washington, D.C., to other areas of the country.

== Life ==
Lawton was born in Washington, D.C., on November 11, 1900, and lived there throughout his life. He graduated from Georgetown University in 1920. Professionally, Lawton was a lawyer and an accountant. He was a registered Democrat for much of his life. He was married to the former Cecilia Walsh of Sussex County, New Jersey and had three children; Richard Lawton, an ARAMCO oil executive, Mary C. Lawton, Deputy Assistant Attorney General of the US and Kathleen Lawton Kenna, a Department of the Army senior executive Civilian Personnel Officer.

== Bureaucratic career ==
President Franklin D. Roosevelt used Lawton to build support Fair Labor Standards Act in the United States Congress. Roosevelt instructed him to go to a hotel room, where Roosevelt would send various members of Congress to visit. Once there, Lawton was to put into the budget whatever pork barrel projects the Congressmen required in order to buy a supporting vote for the bill.

Lawton first meet President Harry S. Truman in 1938, during the consideration of the Roosevelt Reorganization Act in the United States Senate, in the cloakroom of the United States Capitol. He only had one professional interaction with Truman before his Presidency, over the Canol Road project.

== Office of Management and Budget ==
=== Jobs held ===
Lawton first joined the Office of Management and Budget as an executive assistant in 1935. During this time, he also appeared as a consultant and adviser to the Senate's Select Committee on Government Organization. Lawton landed the job of adviser to the Senate Select Committee when the Senate asked for a liaison and expert from the Budget Bureau; Lawton himself speculated that he received the job because his post did not have specific estimates assigned to it, leaving him free for new duties. At the time of the assignment, he had been heading the Budget Bureau's Financial Records Division. However, after the federal budget was submitted to Congress every year, Lawton's job mainly consisted of various "spot jobs" and loans to other organizations.

He served as an executive assistant until 1947, when he became an administrative assistant to President Harry S. Truman. In 1949, after one year as an administrative assistant, he became the assistant director of the Bureau of the Budget, taking the position vacated by Frank Pace when he became the Director of the Bureau. He served as the Director of the Bureau from 1950 to 1953. He received the job again upon vacation of Frank Pace, who was appointed the United States Secretary of the Army. Eisenhower awarded him the President's Award for Distinguished Federal Civilian Service in 1961 for his years of service in the federal government.

=== Actions and economic policy ===
As Director, Lawton worked to cut departmental expenses in the federal budget. However, as assistant director, he argued strongly against calls from Congress for large-scale budget cuts, claiming that such a thing would not be possible because of "fixed" expenses like paying down the public debt and giving promised veteran's benefits. In the end, Lawton, under order of Congress, cut more than $500 million in operating costs within the government.

Lawton called for reform within the Bureau of Internal Revenue, claiming that its "magnitude and complexity" required an overhaul. His advocacy led the Bureau to be renamed the Internal Revenue Service, and a reorganization of the Bureau which established agents as career civil servants, rather than using the patronage system.

Lawton most often backed the policies of Truman. He joined with Truman in fighting a fair trade bill in Congress. Lawton supported a requested merger of Pan American World Airways and American Overseas Airlines, a plan that Truman initially opposed, but then passed over the recommendation of the Civil Aeronautics Board. Lawton vocally opposed plans to decentralize the federal offices in Washington, D.C., spreading them throughout the country so that an enemy attack would not cripple the entire national government. Lawton argued that there was a shortage of office space around the country that made the plans impossible to implement. Lawton often removed himself from debates, treating his job as a technical and administrative one. While he advocated fiscal restraint, he mostly found ways of carrying out Truman's policies, rather than arguing for them. He sought less publicity than his predecessors.

When President Dwight D. Eisenhower took office, Lawton remained skeptical that the Republican President could cut much money from the budget without completely overhauling then-current government programs. Despite this, Lawton played an active role in preparing his successor Joseph Dodge for his assignment.

== Civil Service Commission ==
After leaving the Bureau of Budget, Lawton became a member of the United States Civil Service Commission. Eisenhower nominated Lawton for the position, to fill the Democrat commission position vacated by Frances Perkins. He was appointed to a six-year term, but ultimately served from 1953 to 1963. L. J. Andolesk succeeded him in 1963. Lawton died in 1975.

== Bibliography ==
- Lawton, Frederick (Summer 1953). "Legislative-Executive Relationships in Budgeting as Viewed by the Executive". Public Administration Review. 13 (3): 169–176. doi:10.2307/972739. JSTOR 972739.
- Lawton, Frederick (Spring 1954). "The Role of the Administrator in the Federal Government". Public Administration Review. 14 (2): 112–118. doi:10.2307/972636. JSTOR 972636.
- Lawton, Frederick (Spring 1956). "Review: Improving the Budgetary Process". Public Administration Review. 16 (2): 117–121. doi:10.2307/974165. JSTOR 974165.

Political offices
Preceded by Frank Pace	Director of the Bureau of the Budget; 1950–1953	Succeeded by Joseph Dodge
