= Percival Brundage =

American accountant (1892–1979)

12th Director of the Bureau of the Budget
- In office April 2, 1956 – March 17, 1958
- President: Dwight D. Eisenhower
- Preceded by: Rowland Hughes
- Succeeded by: Maurice Stans

Personal details
- Born: Percival Flack Brundage; April 2, 1892 Amsterdam, New York, U.S.
- Died: July 16, 1979 (aged 87) Ridgewood, New Jersey, U.S.
- Party: Republican
- Education: Harvard University (BA)

Percival Flack Brundage (April 2, 1892 – July 16, 1979) was an American accountant who served as the director of the United States Office of Management and Budget from April 2, 1956, until March 17, 1958.

== Early years ==
Brundage was born on 2 April 1892 in Amsterdam, New York, the son of Unitarian minister the Rev. William Milton Brundage.

== Career ==
Before entering government service, Brundage was an accountant since 1914, and a senior partner at Price Waterhouse & Co. Brundage was appointed as deputy director when Rowland Hughes was appointed director in May 1954. President Eisenhower appointed Brundage as director from 2 April 1956 (his 64th birthday), following Hughes' resignation. He resigned from the post on 13 March 1956. In 1955, Brundage was elected to the Accounting Hall of Fame.

== Boards and charity work ==
Brundage was president of the National Bureau of Economic Research and president of the American Institute of Accountants. He was also Treasurer for the People to People Health Foundation, as well as director of the American Unitarian Association.

== Personal life ==
In 1918, Brundage married Amittai Ostrander and had a son (Robert Percival) and a daughter (Lois Ammittai), and 4 grandchildren. Brundage was an amateur artist who exhibited paintings at the Century Club in New York.

Political offices
Preceded by Maurice Stans	Director of the Bureau of the Budget; 1961–1962	Succeeded by Kermit Gordon
