= Maurice Stans =

American accountant (1908–1998)

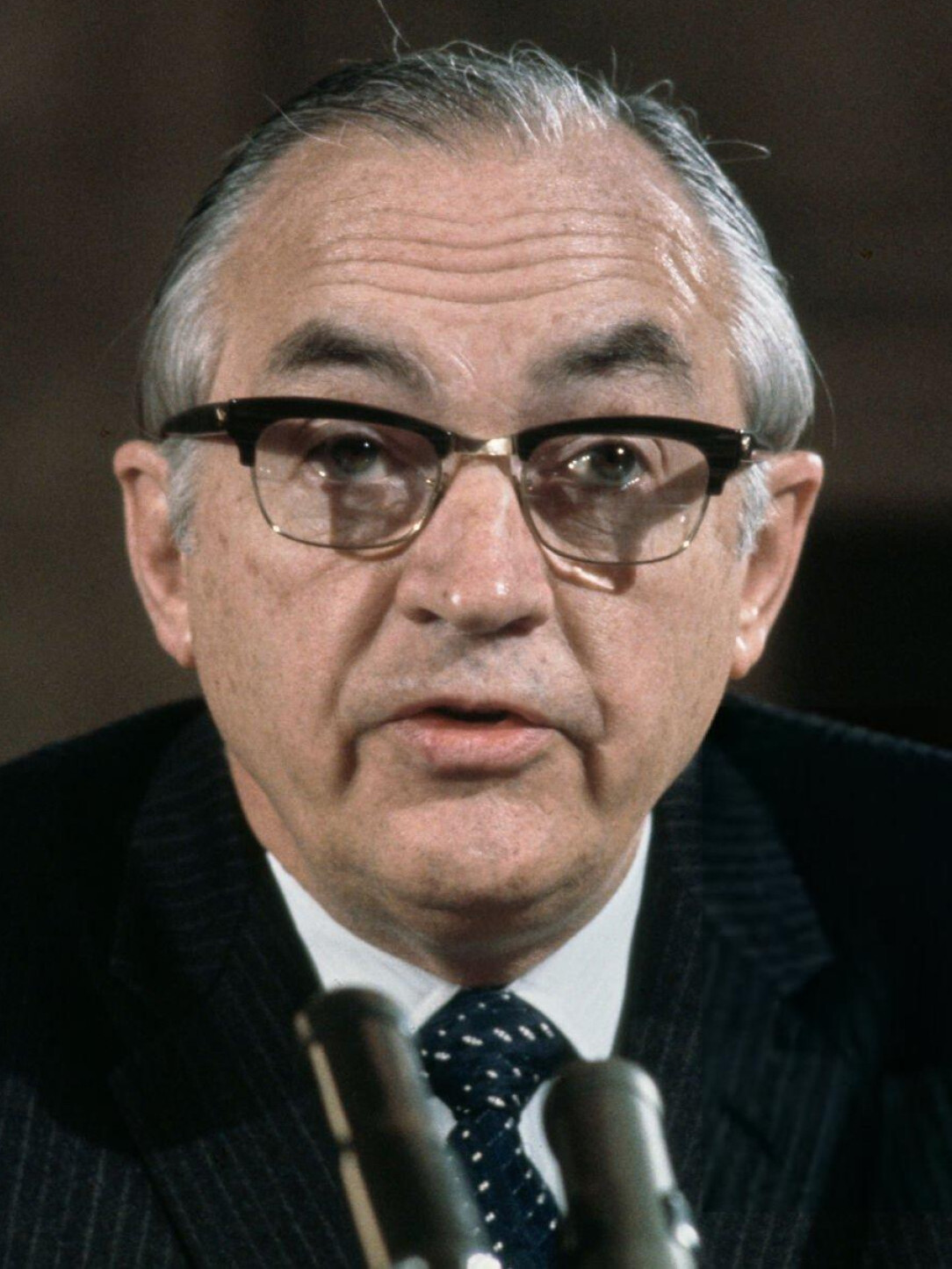

19th United States Secretary of Commerce
- In office January 21, 1969 – February 15, 1972
- President: Richard Nixon
- Preceded by: C. R. Smith
- Succeeded by: Peter G. Peterson

13th Director of the Bureau of the Budget
- In office March 18, 1958 – January 21, 1961
- President: Dwight D. Eisenhower
- Preceded by: Percival Brundage
- Succeeded by: David E. Bell

Personal details
- Born: Maurice Hubert Stans; March 22, 1908 Shakopee, Minnesota, U.S.
- Died: April 14, 1998 (aged 90) Pasadena, California, U.S.
- Party: Republican
- Spouse: Kathleen Stans
- Children: 4
- Education: Northwestern University (attended); Columbia University (attended)

Maurice Hubert Stans (March 22, 1908 – April 14, 1998) was an American accountant, civil servant, and political organizer who served as the 19th United States Secretary of Commerce from 1969 to 1972. He served as the finance chairman for the Committee for the Re-Election of the President, working for the re-election of Richard Nixon. He pleaded guilty to five counts for violations of the Federal Election Campaign Act during the Watergate scandal.

== Early life and education ==
Stans was born on March 22, 1908, in Shakopee, Minnesota, the son of James Hubert Stans and Mathilda Stans (nee Nyssen). His father was the only child of Jan Hendrik Stans and Maria Catharina Crijns, a Belgian couple who immigrated to the United States in 1880. Stans graduated from Shakopee High School in 1925. He worked at a local foundry before traveling to Chicago to find work with friend, Otto F. Schultz. The same year, he began work as a stenographer and bookkeeper for a Chicago importer, while attending evening classes at Northwestern University. In 1928 he joined the Chicago-based firm of Alexander Grant and Company, certified public accountants, and continued his part-time studies at Columbia University while working at the firm's New York City office. He attended Columbia from 1928 to 1930.

== Career ==
Stans was an executive partner with the Alexander Grant & Co. accounting firm in Chicago from 1940 until 1955. He was a Certified Public Accountant, licensed in New York, Ohio and Virginia. He was President of the American Institute of Accountants from 1954 to 1955 and won the Gold Medal for Distinguished Service to the Profession in 1954. He was inducted into the Accounting Hall of Fame in 1960.

=== Public servant under Eisenhower and Nixon ===
External videos
- 1973 Watergate Hearings; 1973-06-13; Part 1 of 3, 1:36:09, Library of Congress, American Archive of Public Broadcasting (WGBH and the Library of Congress), Boston, MA and Washington, DC

He later served as U.S. deputy postmaster general from 1955 to 1957, in the Dwight Eisenhower administration. He served as deputy director of the Bureau of the Budget from 1957 to 1958, and director of the Bureau of the Budget from 1958 to 1961, still under Eisenhower. He joined the Nixon administration as secretary of commerce from 1969 to 1972. In 1961, Stans was one of the founders of the African Wildlife Foundation.

=== Watergate ===
In mid-February 1972, Stans resigned as the secretary of commerce to chair the Committee for the Re-Election of the President (CRP), Richard Nixon's re-election campaign. Money that he raised for the campaign was clearly used to finance some of the illegal Watergate activities. Stans denied any knowledge of what the money was used for, only that it was authorized to be spent.

On March 12, 1975, Stans pleaded guilty to three counts of violating the reporting sections of the Federal Election Campaign Act and two counts of accepting illegal campaign contributions. He was fined $5,000. The convictions were related to improperly giving campaign funds to G. Gordon Liddy, though Stans insisted that his guilt ended there and that he was not aware of Liddy's plan to use the money for what became the Watergate break in.

He later authored a book, The Terrors of Justice: The Untold Side of Watergate, in which he detailed his side of the Watergate story. Stans also wrote a book called "One of the Presidents' Men: Twenty Years With Eisenhower and Nixon" about his time serving in the Cabinets of two different presidential administrations.

== Personal life ==
Stans died at the Huntington Memorial Hospital in Pasadena, California, on April 14, 1998, at age 90, from complications of congestive heart failure.

Political offices
Preceded by Percival Brundage	Director of the Bureau of the Budget; 1958–1961	Succeeded by David E. Bell
Preceded by Cyrus Smith	United States Secretary of Commerce; 1969–1972	Succeeded by Peter Peterson
