= Oakhurst, New Jersey =

Place in Monmouth County, New Jersey, United States

- Census-designated place
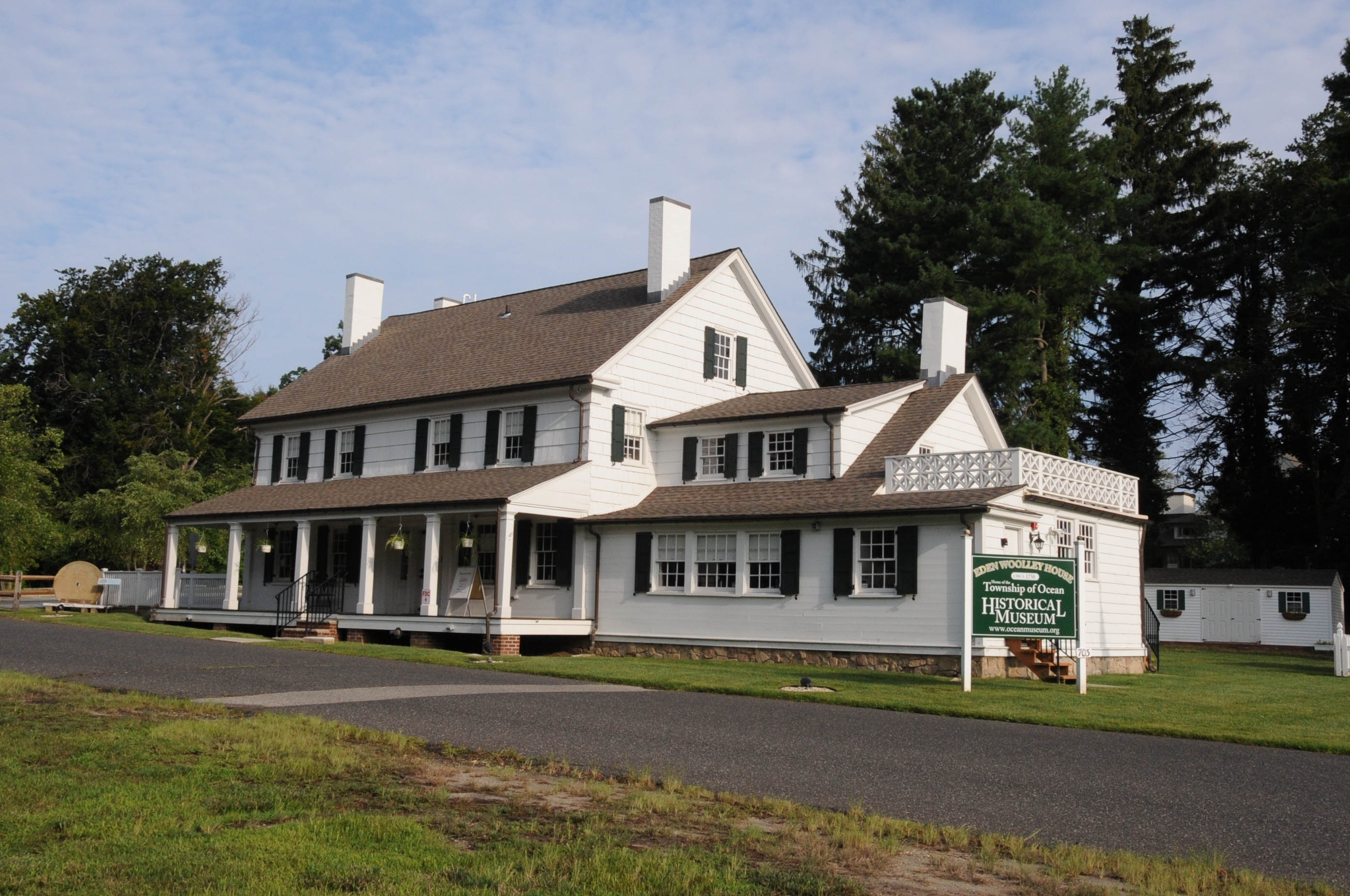
- Eden Wooley House, now the Ocean Township Historical Museum, in Oakhurst

- Location of Oakhurst in Monmouth County highlighted in red (left). Inset map: Location of Monmouth County in New Jersey highlighted in orange (right).

- Location in Monmouth County Location in New Jersey Location in the United States
- Coordinates: 40.261486°N 74.02655°W
- Country: United States
- State: New Jersey
- County: Monmouth
- Township: Ocean

Area
  - Total: 1.61 sq mi (4.18 km^{2})
  - Land: 1.61 sq mi (4.17 km^{2})
  - Water: 0.0039 sq mi (0.01 km^{2}) 0.16%
- Elevation: 46 ft (14 m)

Population (2020)
  - Total: 4,069
  - Density: 2,526.5/sq mi (975.48/km^{2})
- Time zone: UTC−05:00 (Eastern (EST))
  - Summer (DST): UTC−04:00 (Eastern (EDT))
- ZIP Code: 07755
- Area codes: 732/848
- FIPS code: 34-53790
- GNIS feature ID: 02389604

Oakhurst is an unincorporated community and census-designated place (CDP) in Ocean Township, Monmouth County, New Jersey, United States. As of the 2020 census, the CDP population was 4,069, making it the second most populated neighborhood in Ocean Township.

== Geography ==
Oakhurst is in eastern Monmouth County, in the northeast part of Ocean Township. The census-designated place is bordered to the west by New Jersey Route 35, to the north by West Park Avenue, to the east by Monmouth Road, and to the south by Deal Road. The unincorporated community of Oakhurst includes land to the north and east of the CDP.

Route 35 leads north 2.5 miles (4.0 km) to Eatontown and south 4.5 miles (7.2 km) to Neptune City. The Atlantic Ocean along the Elberon section of Long Branch is less than 2 miles (3 km) to the east.

According to the U.S. Census Bureau, the Oakhurst CDP has a total area of 1.614 square miles (4.180 km^{2}), including 0.003 square miles (0.008 km^{2}) of water (0.19%). The community is drained by Poplar Brook, which flows east to the Atlantic at Deal. Elevations in Oakhurst range from less than 20 feet (6.1 m) above sea level along Poplar Brook to over 60 feet (18 m) in the northern and southwestern parts of the community.

== Demographics ==
Historical population
Census	Pop.	Note	%±
1950	2,388		—
1960	4,374		83.2%
1970	5,558		27.1%
1990	4,130		—
2000	4,152		0.5%
2010	3,995		−3.8%
2020	4,069		1.9%
Population sources: 1950 1960 1970; 1980 1990 2000; 2010 2020

Oakhurst first appeared as an unincorporated community in the 1950 U.S. census. It did not appear in the 1980 U.S. census; and then was listed as a census designated place in the 1990 U.S. census.

=== Racial and ethnic composition ===
Oakhurst CDP, New Jersey – Racial and ethnic composition Note: the US Census treats Hispanic/Latino as an ethnic category. This table excludes Latinos from the racial categories and assigns them to a separate category. Hispanics/Latinos may be of any race.
Race / Ethnicity (NH = Non-Hispanic)	Pop 2000	Pop 2010	Pop 2020	% 2000	% 2010	% 2020
White alone (NH)	3,918	3,660	3,300	94.36%	91.61%	81.10%
Black or African American alone (NH)	31	51	62	0.75%	1.28%	1.52%
Native American or Alaska Native alone (NH)	0	0	5	0.00%	0.00%	0.12%
Asian alone (NH)	95	100	144	2.29%	2.50%	3.54%
Native Hawaiian or Pacific Islander alone (NH)	0	0	0	0.00%	0.00%	0.00%
Other race alone (NH)	3	2	34	0.07%	0.05%	0.84%
Mixed race or Multiracial (NH)	21	28	153	0.51%	0.70%	3.76%
Hispanic or Latino (any race)	84	154	371	2.02%	3.85%	9.12%
Total	4,152	3,995	4,069	100.00%	100.00%	100.00%

=== 2020 census ===
As of the 2020 census, Oakhurst had a population of 4,069. The median age was 40.4 years. 23.8% of residents were under the age of 18 and 18.7% were 65 years of age or older. For every 100 females there were 97.2 males, and for every 100 females age 18 and over there were 93.6 males age 18 and over.

100.0% of residents lived in urban areas, while 0.0% lived in rural areas.

There were 1,361 households in Oakhurst, of which 35.4% had children under the age of 18 living in them. Of all households, 63.8% were married-couple households, 11.4% were households with a male householder and no spouse or partner present, and 20.7% were households with a female householder and no spouse or partner present. About 16.3% of all households were made up of individuals and 10.2% had someone living alone who was 65 years of age or older.

There were 1,491 housing units, of which 8.7% were vacant. The homeowner vacancy rate was 0.7% and the rental vacancy rate was 12.9%.

=== 2010 census ===
The 2010 United States census counted 3,995 people, 1,372 households, and 1,125 families in the CDP. The population density was 2,480.5 people per square mile (957.7 people/km^{2}). There were 1,473 housing units at an average density of 914.6 units per square mile (353.1 units/km^{2}). The racial makeup was 94.64% (3,781) White, 1.35% (54) Black or African American, 0.05% (2) Native American, 2.53% (101) Asian, 0.00% (0) Pacific Islander, 0.45% (18) from other races, and 0.98% (39) from two or more races. Hispanic or Latino of any race were 3.85% (154) of the population.

Of the 1,372 households, 35.5% had children under the age of 18; 68.1% were married couples living together; 10.1% had a female householder with no husband present and 18.0% were non-families. Of all households, 14.4% were made up of individuals and 6.8% had someone living alone who was 65 years of age or older. The average household size was 2.91 and the average family size was 3.21.

23.9% of the population were under the age of 18, 9.5% from 18 to 24, 21.4% from 25 to 44, 30.9% from 45 to 64, and 14.4% who were 65 years of age or older. The median age was 42.5 years. For every 100 females, the population had 98.9 males. For every 100 females ages 18 and older there were 95.1 males.

=== 2000 census ===
As of the 2000 United States census there were 4,152 people, 1,397 households, and 1,176 families living in the CDP. The population density was 989.6 people/km^{2} (2,563 people/mi^{2}). There were 1,459 housing units at an average density of 347.7 units/km^{2} (901 units/mi^{2}). The racial makeup of the CDP was 96.10% White, 0.75% African American, 2.29% Asian, 0.31% from other races, and 0.55% from two or more races. Hispanic or Latino of any race were 2.02% of the population.

There were 1,397 households, out of which 42.8% had children under the age of 18 living with them, 73.0% were married couples living together, 8.9% had a female householder with no husband present, and 15.8% were non-families. 13.8% of all households were made up of individuals, and 6.4% had someone living alone who was 65 years of age or older. The average household size was 2.97 and the average family size was 3.28.

In the CDP the population was spread out, with 28.3% under the age of 18, 5.9% from 18 to 24, 27.7% from 25 to 44, 27.1% from 45 to 64, and 11.1% who were 65 years of age or older. The median age was 38 years. For every 100 females, there were 98.1 males. For every 100 females age 18 and over, there were 94.6 males.

The median income for a household in the CDP was $75,026, and the median income for a family was $78,206. Males had a median income of $56,756 versus $41,429 for females. The per capita income for the CDP was $27,235. About 2.7% of families and 2.4% of the population were below the poverty line, including 3.1% of those under age 18 and 2.6% of those age 65 or over.

== Transportation ==
New Jersey Transit offers train service on the North Jersey Coast Line at the Elberon station. NJ Transit bus service is available on the 832 and 837 local routes.

== Notable people ==
People who were born in, residents of, or otherwise closely associated with Oakhurst include:

- Lou Barbaro (1916–1976), professional golfer
- Michelle Davidson (born 1970), masters swimmer and a long distance, open water swimmer who accomplished the Triple Crown of Open Water Swimming, which includes crossing the English Channel and Catalina Channel, and circumnavigating Manhattan Island
- Norma Eberhardt (1929–2011), actress
- Rowland Hughes (1896–1957), director of the Office of Management and Budget from 1954 to 1956
- Chris Malachowsky (born 1959), electrical engineer who was one of the founders of the computer graphics company Nvidia
- Paul Palmieri (born 1970), entrepreneur and business leader in the mobile telecommunications and digital advertising industries
- Kenny Pickett (born 1998), American football quarterback who was drafted 20th overall in the 2022 NFL draft by the Pittsburgh Steelers
- Jeffrey K. Tulis (born 1950), political scientist known for work that conjoins the fields of American politics, political theory, and public law
