= Dodge Line =

Economic policy during the occupation of Japan

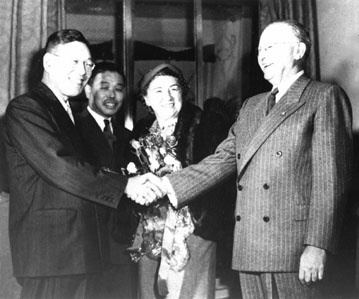
Hayato Ikeda meeting Dodge (right) in 1948

The Dodge Line or Dodge Plan was a financial and monetary contraction policy drafted by American economist Joseph Dodge for Japan to gain economic independence and stamp out inflation after World War II. It was announced on March 7, 1949. The Dodge Line was a major element of the so-called Reverse Course—a broader shift in the policies of the U.S.-led military occupation of Japan from an initial phase of demilitarizing and democratizing Japan to remilitarizing and economically strengthening Japan in response to rising Cold War tensions in East Asia.

== Background ==
On September 2, 1945, Japan surrendered to the Allied powers, bringing an end to World War II in Asia, and leading to the U.S.-led Allied Occupation of Japan. In the initial phases, the Occupation focused on liberalizing and democratizing Japanese society to ensure that Japan would never again be a threat to world peace. Within this permissive atmosphere, the Occupation allowed the Japanese to pursue an expansionary economic policy, but the economy quickly overheated, leading to hyperinflation. From September 1945 to August 1948, prices in Japan increased more than 700%, which precipitated major unrest across broad sectors of Japanese society.

Meanwhile, Cold War tensions were ramping up in Europe, where the Soviet occupation of Eastern European countries led Winston Churchill to give his 1946 "Iron Curtain" speech, as well as in Asia, where the tide was turning in favor of the Communists in the Chinese Civil War. These shifts in the geo-political environment led to a profound shift in U.S. government and Allied Occupation thinking about Japan, and rather than focusing on punishing and weakening Japan for its wartime transgressions, the focus shifted to rebuilding and strengthening Japan as a potential ally in the emerging global Cold War. Meanwhile on the Japanese domestic front, rampant inflation, food insecurity, and widespread poverty in the wake of Japan's defeat fostered the rapid expansion of militant leftist political parties and labor unions, leading Occupation authorities to fear that Japan was ripe for communist exploitation or even a communist revolution.

== Dodge's plan ==
In order to address the twin goals of strengthening Japan economically and disempowering the Japanese left by taming inflation, the Occupation brought in Detroit banker Joseph Dodge as an economic policy consultant. In February 1949, Dodge arrived in Japan to take stock of the situation, and on March 7, he announced his plan, known as the "Dodge Line." It recommended:

1. Balancing the national budget to reduce inflation
2. More efficient tax collection
3. Dissolving the Reconstruction Finance Bank because of its uneconomical loans
4. Decreasing the scope of government intervention
5. Fixing the exchange rate to 360 yen to one US dollar to keep Japanese export prices low

== Effects ==
These policies succeeded in getting Japan's rampant inflation under control, but caused significant short-term hardship for Japanese workers, leading to mass layoffs as the economy went into contraction, a painful period of economic adjustment known as the "Dodge squeeze." Japan was plunged into a severe recession (ja:安定恐慌), which did not end until the massive economic stimulus produced by U.S. military special procurements in Japan following the outbreak of the Korean War in 1950.

The fixed exchange rate of 360 yen to one dollar remained unchanged into the early 1970s, helping turbo-charge Japanese exports and fueling the Japanese economic miracle. While the Dodge Line managed to bring inflation under control, it was feared that it could harm Japan in the long run. Then came the ‘blessed rain from heaven’ in the form of $2 billion worth of war procurements (which amounted to 60% of Japan’s exports over the next three years). Exports tripled, production rose by over 70%, and Japan’s GNP grew at 12% yearly.

== Economic indicators and timeline ==
Macroeconomic conditions of Japan, 1945–1954
Year	GNP Growth Rate (%)	Inflation Rate (%)	Monetary Base Growth Rate (%)	Gov's Debt Growth Rate (%)	Trade balance to GNP Ratio (%)	Major Events
1945	—	51.1	148.2	9.0	—	Surrender of Japan (Aug.)
1946	—	364.5	67.6	418.3	—	Financial asset freeze (Feb.); zaibatsu dissolution
1947	8.4	195.9	132.9	75.9	-6.2	General strikes banned (Feb.); break up of monopolies, land reform, labor reform
1948	13.0	165.5	61.5	135.1	-3.8	
1949	2.2	63.3	0.3	56.0	-2.0	Dodge Plan (Feb.); Unification of multiple exchange rates to 360 yen per dollar (April); National Railway president Death (July)
1950	11.0	18.2	18.9	1.2	0.3	Korean war started (June)
1951	13.0	38.8	19.9	24.0	-1.9	Treaty of San Francisco Korea War armistice talk started
1952	11.0	2.0	13.8	16.8	-2.3	
1953	5.7	5.0	10.8	16.6	-4.5	Korean War armistice signed (July)
1954	6.1	6.5	-0.9	2.3	-2.2	
