= Frank Pace =

American governmental official and businessman

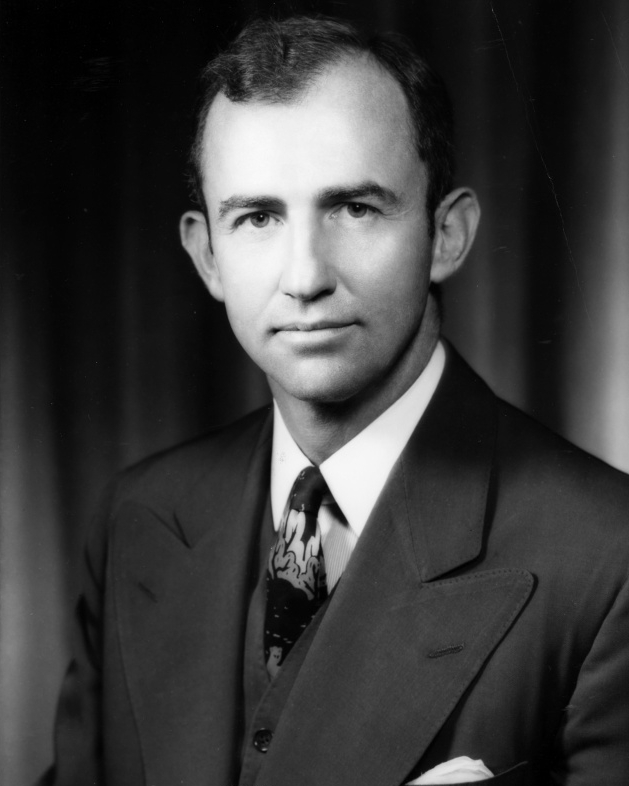
- Official portrait, 1950

3rd United States Secretary of the Army
- In office April 12, 1950 – January 20, 1953
- President: Harry S. Truman
- Preceded by: Gordon Gray
- Succeeded by: Robert T. Stevens

8th Director of the Bureau of the Budget
- In office February 1, 1949 – April 12, 1950
- President: Harry S. Truman
- Preceded by: James E. Webb
- Succeeded by: Fred Lawton

Personal details
- Born: July 5, 1912 Little Rock, Arkansas, U.S.
- Died: January 8, 1988 (aged 75) Greenwich, Connecticut, U.S.
- Party: Democratic
- Spouse: Margaret Morris Janney
- Children: 3
- Education: Princeton University (BA); Harvard University (LLB)
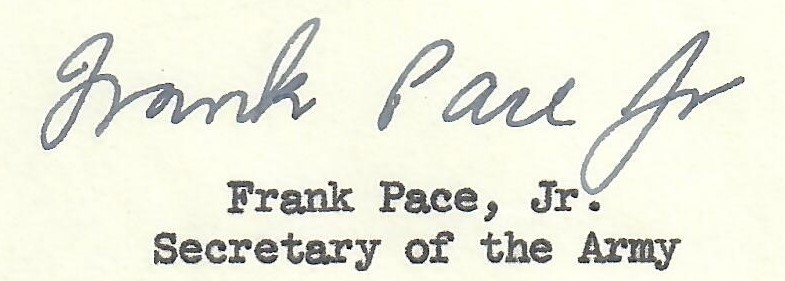
- Signature

Military service
- Branch/service: United States Army Air Forces
- Years of service: 1942–1945
- Rank: Major

Frank Pace Jr. (July 5, 1912 – January 8, 1988) was the 3rd United States Secretary of the Army and a business executive.

== Biography ==
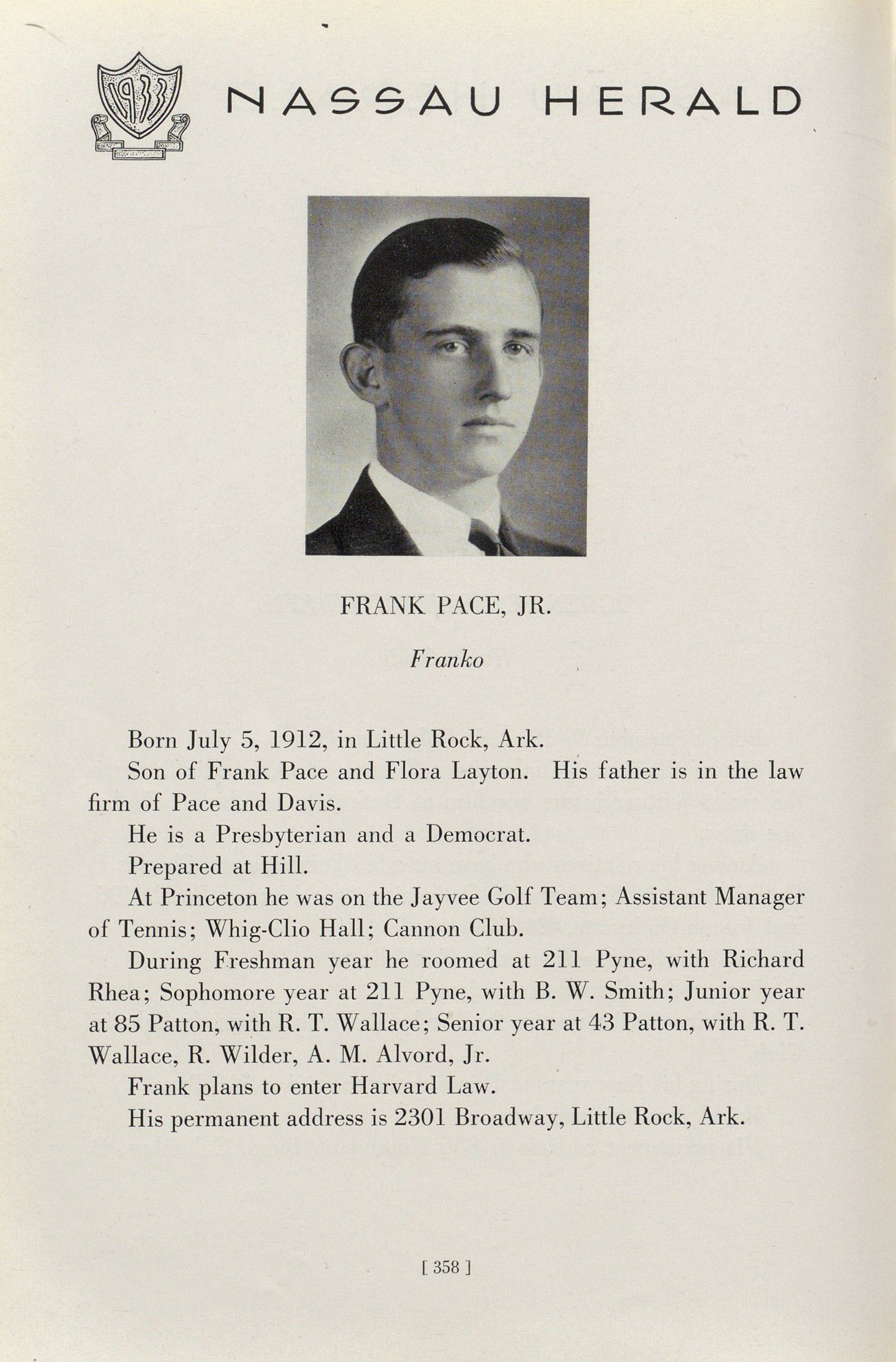
Pace in the Princeton University yearbook, 1933

Pace was born in Little Rock, Arkansas, and attended The Hill School, Pottstown, Pennsylvania. In 1933 he graduated from Princeton University, and in 1936 from Harvard Law School.

Pace entered public service in 1936 as an assistant district attorney in Arkansas. He moved onto the Arkansas Revenue Department in 1938. In 1942 he was commissioned into the United States Army Air Forces as a second lieutenant where he served until 1945 in the Air Transport Command, Army Air Corps, reaching the rank of Major.

After leaving the Army in 1945 he returned to public service as an assistant to the United States Attorney General, then later as executive assistant to the Postmaster General. He then moved in 1948 to the Bureau of the Budget, first as assistant director and then as director.

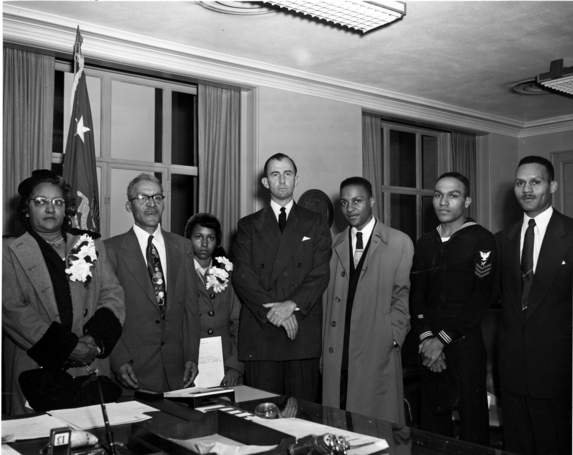
Pace (center) with the family of Medal of Honor recipient Cornelius H. Charlton, March 12, 1952

On April 12, 1950, he was appointed Secretary of the Army, where he served until January 20, 1953. In August 1950, to avert a threatened strike during the Korean War, President Truman ordered Pace to seize control of the nation's railroads.

He went on to serve as chief executive officer of General Dynamics Corporation from 1953 until 1962. He was selected as the administrator-designate of the Emergency Transport Agency; part of a secret group created by President Eisenhower in 1958 that would serve in the event of a national emergency that became known as the Eisenhower Ten.

In 1964, Pace joined David Rockefeller to launch the International Executive Service Corps, which was established to help bring about prosperity and stability in developing nations through the growth of private enterprise. Pace went on to serve as president of the IESC.

Pace was the first chairman of the Corporation for Public Broadcasting, from 1968 until 1972.

Pace appeared on the cover of Time magazine on January 20, 1958.

Pace worked for the International Executive Service Corps. In the early 1970s he worked for the first Executive Service Corps (ESC) as a Management Support Organization (MSO) in New York.

Pace died from a heart attack in Greenwich, Connecticut on January 8, 1988, at the age of 75.

== See also ==
- Pace-Finletter MOU 1952

Political offices
Preceded by James E. Webb	Director of the Bureau of the Budget; 1949–1950	Succeeded by Fred Lawton
Preceded by Gordon Gray	United States Secretary of the Army; 1950–1953	Succeeded by Robert T. Stevens
