= Michelle Davidson (swimmer) =

American swimmer (born 1970)

Personal information
- Born: 1970 (age 55–56) Neptune City, New Jersey, United States
- Home town: Oakhurst, New Jersey, United States

Sport
- Sport: Swimming
- Strokes: Long-distance swimming, open water swimming

Michelle Davidson (born 1970), is a U.S. Masters Swimmer and a long distance, open water swimmer. She is one of only 84 swimmers in the world who have ever accomplished the Triple Crown of Open Water Swimming, which includes crossing the English Channel and Catalina Channel, and circumnavigating Manhattan Island.

== Swimming ==
Born in 1970, Davidson grew up in the Oakhurst section of Ocean Township, Monmouth County, New Jersey, and graduated in 1989 from Ocean Township High School, where she was captain of the swimming team. She has been a resident of the Ocean Grove section of Neptune Township, New Jersey, and is employed as a teacher at Holmdel High School. She is one of only 84 swimmers in the world who have ever accomplished the Triple Crown of swimming. Either individually, or with her swimming partner Nancy Steadman Martin, she has made seven long distance swims between the years 2000 and 2010. These include:

- Swimming 21 miles (34 km) across the English Channel in 2004 in 13 hours 45 minutes,
- Swimming 28.5 miles (45.9 km) around the island of Manhattan in 2000, 2003 and 2007,
- Swimming southern California's 20.2 miles (32.5 km) Catalina Channel
- Completing the 22 mile Ederle Swim from Battery Park, NY to Sandy Hook, NJ in 2006 and 2010.

While known primarily for her long distance swims, she has been named to the U.S. Masters Swimming's list of All Americans on three occasions, having posted the fastest time in an event/age group in at least one of the organization's three official courses. Since 2003, Davidson has competed in 144 U.S. Masters Swimming short course events, winning 73 of these competitions (51%).

== Other sports ==
In addition to swimming, Davidson is world class paddle boarder who in 2004, was a member of a relay team that paddled from Cuba to Florida; has run five marathons in five states; competed in an Ironman competition; and has won the U.S. Lifeguard Association's "Run-Swim-Run" and Iron Woman competition.

Davidson was an Ocean Grove lifeguard for 26 years and the lifeguard manager for the 15 years.

March 28, 2016, Davidson and long time swim partner, Nancy Steadman Martin swam from Lanai to Maui Island Hawaii the new record setting time: 5 hours 5 minutes.
