= Clarence B. Randall =

American lawyer and businessman (1891–1967)

Clarence Belden Randall (March 5, 1891 – August 4, 1967) was an American lawyer and businessman. During the steel disputes of 1952, he served as a spokesman for the steel industry. He served as Chairman of the Board of Inland Steel Company and as an advisor to Presidents Dwight D. Eisenhower and John F. Kennedy.

== Biography ==
Randall was born in Newark Valley, New York, on March 5, 1891. He graduated from Harvard College in 1912 and Harvard Law School in 1915. He moved to Ishpeming, Michigan, where he was admitted to the Michigan bar, and met his wife, Emily. Randall completed his military training for the United States Army at Fort Sheridan. Randall served in France during World War I as a captain in the 35th and 85th Infantry Divisions. He and Emily married in 1917, after he returned from the war. Returning to Ishpeming, Randall continued practicing law. He began to work for Inland Steel in 1925. He became a vice president in 1930. In 1949, he was elected the president of the company. Randall lived in Winnetka, Illinois with his family. He served on the Winnetka School Board. Randall wrote several books including his memoir, Over My Shoulder.

During the 1952 steel strike, when President Harry S. Truman nationalized steel companies whose workers were threatening to strike, Randall gave a speech that was televised nationally attacking Truman and the United Steelworkers, criticizing them for "shocking distortions of fact". In 1953, Randall became the chairman of the board of Inland Steel. That year, President Dwight D. Eisenhower appointed Randall as Chairman of the Commission on Foreign Economic Policy, putting him in charge of studying the Reciprocal Tariff Act of 1934 and recommending changes. The commission recommended extending the act. He was elected to the American Academy of Arts and Sciences in 1954. He retired from Inland Steel in 1956, and traveled to Turkey on an economic mission on behalf of President Eisenhower. He was elected to the American Philosophical Society in 1957. Randall also served as an advisor to President John F. Kennedy, conducting an economic mission in Ghana, in which he assessed the Volta River Dam.

In July 1963, Randall received the Presidential Medal of Freedom from Kennedy.

Randall suffered a heart attack on August 1, 1967. He died on August 4, 1967, in a hospital in Ishpeming, Michigan.

== See also ==
- List of Presidential Medal of Freedom recipients
