= Commission on Foreign Economic Policy =

The U.S. President's Commission on Foreign Economic Policy (the Randall Commission) was established on August 7, 1953 by Public Law 215 entitled "Trade Agreements Extension Act of 1953" which extended the Trade Agreements Extension Act of 1951 for one year. On April 7, 1953 President Dwight D. Eisenhower requested that Congress extend for one year the Reciprocal Trade Agreements Act, a measure which had originally been passed in 1934. Under this act and its subsequent extensions, the President was authorized to negotiate agreements with other countries for tariff reduction. In his message of April 7, the President called for a commission to study U.S. foreign economic policy in general. Section 301 of this Act provided for a bipartisan commission which consisted of seventeen members: seven appointed by the President, five appointed from the Senate by the Vice President, and five from the United States House of Representatives by the Speaker. President Eisenhower appointed Clarence B. Randall, Chairman of the Board of Inland Steel Company, as Chairman of the Commission. The Commission was directed to examine and report on the subjects of international trade, foreign economic policy, and the trade aspects of national security and total foreign policy. It was to recommend appropriate policies, measures, and practices, based on its findings, in a report to Congress.

The Commission held an organizational meeting with President Eisenhower on September 22, 1953 and hearings began October 2, continuing through November 19, including sessions in Paris, France, November 9–12. Most of the hearings were closed except for public hearings on October 28–29 when representatives of national associations, trade unions, etc., presented their views on foreign trade. In order to limit the number of witnesses before the Commission, Randall sent out 15,000 letters asking for written statements from individual industries, labor unions, etc. He received of 300 statements in response to these letters.

The Commission staff, composed of specialists on various aspects of foreign economic policy, digested the written testimony and information provided by the Department of State, Department of Agriculture, and other agencies, in preparing 800 pages of staff papers upon which the Commission Report was based. This report was divided into twelve sections, such as Dollar Problem, Foreign Aid, Tariff and Trade, East-West Trade, etc. and was presented to Congress on January 23, 1954.

This Commission was dissolved on April 23, 1954, three months after it presented its report to Congress.
