= Joseph Dodge =

American banker (1890–1964)

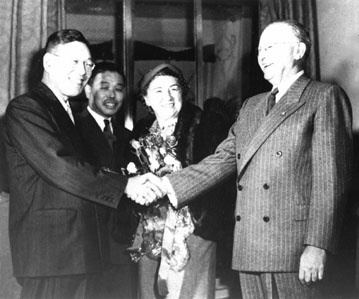
- Dodge (right) meets Hayato Ikeda, 1948

10th Director of the Bureau of the Budget
- In office January 22, 1953 – April 15, 1954
- President: Dwight D. Eisenhower
- Preceded by: Frederick Lawton
- Succeeded by: Rowland Hughes

Personal details
- Born: Joseph Morrell Dodge; November 18, 1890 Detroit, Michigan, U.S.
- Died: December 2, 1964 (aged 74) Detroit, Michigan, U.S.
- Party: Republican

Joseph Morrell Dodge (November 18, 1890 – December 2, 1964) was a chairman of the Detroit Bank, now Comerica. He later served as an economic adviser for postwar economic stabilization programs in Germany and Japan, headed the American delegation to the Austrian Advisory commission, and worked as President Dwight D. Eisenhower's director of the Bureau of the Budget.

Dodge formed economic reconstruction plans for West Germany after World War II, and implemented financial reforms in 1948. He later moved to Japan, having drafted another economic stabilization plan, widely known as the "Dodge Line", in December 1948, as the financial adviser to the Supreme Commander for the Allied Powers (SCAP), General Douglas MacArthur. Arriving in February 1949 to implement these reforms, Dodge served as a "lightning-rod" to redirect fiscal criticism away from MacArthur and chose to keep a low profile.

== Personal life and career ==
Dodge was the first of three children born to Joseph Cheeseman Dodge, a poster artist, and Gertrude Hester Crow. He grew up with his brother and sister on middle-class Kirby Street in Detroit, Michigan. Inspired by the hiking and camping trips his father often took him on, Dodge's earliest ambition was to be a forest ranger. His mother knew better stating, "I'm sure Joseph is going to be a banker. He is the only boy of his age who doesn't like to get his hands dirty." After graduating from Detroit Central High School in 1908, Dodge worked at the Standard Accident Insurance Company as a clerk until 1909, when he began work at the Central Savings Bank. He quickly rose through the ranks, starting as a messenger boy, then bookkeeper (while teaching himself accounting), then Michigan's youngest state bank examiner (at age 20). For five years Dodge excelled at his post so well as to attract the attention of Bank Commissioner Edward Doyle, who appointed him as his assistant.

In 1916, Dodge married Julia Jane Jeffers and was offered a job by Michigan's banker-Senator James Couzens at the Bank of Detroit as an operating officer. Shortly thereafter, in 1917, Dodge's previous employer Bank Commissioner Doyle asked him to assist his son Tom Doyle in running the nation's largest Dodge auto agency (Joseph Dodge was no kin to the car-making family). During his time as vice president and general manager of the Thomas J. Doyle Company, Dodge took up boxing. On one occasion, Dodge sought out and questioned a spare-parts dealer who had previously spoken scornfully of him. As his secretary recorded in her notebook, "The dealer made a wrong move and was suddenly flat on his back." Dodge's boxing coach later remarked, "If Mr. Dodge had only stuck to boxing instead of becoming a bank president, he might have made something of himself."

As discussed in a 1952 edition of Times Magazine - "Budget Observer", Dodge's personality could be described as "Unbending (he is 'Mr. Dodge' even to the Detroit Bank's vice president), outspoken (he told MacArthur: 'I'm no colonel bucking to be a brigadier-I can be objective, because the most I'll get out of this is a kick in the pants'), indefatigable ('my hobby is work'), Banker Dodge is an implacable anti-inflationist."

== Great Depression ==
In 1932, Dodge resigned due to the Great Depression, having bluntly stated, "Tom, there isn't enough money coming in to keep both of us. I'm leaving." He returned to banking as vice president of the First National Bank, which failed in 1933 with the national banking crisis. Despite this, Dodge helped organize the creation of the National Bank of Detroit and became president of the Detroit Bank in 1933. He remained president of the Detroit Bank until January 1953.

Dodge stuck to his ideals and business sense when running his new bank, even when it meant treading on toes here or there. "He once turned down a prominent businessman for a small loan when he learned that the man held some stock shares in margin. 'Anyone who buys on margin is a poor financial risk,' said Dodge, thus losing the loan applicants big corporate account." Nevertheless, his tight-shipped business archetype expanded the Detroit Bank's assets by ten times and drew in 380,000 accounts.

== World War II ==
During World War II, Dodge worked as the director of the headquarters staff division of Army Service Forces in 1941. He first began his work for the government acting as a price adjuster by monitoring defense contractors to prevent unnecessary government spending through price gougers and profiteers. In 1942, he served in this post first for the Army Air Force Price Adjustment Board for the Central Procurement District in the Midwest. Again in September 1943 Dodge worked shortly for the War Department, renegotiate war contracts. Later that year, Dodge was chairing the "Pentagon's topmost War Contracts Board", of whom "regulated the costs of defense procurement for six federal agencies, including the armed forces."

== Germany ==
After World War II, Dodge left for Berlin in August 1945 under General Lucius D. Clay as a financial expert and adviser to the U.S. military government in Germany. The first of Dodge's accomplishments in Germany was his reorganization of the banking system, effective in the U.S. occupation zone in 1947. Perhaps his most remarkable improvements was his plans for stabilization of the German currency. Dodge "proposed a 90% currency reduction, coupled with capital levies on real property to even out the burden of defeat."

Dodge's plans were only ever partially implemented in the British, French, and U.S. zones in June 1948, after two years of delay. This was due to disagreement among German occupying powers. These new implementations were meant to discourage hoarding and bartering, consequently stimulating consumption. The reforms had the additional effect of advancing the Soviet's Berlin Blockade, as they considered these new changes were further steps toward amalgamation of western occupation zones into a state matching western ideals.

== Austria ==
Once the Austrian Peace Treaty was convened upon, an advisory commission was established in order to resolve the disputes over reparation, frontier, and disposition of German assets in Austria. Before the implementation of either the banking or currency reforms in Germany, Dodge's attention was turned to Austrian affairs. President Harry S. Truman assigned Dodge to head the American delegation to the Austrian Advisory commission in May 1947, with a personal rank of Minister. Dodge also found himself serving as deputy of Austrian affairs to the Secretary of State George C. Marshall, at the London meeting of the Council of Foreign Ministers. In January 1948, he resigned from this post and from 1948 to 1951 "Dodge served as a member of the advisory committee on fiscal and monetary problems of the Economic Cooperation Administration, which directed the original Marshall Plan."

== Financial adviser to MacArthur ==
Perhaps Dodge's most significant and noteworthy accomplishment was that of his work with the economic revitalization of Japan. He first arrived in Japan February 1949, leading a U.S. mission to rehabilitate the Japanese economy, as the financial adviser to the Supreme Commander for the Allied Powers. His position, granted by President Truman, carried the personal rank of Minister. Despite his relative success in Germany, prior to this Dodge had declined the role as SCAP financial adviser two times even after a heated meeting with President Truman. He confessed, "I see no quick or easy answers. They are inherently missing."

The U.S. mission was oriented away from liberal "oppression", through "recognition of the equality of women, new laws supporting labor unions and the right to strike, and educational reforms, among other challenges". Japanese foreign exchange earnings were drastically limited by high priced exports, making them uncompetitive in world marketing. The zaibatsu were able to pay off company debts and more easily acquire smaller competing companies, due to the devaluing of the yen through runaway inflation. This also, consequently, priced them out of exportation marketing. From September 1945 to August 1948 prices rose by 700% primarily due to, as Dodge suspected, deliberate policies of postwar Japanese governments.

The Dodge mission, as a product of American ambitions in Japan, was to alleviate Japan from their rapid inflation rates by imposing a regime of fiscal austerity to balance the Japanese budget, establish a single exchange rate for the yen, and abolish the black market. A month after his arrival in Tokyo, Dodge submitted his revised proposal for economic stabilization. "The Dodge Line was cast; it centered on the following four objectives:

1. balancing the consolidated national budget;
2. establishing the U.S. Aid Counterpart Fund in place of the lending operations of the RFB;
3. establishing a single foreign exchange rate; and
4. decreasing government intervention into the economy, especially through subsidies and price controls."

== United States Budget Director ==
After President Eisenhower's election in 1952, Dodge was appointed his director of the Bureau of Budget in 1953 with cabinet-level status, the two having met through General Lucius Clay. Dodge attributed his new job as Budget director to "being taken by the scruff of the neck and thrown into a basket of snakes." Dodge and Eisenhower shared paralleled priority to curbing inflation by reducing government spending. Prior to the revised budget for fiscal year 1954, that Dodge helped formulate, former president Harry S. Truman had a projected deficit of $10 billion. Dodge was able to reduce this deficit by half during the fifteen months he was in office.

Dodge accomplished this by making use of every conceivable revenue, no matter how supposedly insubstantial. For one, he required all government agencies rank proposed programs and cut low-priority spending. Additionally, Dodge rose the rent in Government housing, admissions to national parks, and even told agencies to charge for supplying copies of records. He forbade government agencies and departments from filling vacant positions unless absolutely necessary. Construction work was reduced to only that which was critical. He even refused to replace government cars unless they were six years old and had 60,000 miles of service. Dodge himself never replaced his own official car. "This is something you do all the time in business. But the subtractive process had all but disappeared in the government until we restored it." The New Look was the administration department's attempt to balance national defense needs with those of a healthy economy. Dodge, being the first director of budget to also hold a membership in the cabinet and National Security Council, strongly supported the New Look. Ultimately, Dodge successfully removed $12 billion of extraneous government spending.

Despite his apparent success, Dodge was unable to meet the balanced budget goals he had aimed for. 70% of government spending was devoted toward national security programs such as the United States Department of Defense, the mutual security pacts, and atomic energy. Similarly, existing legislation claimed another 20% of funds. Finally, the government had to continue paying interest on their national debt, another 8%. The last federal budget Dodge attempted to balance, before his resignation in March 1954, was fiscal 1955, which he was ultimately unable to balance even with a $5 billion reduction in defense spending through the New Look. Regardless, many considered his work a reassertion of control over the federal budget.

== Final work and resignation ==
Dodge returned as chairman to the Detroit Bank briefly before accepting several presidential delegations to both government committees and advisory boards. Dodge was reviewing long-range American plans for foreign economic aid programs in September 1954 and reappointed as President Eisenhower's special assistant three months later. As such, he was appointed the new cabinet-level position as chairman of the Council on Foreign Economic Policy from 1954 to 1956. In June 1956, Dodge became chairman of the reorganized Detroit Bank and Trust Company who had merged with three local financial institutions and whose assets exceeded $1 billion. Under request of Eisenhower, he served as a member of the Special Committee to Study the Military Assistance Program from 1958 to 1959 as well as a consultant to the National Security Council in 1959.

Dodge's final public service was in the Tractors for Freedom Committee, who tried to trade farm equipment as ransom for prisoners from the Bay of Pigs invasion, acting as their treasurer in 1961.

== Awards ==
Despite never pursuing post-secondary education, Dodge was awarded Honorary Doctorates of Law from Wayne and Michigan Universities. Also, for his accomplishments as financial adviser to the Office of Military Government in Berlin and as General Lucius D. Clay's finance director for American forces in Germany, Dodge was awarded the Medal of Merit on September 18, 1946. Later, he was awarded the Exceptional Civilian Service Medal in 1950, by the Department of the Army, "for making possible a stabilization program unparalleled in modern history," i.e. specifically for his economic stabilization plans in Japan. Three years before his death, Dodge was decorated with the Grand Cordon Order of the Rising Sun by Emperor Hirohito on the tenth anniversary of Japan's postwar independence, on April 28, 1962, in recognition of his services.

Political offices
Preceded by Frederick Lawton	Director of the Bureau of the Budget; 1953–1954	Succeeded by Rowland Hughes
