= Rowland Hughes =

American government official (1896–1957)

11th Director of the Bureau of the Budget
- In office April 16, 1954 – April 1, 1956
- President: Dwight D. Eisenhower
- Preceded by: Joseph Dodge
- Succeeded by: Percival Brundage

Personal details
- Born: Rowland Roberts Hughes; March 28, 1896 Oakhurst, New Jersey, U.S.
- Died: April 2, 1957 (aged 61) San Francisco, California, U.S.
- Party: Republican
- Education: Brown University (BA)

Rowland Roberts Hughes (1896–1957) was a director of the United States' Office of Management and Budget from April 16, 1954, until April 1, 1956. Hughes, known for his distinctive black eye patch, was called "the logical man" in a 1956 Time Magazine cover story.

Hughes was born in Oakhurst, New Jersey, and grew up a devout Christian Scientist. He attended Brown University. After graduating from college in 1917, he went to work for the National City Bank of New York. For several years he was assigned to various overseas branches of the bank, meeting his wife Dorothy in 1918 while working for the bank in Shanghai. He finally returned to work at the bank's headquarters in New York City in 1927. Hughes and his family resided in the Sutton Manor community of New Rochelle, New York, during this period of career growth and professional achievement in banking.

In April 1953, Hughes was appointed deputy director of the Bureau of the Budget. He became director of the bureau in April 1954 following the resignation of Joseph Dodge. As director, Hughes was responsible for preparing the national budget of the U.S. government. Due to his efforts the 1956 budget produced a surplus. This was the first balanced budget of President Dwight D. Eisenhower's administration.

Hughes retired from government service in April 1956 and died of arteriosclerosis on April 2, 1957, in San Francisco, California.

Political offices
Preceded by Joseph Dodge	Director of the Bureau of the Budget; 1954–1956	Succeeded by Percival Brundage
