= Mark Esper =

American politician and manufacturing executive (born 1964)

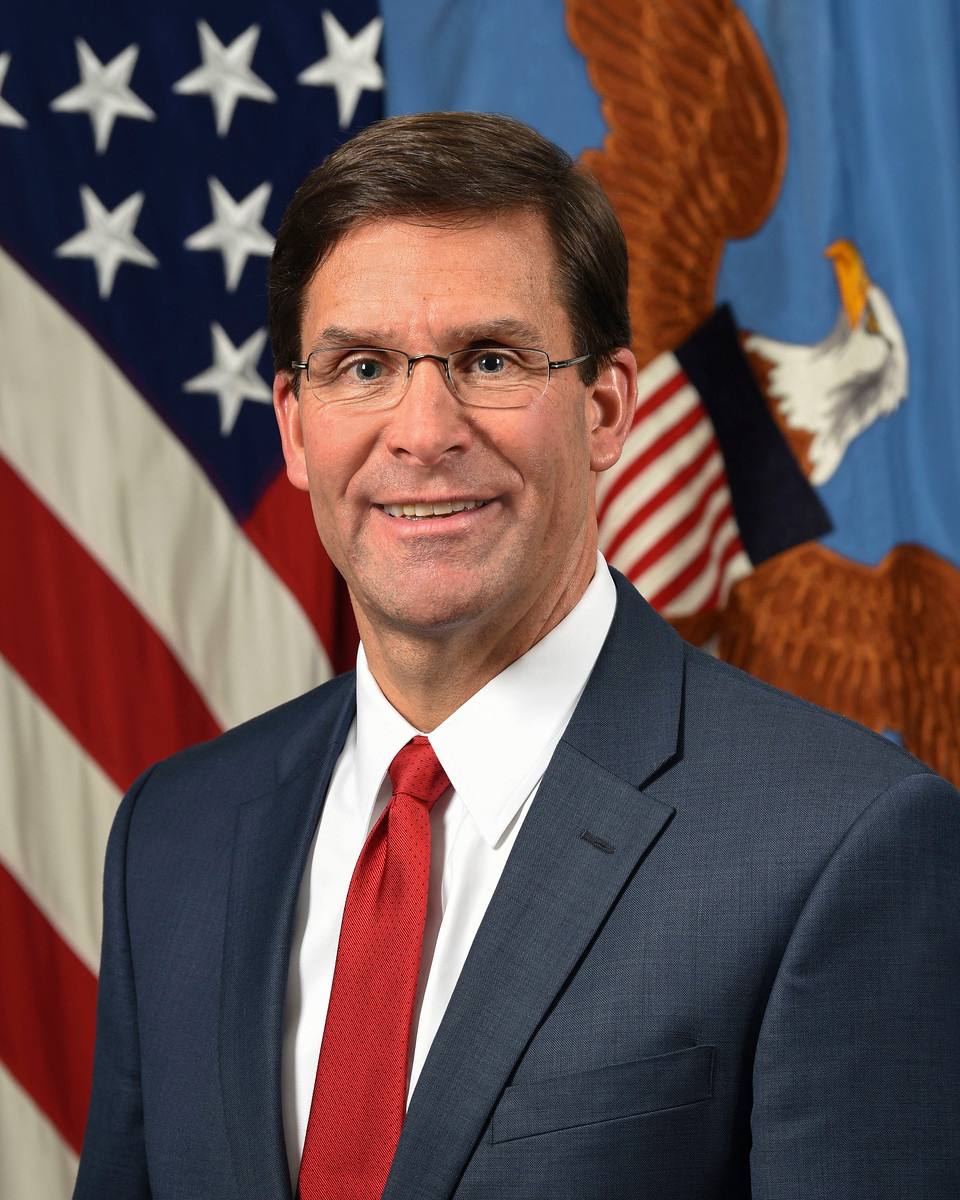
- Official portrait, 2019

27th United States Secretary of Defense
- In office July 23, 2019 – November 9, 2020
- President: Donald Trump
- Deputy: Richard V. Spencer (acting); David Norquist
- Preceded by: Jim Mattis
- Succeeded by: Lloyd Austin
- In office June 24, 2019 – July 15, 2019; Acting
- President: Donald Trump
- Deputy: David Norquist (acting)
- Preceded by: Patrick M. Shanahan (acting)
- Succeeded by: Richard V. Spencer (acting)

23rd United States Secretary of the Army
- In office November 20, 2017 – July 23, 2019 (Note: McCarthy served in an acting capacity from June 24, 2019 – July 15, 2019 while Esper served as Acting U.S. Secretary of Defense.)
- President: Donald Trump
- Deputy: Ryan McCarthy
- Preceded by: Ryan McCarthy (acting)
- Succeeded by: Ryan McCarthy

Personal details
- Born: Mark Thomas Esper; April 26, 1964 (age 62) Uniontown, Pennsylvania, U.S.
- Party: Republican
- Spouse: Leah Lacy (m. 1989)
- Children: 3
- Relatives: George Esper (uncle)
- Education: United States Military Academy (BS); Harvard University (MPA); George Washington University (PhD)
- Civilian awards: Department of Defense Medal for Distinguished Public Service (two awards)
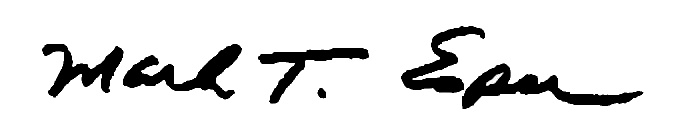
- Signature
- Website: Official website

Military service
- Branch/service: United States Army
- Years of service: 1986–2007
- Rank: Lieutenant Colonel
- Unit: 101st Airborne Division; 82nd Airborne Division; Virginia Army National Guard; D.C. Army National Guard; United States Army Reserve
- Commands: B/3-325 Airborne Battalion Combat Team, Vicenza, Italy
- Battles/wars: Gulf War
- Military awards: Legion of Merit; Bronze Star Medal; Meritorious Service Medal; Combat Infantryman Badge; Kuwait Liberation Medal

Academic background
- Thesis: The role of Congress in the development of the United States' strategic nuclear forces, 1947–1968 (2008)
- Esper's voice Esper on the National Guard's response to the George Floyd riots and his role in the walk to St. John's Church. Recorded June 3, 2020

Mark Thomas Esper (born April 26, 1964) is an American politician and manufacturing executive who served as the 27th United States secretary of defense from 2019 to 2020. A member of the Republican Party, he had previously served as the 23rd U.S. secretary of the Army from November 2017 to July 2019.

A West Point graduate, Esper joined the United States Army and saw combat during the Gulf War as an infantry officer with the 101st Airborne Division. He later served in the 82nd Airborne Division and the Army National Guard. After leaving military service, he held several prominent roles, including chief of staff at the Heritage Foundation; a senior congressional staffer; a deputy assistant secretary of defense; and a senior executive for the Aerospace Industries Association, the Global Intellectual Property Center, and the U.S. Chamber of Commerce. Immediately before joining the Trump administration, Esper served as vice president of government relations at defense contractor Raytheon.

In 2017, he joined the Trump administration as the 23rd secretary of the Army. In 2019, Esper was named acting defense secretary; he was confirmed shortly afterwards as the 27th defense secretary by the United States Senate with a vote of 90–8. He was dismissed from the office by President Donald Trump in a Twitter posting on November 9, 2020 due to disagreements about the integrity of the 2020 presidential election.

== Early life and education ==
Esper was born on April 26, 1964, in Uniontown, Pennsylvania, the son of Pauline "Polly" Reagan and Thomas Joseph Esper. His father was a member of the Maronite Church. His paternal grandfather was an immigrant from Lebanon, and his uncle was war journalist George Esper.

Esper graduated from Laurel Highlands High School outside Uniontown in 1982. He received his Bachelor of Science in engineering from the United States Military Academy in 1986. Esper was a dean's list student at West Point and received the Douglas MacArthur Award for Leadership. He received a master's degree in public administration from Harvard Kennedy School in 1995 and a doctorate in public policy from George Washington University in 2008. His doctoral dissertation was titled The role of Congress in the development of the United States' strategic nuclear forces, 1947–1968, and it was advised by James Lebovic.

== Career ==
Esper served as an infantry officer with the 101st Airborne Division and deployed with the "Screaming Eagles" for the Gulf War. His battalion—the 3rd Battalion, 187th Infantry Regiment, the "Rakkasans"—was part of the famous "Hail Mary" deep into southern Iraq that helped lead to the defeat of the Iraqi Army. He later commanded an airborne rifle company in Europe and served as an Army fellow at the Pentagon. Esper served on active duty for more than ten years before moving to the Army National Guard and later the Army Reserve, rising to the rank of lieutenant colonel. According to his memoir and personal website, Esper is Ranger, Airborne, Air Assault, Jumpmaster, and Pathfinder qualified, and completed Army courses ranging from Jungle Expert in Panama to the Command & General Staff College in Fort Leavenworth, Kansas. Esper is a two-time recipient of the Department of Defense Medal for Distinguished Public Service. Among his military awards and decorations are the Legion of Merit, Bronze Star Medal, Kuwait Liberation Medal, and the Combat Infantryman Badge.

Esper was chief of staff at the Heritage Foundation, a conservative think tank, from 1996 to 1998. From 1998 to 2002, Esper served as a senior professional staffer for the Senate Foreign Relations Committee and the Senate Governmental Affairs Committee. He was also a senior policy advisor and legislative director for U.S. Senator Chuck Hagel. He was policy director for the House Armed Services Committee from 2001 to 2002. From 2002 to 2004, Esper served in George W. Bush's administration as deputy assistant secretary of defense for negotiations policy, where he was responsible for a broad range of nonproliferation, arms control and international security issues. He was director for national security affairs for the U.S. Senate under Majority Leader Bill Frist from 2004 to 2006.

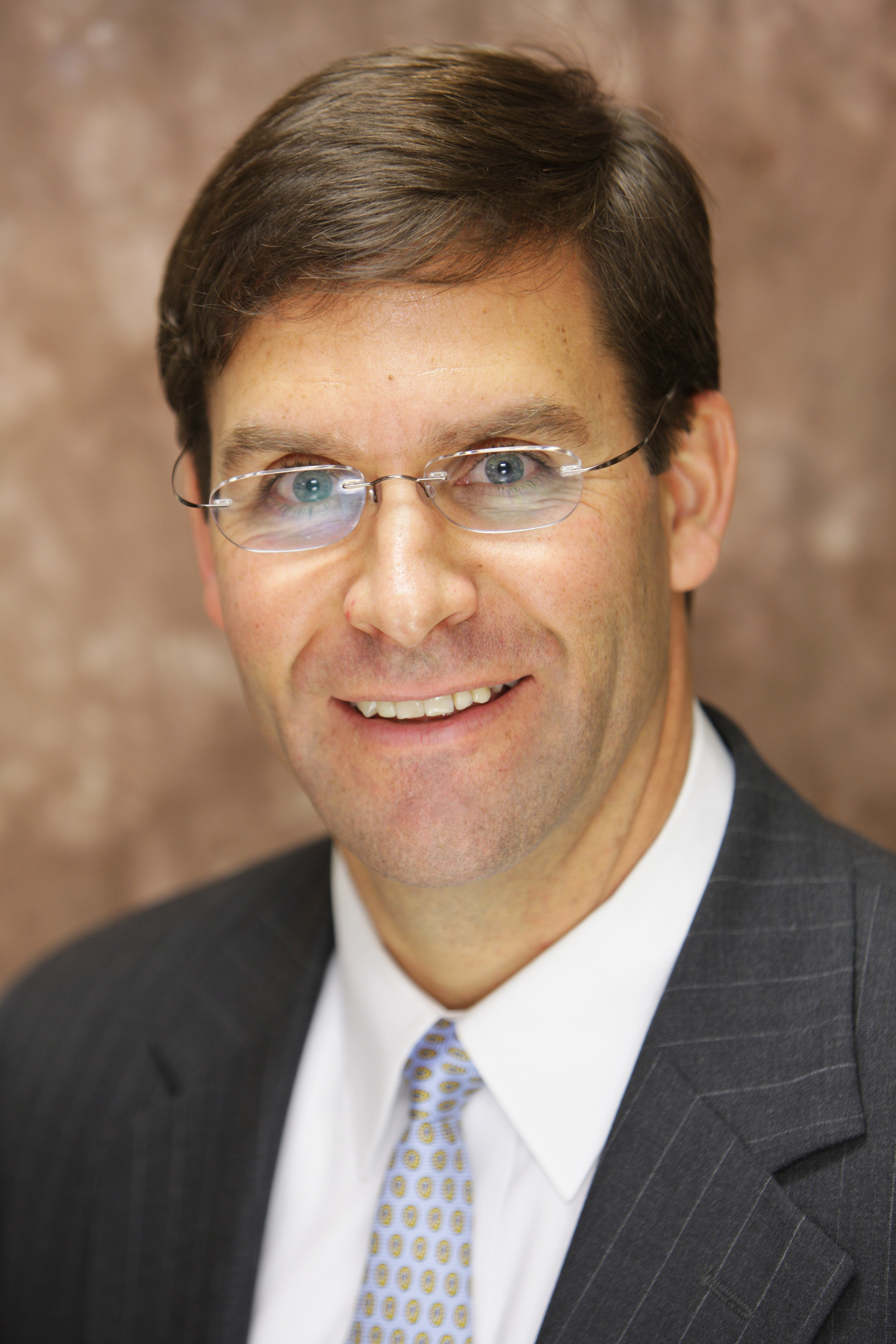
Esper in 2008

Esper was executive vice president at the Aerospace Industries Association in 2006 and 2007. From September 2007 to February 2008, Esper served as national policy director to U.S. Senator Fred Thompson in his 2008 presidential campaign. During that same period, Esper was a Senate-appointed commissioner on the U.S.-China Economic and Security Review Commission. From 2008 to 2010, Esper served as executive vice president of the Global Intellectual Property Center and vice president for Europe and Eurasia at the U.S. Chamber of Commerce. He was hired as vice president of government relations at defense contractor Raytheon in July 2010. Esper was recognized as a top corporate lobbyist by The Hill in 2015 and 2016. Esper's departure from Raytheon included a deferred compensation package after 2022.

== Secretary of the Army ==
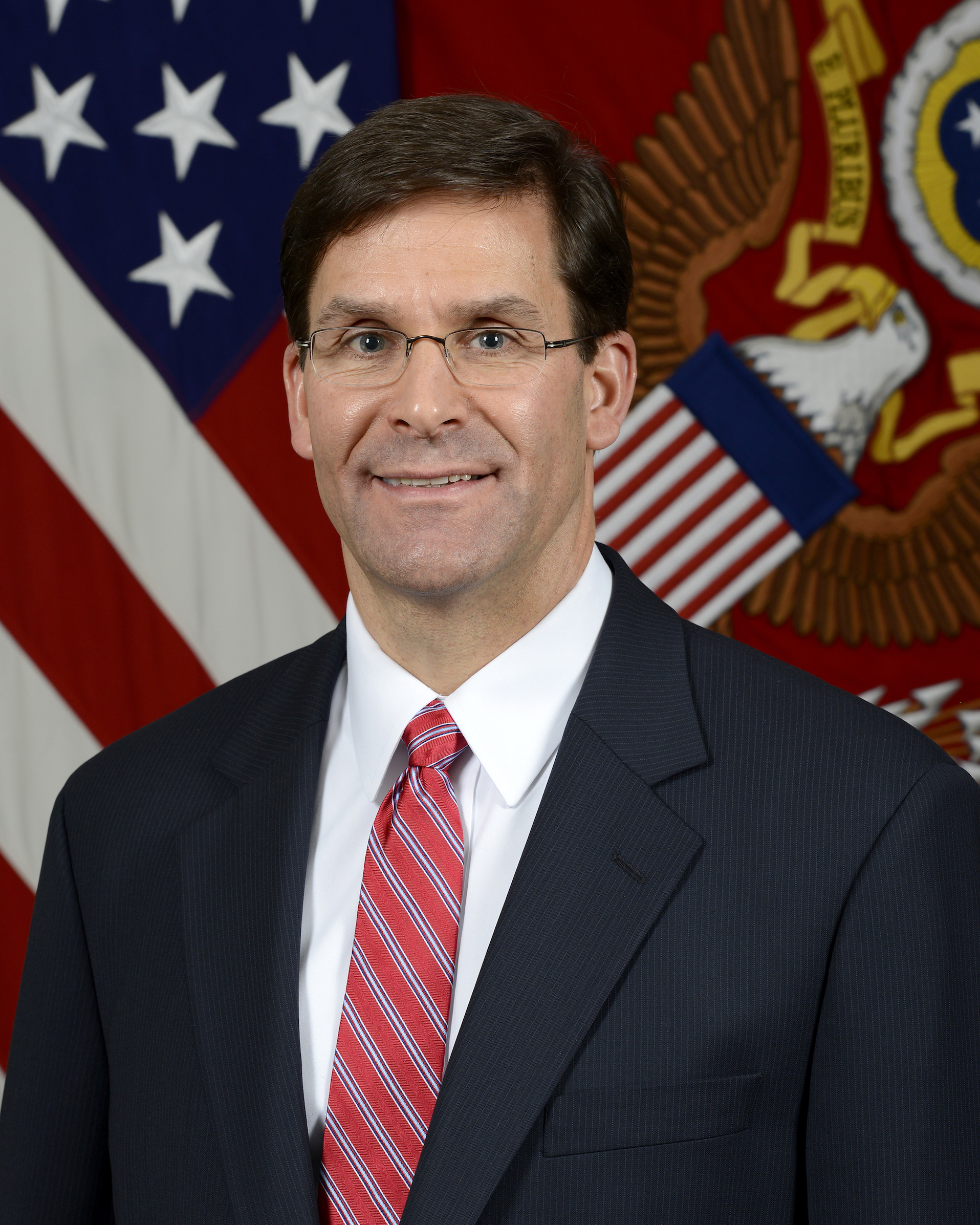
Secretary of Army Mark Esper, 2017–2019

President Donald Trump announced his intention to nominate Esper as Secretary of the Army on June 19, 2017. He was Trump's third nominee for the position, following the withdrawals of Vincent Viola and Mark E. Green. He was confirmed to this post by an 89–6 vote of the U.S. Senate on November 15, 2017 and sworn in on November 20, 2017.

During his confirmation hearing before the Senate Armed Services Committee in November 2017, Esper said that he would have three priorities as Army secretary: readiness, modernization (including of the military acquisition process and personnel system), and efficiency. He identified taking care of soldiers, their families, and Department of the Army civilians as an enduring priority.

=== Army vision ===
In mid-2018, Esper published a new Army vision that outlined the goals he wanted to achieve by 2028, as well as the ways and means to get there. The Vision focused the service on China as the pacing threat in a future high-intensity conflict. The top line goals were growing the force to more than 500,000 active-duty soldiers, building a talent-based "perform or out" personnel system, re-engineering the Army acquisition system by establishing a "Futures Command" to modernize the force, and scouring the service's budget to pay for these improvements.

=== Recruiting reform ===
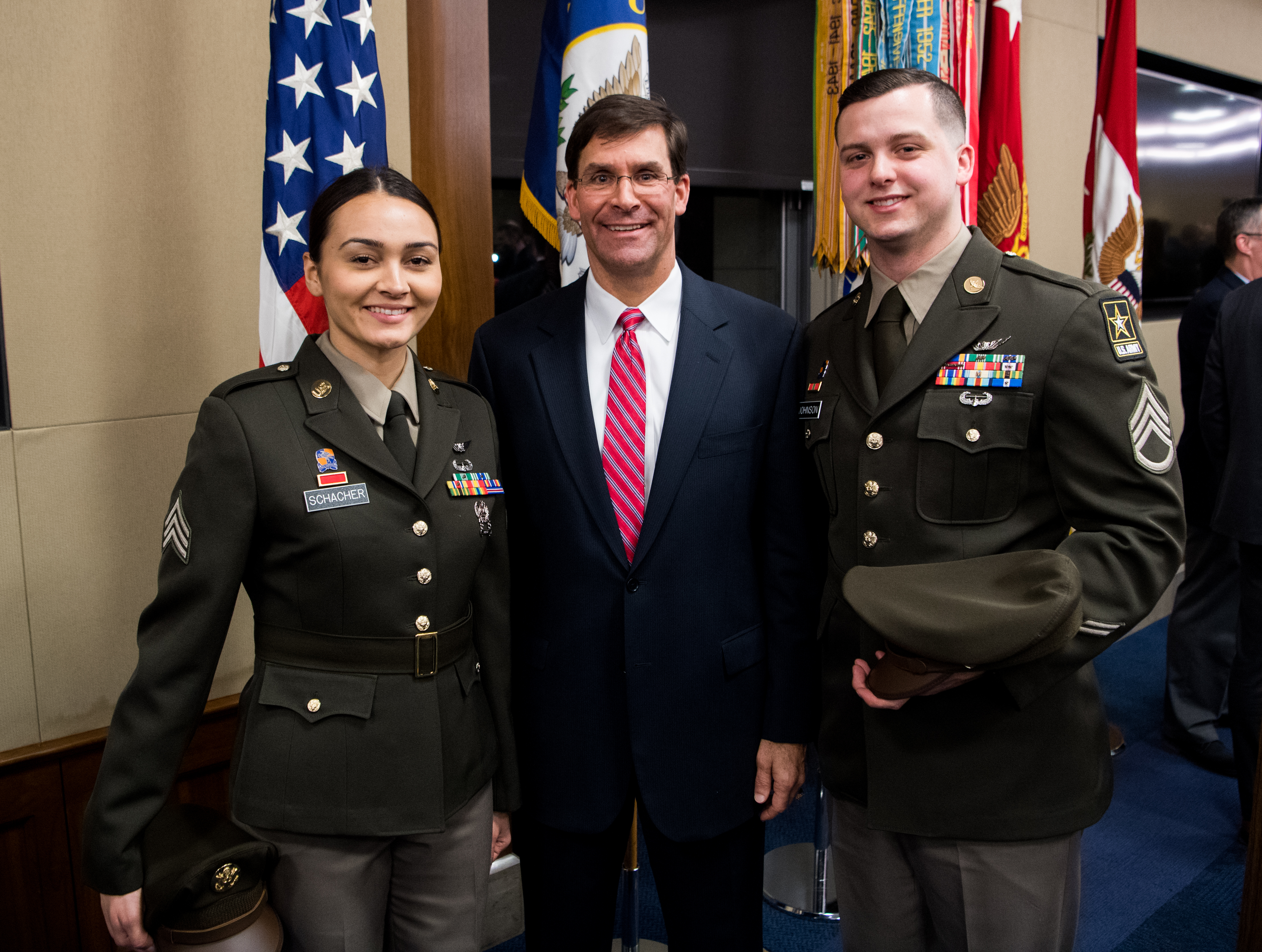
Esper championed the return of the Army's iconic "pinks and greens" uniform from World War II as a way to increase morale and pride in the service.

After missing its recruiting goal in 2017, Esper and his leadership team pursued an overhaul of the service's recruiting enterprise, with a stated focus on growing the force and emphasizing quality over quantity. The second part of this approach entailed a series of actions aimed at raising recruit standards, such as limiting waivers for applicants with histories of drug use, bad conduct, or mental health issues, and reducing by half the number of recruits that came from the lowest quality tier. At the same time, the Army hired a new marketing firm to refresh its overall approach with a business-like focus on specific objectives. This was complemented by an Army push into online outreach and a variety of social media, such as an Army eSports and CrossFit team, all of which helped Army recruiting during the COVID pandemic. Esper also brought back the World War II–era "pinks and greens" uniform as a rebranding initiative and morale booster for recruiters. In late 2018, the Army developed a "22 City" initiative that put a recruiting focus on major U.S. cities that were traditionally underserved, had little interaction with the U.S. military, and produced a lower-than-expected number of recruits annually. The aim was to expand these markets by dramatically increasing the number of Army recruiters, advertising, and visits by senior Army leaders. All of these initiatives began seeing positive results by mid-2019.

=== Army readiness ===
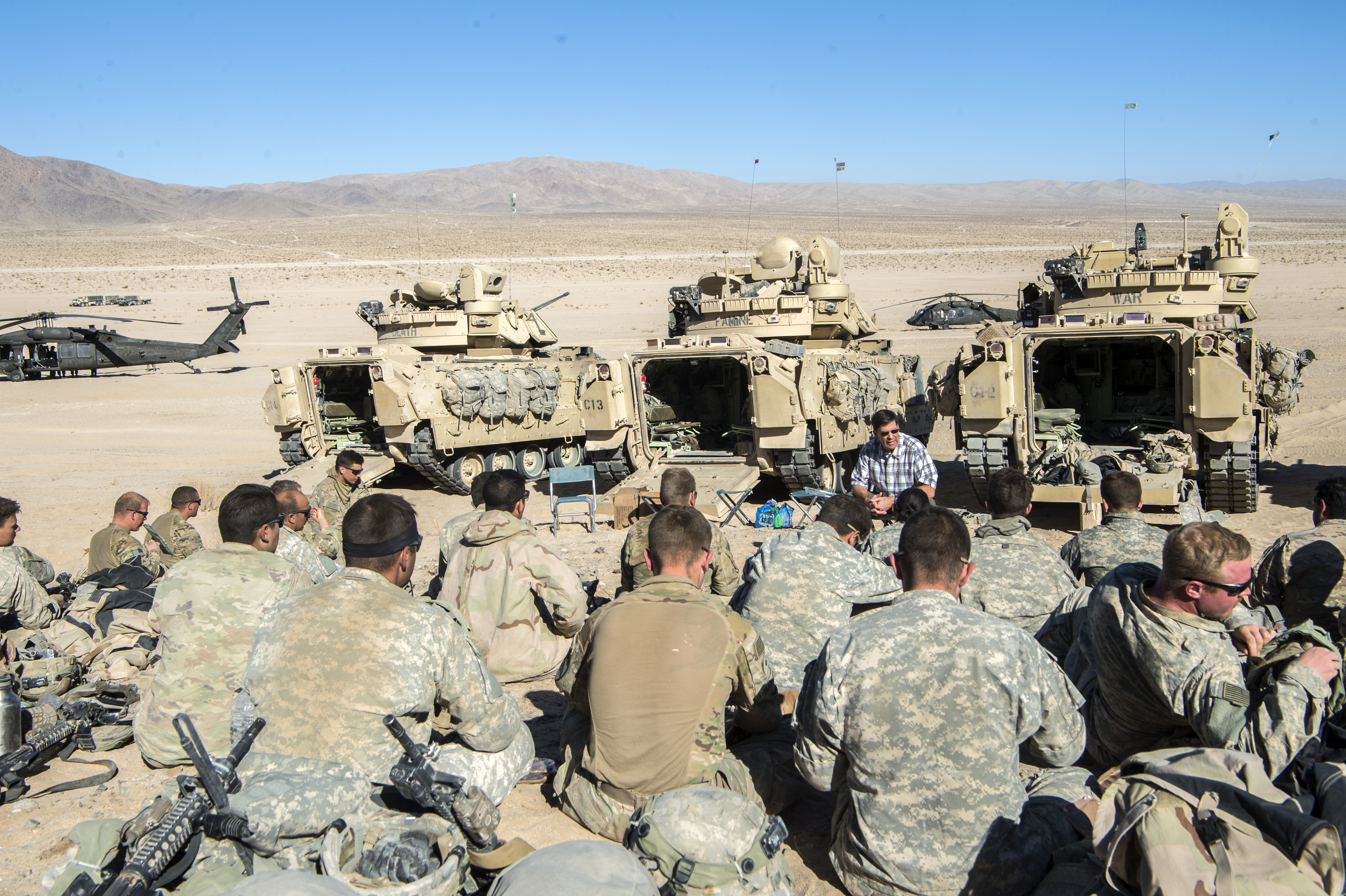
Mark Esper talks with soldiers of the 1st Armored Brigade Combat Team, 1st Cavalry Division, during their rotation to the National Training Center. (U.S. Army photo by Staff Sgt. Brandy N. Mejia)

In early 2017, the Army's readiness was at a low point when it came to fighting a near-peer threat like China or Russia. Only a few out of the Army's thirty-one active-duty brigade combat teams (BCTs) were fully ready to deploy. To address these issues, Esper pursued several initiatives to improve individual and unit readiness. In the spring of 2018, several dozen mandatory training, inspection, and reporting requirements were eliminated. The aim was to reduce those tasks directed from higher echelons that prevented junior officers and NCOs from training their soldiers as they saw best. With regard to unit training, Army forces were directed to focus on high-intensity combat operations against near-peer adversaries (e.g., China and Russia). To both drive and measure success, exercises at the Army's premier National Training Center (NTC) were geared exclusively to these types of operations (which included new forms of warfare such as drone operations) and unit rotations to the NTC were maximized for the first time in years. Other initiatives to improve Army readiness included a new health and physical fitness regime, increases in training dollars, updated policies regarding individual deployability, and personnel changes that kept units together longer. By the summer of 2019, it was reported that the number of non-deployable soldiers was reduced by 65%, with a 250% increase in the number of Army BCTs considered combat ready.

=== Overhaul of initial entry training ===
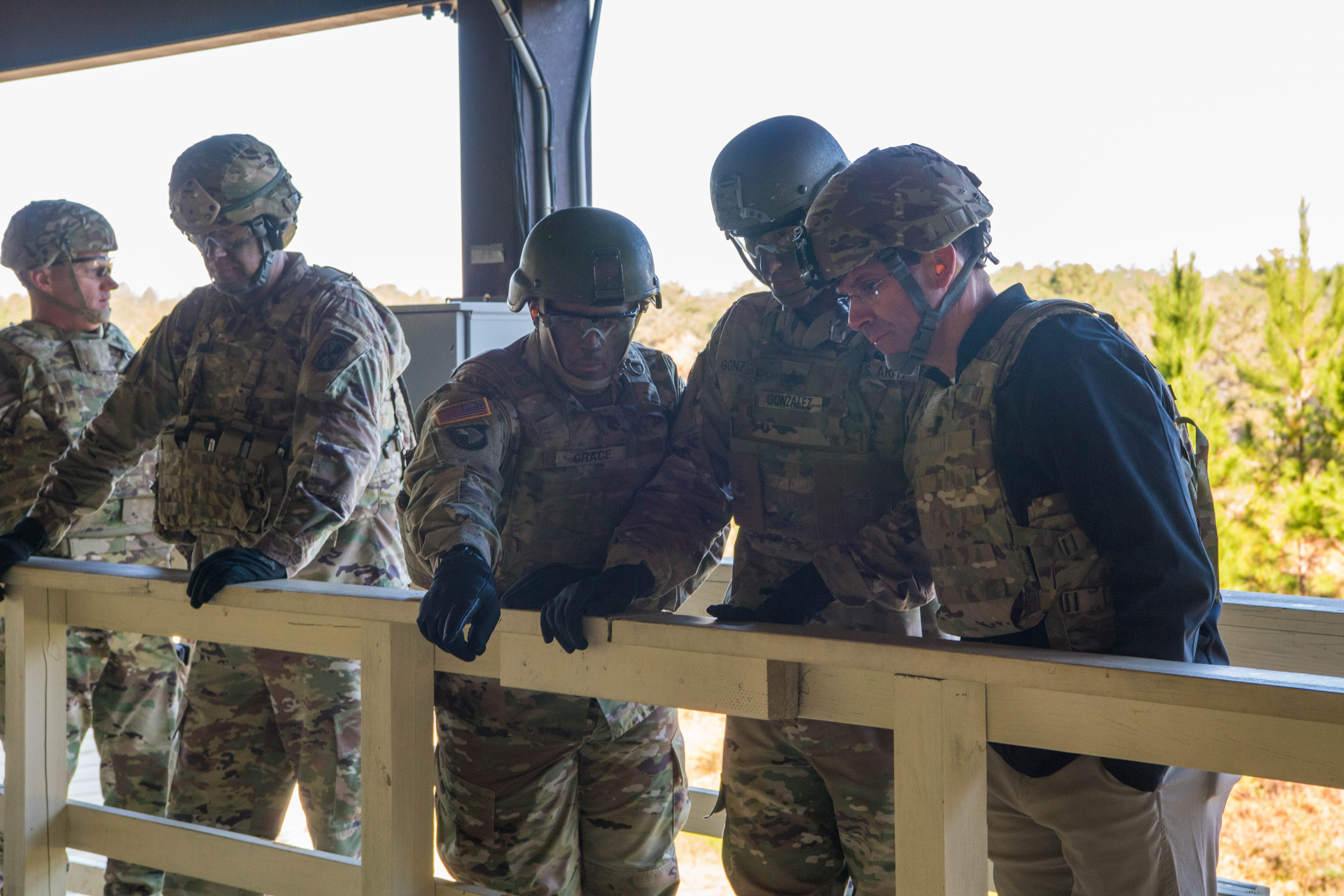
Esper visits Fort Benning, Georgia, in November 2018, where he conducted ACFT drills with student officers, visited the 75th Ranger Regiment, and watched new soldiers in the recently lengthened Infantry OSUT course conduct live fire urban warfare training. (U.S. Army photo by Staff Sgt. Nicole Mejia)

Esper launched a reform initiative in 2018 to improve initial entry training for combat soldiers. His directive extended basic and advanced infantry training by over 50 percent, to twenty-two weeks, making it one of the longest initial training programs in the world and the first major overhaul of the Army's initial training since the 1970s. The additional training time allowed the Army to broaden, lengthen, and deepen weapons training, vehicle-platform familiarization, combatives instruction, field training, land navigation, and night operations, while adding a 40-hour combat-lifesaver certification course and water survival training, among other things.

Initial reports in early 2019 showed a 50 percent reduction in attrition and injuries, with significant improvements across the board, including in physical fitness, land navigation, and marksmanship skills. The additional training time and a significant reduction in the drill-sergeant-to-trainee ratio were major drivers of these results. Given the program's success, Esper and his leadership team decided to expand basic and advanced training for other branches, such as armor and cavalry.

=== Restructuring the Army ===
To prepare the Army for high-intensity conflict that was expected against China or Russia, Esper undertook several major initiatives designed to enhance the service's combat readiness. In 2018, the Army began rebalancing its force structure by converting two Infantry Brigade Combat Teams to the tank-centric Armored Brigade Combat Teams, increasing the service's heavy and more lethal maneuver forces by over 25%.

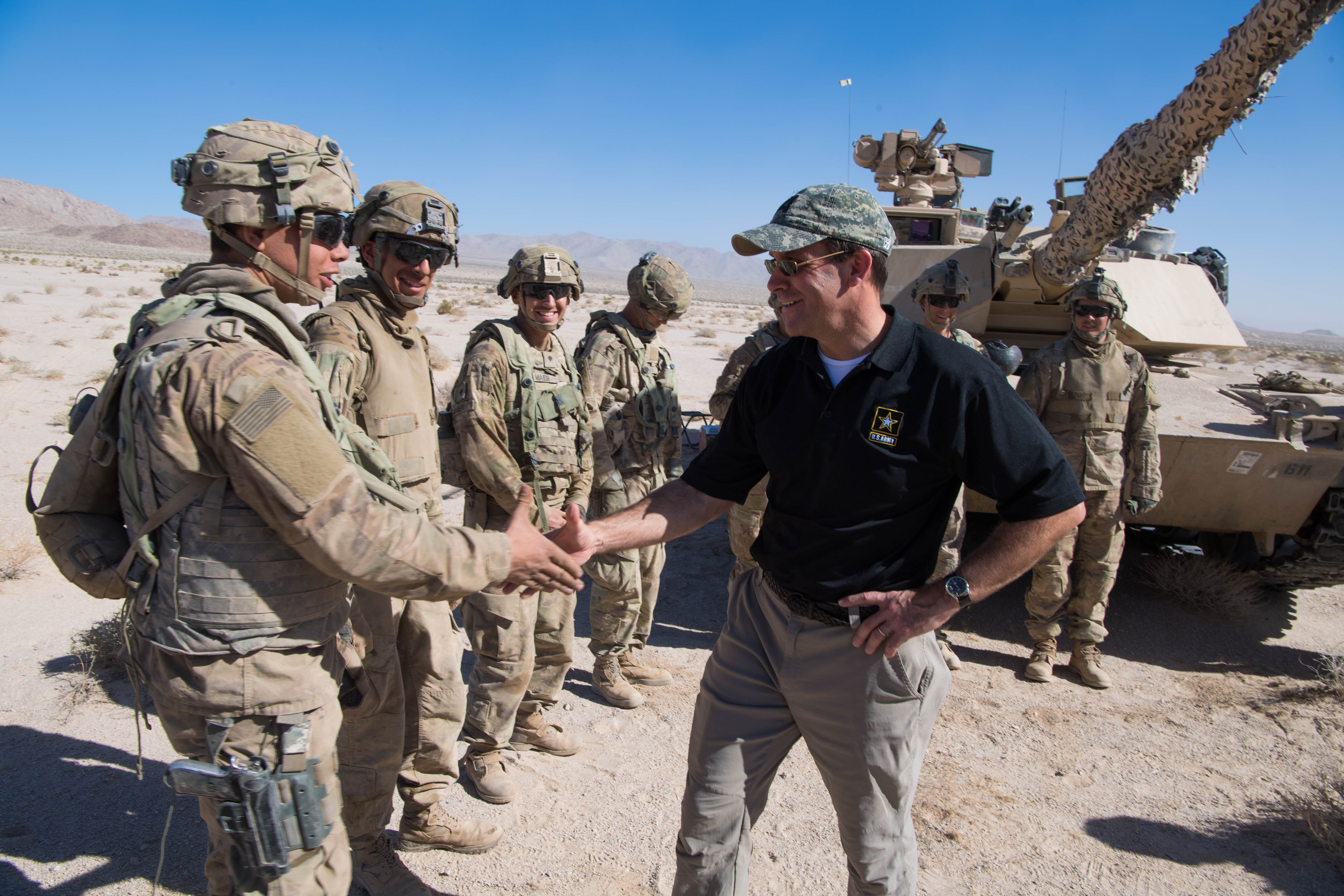
Esper visited the National Training Center in November 2018 to emphasize the renewed importance of armored forces and high-intensity conflict.

The Army also launched new programs to rebuild longer-range precision artillery/rocket systems and mobile air-defense battalions – two specific combat functions that were neglected during the low-intensity wars in Iraq and Afghanistan. These were two of the six modernization priorities outlined by Esper and his leadership team.

A new Multi Domain Task Force (MDTF) was established in 2018 to better integrate and network a variety of combat functions, including air defense, long range fires, cyber, space, and electronic warfare. The first MDTF, designed to counter an increasingly capable China, was deployed to the Indo-Pacific, with additional task forces planned for there and Europe. The MDTFs complemented other ideas being studied by Army leadership to enhance its warfighting capabilities, such as adding additional mechanized infantry companies to its armored formations, along with electronic warfare and cyber capabilities to its brigades.

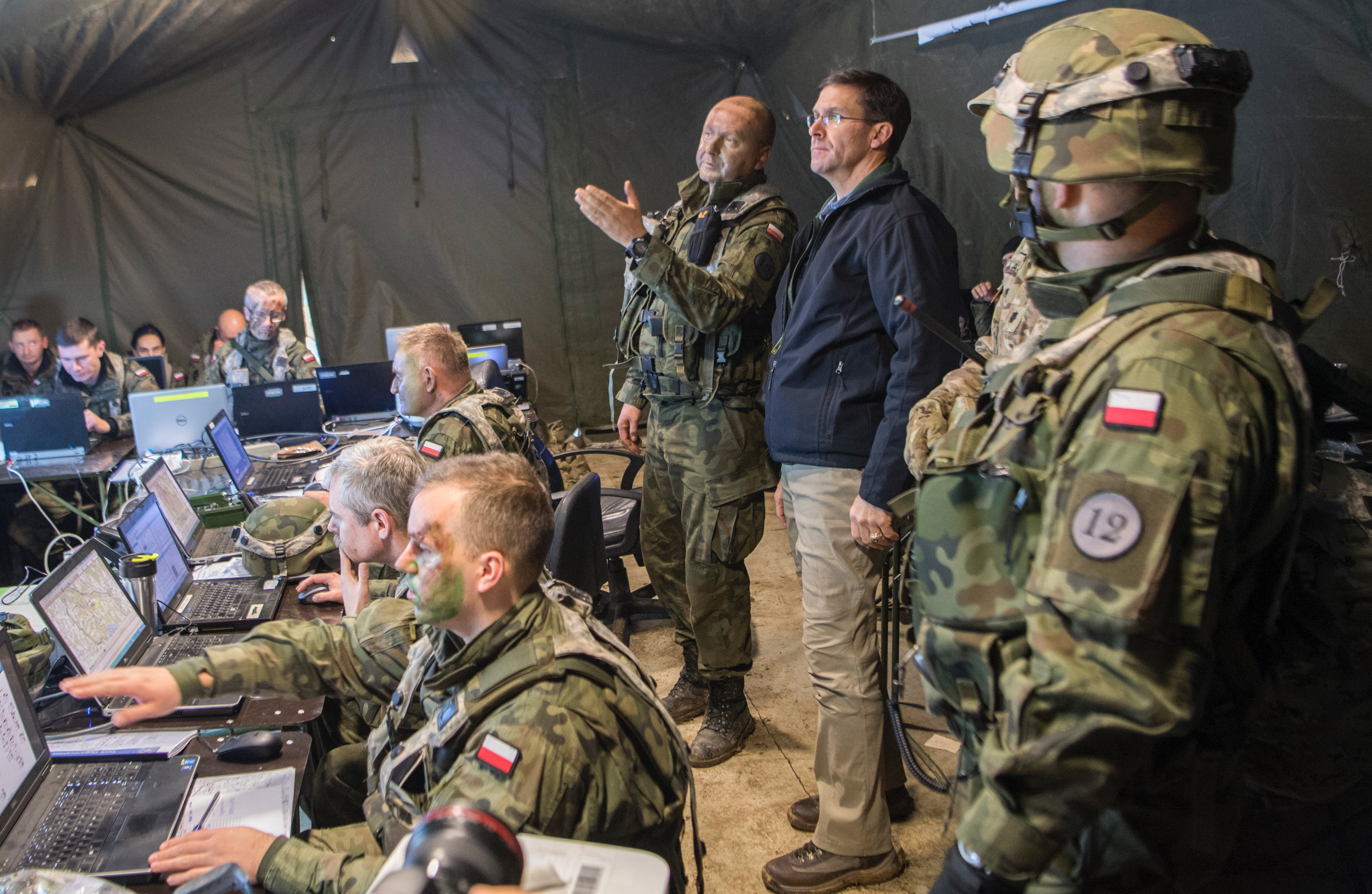
Army Secretary Mark Esper visits with Polish soldiers training with American troops in Germany in 2018. Esper would later reactivate the Army's heavy V Corps in Poland as NATO improved its readiness against Russian revanchism.

In February 2020, the Army announced the reactivation of the V Corps (and its basing at Fort Knox, Kentucky), with a forward headquarters to be established months later in Poland. According to Esper, the purpose behind establishing a fourth corps was to improve command and control in Europe, and help organize the war planning and preparations of the United States' Army and its NATO allies as they squared off against a revanchist Russia on the continent. The activation of V Corps preceded the largest planned deployment of U.S. forces to Europe since the Cold War in the spring of 2020. The movement of tens of thousands of U.S. troops and their equipment to exercise locations across Europe was designed to test the Army's deployability and readiness, while also reassuring NATO allies of the service's ability to respond quickly in a crisis.

=== Night court ===
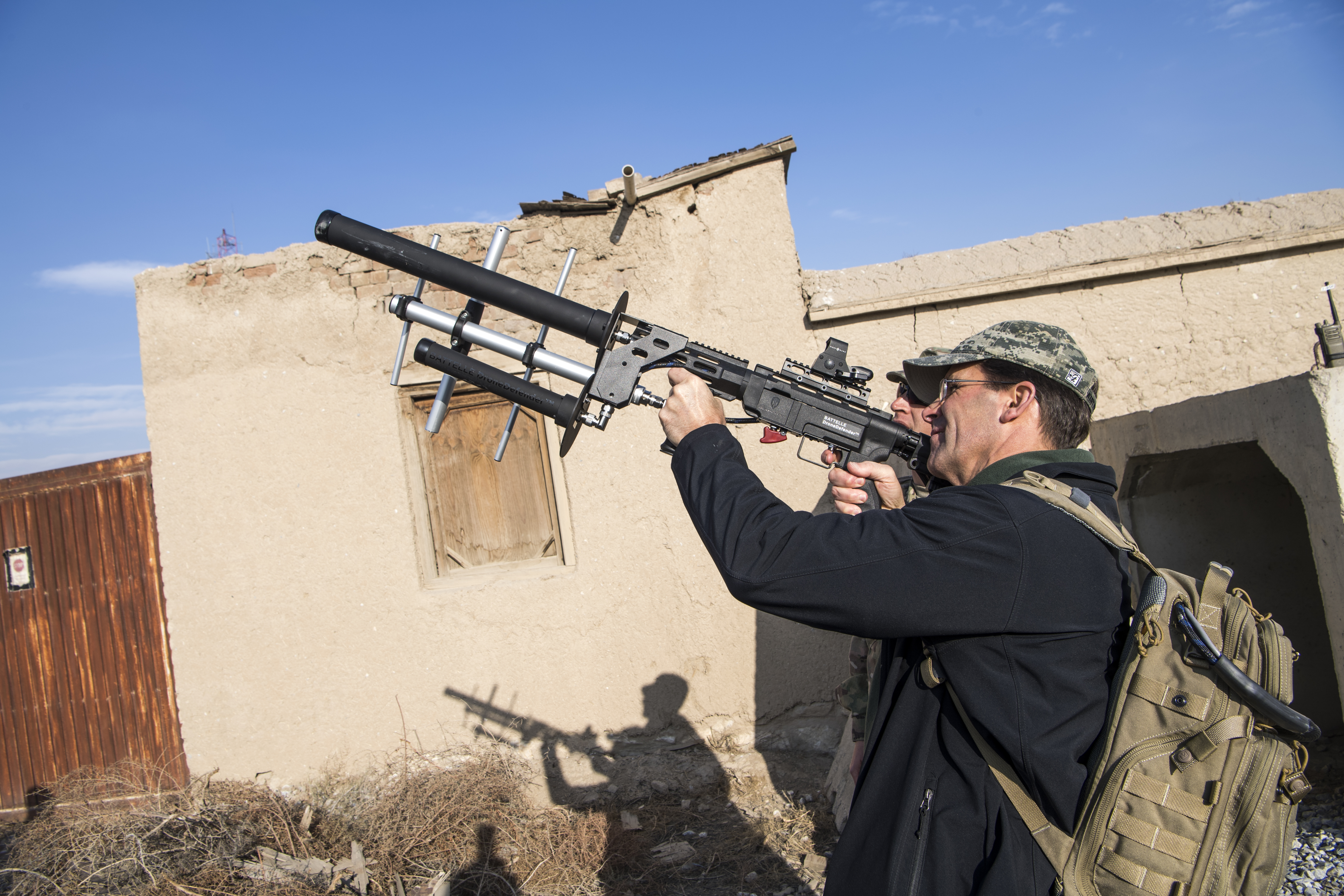
Esper testing an experimental counter-drone weapon in Afghanistan in December 2017

Night Court was the name ascribed to the unconventional process launched by Esper in early 2018 to free up funding for the Army's modernization priorities. The process began when Esper, reportedly frustrated that the Army Staff was unable to identify the budget needed to fund his modernization initiatives, directed the staff to rank every single one of the service's five-hundred-plus acquisition programs in order of importance (as they saw them), and then justify why each one should receive funding before the Army's new thirty-five programs.

Moreover, the staff was told to find savings from all the service's accounts, not just the acquisition portfolio. Esper, Chief of Staff Mark Milley, and other Army leaders then personally reviewed every existing program over a period of several weeks. The effort resulted in the leadership team finding over $31 billion in savings. They eliminated or reduced 186 programs to fund the service's modernization strategy, as well as other initiatives such as expanded basic training, a new recruiting campaign, and an overhaul of the Army's physical fitness program. Every one of the Army's top thirty-plus programs bundled under the Army's new six modernization priorities received the money it needed in the FY 2019 budget as a result.

The Army continued its Night Court proceedings through the fall of 2018 and into 2019. By the spring of that year, only a few months before Esper became Secretary of Defense, the service canceled another forty-one programs, and delayed or reduced thirty-nine more, to find an additional $13.5 billion in savings for its modernization efforts in the FY 2020 budget. Esper eventually applied the Night Court process to the entire Department of Defense when he became the Defense Secretary in July 2019.

=== Army modernization and Army Futures Command ===
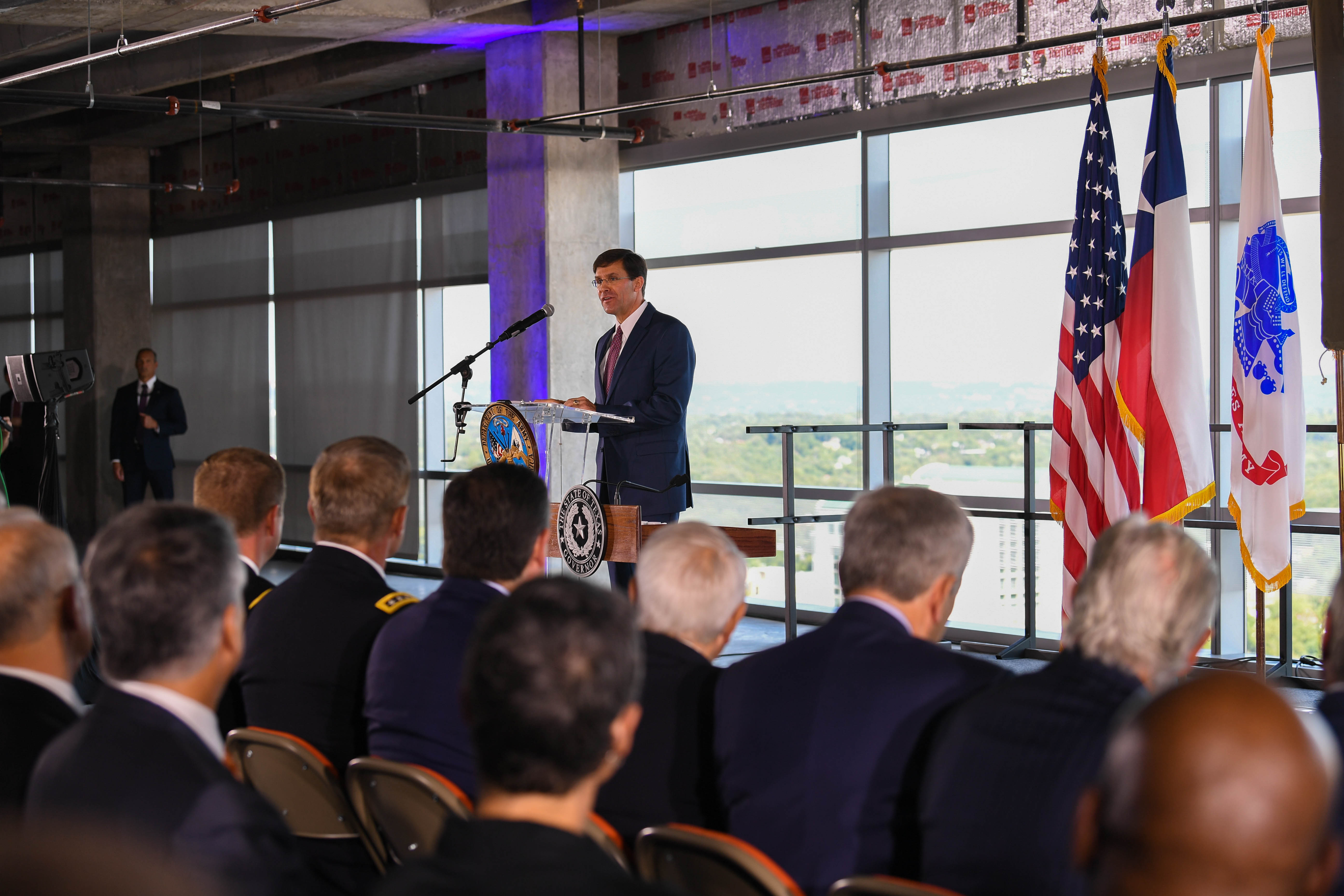
Esper visits Austin, Texas, for the activation of Army Futures Command (AFC), which he established earlier. He is joined by Army senior leaders and state representatives. Esper later participated in a press conference and spoke at the Association of the United States Army reception in honor of the activation of AFC. (U.S. Army photo by Staff Sgt. Brandy N. Mejia)

In 2018, Esper directed the establishment of Army Futures Command (AFC) in Austin, Texas. It was the biggest change in the Army's structure in over four decades. AFC's purpose was to "establish unity of command and unity of effort by consolidating the Army's entire modernization process under one roof." One commander would be driving concept development, requirements determination, organizational design, science and technology research, and solution development. Eight cross-functional teams, each led by a brigadier general, were also established to rapidly and efficiently coordinate all the acquisition players in order to ensure cost, time, and schedule milestones were met. The goal was to avoid the acquisition failures of the past in order to field the weapons needed in the future.

To guide AFC's work, the Army leadership established six modernization priorities, which included long-range precision fires, next-generation combat vehicles, future vertical lift, Army network, air and missile defense, and soldier lethality. Included under these broad categories were thirty-one top tier programs that would deliver the future force. An additional four programs were added by the service's Rapid Capabilities and Critical Technologies Office, which Esper established in late 2018 to "find and harvest emerging critical technologies" in the private sector for the AFC's use.

In February 2022, the Army announced that 24 of the service's 35 modernization programs will be in soldiers' hands as fielded systems or prototypes in fiscal year 2023.

=== Soldier health and fitness ===
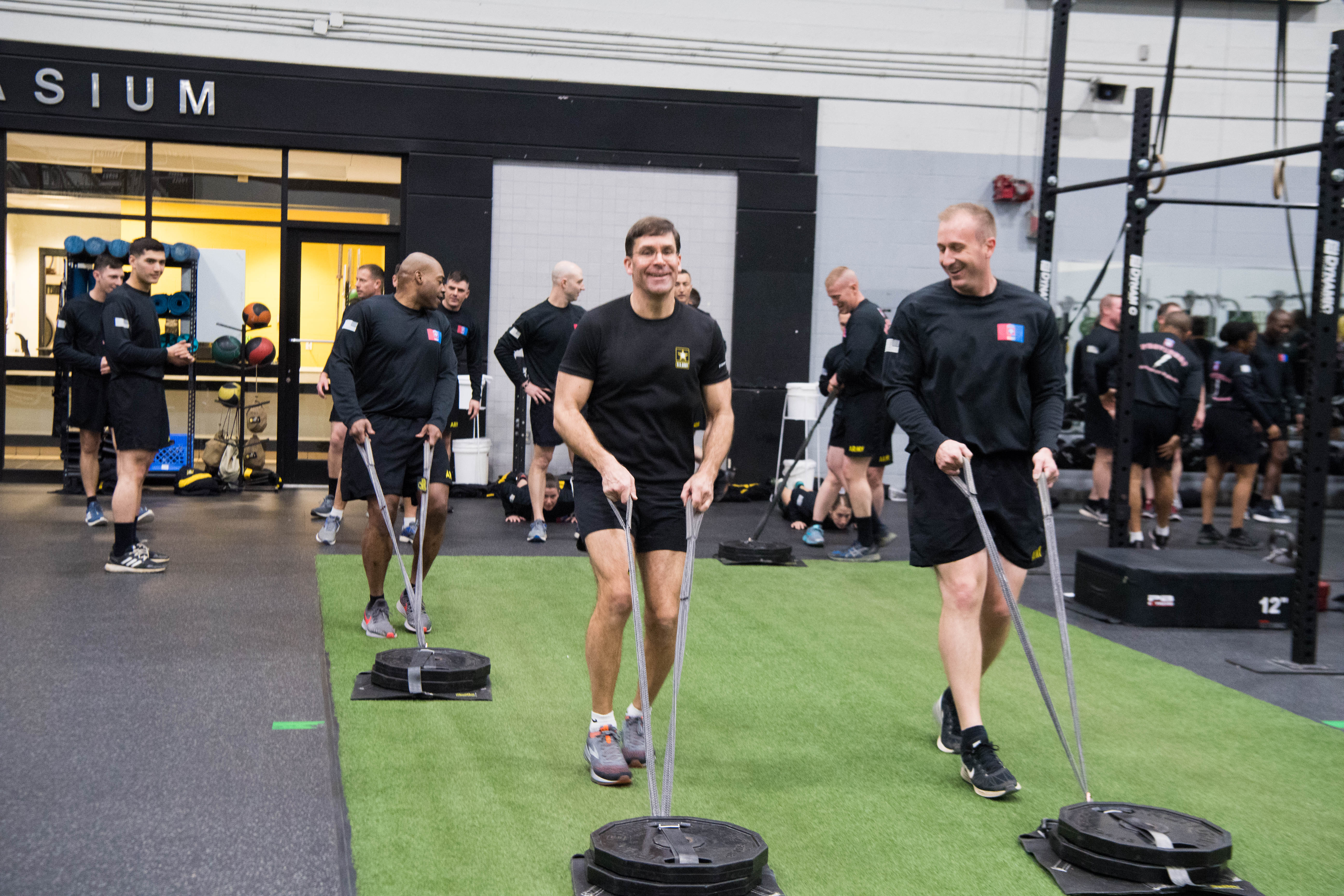
U.S. Army photo of Secretary Mark Esper conducting training on the Army Combat Fitness Test in March 2019 with paratroopers of the 82d Airborne Division at Fort Bragg, N.C.

In 2018, Esper directed a multi-year phased adoption of the new Army Combat Fitness Test (ACFT). The six-event ACFT replaced the three-event Army Physical Fitness Test that had been in use since 1980. The ACFT was based on the Army's wartime experiences in Iraq and Afghanistan, more than a hundred critical "warrior tasks and drills," and modern fitness regimens. It was also based on extensive data on how, where, and why soldiers suffered physical injuries that made them non-available for combat duty. Further, the ACFT mimicked the skills, movements, and other physical tasks associated with wartime tasks.

A year later, Esper approved plans to assign sports trainers, physical therapists, nutritionists, and other specialists to the Army's brigades and battalions as a second pillar of improving the service's fitness culture. The "Holistic Health and Fitness" (H2F) program as it became known aimed to "optimize soldier readiness, reduce injury rates, improve rehabilitation after injury, and increase the overall effectiveness of the Army." The adoption of the new ACFT and its training regimen, the initial establishment of the H2F program, and other initiatives resulted in a reduction in soldier non-deployability rates from over 15% in 2017 down to under 6% by the end of 2019, leading to an increase in units' readiness across the Army.

=== Talent management ===
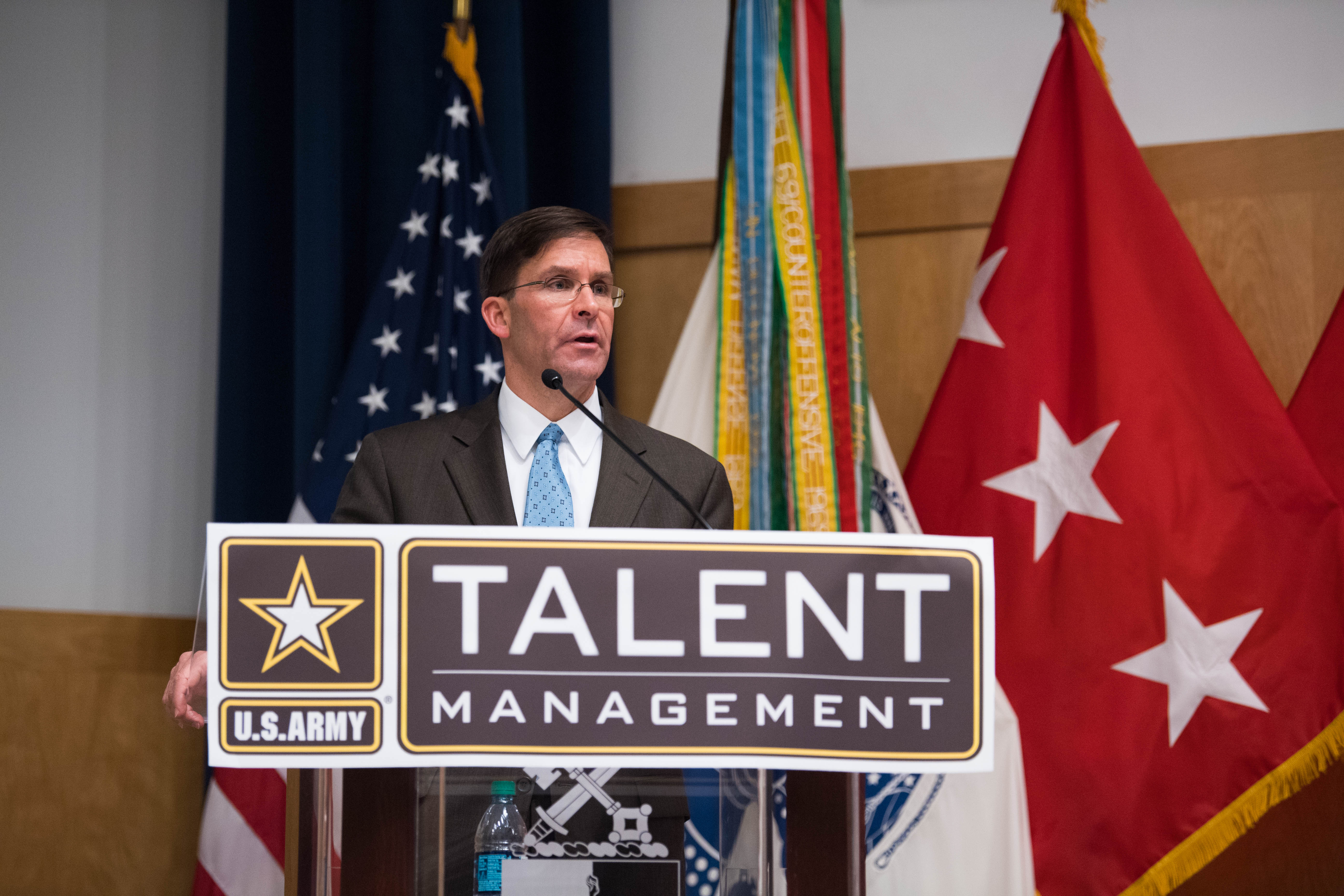
Army Secretary Mark Esper spoke before the Army's leadership in January 2019 about his Talent Management initiative.

In 2019, Esper shifted focus to another pillar of the "Army renaissance" that needed reform – the Army personnel system. A core objective was to move away from a command-driven people management model branded as "up or out" to a new market-based talent management approach that offered more room for personal preferences and emphasized "perform or out." A Talent Management Task Force led by General Jim McConville, the Vice Chief of Staff of the Army, and Esper, went about setting up the market-based model for commanders and soldiers (beginning with the officer corps)—the buyers and sellers, respectively—that would give them more say in their careers, their timelines, and the assignments they took.

Within the constraints of a military system where the needs of the Army still came first, the task force worked to give service members more say in their careers, while also improving efficiency and attaining higher rates of satisfaction. Examples of the new system that emerged included the Army Talent Alignment Process, which allowed soldiers to remain at one duty station longer than three years if they wanted, and permit them to search and apply for jobs across the Army. Commanders, conversely, would be able to search for and interview applicants, thus affording them the opportunity to make better choices about who served in their units. They could attract top talent by advertising things such as their command philosophy, training regimen, and the expectations they had of their subordinates, for example.

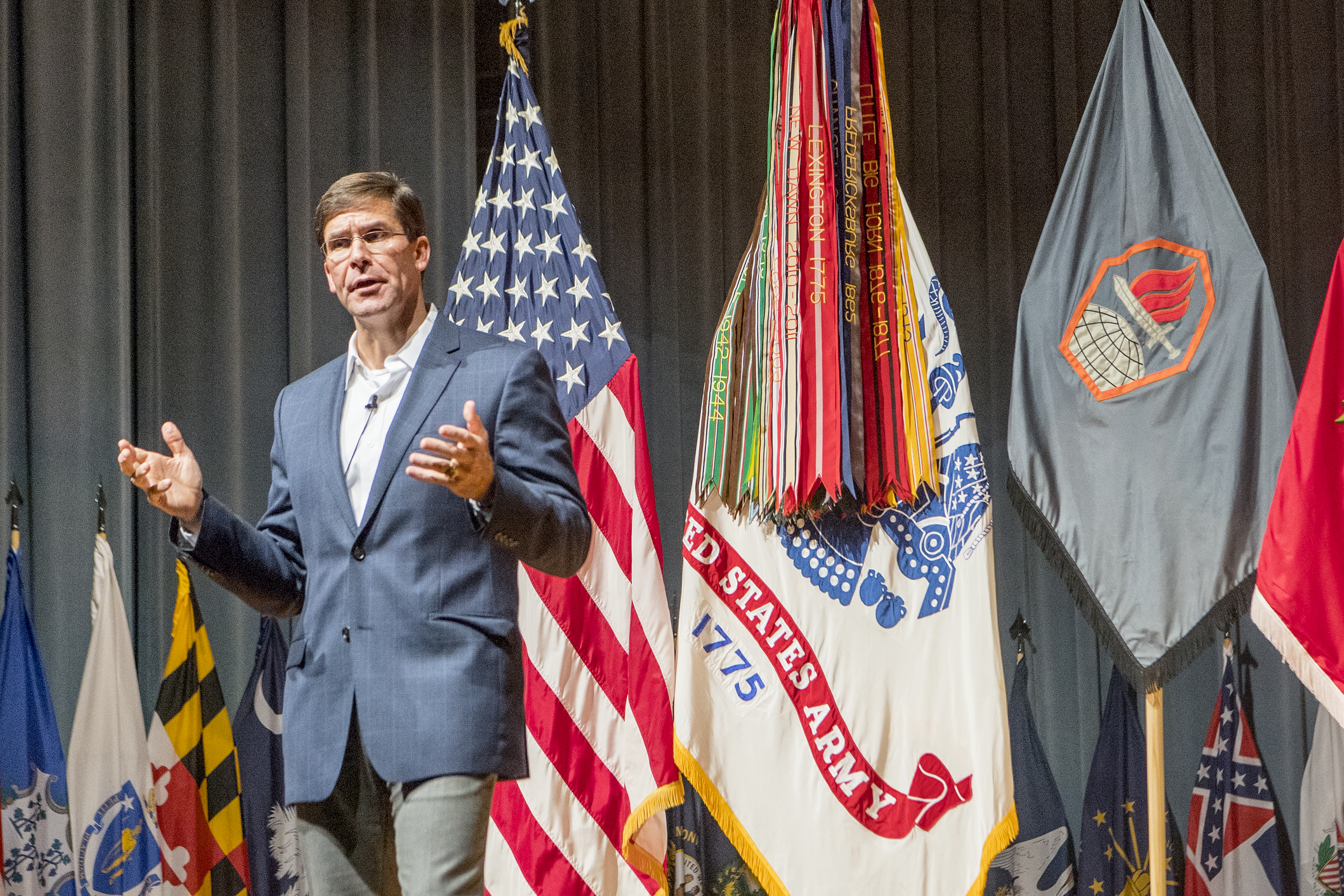
Secretary Esper visits the U.S. Army Cyber Center of Excellence, at Fort Gordon, Georgia, in June 2018 in a push to advance the service's cyber capabilities and talent. (U.S. Army photo by Daniel Torok)

In the summer of 2019, the Army also piloted a new multiday approach to choosing battalion commanders – arguably the most important command selection in an officer's career – based on the NFL's Combine. Under this new system, selected officers underwent "a series of cognitive, non-cognitive, and physical assessments," such as fitness tests, assessments of verbal and written communications skills, and a double-blind interview with a panel of senior officers, over a period of several days. The results of this weeklong period were eventually provided to promotion boards. Other initiatives being developed included giving service members the opportunity to take yearlong unpaid sabbaticals without being penalized, and making it possible for soldiers to make seamless transitions between the regular Army, the National Guard, and the Army Reserve as their professional goals or personal situations changed over time.

=== Family care ===
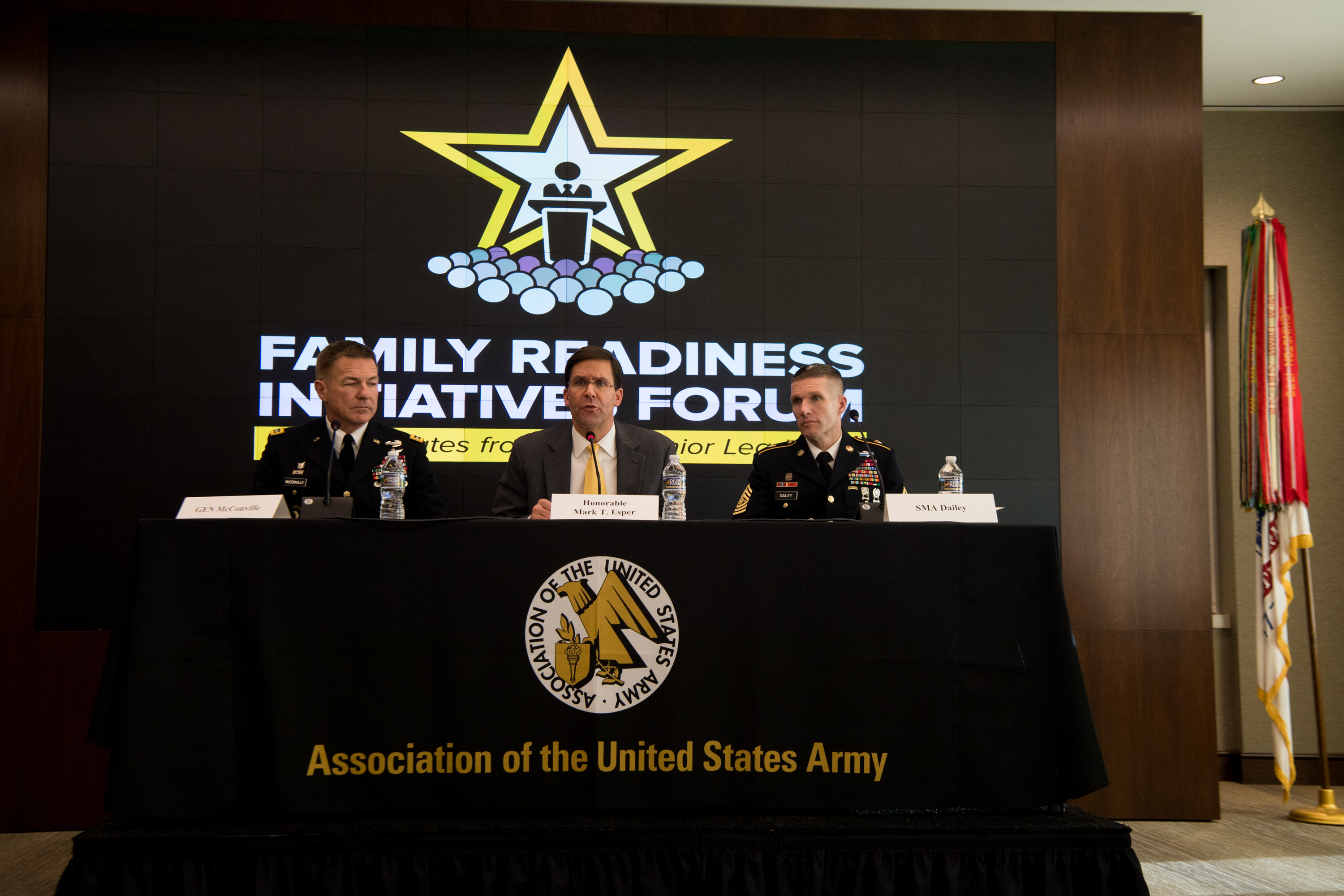
Secretary Esper spoke at the AUSA Army Family Readiness Forum alongside Army Vice Chief of Staff James McConville and Sgt. Maj. of the Army Daniel A. Dailey.

Esper identified "taking care of Soldiers and their families" as a top priority during his nomination hearing. At the top of this list was spousal hiring and childcare, two priorities borne out of his wife's experiences when he served on active duty. Esper pushed on several fronts to advance this initiative: making professional license reciprocity a condition for where the Army would initiate or expand base investment decisions; working with state and federal lawmakers to mandate license reciprocity and incentivize the hiring of military spouses; reducing the number of PCS moves military families would make in order to give spouses job stability and their children school stability; reducing the on-base hiring timeline and requirements for civilian applicants; and expanding capacity at childcare centers while prioritizing the children of uniformed personnel over civilians. As Secretary of Defense, Esper went further by pushing to standardize and tailor childcare center operating hours for service members who worked weekend and unusual hours.

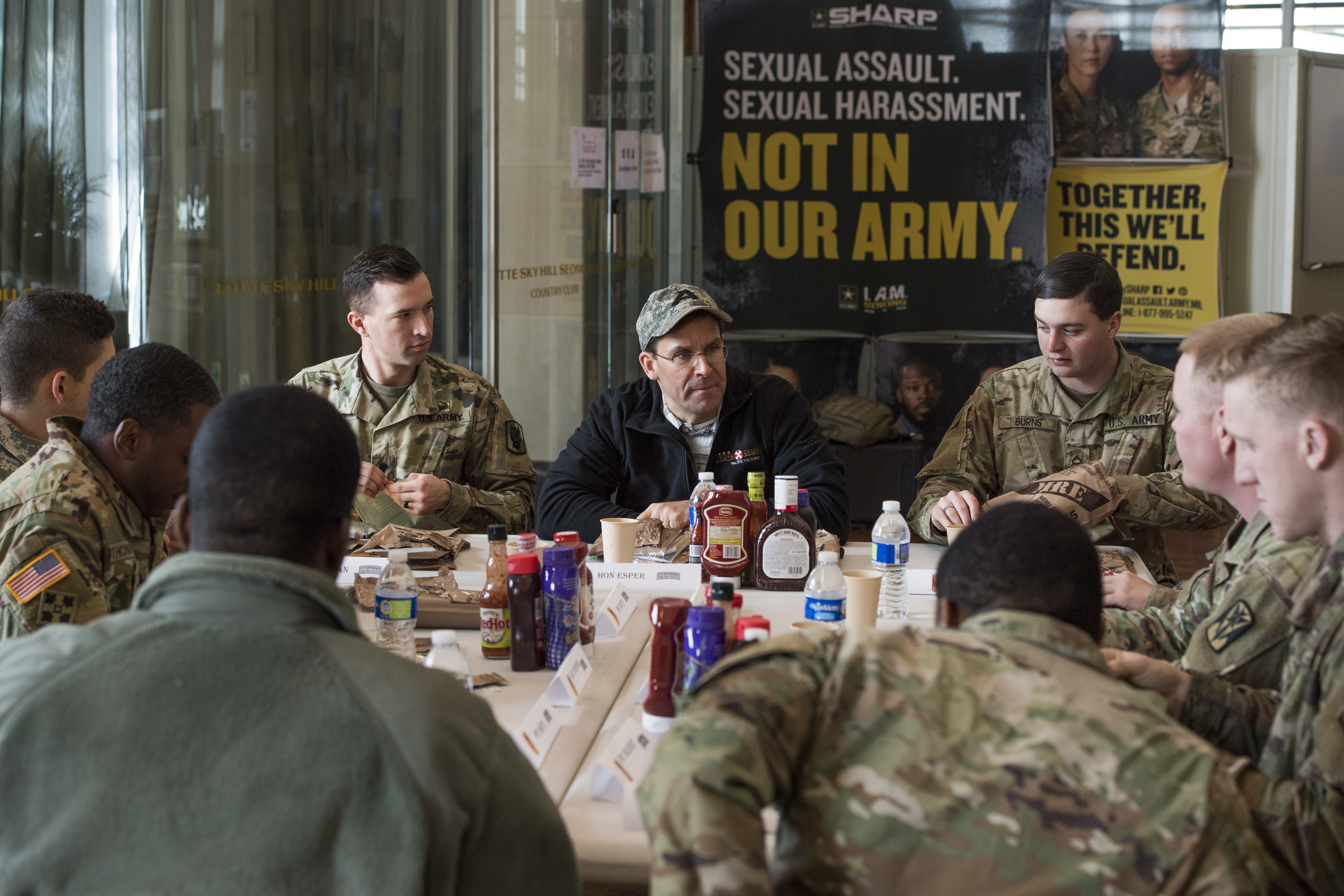
Army Secretary Mark Esper meeting with enlisted soldiers to discuss issues of concern to them and their families

Another family issue that Esper worked to improve was the Exceptional Family Member Program, a program for assisting and prioritizing service members with a child in need of specialty care or medical attention. His focus was on improving access, especially for overseas or remote assignments, and then standardizing that process across the Department of Defense. Another area of emphasis was ensuring quality on-base housing for service members. Esper conducted multiple inspections of military homes across the service to determine the cause and extent of the problem, pressed housing contractors to meet their obligations to maintain quality homes and complete work orders more quickly and properly, wrote the department's housing "bill of rights" for service members, and collaborated with lawmakers on legislative changes to improve quality of life for those in uniform.

=== Transgender servicemembers ===
President Trump tweeted his objections to transgender servicemembers in July 2017, and, under his Presidential Memorandum of August 25, 2017, he required the Department of Defense to produce a report on this subject. Esper was asked by reporters in February 2018 whether soldiers had concerns about serving beside openly transgender individuals. He replied: "It really hasn't come up."

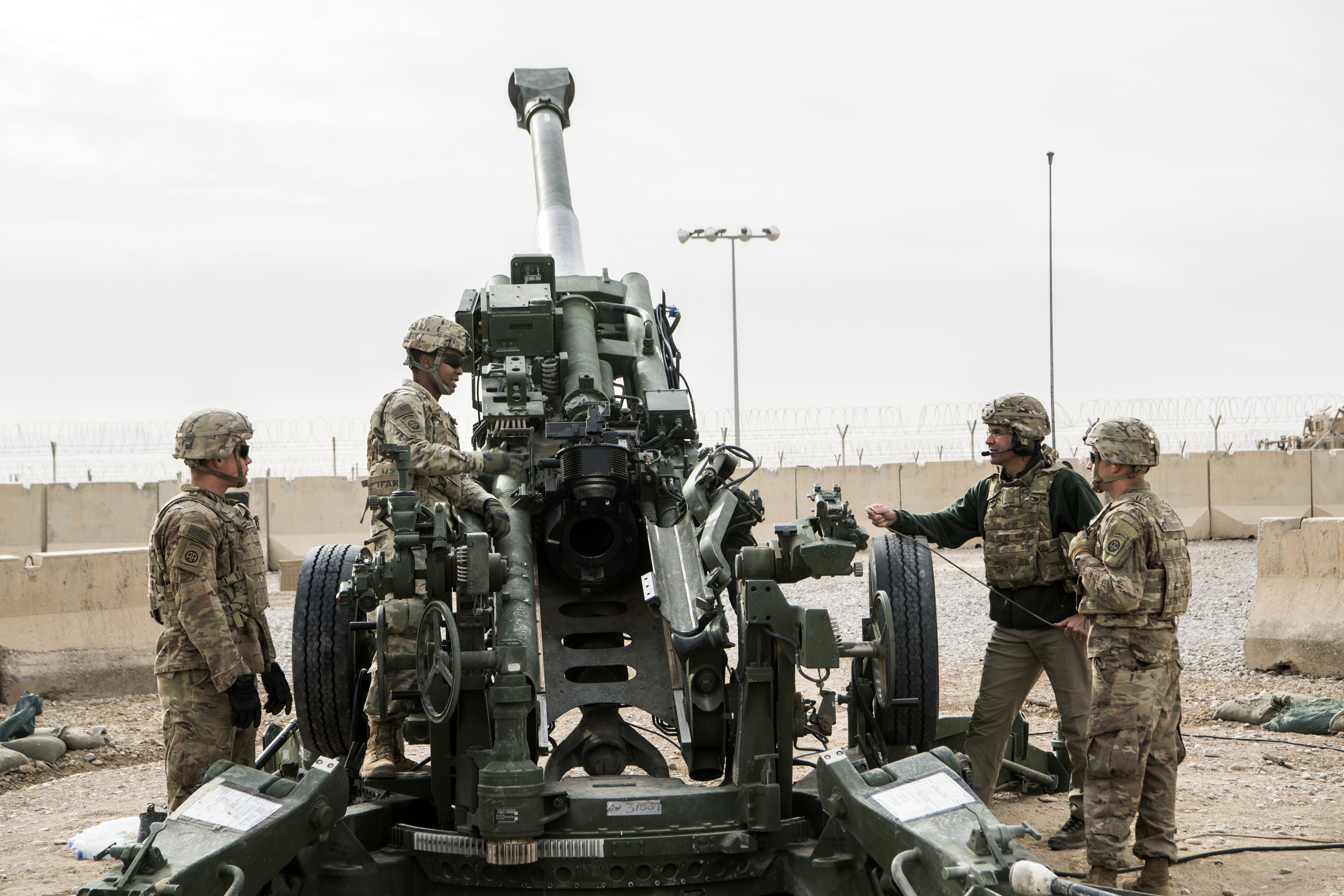
Secretary Esper visited with an M777 howitzer gun crew in Afghanistan in December 2017 as the service prioritized the rebuilding of its long-range fires capabilities.

After Esper was nominated to become Secretary of Defense, he said that he had met several transgender service members and was impressed with them. Nonetheless, he supported Directive-type Memorandum-19-004, which required service members to meet standards associated with their actual sex. Esper claimed it was not a "blanket ban" on transgender service members but rather a policy to ensure that service members are deployable worldwide and can meet military standards without "special accommodations." He said that service members would be individually assessed and that some would be offered waivers to continue serving. In this interview, Esper cited the Defense Department's February 2018 report to support his views.

== Secretary of Defense ==
=== Temporary appointment and nomination ===
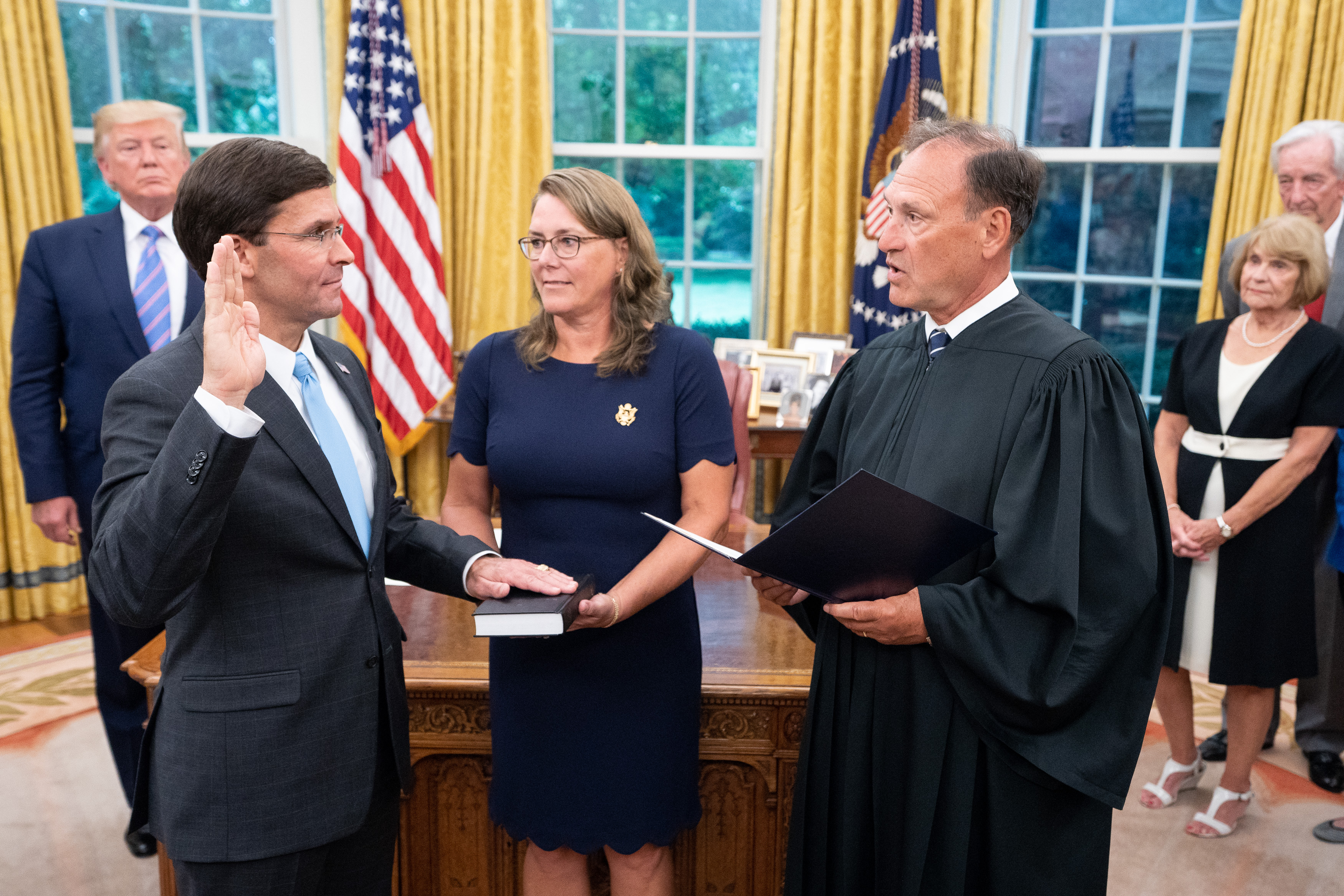
Esper, with his wife Leah, is sworn in as Secretary of Defense by Justice Samuel Alito on July 23, 2019.

Trump announced the appointment of Esper as Acting Secretary of Defense on June 18, 2019, after Acting Secretary Patrick Shanahan decided to withdraw his nomination. Four days later, it was announced that Trump would nominate Esper to serve as Secretary of Defense in a permanent capacity. On July 15, 2019, the White House formally sent his nomination to the Senate. The Senate Committee on Armed Services scheduled a hearing on the nomination for the next day.

=== Senate confirmation ===
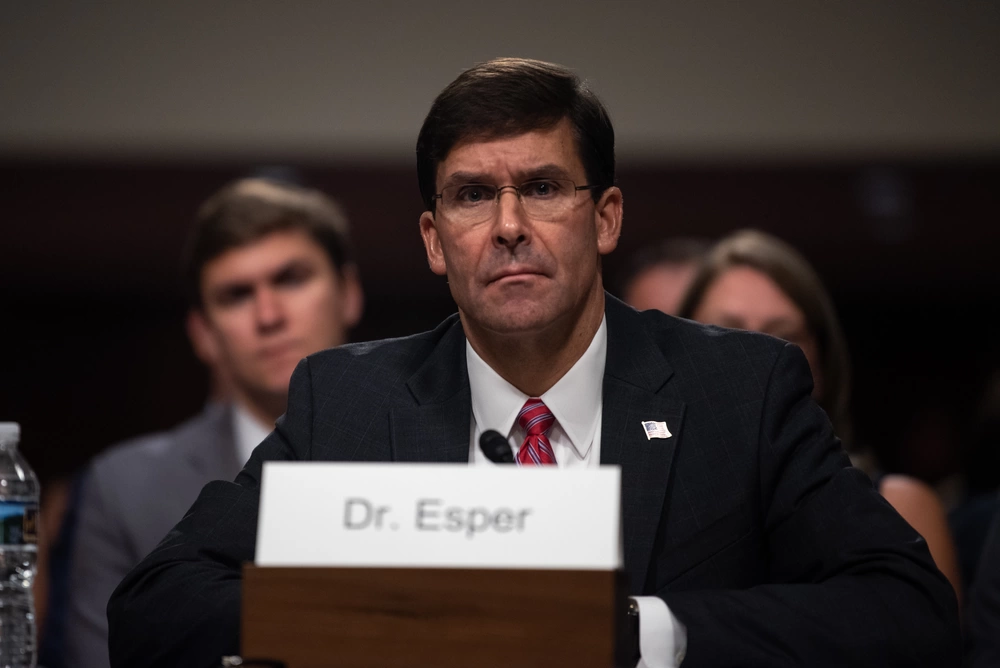
Mark T. Esper testifies before the Senate Armed Services committee on July 16, 2019, for his nomination to become Secretary of Defense. Days later the Senate confirmed him by a 90–8 vote.

Esper appeared before the Senate Armed Services Committee on July 16, 2019. During his testimony, Esper stated that implementing the National Defense Strategy, with an emphasis on China then Russia, would be his focus, adding that he believed in President Ronald Reagan's mantra of "peace through strength." Esper said that he would have four priorities as defense secretary: "build a more lethal force by increasing readiness and modernizing for the future to deter war"; "strengthen our alliances and attract new partners"; "reform the Department,"; and "focus on the well-being of our Soldiers, Sailors, Airmen, Marines, and their families."

With regard to the conduct of foreign policy, Esper said "the greatest power we have is the power of our values" and that people around the world aspire "to come to this country because they know we believe in freedom and democracy and individual rights."

Esper also stated that a "very important" matter for him was to "continue the long-held tradition that DoD remain apolitical," and that he would resign if pressed by the president to do something illegal, immoral, or unethical.

During the Senate confirmation process, Esper was asked to identify the factors he would consider in making recommendations to the President with regard to the use of military force. In a written response to the Senate Armed Services Committee, Esper wrote that he would "consider a variety of factors, but principally the threat to the United States, including its imminence; the nature of the U.S. interest at issue and its importance; whether nonmilitary means have been considered and are being integrated into any proposed response; whether we would have a clear and achievable objective for using force; the likely risks, costs, and consequences of the operation; whether the proposed action is appropriate and proportional; the views of the Congress; the willingness of foreign partners to support the action; and the legal basis in domestic and international law."

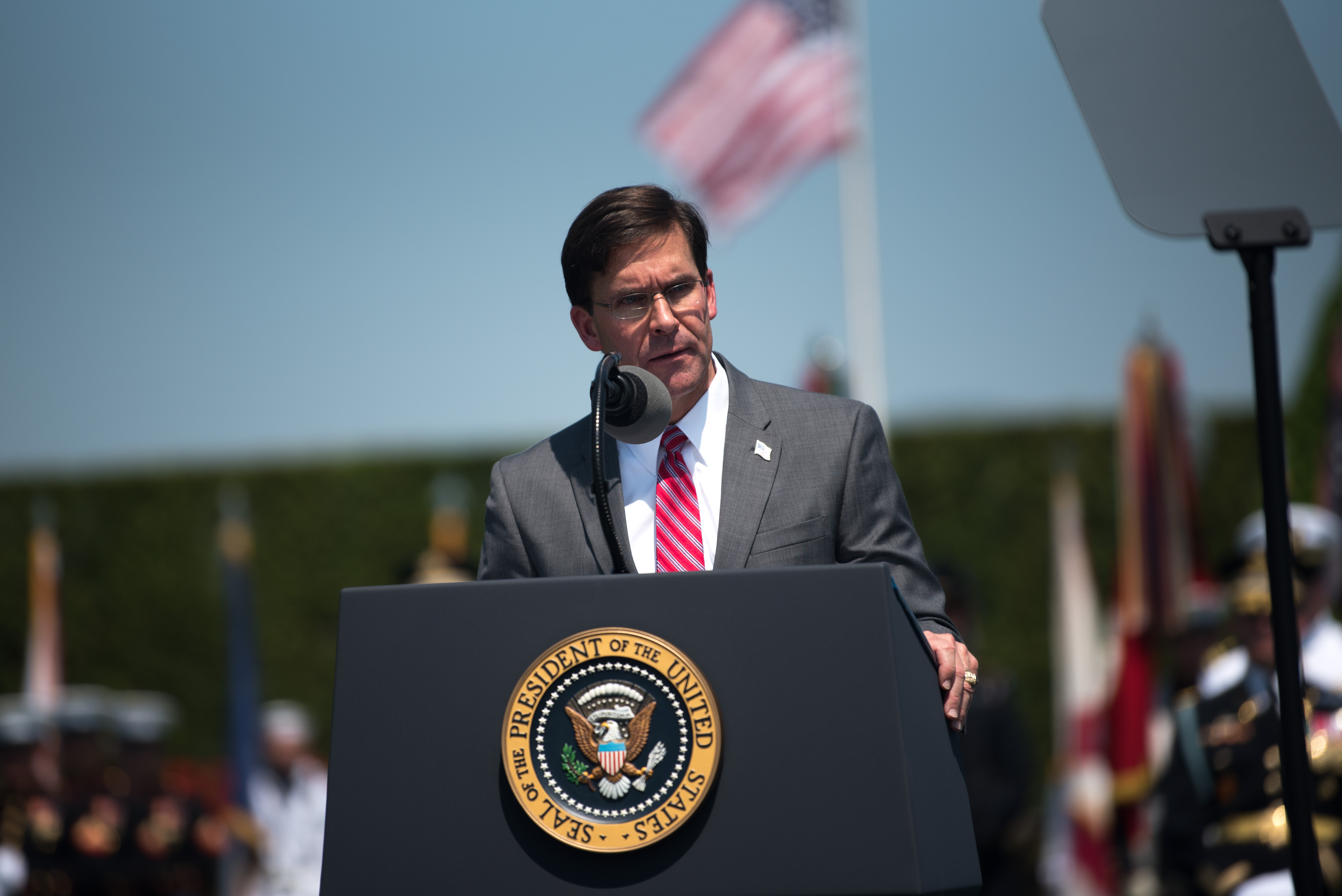
Newly confirmed secretary of defense Mark Esper speaks before the assembled VIPs, troops and spectators at the Pentagon for his Full Honors Welcome Ceremony on July 25, 2019.

In his first formal message to all Department of Defense employees on June 24, 2019, a few weeks prior, Esper said he placed "great importance on a commitment by all, especially Leaders, to those values and behaviors that represent the best of the military profession and mark the character and integrity of the Armed Forces that the American people admire."

On July 22, 2019, the Senate voted 85–6 to invoke cloture on Esper's nomination. On July 23, 2019, his nomination was confirmed by a vote of 90–8. Esper's confirmation made him the first graduate of the U.S. Military Academy at West Point, and the first secretary of the Army, to become secretary of defense. Esper is also the first former member of the National Guard to become Secretary of Defense.

=== National Defense Strategy ===
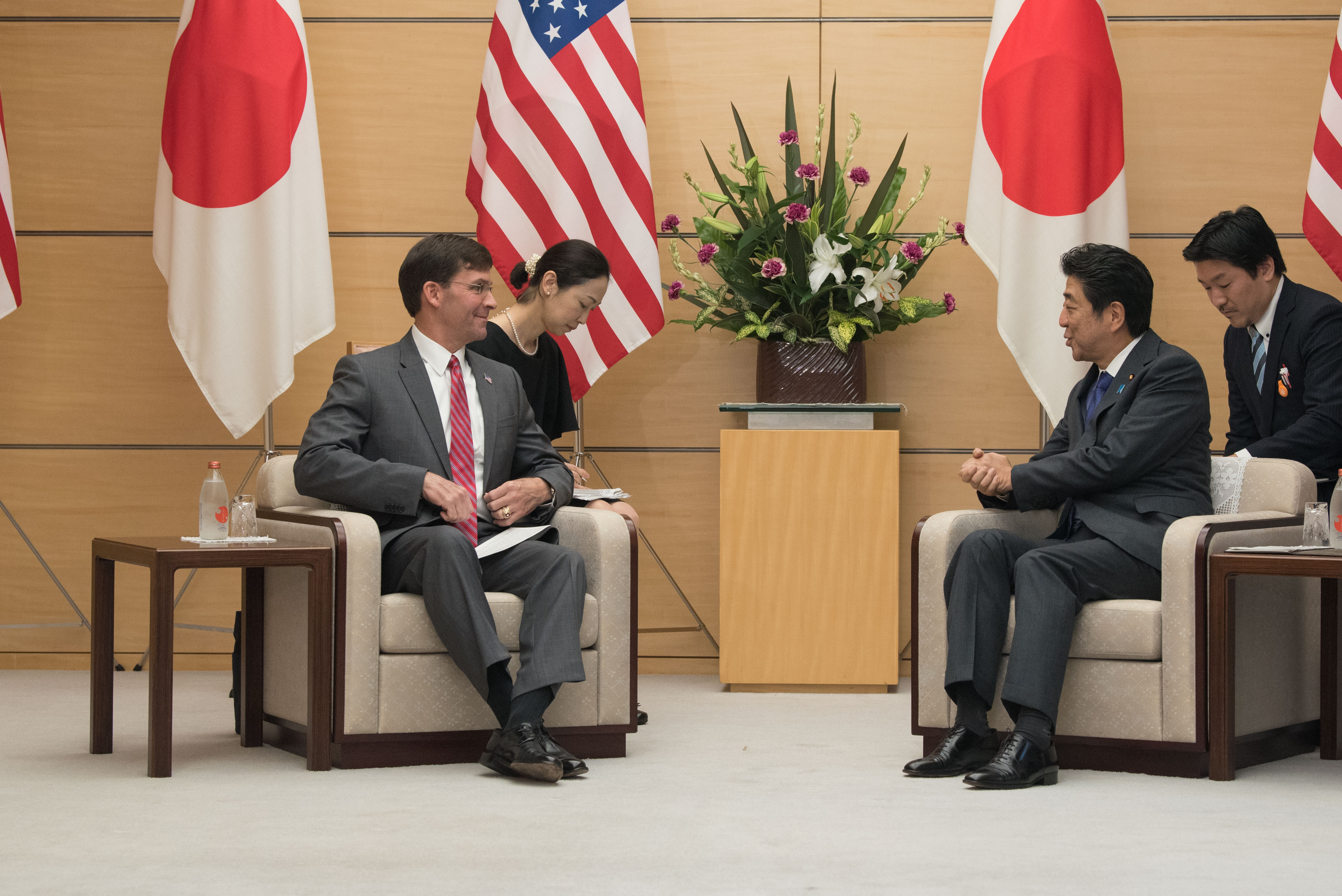
Secretary Esper meets with Japanese prime minister Shinzo Abe in Tokyo on August 7, 2019, during his first trip abroad as Defense Secretary, underscoring the IndoPacific theater as the primary focus of the National Defense Strategy.

In his June 24 message to all Department of Defense employees, Esper stated that implementing the National Defense Strategy (NDS) would be his primary focus.

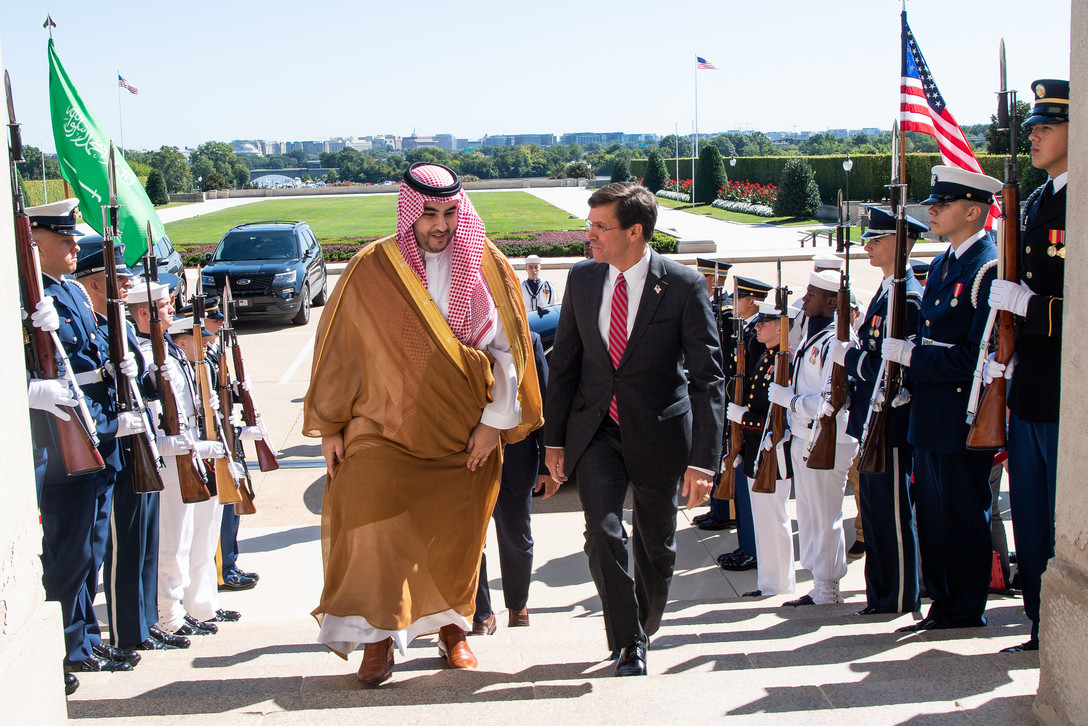
Esper hosts Saudi prince Khalid bin Salman at the Pentagon, August 29, 2019

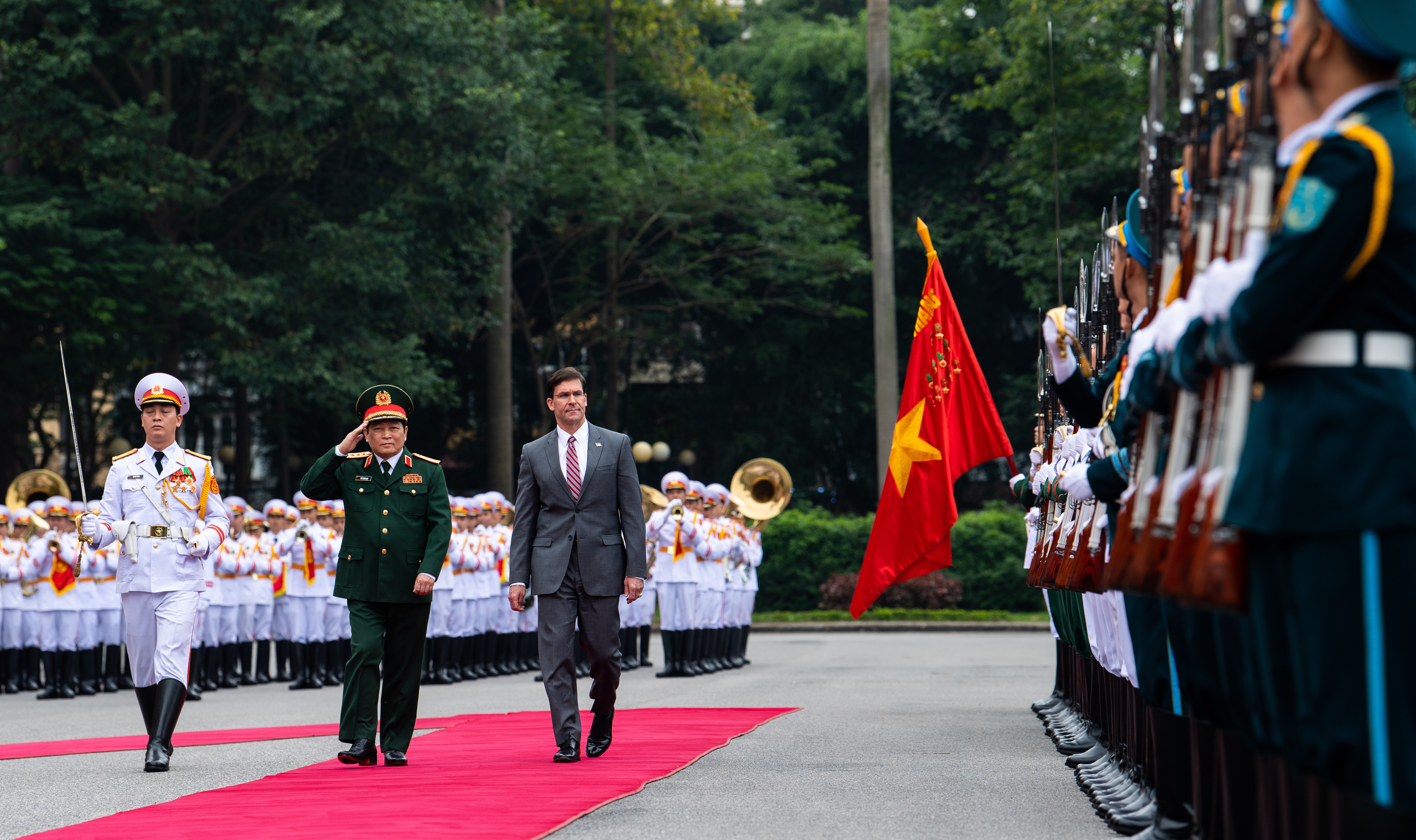
Esper inspects troops alongside Vietnamese defense minister Ngô Xuân Lịch in Hanoi, November 20, 2019

The NDS said the Defense Department's mission was "to provide combat-credible military forces needed to deter war and protect the security of our nation," and if deterrence failed, the U.S. military had to fight and win on the modern battlefield. It further stated that the U.S. had now entered a new era of Great Power Competition where China and Russia are America's strategic competitors, and "rapid technological change" was a defining hallmark. The NDS asserted that "The costs of not implementing this strategy are clear. Failure to meet our defense objectives will result in decreasing U.S. global influence, eroding cohesion among allies and partners, and reduced access to markets that will contribute to a decline in our prosperity and standard of living."

Esper identified ten objectives critical to implementing the NDS: Review, update, and approve all China and Russia plans; Implement the Immediate Response Force, Contingency Response Force, and Dynamic Force Employment enhanced readiness concepts; Reallocate, reassign, and redeploy forces in accordance with the NDS; Achieve a higher level of sustainable readiness; Develop a coordinated plan to strengthen allies and build partners; Reform and manage the Fourth Estate and DoD; Focus the Department on China; Modernize the force—invest in game-changing technologies; Establish realistic joint war games, exercises, and training plans; and, Develop a modern joint warfighting concept and, ultimately, doctrine.

One year later, in July 2020, Esper delivered a televised address to Department of Defense employees to give them a "one year update" on the progress achieved in implementing the NDS, with a focus on his top ten objectives and other actions necessary to accomplish the department's goals.

=== Reforming the Pentagon ===
Esper made several changes in his first month in office to jump start his reform efforts, from altering the number, membership, scope, and purpose of meetings he held in the Pentagon to initiating a "Night Court" style review process focused across the department, beginning with the so-called fourth estate. His stated aim was to "improve our business practices, become more efficient, and free up funding" for other priorities.

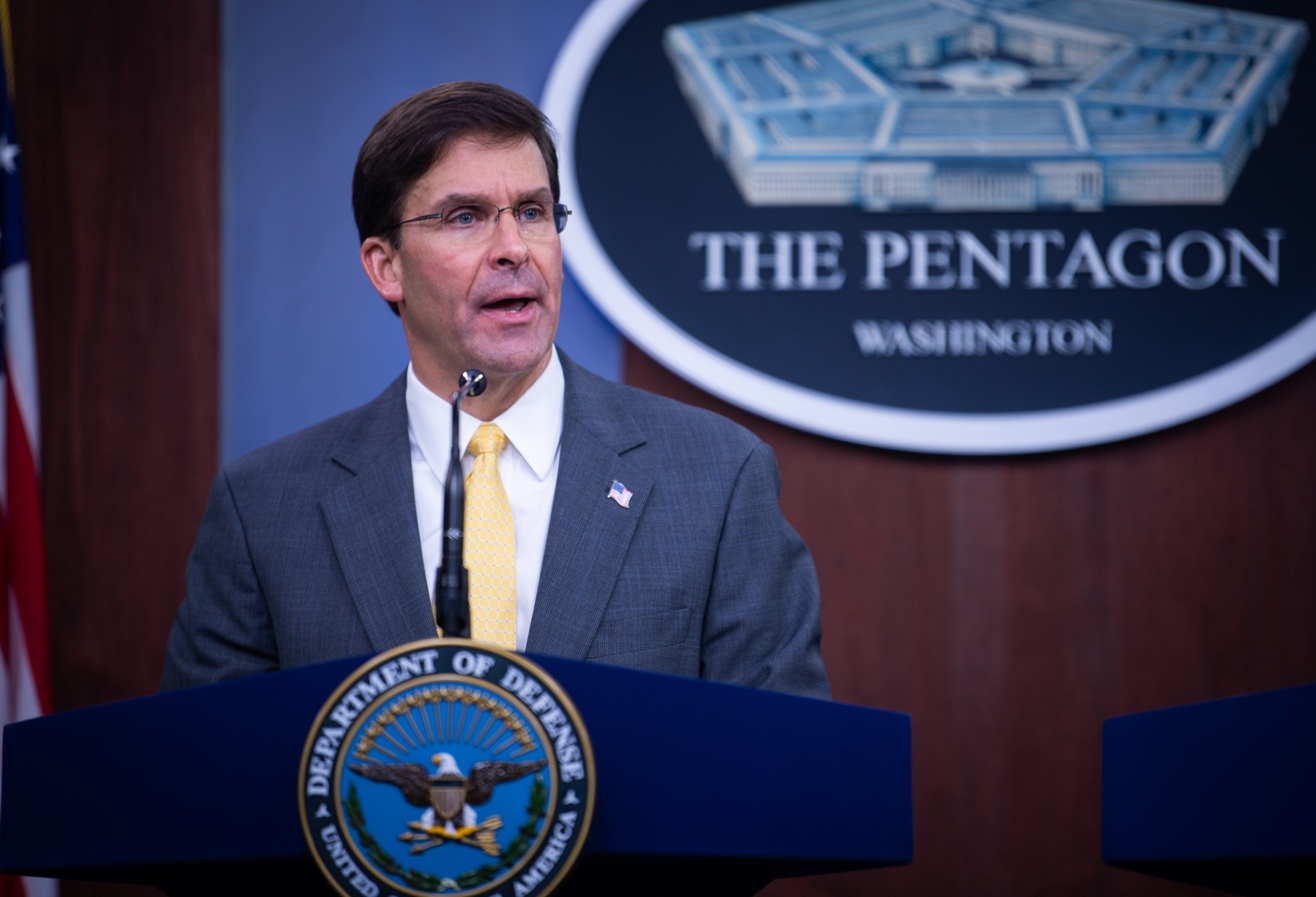
Secretary of Defense Mark Esper speaks to members of the press during his first joint press conference at the Pentagon on August 28, 2019. Esper held formal press conferences monthly during his tenure.

On the cost-savings front, Esper's efforts reportedly led to over $5 billion in saving his first six months in office. To sustain the review process and assert greater control over the various agencies and commands not under the armed services and their civilian leaders, Esper put the Senate-confirmed Chief Management Officer in charge of these organizations, and then required them to participate in the annual budget build and Program Objective Memorandum process similar to the armed services.

Esper would eventually pursue a number of other reform initiatives, with issues ranging from improving childcare capacity and availability for DoD personnel and targeting over-classification within the Pentagon, to reducing the total number of general officers and replacing Defense Department organizations such as the Defense Security Cooperation Agency with qualified civilian leaders.

=== Civilian control of the military ===
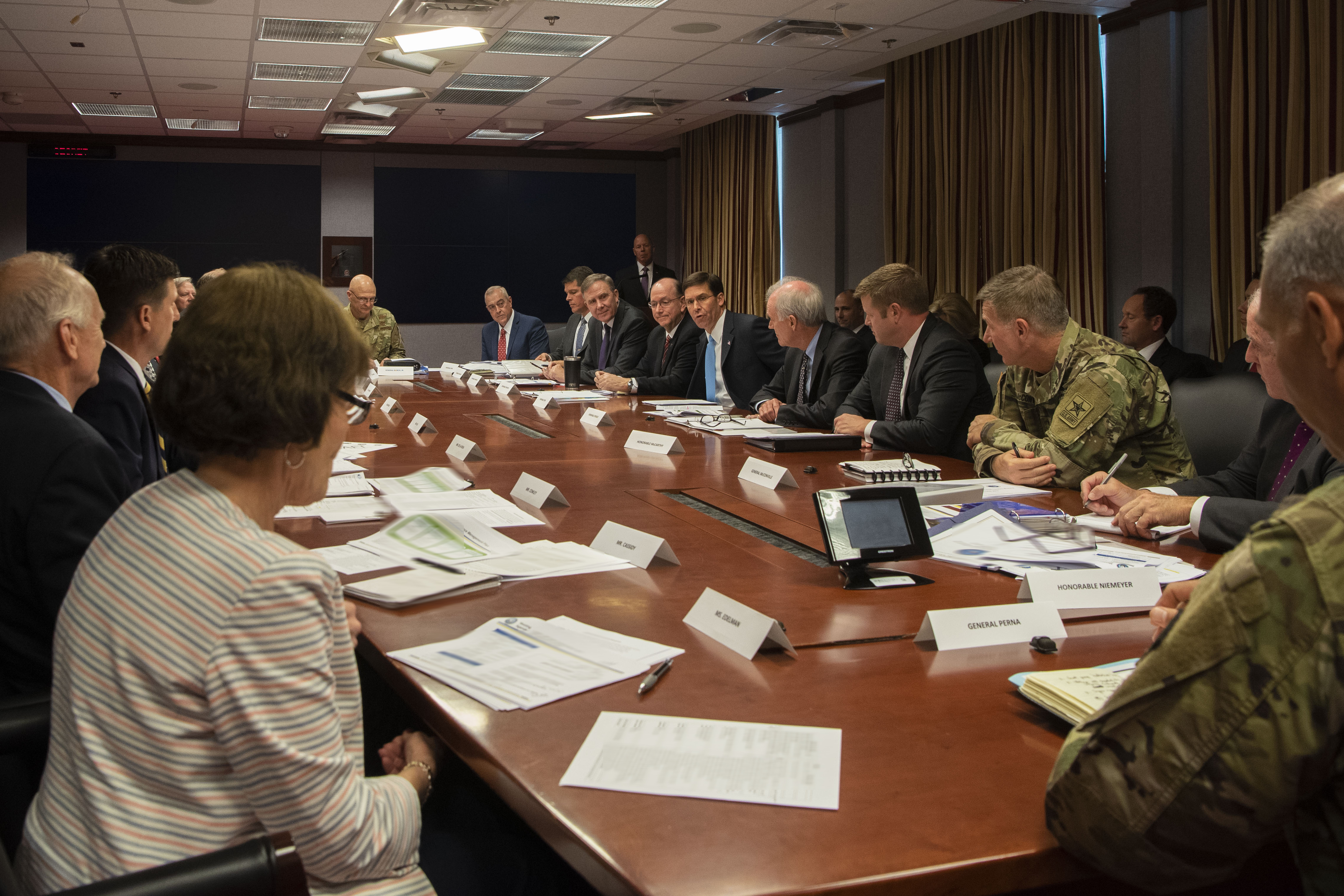
Secretary Esper meets with his civilian leadership team and military service chiefs at the Pentagon on October 2, 2019, for a tri-service roundtable to address problems with military housing.

In his memoir, Esper expressed concern that appointed civilian officials were not sufficiently exercising their authority and that the military-run combatant commands had grown too powerful. He wrote that "restoring the proper civilian-military balance was an issue that [he] would work hard to achieve." This was also an issue highlighted by the congressionally-chartered National Defense Strategy Commission in its November 2018 report. Esper's aims were implemented through the civilian run Office of the Secretary of Defense (OSD), such as the Policy office, and through the civilian secretaries of the military departments.

To restore the proper civilian-military balance while also improving coordination across the department, Esper invited the civilian secretaries of the armed services into planning meetings and war plan reviews with the combatant commanders. He also began meeting frequently with his senior civilian leaders on issues ranging from operational and modernization plans, to matters such as housing, personnel policy, and COVID response. Importantly, Esper ensured that the head of DoD's Policy office – and other civilian leaders as appropriate – were properly integrated into the war planning processes, as well as global force management and deployment issues. The Policy office was also directed to develop a single integrated plan to strengthen allies and build partners as one of the original ten NDS implementation objectives. This first of its kind strategy, dubbed the Guidance for the Development of Alliances and Partnerships (GDAP), enabled the Pentagon to prioritize and align its security cooperation activities to build greater partner capacity; better articulate DoD's needs for their priority warfighting roles; and help them shape their militaries into more capable forces. The OSD Personnel and Readiness office, alternatively, was tasked to develop joint training and exercise plans to enhance the readiness and deployability of U.S. forces, which required the Joint Staff to assess select units around the globe in order to test and validate the new Immediate Response Force and Dynamic Force Employment concepts that Esper was implementing.

The combatant commands were also scrutinized in detail to find budget savings and efficiencies. Their mission statements were similarly reviewed, as were the "requirements" driving their operations, and funding back doors were closed. In his memoir, Esper said he viewed these actions as also contributing to a reassertion of proper civilian control over the military by imposing accountability and fiscal discipline on the combatant commands, and ensuring senior civilian appointees were involved in these processes.

=== Modernization of the Armed Forces ===
Secretary Esper speaks with a F-22 Raptor pilot from the 19th Fighter Squadron while sitting in the cockpit of the world's most advanced fighter aircraft at Joint Base Pearl Harbor-Hickam, Hawaii.

During Esper's tenure, the Pentagon identified eleven modernization initiatives that were considered key game changers for DoD. Technologies, such as artificial intelligence (AI), hypersonics, quantum science, biotechnology, directed energy, microelectronics, and 5G were deemed critical to ensuring the U.S. military's continued overmatch in the decades to come. Billions of dollars were invested in these initiatives, marking the FY 2021 budget submission as the largest research and development funding proposal in the department's history. Modernization roadmaps were also released for these technologies.

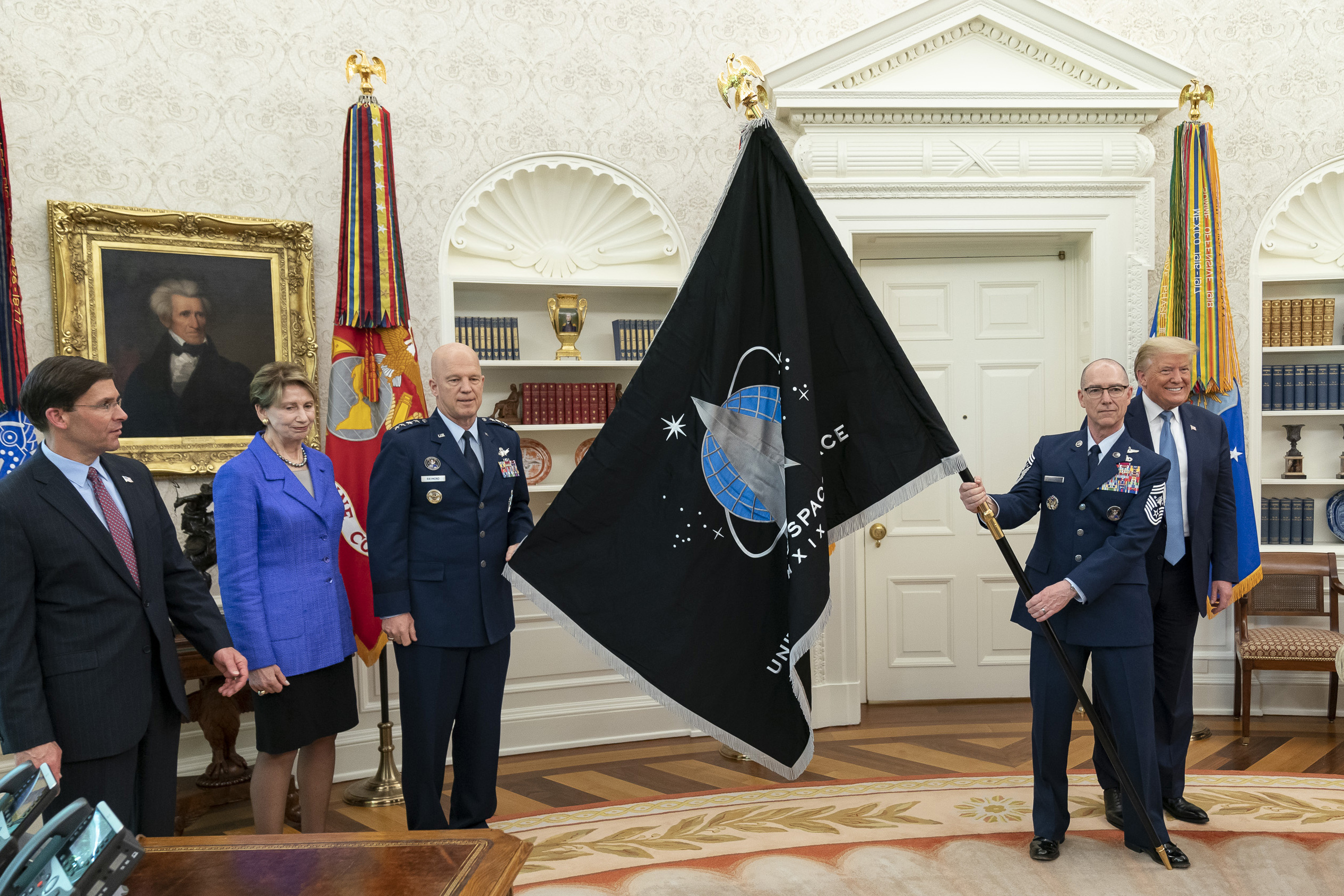
Secretary Esper presents the flag of the U.S. Space Force at the White House on May 15, 2020. Esper established the Space Force as the newest branch of the Armed Forces in December 2019.

Esper considered AI to be the most critical technology for DoD to develop and proliferate across the military services and their warfighting functions. This was a theme he pressed as Army Secretary, exemplified by his establishment of the Army's first AI Task Force at Carnegie Mellon University in Pittsburgh in early 2019. Esper argued that AI would "change the character of warfare for generations to come" and that it would "afford decisive and enduring advantages to whoever harnessed and mastered it first." To help achieve these ends, the fielding of AI was scaled up through the Joint Artificial Intelligence Center to meet the department's needs; the first official chief data officer was established under the chief information officer; and the first DoD data strategy to guide improvements on the availability and reliability of department information was released.

In February 2020, Esper approved the first-ever AI Ethics Principles to establish DoD and the United States as the global leader in the responsible development and use of artificial intelligence.

=== Building a Better U.S. Navy ===
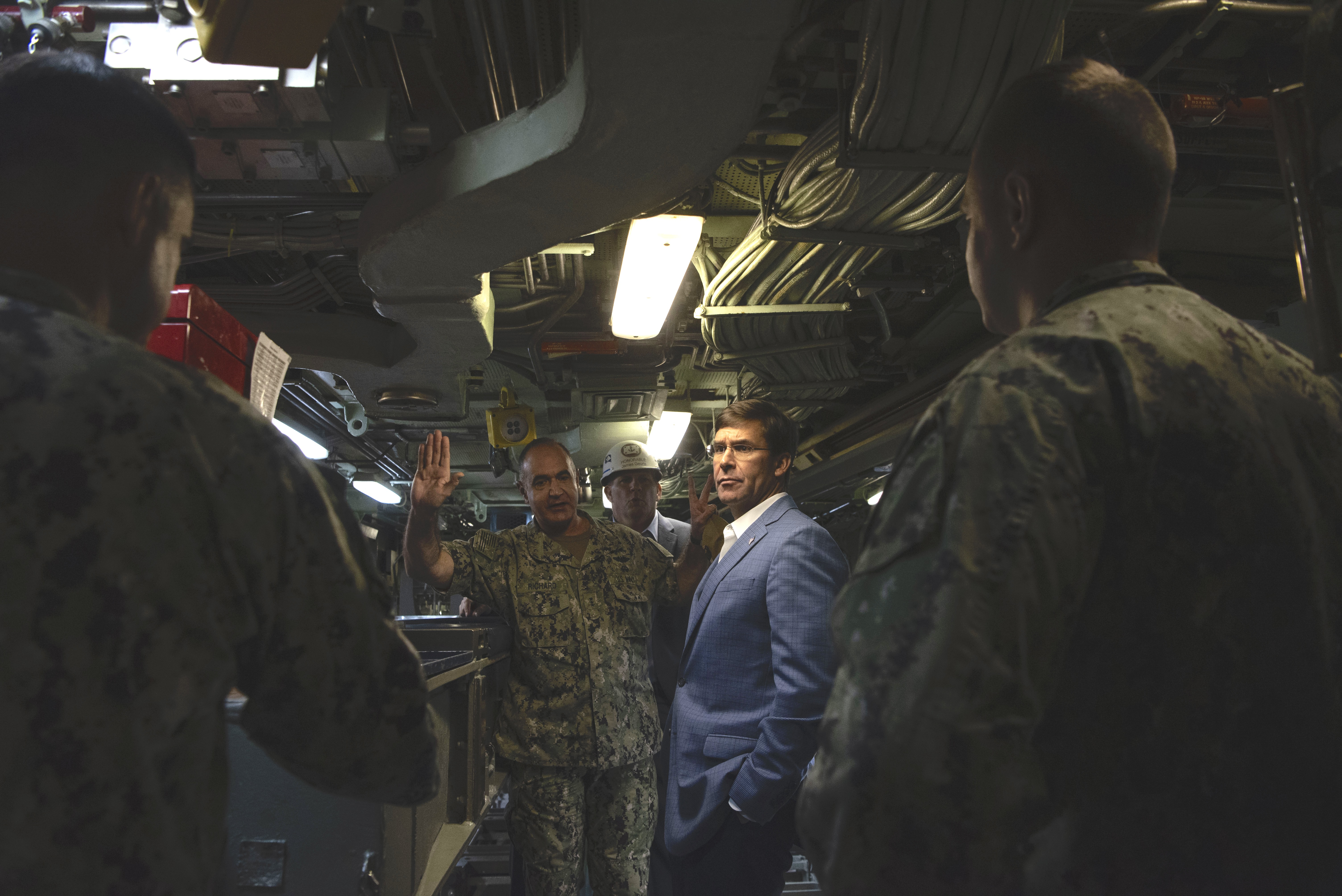
Secretary Esper visits a nuclear attack submarine in Norfolk, Virginia, on September 25, 2019. His plans to modernize the military included a new force structure for the U.S. Navy that focused on building at least three nuclear attack submarines a year.

Given the declining ship count and readiness of the U.S. Navy, coupled with what Esper viewed as a stale modernization plan at a time when the importance of maritime forces was growing, Esper organized a team of internal and outside experts in early 2020 to look at new force options. He directed that any future fleet must optimize the following attributes: distributed lethality and awareness; survivability in a high intensity conflict; adaptability for a complex world; ability to project power, control the seas, and demonstrate presence; and finally, the capability to deliver precision effects at very long ranges. At the same time, the future force design had to be affordable in an era of tight budgets, sustainable over the long term, and operationally ready at higher rates.

The task force developed a more balanced Navy of over 500 crewed and uncrewed ships that was called Battle Force 2045. The plan would reach over 350 traditional line ships prior to 2035 – the year China aimed to fully modernize its military. And the entire battle force would be completed by 2045, four years prior to Beijing's goal of building a world-class military.

Under the proposal revealed in October 2020, Battle Force 2045 would include a much larger and more capable submarine force. Esper said, “If we do nothing else, we should invest in attack submarines”, by building three attack submarines a year as soon as possible. Regarding aircraft carriers, the plan made clear that nuclear-powered carriers would remain the nation's most visible deterrent, but the fleet should not necessarily be built around them. Rather, a serious look at light conventional carriers needed to be taken.

The future force would comprise between 140 and 240 uncrewed and optionally crewed surface and sub-surface vessels that could perform a wide range of missions, from resupply and surveillance to mine laying and missile strikes. These ships would add significant offensive and defensive capabilities to the fleet at an affordable cost in terms of both sailors and dollars. Next, the team determined that the future fleet needed more and smaller surface combatants. Adding sixty to seventy lighter combatants would not only increase capacity to conduct distributed maritime operations but would also free other critical assets for more efficient mission distribution. Lastly, strategic lift and logistics vessels were also a priority given their importance in delivering ground forces to the fight and sustaining distributed operations. Esper was adamant that Battle Force 2045 would be the more lethal, survivable, adaptable, sustainable, and larger force needed to deal with China in the 21st Century.

=== NATO and Europe ===
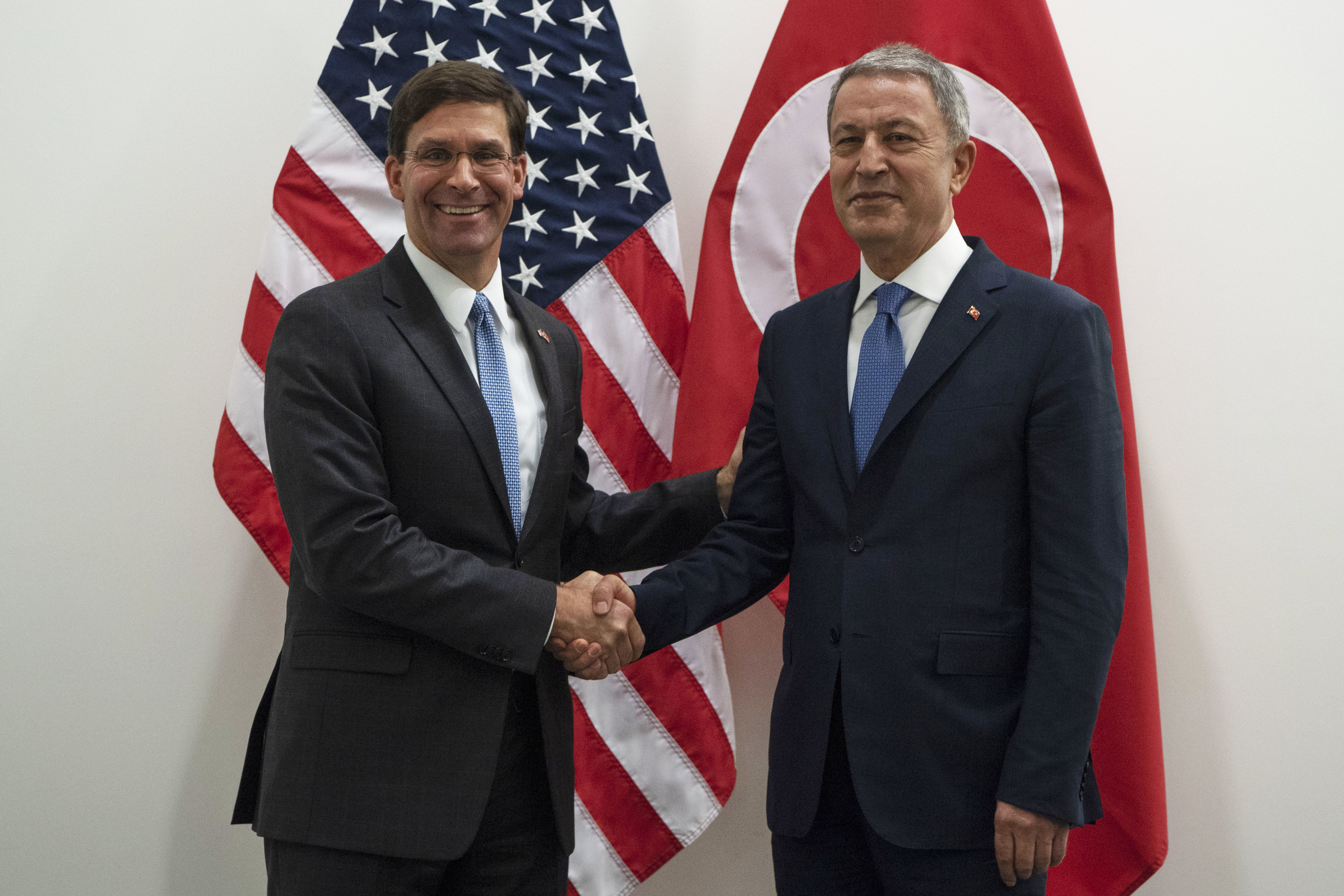
Esper with Turkish defense minister Hulusi Akar at NATO headquarters in Brussels, June 2019

In June 2019, just days after the White House announcement that Trump would nominate him to become Secretary of Defense, and weeks prior to his Senate confirmation, Esper traveled to Brussels for a meeting of NATO defense ministers. During a press conference at NATO headquarters, Esper remarked that he supported NATO, reminding the press corps that he served in the alliance as a U.S. Army officer stationed in Italy in the early 1990s, and worked on alliance issues during his many years in Washington, D.C. policy circles. Esper stated, "We’ve had no change in our commitment to NATO," adding that "My goal is to strengthen our alliance and improve our readiness." He also said that adequate funding by NATO members was critical to the alliance's strength, and that all allies need to live up to their GDP spending commitments as essential to deterring Russian aggression.

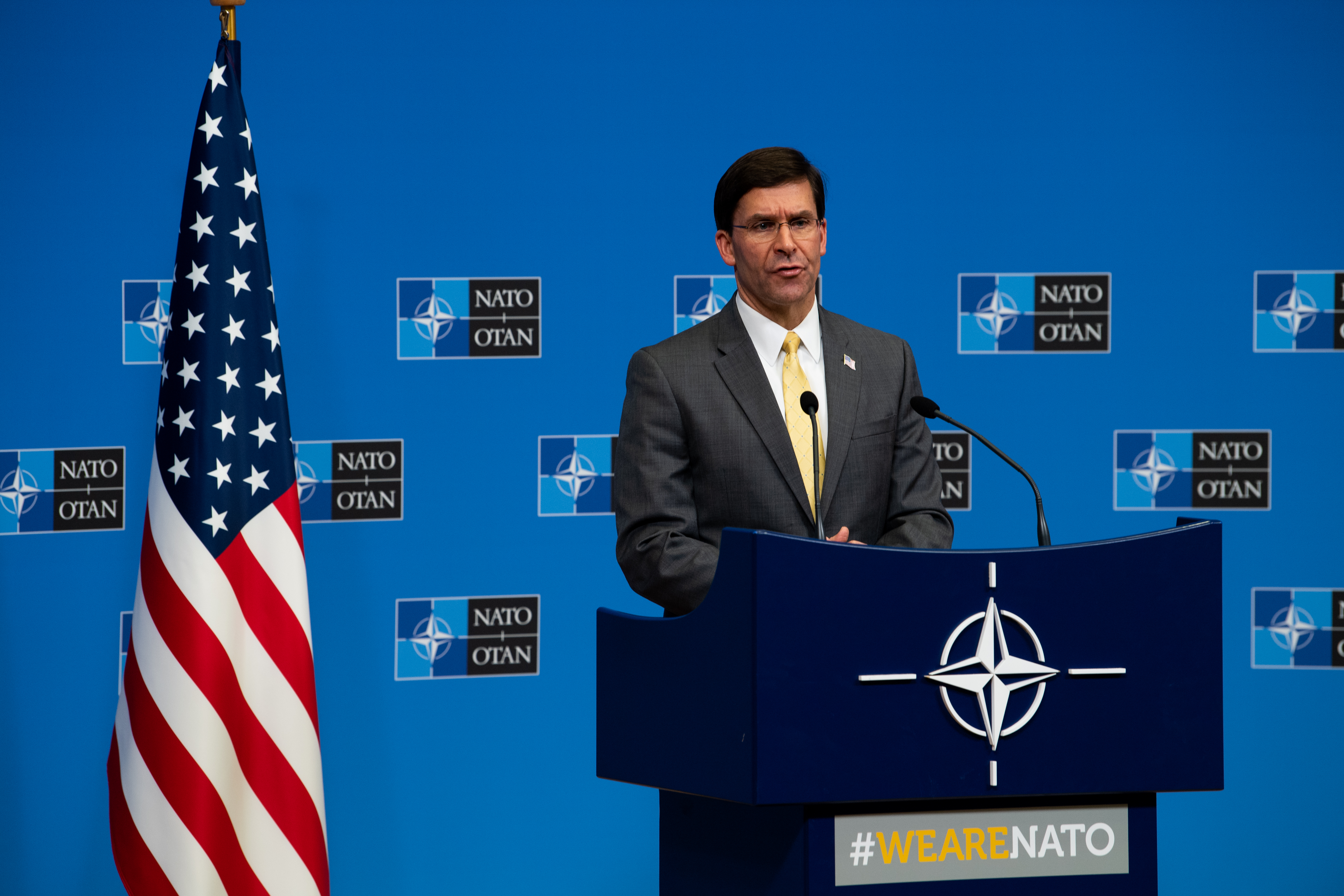
Secretary Esper speaks to the press at NATO headquarters in February 2020.

Esper met with his European counterparts in February 2020 to discuss basing options for a new United States Army headquarters in Europe, bearing the name "V Corps" that had originally been established in World War I but was inactivated while stationed in Germany in 2013. Esper stated the new headquarters was needed to improve military coordination among NATO partners. Esper had established V Corps when he was Army Secretary a year earlier. This initiative, along with others such as deploying mobile air defense units to Europe and resurrecting the major Cold War exercise of deploying large numbers of U.S. troops annually to the continent for alliance-wide war games, was part of a comprehensive plan to enhance the capabilities of American forces and their NATO counterparts.

In response to the National Defense Authorization Act for Fiscal Year 2020, which included $738 billion in defense spending, Esper said: "I'm good with those dollars. No complaints." Esper provided a framework for members of Congress to insert a proviso in the annual National Defense Authorization Act (NDAA) which guides the naming of military installations.

=== Firing of the Secretary of the Navy ===
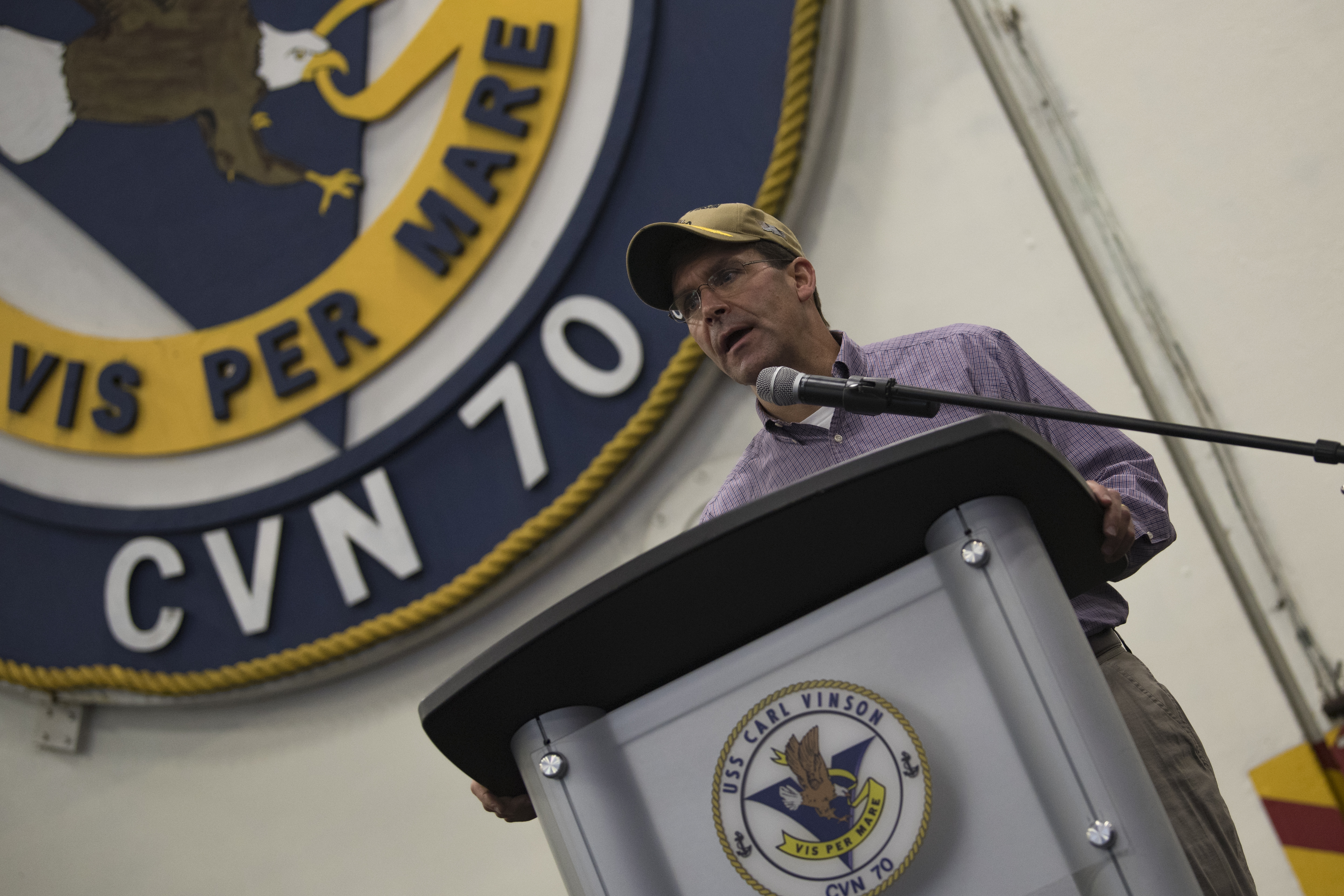
Defense Secretary Mark T. Esper speaks to sailors in an all-call on the Nimitz-class nuclear aircraft carrier USS Carl Vinson, underway in the Pacific Ocean, September 17, 2020.

On November 24, 2019, during a dispute regarding whether Navy SEAL Eddie Gallagher would be stripped of his Trident pin, Esper fired the United States secretary of the Navy, Richard Spencer. The Department of Defense attributed the firing to Spencer privately proposing to the White House (without informing Esper and contrary to Spencer's public position) an arrangement to let Gallagher retire while keeping his Trident pin. As reported by the Associated Press, Esper said this undermined the chain of command and was "completely contrary" to what he and the Pentagon leadership had agreed to – allowing the Navy disciplinary process to proceed without White House interference. Esper added "It had undermined everything [allowing the Navy process to go forward without interference] we had been discussing with the president." According to a DoD statement, "Secretary Esper's position with regard to [Uniform Code of Military Justice], disciplinary, and fitness for duty actions has always been that the process should be allowed to play itself out objectively and deliberately, in fairness to all parties." Spencer acknowledged not telling Esper about the proposal. In his CBS interview days later, Spencer said "I will take the bad on me, for not letting him know I did that." On November 25, Esper stated that Trump had ordered him to stop the Navy from conducting a peer review regarding Gallagher's right to wear the pin. Meanwhile, Trump cited the Gallagher case as the primary reason for Esper's firing of Spencer, while also citing "large cost overruns" in the Navy.

=== Afghanistan peace agreement and withdrawal ===
In late January 2019, the U.S. and the Taliban begin bilateral negotiations in Doha, Qatar, agreeing to discuss U.S./NATO military withdrawal, counterterrorism, intra-Afghan talks, and a ceasefire. By the time Esper became Secretary of Defense in July 2019, the so-called "peace deal" was nearly final. The agreement stipulated fighting restrictions for both US and the Taliban; it provided for the withdrawal of all NATO forces from Afghanistan in return for the Taliban's counter-terrorism commitments. In his memoir, Esper described the peace agreement as neither a "great deal" nor a "good deal", but saw it as a "good enough" deal to get the peace process moving forward. Given his view that a military solution to the conflict was improbable, he apparently was not optimistic about the agreement's prospects, but thought it was "worth a try after nearly two decades of fighting and over 2,300 Americans killed". Esper asserts in his memoir that, because of these factors, he made clear that his and DoD's support for the deal rested on an internal agreement that U.S. implementation be "conditions based". In other words, the U.S. would not continue with the process, and eventually not fulfill its obligations under the deal, unless the Taliban did the same.

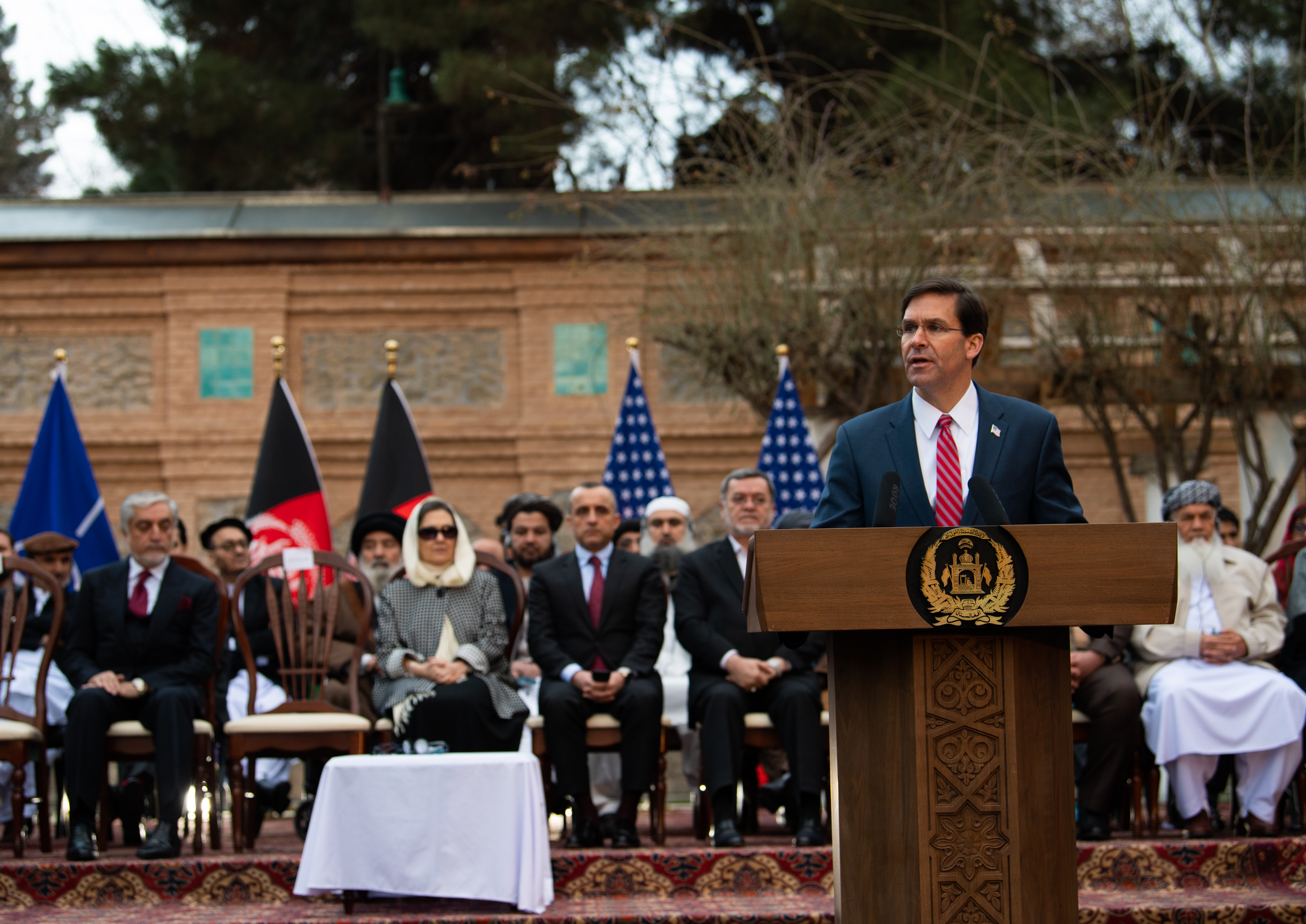
Defense Secretary Mark Esper speaks at the U.S.–Afghanistan Joint Declaration Announcement in Kabul, Afghanistan on February 29, 2020. Esper repeatedly said that he supported the peace process, provided it was "conditions based".

On February 29, 2020, the Trump administration signed a conditional peace agreement with the Taliban, which called for the withdrawal of American troops from Afghanistan within 14 months, if the Taliban upheld the terms of the agreement. In May 2020, Esper said: "I don't put a timeline on it. We have a timeline of May of next year but that timeline was premised on everything moving at a set pace." Esper's statement appeared consistent with his oft-repeated view that implementation of the agreement must be "conditions-based".

Not long thereafter, Trump reportedly pressed his cabinet to accelerate the U.S. withdrawal from Afghanistan, notwithstanding the Taliban's noncompliance with the agreement. He allegedly wanted American forces withdrawn by the November election. Esper pushed back on Trump's timeline because the conditions that would justify withdrawal had not been met - specifically a reduction in violence, progress at the negotiating table, and a credible pledge from the Taliban to publicly renounce al Qaeda, among other terrorist groups. Moreover, Esper wanted the drawdown to be done in a coordinated and deliberate manner, and not in a rushed way that could harm U.S. forces and national security.

In October 2020, National Security Advisor Robert O'Brien asserted that the Afghan withdrawal was heading down to 2,500 troops over the next few months. Trump followed with a tweet saying that the U.S. "should" have the rest of its troops home by Christmas. Both remarks were viewed as political statements to excite Trump's base just weeks before the November election. The matter marked another major disagreement between Esper/DoD, and the White House.

Esper declined to wade into the matter publicly. Instead, he called together his civilian and military leaders for their views. Days later, Esper purportedly sent the White House a classified memo asserting that it was the unanimous recommendation of the chain of command that the U.S. not draw down its troop presence in Afghanistan any further until conditions were met. Instead, Esper argued that the U.S. military hold at 4,500 service members in country.

A senior administration source said the Esper memo expressed concerns that further reductions with conditions unmet, not to mention a precarious withdrawal from the country, could alienate US allies, who at the time provided more service members in Afghanistan than the US; risk "Green-on-Blue" attacks on American service members by anxious Afghan soldiers; erode the credibility and standing of the US around the world; impact the Afghan military, which relies on US "enablers" such as logistics and air support; and, perhaps most importantly, undermine efforts to get the Taliban to live up to their end of the peace agreement. In his memoir, Esper stated that the U.S. did have leverage with the Taliban: "the threat of U.S. forces not leaving Afghanistan and, even more compelling, the resumption of U.S. military operations against the Taliban". Esper added that as much as he wanted to exit Afghanistan, the best course available remained a political agreement that achieved the original purpose behind the U.S. invasion of Afghanistan - to "decimate al Qaeda" and ensure Afghanistan "never again became a safe haven for terrorists who wanted to attack the United States." As such, he reportedly argued for "strategic patience" accompanied by a willingness to use military force or "do whatever else was necessary to ensure compliance with the agreement".

On November 17, 2020, eight days after Esper's departure, Trump directed the reduction of U.S. forces to 2,500 troops. Esper's views on Afghanistan and pushback on Trump's desires to accelerate the drawdown reportedly contributed to his dismissal on November 9.

=== Withdrawal of U.S. forces from Germany ===
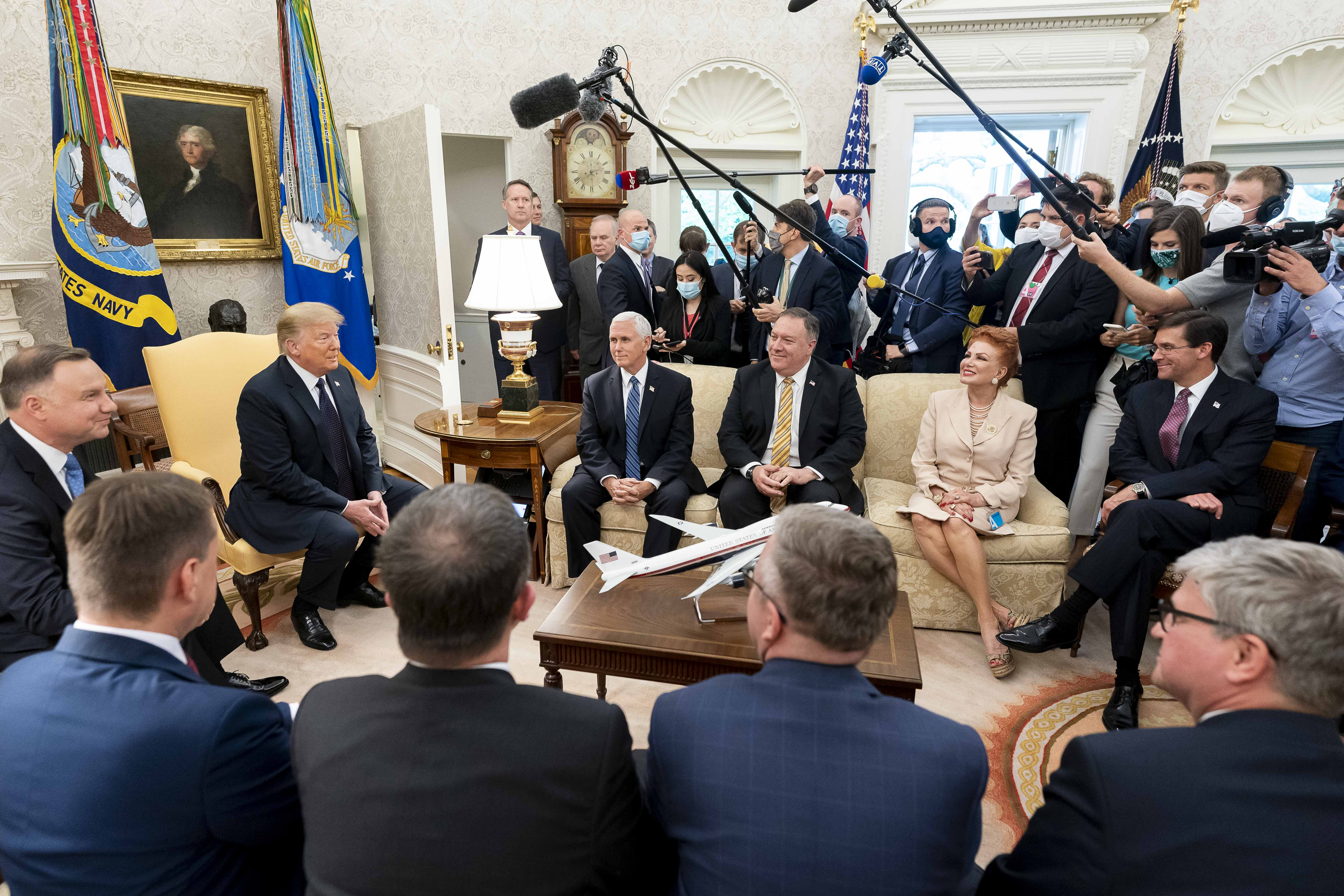
Esper (far right), President Donald Trump, and Polish president Andrzej Duda at the White House on June 24, 2020

In 2020, Trump directed the Pentagon to remove 11,800 of the nearly 35,000 American troops stationed in Germany. Trump said the move was partially influenced by U.S. frustration with the Nord Stream 2 gas pipeline from Russia to Germany, owned by Russia's Gazprom; cited Germany's unwillingness to spend more on defense in support of NATO and accused Germany of being "very delinquent"; and said of Germany: "They make a fortune off the troops. They build cities around our troops. ... We'll let ourselves get rich first." While Trump framed the withdrawal as an act of retribution against the Germans, Esper cited a different rationale, framing the decision in strategic terms, although he acknowledged that Trump's anger at German military spending "accelerated" the process. Esper agreed with Trump that Germany was a "rich country" that "can and should pay more for its defense."

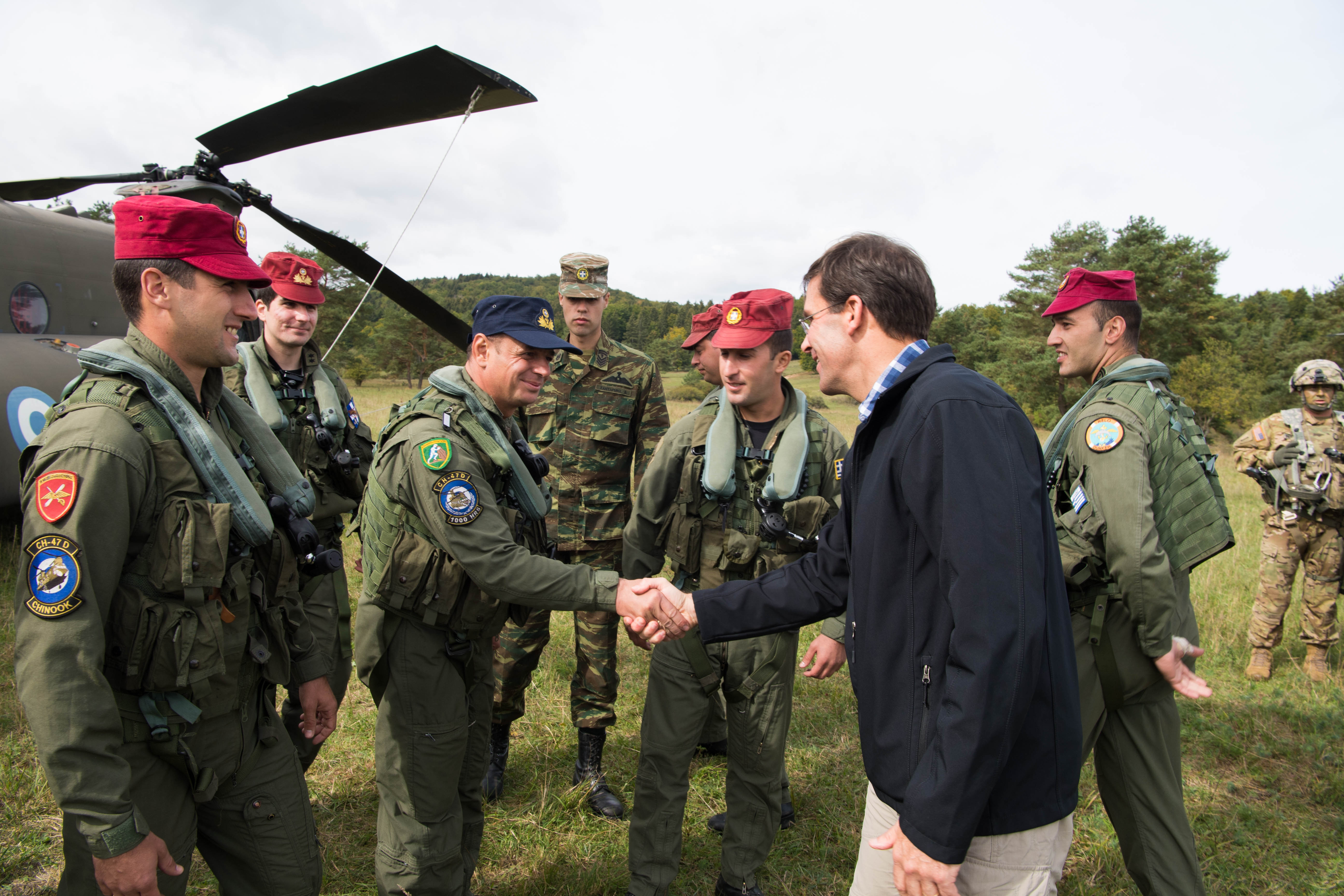
Secretary of the Army Mark T. Esper visits with U.S. and Allied soldiers conducting field training on his visit to Joint Multinational Readiness Training in Hohenfels, Germany Sept. 22, 2018.

The idea for a significant reduction of troops from Germany originated from the White House, where it was pushed by two Trump advisers, Robert C. O'Brien and Richard Grenell. Esper had fended off Trump's demands to withdraw troops from Europe for months, citing a strategic review he had underway for all combatant commands, including U.S. European Command (EUCOM). Defense Department officials, largely cut off from the final troop withdrawal decision, feared a partial withdrawal from Germany would inhibit regional defenses against Russia. Despite significant concerns, Esper avoided publicly criticizing the plan and worked to implement Trump's directive in a way that wouldn't harm national security.

Esper reportedly directed European Command to develop options that met five key principles: 1) strengthen NATO, 2) reassure Allies, 3) enhance Russian deterrence, 4) improve U.S. strategic flexibility and EUCOM's operational agility, and 5) take care of American service members and their families. Esper's five key principles for troop withdrawal were met by the final plan EUCOM presented; the plan was further approved by the Pentagon. Though the final plan withdrew troops from Germany, it reunited these forces with like ones or their parent units in other allied countries. Additionally, combat forces and headquarters were deployed further east, closer to the Russian border, to enhance deterrence, security, and operation readiness.

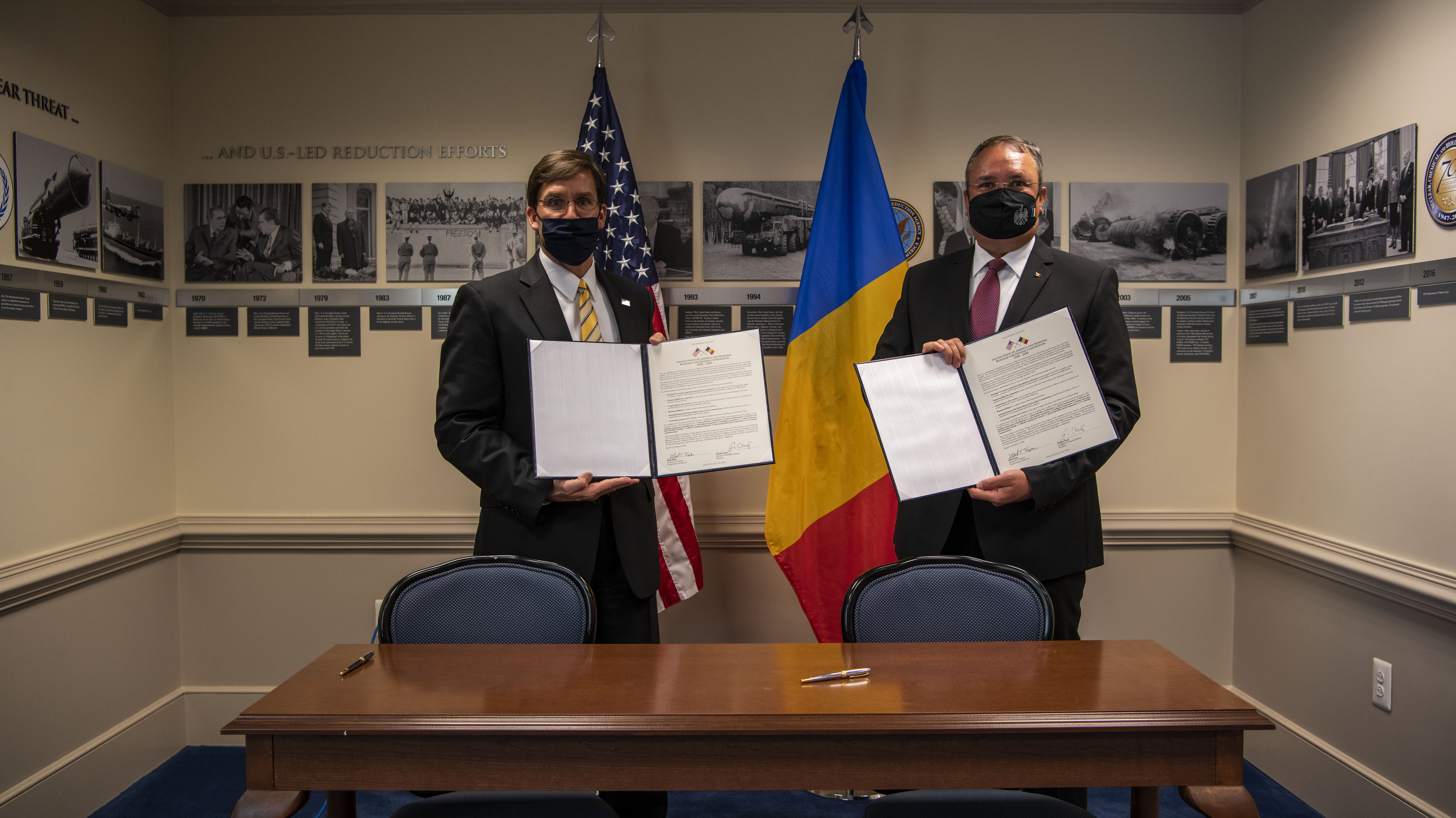
Secretary of Defense Mark T. Esper meets with Romanian minister of defense Nicolae Ciuca at the Pentagon on October 8, 2020. Esper's plans to reposition U.S. forces in Europe included deploying troops to Romania, closer to the eastern flank of NATO and Russia.

Esper reportedly believed that Trump's demand for speedy troop withdrawal was logistically impossible and strategically risky. As a result, Esper did not return as many forces to the United States, as desired by White House staff. The Associated Press reported that "A number of NATO diplomats and officials have suggested the pullout—which would be costly and might not even be logistically possible before the U.S. elections in November—probably won't happen."

Trump's announcement of the withdrawal of U.S. troops was made without consultation with Germany or other NATO allies. In June 2020, Esper traveled to NATO headquarters in Brussels to meet privately with NATO secretary general Jens Stoltenberg to brief him on his plans and to reassure him that the U.S. would not announce any further troop movements or reductions without first consulting with NATO allies.

In June 2020, Trump said at a press conference with Polish President Andrzej Duda that the United States planned to move some U.S. troops from Germany to Poland. Esper backed Trump's decision, saying that the Pentagon wants to send more troops to the Baltic states, Poland and Romania, consistent with the final force redeployment plan he approved a few months later.

=== COVID-19 pandemic ===
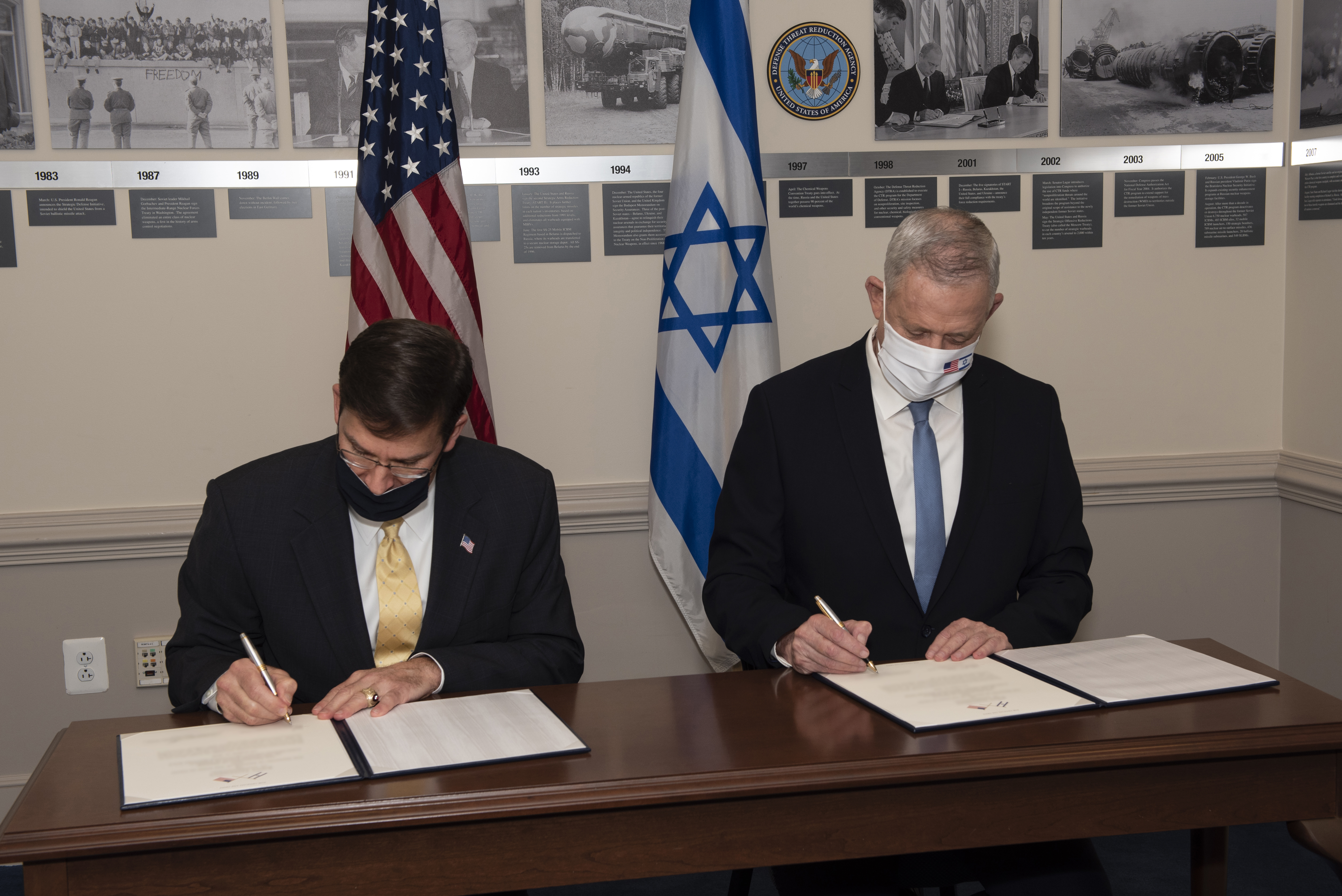
Secretary of Defense Mark T. Esper and Israeli minister of defense Benjamin Gantz signed a security document during a bilateral meeting at the Pentagon, October 22, 2020.

The Department of Defense's role in combatting the COVID-19 pandemic began in mid-January 2020, when the department began tracking cases worldwide. On February 1, 2020, weeks before the first person in the U.S. would succumb to the virus, the Defense Department implemented its pandemic global response plan.

Three days prior, on January 29, 2020, the military welcomed the first plane load of Americans evacuated from China into March Reserve Air Base in California, and then quarantined and cared for them for several weeks. This type of operation occurred multiple times over a period of months across several military installations and states.

On January 30, a week after the first COVID case in America was detected, Esper issued the first of what would eventually become a dozen medical guidance memos to the department on how to protect the military and civilian personnel from COVID.

As the coronavirus outbreak turned into a pandemic in early March 2020 Esper said that "My No. 1 priority remains to protect our forces and their families." The following week, Esper directed the deployment of two Navy hospital ships, the USNS Comfort and the USNS Mercy, to take pressure off New York and Los Angeles hospitals as they coped with the pandemic. Esper also authorized the Defense Department to provide civilian health authorities with five million respirator masks and 2,000 specialized ventilators.

In early April 2020, acting secretary of the Navy Thomas Modly removed Navy captain Brett Crozier from command of the aircraft carrier USS Theodore Roosevelt after Crozier pleaded with Navy leaders to move more quickly to in the face of a coronavirus outbreak on the ship. Esper defended Modly's decision. Within days, widespread condemnation led Modly to resign. Esper named James McPherson, Under Secretary of the Army, to replace him.

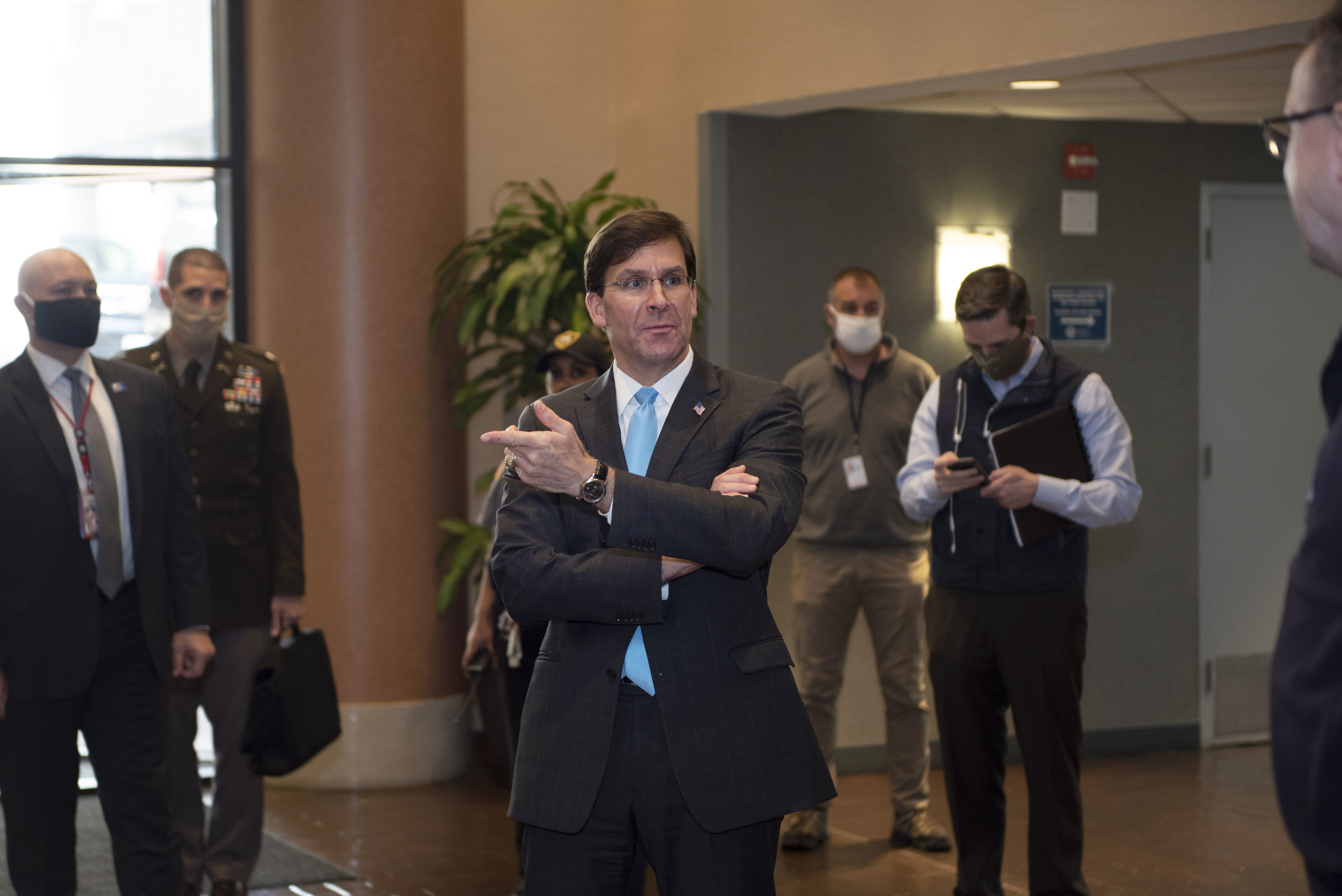
Esper visits FEMA headquarters in Washington, D.C., during the COVID-19 pandemic, April 15, 2020

At a White House briefing on March 18, 2020, Esper said the Army Corps of Engineers met with New York officials and proposed building Alternate Care Facilities (ACFs) to create more bed space in anticipation of accelerating COVID caseloads. The first location was designated at the Javits Center in New York City, which soon became the largest hospital in the country with a 2,500 bed capacity.

Eventually, the Defense Department set up 38 ACFs nationwide and deployed hundreds of medical professionals to over 30 major metropolitan areas across the country.

Separately, the Pentagon opened 16 certified coronavirus testing labs, made available up to 5 million respirator masks and other personal protective equipment from its own reserves, distributed up to 2,000 deployable ventilators to the Department of Health and Human Services, and began transporting testing equipment and medical items from overseas providers.

On March 24, 2020, Esper held the first of many "virtual town halls" for service members, Department of Defense employees, and their families to address the pandemic. In order to lessen the burden on all Defense Department personnel while ensuring continued operations in a safe manner, Esper noted that the Department of Defense was transitioning to a conditions-based, phased approach to personnel movement and travel. He also announced that the Pentagon was providing commanders with additional guidance as they look to change health protection condition levels at Department of Defense installations. The guidelines were structured to support risk-based decision-making in line with local conditions, Centers for Disease Control and Prevention (CDC) guidance, and in consultation with medical leadership, as Commanders' begin to return to normal operations .

On April 5, 2020, the secretary of defense issued "Guidance on the Use of Cloth Face Coverings" two days after the CDC issued a national recommendation to do so, making the Defense Department the first governmental agency to implement this action. Esper told ABC News that "we are going to take every measure to protect our troops."

On April 14, 2020, Esper announced the extension of a travel freeze on military members and Department of Defense civilian employees. The original order to stop movement was to last for 60 days, but Esper said that additional time was needed to stop the spread of the virus. Several days following the announcement, Esper extended the freeze through June 30, 2020.

Despite the Department of Defense's efforts, and bipartisan support from most members of Congress, a few lawmakers, retired officers and experts criticized Esper's response to the coronavirus. According to Politico, there was some discontent within the Department of Defense about Esper's centralized planning/decentralized action approach to the issue. Esper primarily left it up to local commanders in terms of how they would implicate his guidance and respond to the pandemic, which resulted in uneven responses. Following this story, in a late April 2020 letter, ten Democratic senators called Esper's leadership "disjointed and slow", saying that DoD's civilian leadership had "failed to act sufficiently, quickly, and has often prioritized [combat] readiness at the expense of the health of service members and their families." A Pentagon spokesman defended DoD's handling of the pandemic stating: "as the Secretary has restated time and time again, our top priorities are our service members, their families and all of our civilian contract personnel, and continuing our national security missions to include help the American people confront this crisis". The spokesman said Esper "made a clear, unambiguous decision to provide constant guidance to senior civilian and military leaders", including issuing force health protection guidance starting in late January, but reiterated that "diverse missions have diverse levels of flexibility."

Esper personally responded to the criticism in a letter to the chairman of the Senate Armed Services Committee, Senator James Inhofe, stating that the allegations were "false and misleading assertions" given the weekly updates provided by the Defense Department to Congress, adding that the department has been "ahead of need at every step" and "met or exceeded every request for assistance we have received."

Esper also pushed back on the letter's criticism of his delegation of many decision to local commanders, calling that "standard military practice that goes back decades". He further noted "to somehow suggest that the guidance went out to people that don't know how to implement it is just ridiculous", highlighting the "extensive" medical staffs of service secretaries and commanders to whom the memos were issued.

Supporters of the Department of Defense said these criticisms failed to account for the fact that, despite DoD being on the front lines of the COVID-19 fight for over three months, only one active duty service member had succumbed to the virus. Others pointed out that many of the ten Democrats who signed the letter were under active consideration to be Joe Biden's running mate in the 2020 presidential election, suggesting this was a political act to burnish their own credentials for the job.

A thought piece by the center-left Brookings Institution supported Esper's actions, stating that "part of the success to-date in keeping COVID-19 out of the ranks is due to the prudence of commanders around the country and the world, who have been given flexibility by Secretary of Defense Mark Esper to take measures they deem appropriate.". Esper's approach was also consistent with guidance put out by Anthony Fauci, a distinguished physician and immunologist.

In May 2020, at an event marking the 75th anniversary of the Allied victory in Europe, Esper briefly interacted with seven WWII veterans who had requested a photo opportunity with him. The veterans, all between the ages of 96 and 100, were not wearing facemasks, nor was Esper. In response to critics, the administration said that Esper and the veterans were tested before the event and had generally followed social distancing guidelines. The organization sponsoring the veterans stated that the men all wanted to hold the ceremony despite COVID, and none reported getting ill following it.

In his memoir, Esper stated that by November 2020, the Defense Department had lost "only one active duty service member--out of 1.2 million--to COVID-19." The broader U.S. population, he asserts, had a mortality rate that was 365 times greater, demonstrating that the actions taken by the military during his tenure had been successful.

=== Operation Warp Speed ===
On May 15, 2020, the president announced the establishment of "Operation Warp Speed", the administration's national program to accelerate the development of COVID-19 medical countermeasures. The Defense Department would work with the Department of Health and Human Services (HHS) in a public-private partnership to develop, produce, and distribute a COVID vaccine by the end of 2020. Esper and HHS Secretary Alex Azar co-led this effort.

Amid widespread skepticism that discovering a COVID vaccine in less than nine months was possible, the efforts of HHS and DoD resulted in the development of two vaccines by November, both with efficacy rates above 90%. The Food and Drug Administration approved both vaccines for emergency use one month later. Production and distribution of the vaccines accelerated thereafter, with nearly one million Americans vaccinated daily by the time the Biden Administration took office on January 20, 2021. It has been estimated that Operation Warp Speed saved over 140,000 American lives, well over $1 trillion, and millions of jobs in the first six months alone of the vaccines' use.

In his memoir, Esper cited the success of Operation Warp Speed - along with maintaining the readiness of the U.S. Armed Forces, providing extensive DoD medical support to cities and localities across the country, and losing only one active duty service member to COVID - as an important accomplishment for the Defense Department during the pandemic.

=== George Floyd protests and Insurrection Act ===
Public outrage over the May 25, 2020, murder of George Floyd, an unarmed Black man, by a police officer gave way to destructive protests in Minneapolis–Saint Paul. The night of May 28, demonstrators ignited the Third Precinct Police Station. The next morning, Esper, along with General Mark Milley and Attorney General Bill Barr, privately discouraged Trump from invoking the Insurrection Act to deploy military troops to Minneapolis.

On June 1, 2020, amid widening nationwide civil unrest, Trump at one point demanded the deployment of 10,000 active-duty troops to the streets of Washington and other U.S. cities in a heated meeting in the Oval Office with Esper and Chairman of the Joint Chiefs of Staff Mark Milley, who opposed this request. Trump's spokesperson Alyssa Farah and Attorney General William Barr denied that Trump had requested the deployment of 10,000 active-duty troops, with Barr saying instead that Trump wanted troops on "standby."

Esper participated in a June 1 call with state governors, Trump, and Barr, in which Trump urged governors to "dominate" and use aggressive methods. During the call, Esper said, "I think the sooner that you mass and dominate the battlespace, the quicker this dissipates and we can get back to the right normal." General Mark Milley, Chairman of the Joint Chiefs of Staff, similarly spoke about the need to "dominate the battlespace" during that same call. Esper's comment that American cities were a "battlespace" prompted criticism, including from former Joint Chiefs of Staff chairman Martin E. Dempsey and former Special Operations Command head Raymond A. Thomas. At a subsequent press conference, Esper said that he did not intend the use of the term to focus "on people, and certainly not on our fellow Americans." Subsequent news reports said that Esper mistakenly used the common Pentagon term alarmed after the previous meeting that Trump intended to use active duty troops to quell the protests if the governors failed to use their National Guard troops.

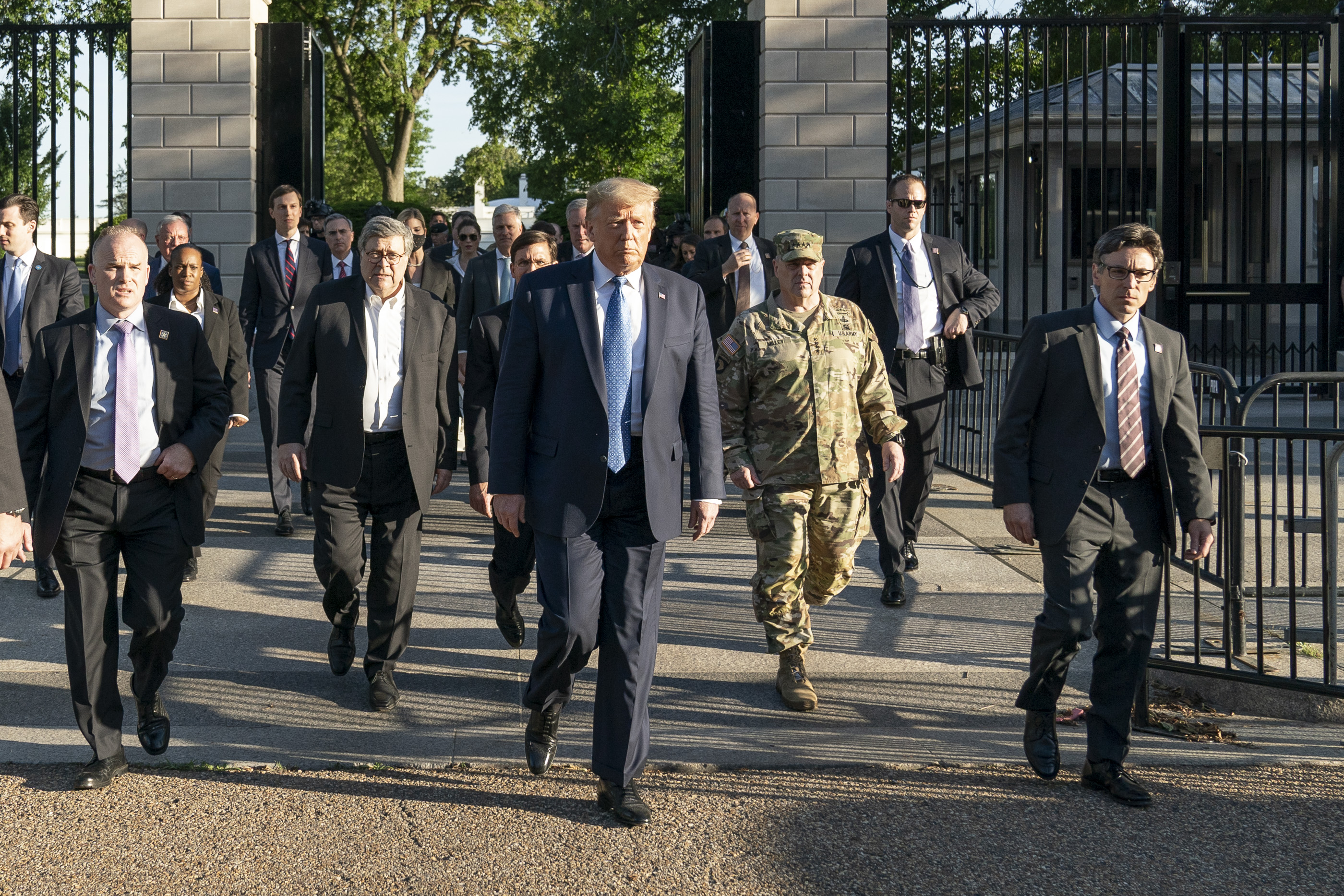
President Trump walking with an entourage to St. John's Episcopal Church for a photo op. Esper is pictured directly behind Trump.

On June 1, Esper walked alongside Trump to a photo op in front of St. John's Episcopal Church outside the White House; just prior, police in riot gear and mounted police cleared protestors who started throwing bricks and other projectiles after police began using smoke and flash grenades and a chemical irritant spray from Lafayette Square, clearing a path for Trump, Esper and several other Trump administration officials. Esper's participation in the photo op was criticized by a number of retired senior military officers.

Two days later, at a Pentagon press conference, Esper said, regarding the Lafayette Park photo op, that, "Well, I did know that we were going to the church. I was not aware of a photo op was happening," adding, "And look, I do everything I can to try to stay apolitical and try and stay out of situations that may appear political. And sometimes I'm successful at doing that, and sometimes I'm not as successful, but my aim is to keep the department out of politics to stay apolitical."

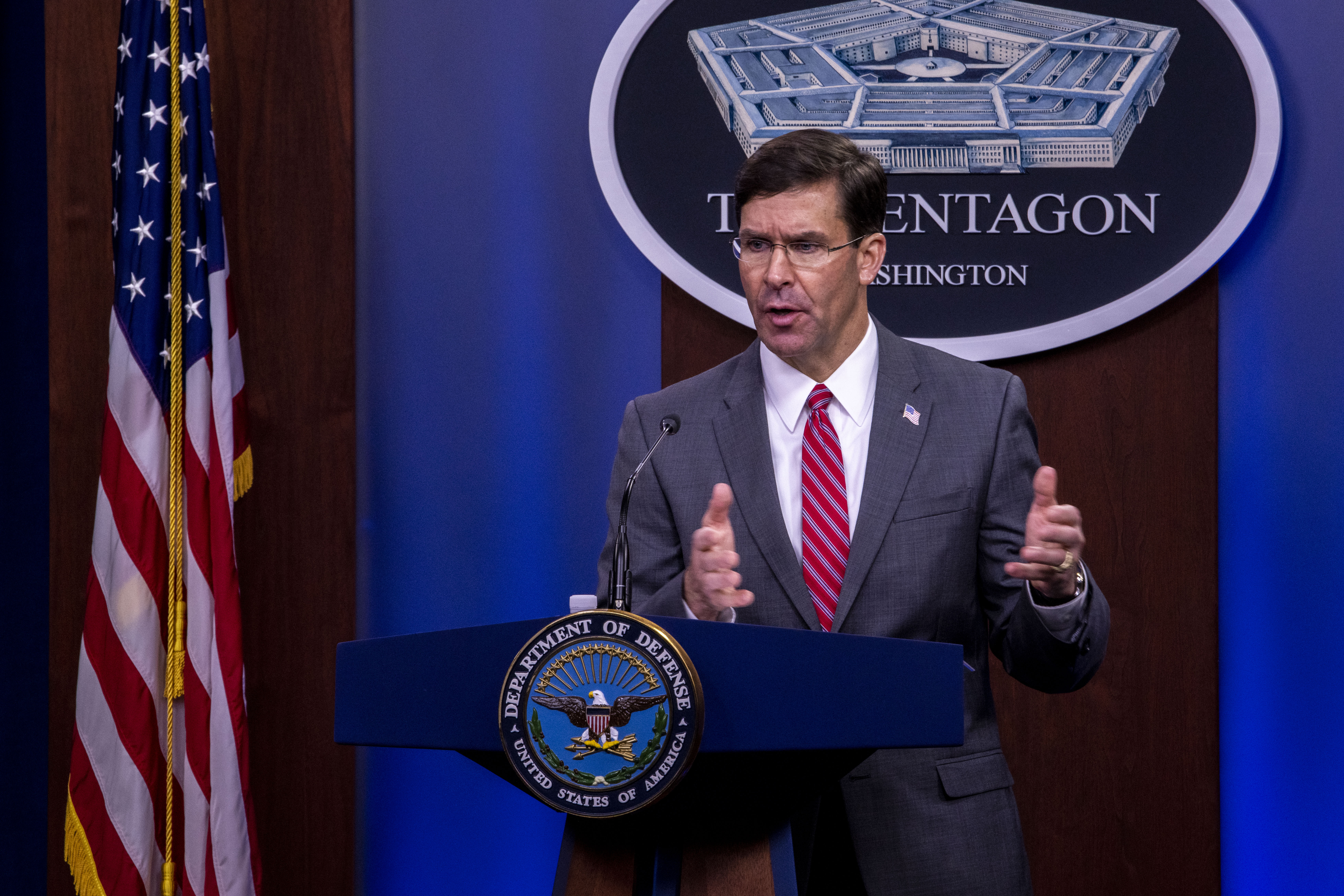
Defense Secretary Mark T. Esper held a news conference on June 3, 2020, to condemn the murder of George Floyd, support the right of Americans to protest peacefully, and to announce his opposition to invocation of the Insurrection Act in Washington, D.C.

Esper broke with Trump by publicly opposing invocation of the Insurrection Act of 1807 and the deployment of active-duty troops in American cities, saying that "the National Guard is best suited for performing domestic support to civil authorities ... I say this not only as Secretary of Defense, but also as a former soldier, and a former member of the National Guard. The option to use active duty forces in a law enforcement role should only be used as a matter of last resort, and only in the most urgent and dire of situations. We are not in one of those situations now. I do not support invoking the Insurrection Act." Esper took steps in the following days to further de-escalate the situation, removing weapons and ammunition from the National Guard, and returning troops to their home bases without notifying the White House. Trump reportedly considered firing Esper over the situation.

On June 6, the House Armed Services Committee (HASC) invited Esper and Milley to testify before the committee regarding the events of June 1; they declined. Chief spokesman Jonathan Hoffman said in statement that the pair "have not 'refused' to testify'" and that the department's "legislative affairs team remains in discussion" with the committee. HASC chairman Representative Adam Smith later acknowledged in a written letter that Esper and Milley may have been prevented from appearing by the White House. Esper and Milley subsequently agreed to appear before the House Armed Services Committee on July 9. In the meantime, on June 8, Army Secretary Ryan McCarthy briefed the committee on the presence of the National Guard in Washington, D.C., on June 1, which was during the protests.

Days later, Esper and Milley responded in detail to a series of questions asked of them by HASC chairman Smith regarding events during the week of June 1. Smith later said the Pentagon had been "reasonably cooperative" in providing witnesses to the committee amid logistical issues during the coronavirus pandemic.

=== Addressing diversity and inclusion in the U.S. military ===
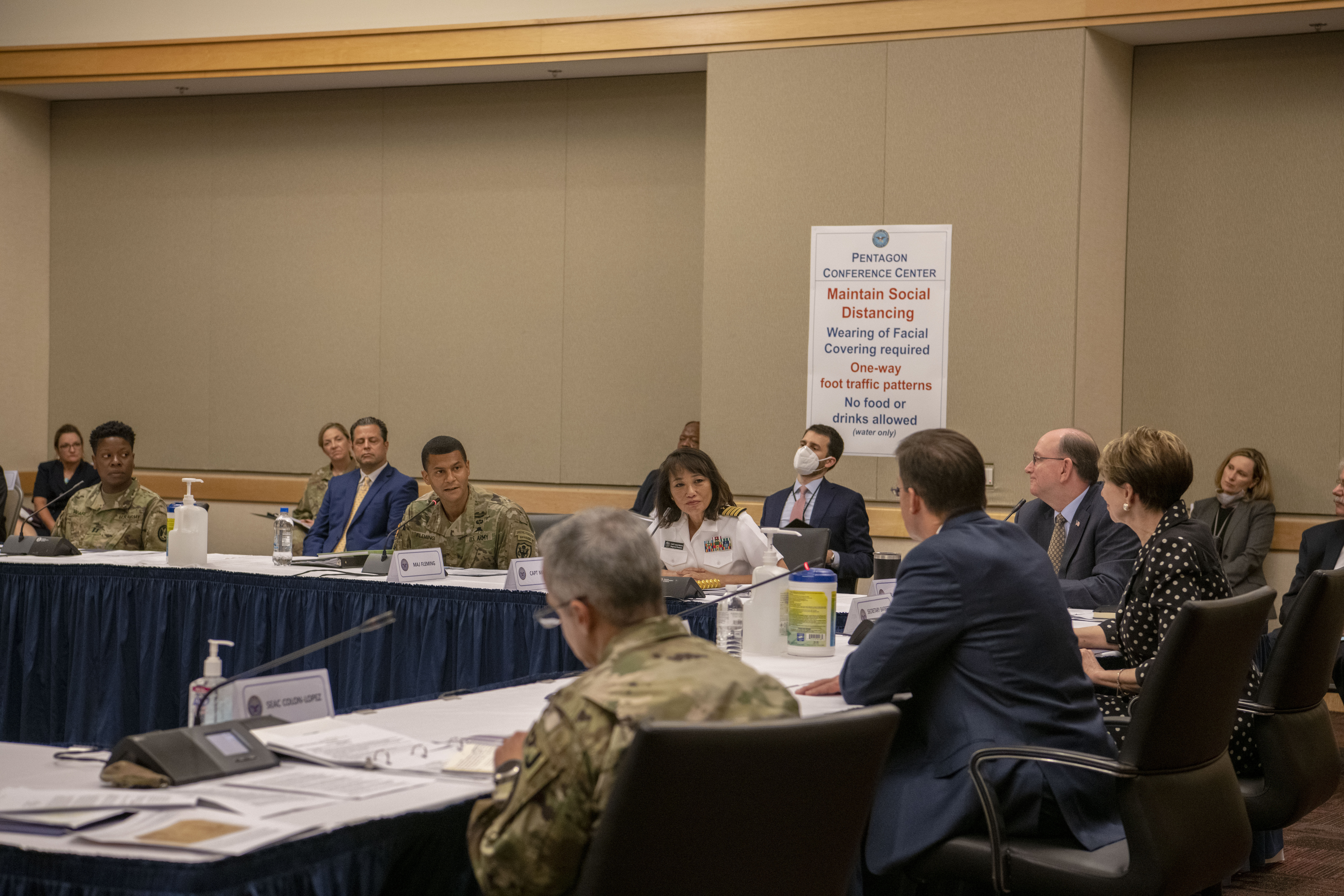
Defense Secretary Mark T. Esper meets with Defense Department leaders at the Pentagon on July 15, 2020, to address diversity and inclusion issues in the force, and how they affect readiness and warfighting.

Amid the nationwide racial unrest beginning in late May 2020, Esper directed Pentagon civilian and uniformed leaders to come up with ideas that could be used to quickly improve equal opportunity, diversity, and inclusion in the Armed Forces; established an internal Defense Board on Diversity and Inclusion in the military to recommend ways to increase racial diversity and ensure equal opportunity across all ranks, especially in the officer corps, by December 2020; and created a Defense Advisory Committee on Diversity and Inclusion in the Armed Services, mirroring the Defense Advisory Committee on Women in the Services.

On June 18, 2020, Esper said that while the Defense Department has often led on issues of race and discrimination, he cited underrepresentation of minorities in the officer ranks as a particular problem.

=== Confederate base names and symbols ===
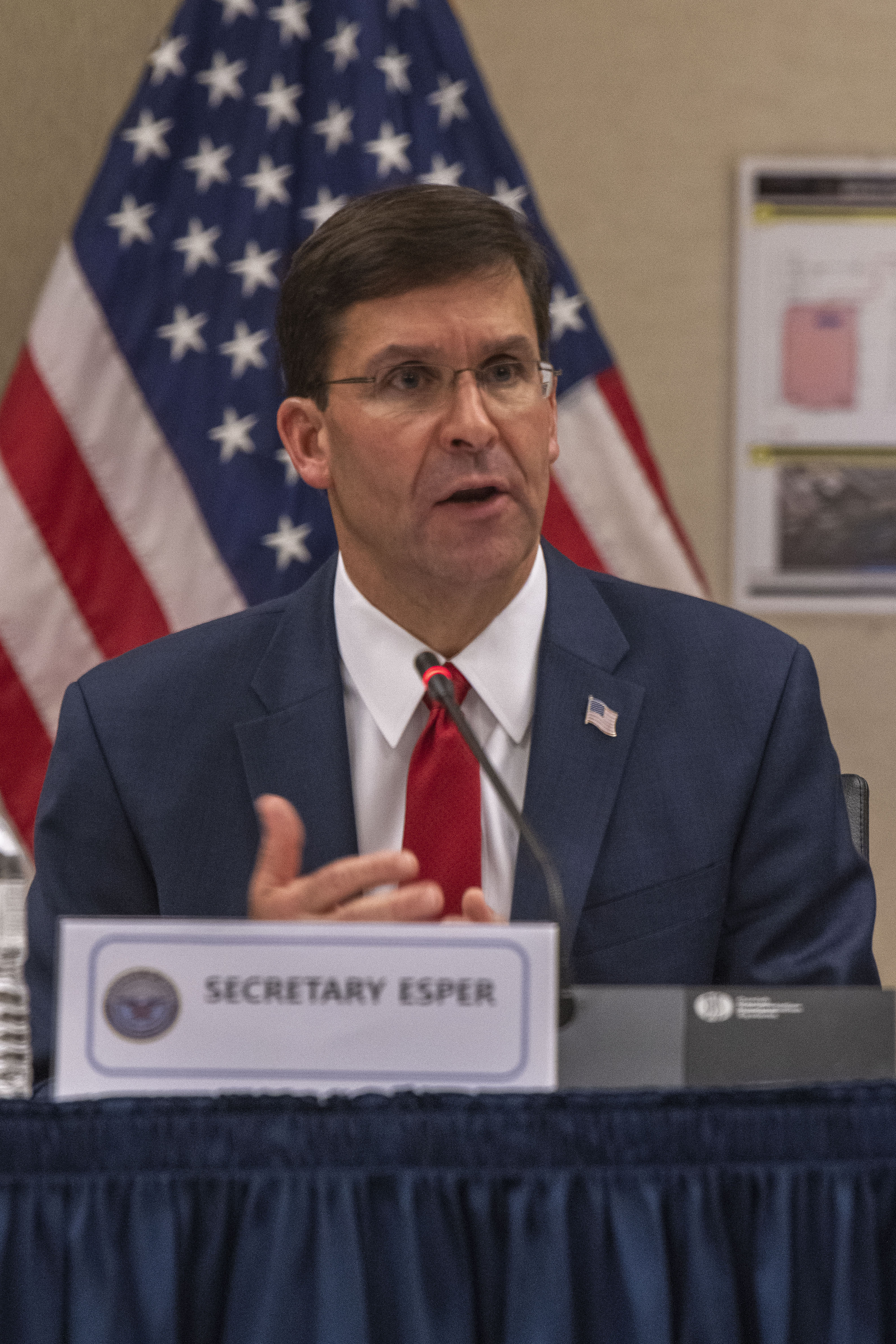
Secretary of Defense Esper promulgated a new policy in July 2020 that banned the flying of all flags other than the U.S. flag and those of U.S. states, allied countries, and military units. The policy effectively banned the display of the Confederate flag. Esper stated that his aim was to remove any real or perceived politics from the department.

In the summer of 2020 the issue of Confederate symbols on Defense Department installations reached a fever pitch in the wake of the George Floyd killing and social justice protests. Esper and Trump differed on the matter. Esper supported the renaming of military bases named after Confederate generals. The president rejected the idea, later threatening to veto the National Defense Authorization Act if Congress inserted a provision to change the base names.

In the weeks leading up to the November election, Esper was reportedly speaking with defense committee leaders in Congress who were drafting a bipartisan provision to rename the bases in order to help shape the final version. Word of this engagement may have reached the White House and added to the President's decision to dismiss him weeks later. A military official reported that Esper felt this issue was important to the morale and readiness of the force, while a DoD spokesman said "As is normal and expected, the department works with Congress to provide the administration's concerns and views regarding proposed defense-related legislation - particularly when House and Senate versions of defense bills are being reconciled and finalized". Congress eventually passed the fiscal year 2021 National Defense Authorization Act, with both the House and Senate approving bipartisan provisions that laid out a process to change the names of DoD bases named after Confederate generals and replace them.

A related issue was the flying of the Confederate flag on DoD installations. In July 2020, Esper issued a memo that banned the flying of all flags other than the U.S. flag and those of U.S. states, allied countries, and military units. The memo did not mention the Confederate flag by name, so it effectively banned a host of other flags as well. Esper later stated, in defense of the memo, that his aim was to remove any real or perceived politics from the department. Esper was later criticized by the LGBTQ community for banning the display of all non-official flags because the Pride flag, like many other groups' flags, was no longer authorized for display. This policy was affirmed by the Biden administration in 2021.

=== Basic Exchange and Cooperation Agreement for Geo-Spatial Cooperation ===
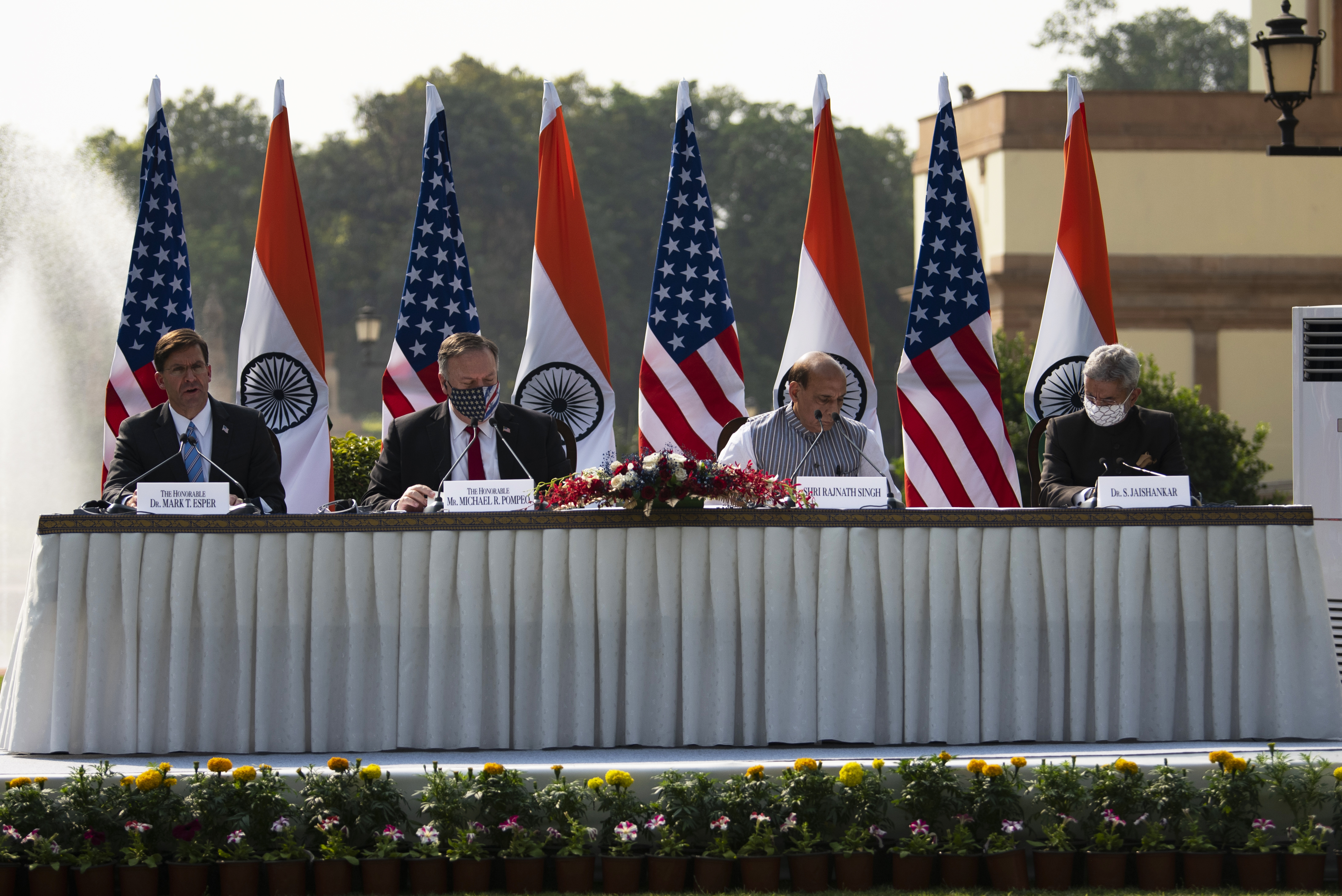
Defense Secretary Mark T. Esper speaks alongside Secretary of State Mike Pompeo, Indian defense minister Rajnath Singh, and Indian external affairs minister S. Jaishankar participate in a press event after the U.S.–India 2+2 Ministerial, New Delhi, India, Oct. 27, 2020.

In October 2020, Esper and U.S. Secretary of State Mike Pompeo met with Indian Minister of External Affairs Subrahmanyam Jaishankar and Minister of Defense Rajnath Singh to sign the Basic Exchange and Cooperation Agreement on Geospatial Cooperation (BECA), which facilitates the sharing of sensitive information and intelligence—including access to highly-accurate nautical, aeronautical, topographical, and geospatial data—between the United States and India. The agreement had been under discussion for over a decade, but previous concerns over information security impelled India's United Progressive Alliance (UPA) coalition government to block it.

=== Firing by Trump and subsequent events ===
After Trump lost the 2020 presidential election to Joe Biden, Trump launched a months-long effort to challenge the election outcome and remain in power, claiming that the election had been "stolen" from him. In his subsequent memoir, published in 2022, Esper wrote that Trump's effort "was a national embarrassment that undermined our democracy, our credibility, and our leadership on the world stage."

On November 9, 2020, days after his election loss, Trump tweeted that Esper was "terminated," and that he had been replaced by Christopher C. Miller, the director of the National Counterterrorism Center who would serve as Acting Secretary of Defense. Esper had written his resignation letter four days earlier, when a winner had not yet been determined.

On January 2, 2021, days before the end of Trump's term and the inauguration of Biden, Esper, along with all other living former secretaries of defense, published a Washington Post op-ed piece in January 2021 that rebuked Trump's effort to alter the election results, and said there was no role for the military to change them. The group's piece appeared days after Trump ally Michael Flynn, an ex-Army general, and reportedly Trump himself, discussed the possibility of declaring martial law and attempting to stay in power. The group wrote: "Our elections have occurred. Recounts and audits have been conducted. Appropriate challenges have been addressed by the courts. Governors have certified the results. And the electoral college has voted. The time for questioning the results has passed; the time for the formal counting of the electoral college votes, as prescribed in the Constitution and statute, has arrived." Esper later wrote that Trump's behavior on January 6, when a mob of his supporters, incited by the president, attacked the Capitol and disrupted the counting of the electoral votes, "threatens our democracy."

== After the administration ==
=== Memoirs, book tour, and Trump criticism ===
Esper sued the Department of Defense in November 2021, for preventing publication of parts of his memoir. The suit was dropped three months later, after DoD had withdrawn "the overwhelming majority" of objections to material initially deemed classified.

Published in May 2022, Esper's memoir A Sacred Oath describes the Trump administration's decision-making process being overtaken by concerns about the upcoming presidential election. He said he considered resigning several times but remained on, concerned he would be replaced by a Trump loyalist who would provide dangerous ideas to the president. Esper wrote that Trump asked him at least twice if the Pentagon could "shoot missiles into Mexico to destroy the drug labs" and "no one would know it was us." During the 2020 George Floyd protests, Trump sought to deploy 10,000 active duty troops in Washington, asking Esper about protestors, "Can't you just shoot them?" He wrote Trump's top domestic policy advisor Stephen Miller sought to send 250,000 troops to the southern border on the premise that a large caravan of migrants was en route; Esper wrote he responded the Pentagon did not "have 250,000 troops to send to the border for such nonsense." As White House officials watched a live video feed of the raid that killed Abu Bakr al-Baghdadi, Esper said Miller proposed beheading al-Baghdadi, dipping his head in pig's blood and parading it around to warn other terrorists. He said he told Miller that would be a war crime; Miller flatly denied the episode occurred. Esper characterized Trump as "an unprincipled person who, given his self-interest, should not be in the position of public service."

Esper gave several interviews in 2022 as part of his book tour. He described himself in TV interviews and in his memoir as a "Reagan Republican" who is a "fiscal conservative, social moderate, and defense hawk." In an interview on Fox & Friends, Esper said that Trump "went too far in too many things." He said he supported the 2021 impeachment of Trump, in which the president was impeached for inciting the January 6 attack on the Capitol, part of a failed bid to overturn Trump's election loss and keep him in power. In an interview on The Late Show with Stephen Colbert, Colbert pressed Esper on why he criticized Trump in his memoirs, but did not criticize Trump while still in office, or inform the public about what was going on. Esper defended himself as a "circuit breaker" against Trump's most dangerous and erratic tendencies.

In an open letter published in September 2022, Esper, along with Jim Mattis (who preceded him as defense secretary under Trump), as well as a bipartisan group of former top U.S. generals and former defense secretaries, said that the failure to commit to a peaceful transfer of power worsened "an extremely adverse environment" for the U.S. military. The 16-point letter did not mention Trump by name, but was a clear critique of Trump and his followers; the signatories wrote: "Military officers swear an oath to support and defend the Constitution, not an oath of fealty to an individual or to an office. It is the responsibility of senior military and civilian leaders to ensure that any order they receive from the president is legal."

In a December 2022 interview, Esper said he supported a merit-based immigration system. In 2023, after a high-altitude Chinese spy balloon was detected and shot down after transiting the U.S., U.S. officials disclosed that three suspected Chinese spy balloons had previously transited the continental United States during the Trump administration, with the intrusions only discovered sometime after Biden took office in January 2021. Esper said that, while in office, he was unaware of previous incidents of Chinese surveillance balloons in U.S. airspace. The Biden administration offered a briefing to top former Trump officials, including Esper, on the new intelligence.

== Other activities ==
In 2021, Esper was named the first John S. McCain Distinguished Fellow at the McCain Institute for International Leadership, a Washington, D.C.-based think tank; he is also a member of the institute's board of trustees.

Also in 2021, Esper joined the board of directors for the Atlantic Council, and was named co-chair (along with Deborah Lee James) of a commission tasked with making recommendations to the Pentagon reform on improving the Defense Department's ability "to rapidly absorb commercial technologies" from the private sector in order to enhance the U.S. military's warfighting capabilities. In December 2023, the Atlantic Council announced that Esper would be chairing a new commission on Software-Defined Warfare.

Esper joined the International Advisory Council of GLOBSEC, a European-based global think tank, in 2023.

In April 2022, the Washington-based venture capital firm Red Cell Partners announced that Esper had joined the firm as a Partner and chairman of its national security practice; he is also a member of Red Cell's board of directors.

Esper is a frequent guest on news shows such as CNN, CNBC, Fox News, and Bloomberg, and participates in the professional speaking circuit through the Harry Walker Agency and the Worldwide Speakers Group.

He is also a member of the Aspen Strategy Group, the U.S. Global Leadership Coalition, and the Council on Foreign Relations.

== Awards ==
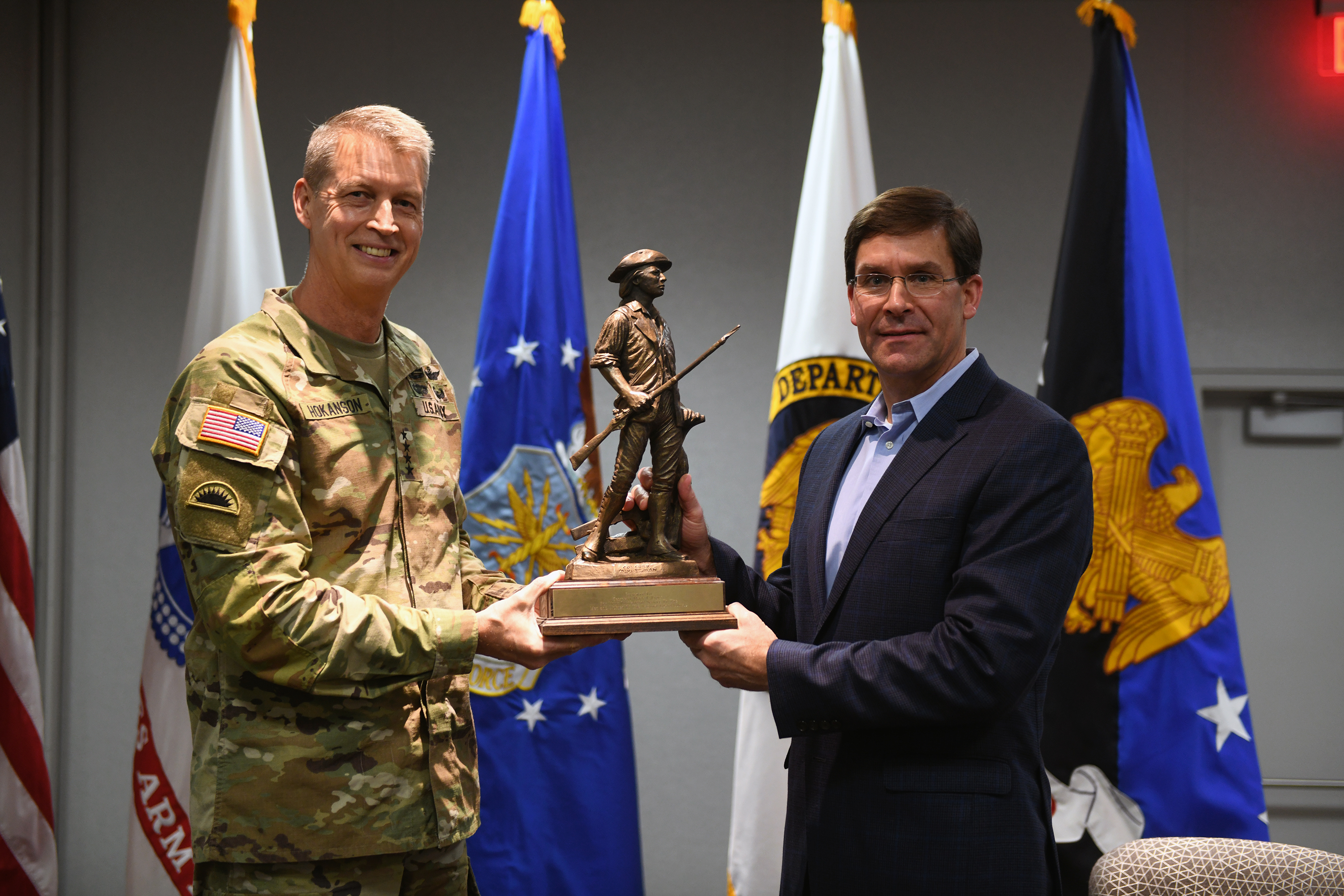
Army Gen. Daniel Hokanson, chief, National Guard Bureau, presents the Minuteman Award to former secretary of defense Mark Esper in recognition of his lifetime contributions to the National Guard. (U.S. Army National Guard photo by Sgt. 1st Class Jim Greenhill)

In 2018, The George Washington University presented Esper with its Distinguished Alumni Award for his service as Secretary of the Army.

Esper received the George C. Marshall Foundation's Andrew J. Goodpaster Award (2021) and the Reagan Presidential Foundation & Institute's "Peace Through Strength" Award (2022).

The President of Lithuania awarded Esper the Cross of Commander of the Order for Merits to Lithuania on March 22, 2023, in the capital, Vilnius.

On May 20, 2023, Esper received the Military Hero Award by the PenFed Foundation at its annual gala in Washington, D.C.

Taiwan Minister of National Defense Chiu Kuo-cheng presented Esper with the "Order of Resplendent Banner with Grand Cordon" on behalf of the Republic of China on August 23, 2023, in Taipei, for his support of Taiwan's security. On May 20, 2025, the West Point Association of Graduates presented Esper with its highest honor, the Distinguished Graduate Award. The DGA is given to graduates of the United States Military Academy "whose character, distinguished service, and stature draw wholesome comparison to the qualities for which West Point strives, in keeping with its motto: Duty, Honor, Country.". Esper is the first U.S. Military Academy graduate to serve as Secretary of Defense, and one of the few to serve as Secretary of the Army. A biographical video produced for Secretary Esper's award presentation can be found here.

== Personal life ==
Esper married Leah Lacy in 1989. They have three children.

== Books ==
- Esper, Mark (2022). A Sacred Oath: Memoirs of a Secretary of Defense During Extraordinary Times. New York: William Morrow. ISBN 9780063144316. OCLC 1286367288.

Political offices
Preceded by Ryan McCarthy; Acting	United States Secretary of the Army; 2017–2019	Succeeded by Ryan McCarthy
Preceded by Patrick M. Shanahan; Acting	United States Secretary of Defense; Acting; 2019	Succeeded by Richard V. Spencer; Acting
Preceded by Jim Mattis	United States Secretary of Defense; 2019–2020	Succeeded by Lloyd Austin
U.S. order of precedence (ceremonial)
Preceded by David Bernhardt as Former U.S. Cabinet Member	Order of precedence of the United States as Former U.S. Cabinet Member	Succeeded by Eugene Scalia as Former U.S. Cabinet Member
