= United States Under Secretary of the Navy =

Second-highest ranking civilian official in the U.S. Department of the Navy

- Seal of the Department of the Navy

- Flag of the under secretary of the navy

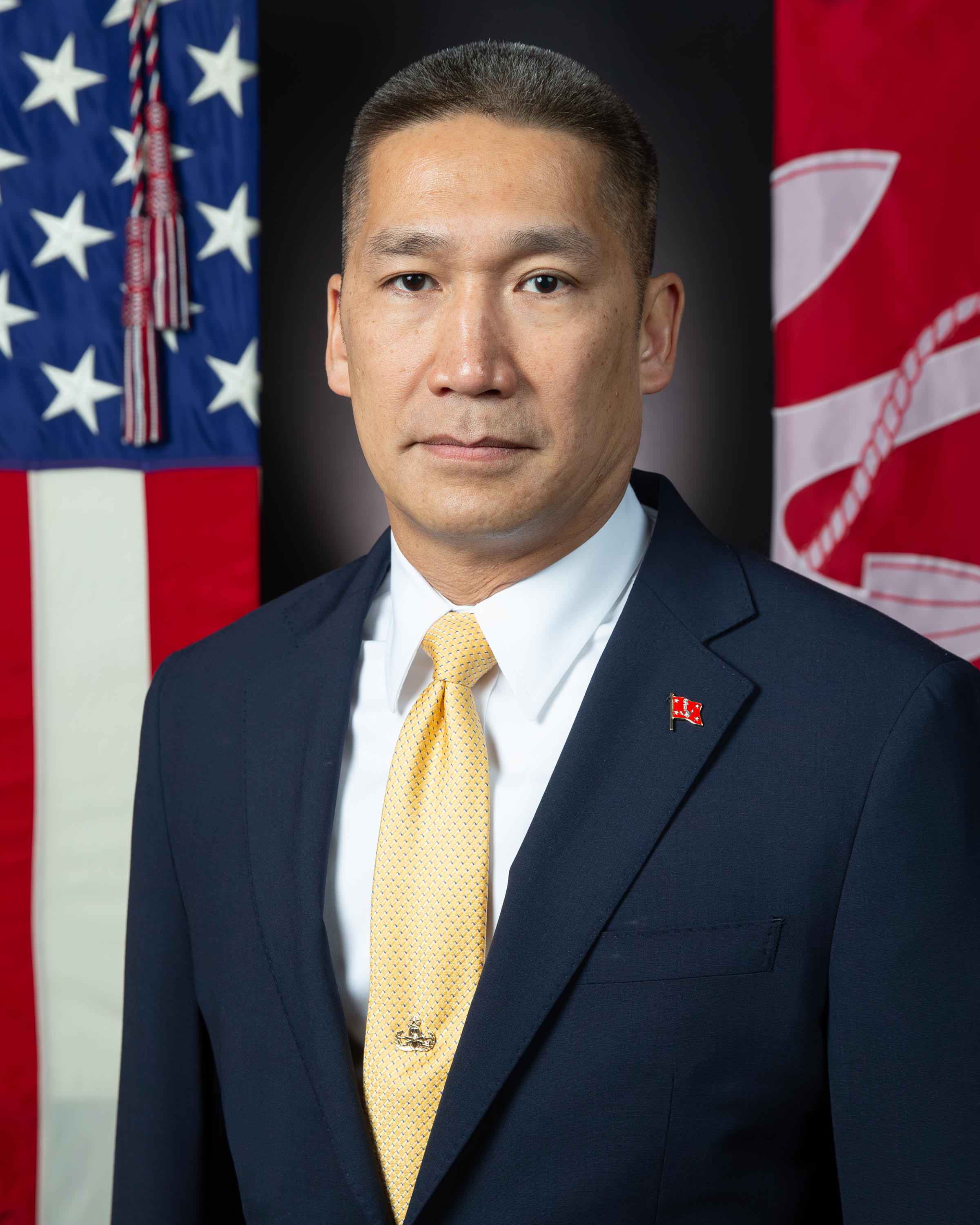
- Incumbent; Hung Cao since October 3, 2025
- Department of the Navy
- Style: Mr. Under Secretary; The Honorable (formal address in writing)
- Reports to: Secretary of the Navy
- Seat: The Pentagon, Arlington County, Virginia, United States
- Nominator: The president with Senate advice and consent
- Term length: No fixed term
- Constituting instrument: 10 U.S.C. § 8015
- Formation: August 22, 1940
- First holder: James Forrestal
- Succession: 17th in SecDef succession by seniority of appointment
- Deputy: Deputy Under Secretary of the Navy
- Salary: Executive Schedule, Level III
- Website: Official website

The under secretary of the Navy is the second-highest ranking civilian official in the United States Department of the Navy. The under secretary reports to the secretary of the navy (SECNAV). Before the creation of the under secretary's office, the second-highest civilian at the Department of the Navy was the assistant secretary of the navy.

== List of under secretaries of the navy, 1940–present ==
The following men and women have held the post:

No.	Portrait	Name	Assumed office	Left office	President appointed by	Secretary served under
1		James V. Forrestal	August 22, 1940	May 16, 1944	Franklin D. Roosevelt	Frank Knox
2		Ralph A. Bard	June 24, 1944	June 30, 1945	Franklin D. Roosevelt	James Forrestal
3		Artemus Gates	July 3, 1945	December 31, 1945	Harry S. Truman	James Forrestal
4		John L. Sullivan	June 17, 1946	September 18, 1947	Harry S. Truman	James Forrestal
5		W. John Kenney	September 19, 1947	September 24, 1949	Harry S. Truman	John L. Sullivan
6		Dan A. Kimball	May 25, 1949	July 31, 1951	Harry S. Truman	Francis P. Matthews
7		Francis P. Whitehair	August 7, 1951	January 29, 1953	Harry S. Truman	Dan A. Kimball
8		Charles S. Thomas	February 9, 1953	August 5, 1953	Dwight D. Eisenhower	Robert B. Anderson
9		Thomas S. Gates Jr.	October 7, 1953	April 1, 1957	Dwight D. Eisenhower	Robert B. Anderson; Charles Thomas
10		William B. Franke	April 17, 1957	June 7, 1959	Dwight D. Eisenhower	Thomas S. Gates Jr.
11		Fred A. Bantz	June 8, 1959	January 20, 1961	Dwight D. Eisenhower	William B. Franke
12		Paul B. Fay	February 16, 1961	January 15, 1965	John F. Kennedy	John Connally; Fred Korth; Paul Nitze
13		Kenneth E. BeLieu	February 26, 1965	July 1, 1965	Lyndon B. Johnson	Paul Nitze
14		Robert H. B. Baldwin	July 2, 1965	July 31, 1967	Lyndon B. Johnson	Paul Nitze
15		Charles F. Baird	August 1, 1967	January 20, 1969	Lyndon B. Johnson	Paul Robert Ignatius
16		John Warner	February 11, 1969	May 4, 1972	Richard Nixon	John Chafee
17		Frank P. Sanders	May 5, 1972	June 29, 1973	Richard Nixon	John Warner
18		J. William Middendorf	August 3, 1973	June 20, 1974	Richard Nixon	John Warner
19		David S. Potter	August 28, 1974	April 1, 1976	Gerald Ford	J. William Middendorf
20		David R. Macdonald	September 14, 1976	February 4, 1977	Gerald Ford	J. William Middendorf
21		R. James Woolsey Jr.	March 9, 1977	December 7, 1979	Jimmy Carter	W. Graham Claytor Jr.
22		Robert J. Murray	February 7, 1980	September 29, 1981	Jimmy Carter	Edward Hidalgo; John Lehman
23		James F. Goodrich	September 29, 1981	August 6, 1987	Ronald Reagan	John Lehman
24		Henry L. Garrett III	August 6, 1987	May 15, 1989	Ronald Reagan	Jim Webb; William L. Ball
25		J. Daniel Howard	August 7, 1989	January 20, 1993	George H. W. Bush	Henry L. Garrett III; Sean O'Keefe
26		Richard J. Danzig	November 29, 1993	May 30, 1997	Bill Clinton	John Howard Dalton
27		Jerry MacArthur Hultin	November 13, 1997	July 14, 2000	Bill Clinton	John Howard Dalton; Richard Danzig
28		Robert B. Pirie Jr.	October 12, 2000	June 6, 2001	Bill Clinton	Richard Danzig
29		Susan M. Livingstone	July 26, 2001	February 28, 2003	George W. Bush	Gordon R. England
30		Dionel M. Aviles	October 8, 2004	May 19, 2009	George W. Bush	Gordon R. England; Donald C. Winter
31		Robert O. Work	May 19, 2009	March 22, 2013	Barack Obama	Ray Mabus
–		Robert C. Martinage (acting)	March 22, 2013	January 15, 2014	Barack Obama	Ray Mabus
–		Thomas W. Hicks (acting)	January 15, 2014	March 17, 2016	Barack Obama	Ray Mabus
32		Janine A. Davidson	March 17, 2016	January 20, 2017	Barack Obama	Ray Mabus
–		Thomas W. Hicks (acting)	January 20, 2017	February 17, 2017	Donald Trump	Sean Stackley (acting)
–		Thomas P. Dee (acting)	February 17, 2017	December 4, 2017	Donald Trump	Richard V. Spencer
33		Thomas B. Modly	December 4, 2017	April 7, 2020; Serving as Acting Secretary of the Navy: November 24, 2019 – April 7, 2020	Donald Trump	Richard V. Spencer
–		Gregory J. Slavonic (acting)	April 24, 2020	January 20, 2021	Donald Trump	James E. McPherson (acting); Kenneth J. Braithwaite
–		James F. Geurts (acting)	February 4, 2021	August 24, 2021	Joe Biden	Thomas Harker (acting)
–		Meredith A. Berger (Performing the Duties of)	August 25, 2021	April 13, 2022	Joe Biden	Carlos Del Toro
34		Erik Raven	April 13, 2022	August 1, 2024	Joe Biden	Carlos Del Toro
–		Thomas Mancinelli (acting)	August 20, 2024	January 20, 2025	Joe Biden	Carlos Del Toro
–		Victor Minella (acting)	January 22, 2025	April 16, 2025	Donald Trump	Terence G. Emmert (acting); John Phelan
–		Brett A. Seidle (acting)	April 16, 2025	October 3, 2025	Donald Trump	John Phelan
35		Hung Cao	October 3, 2025	Incumbent	Donald Trump	John Phelan; Himself (acting)
–		William Toti (Performing the Duties of)	May 1, 2026	September 15, 2026	Donald Trump	Hung Cao (acting)
