= Stuart Baker =

Stuart Baker may refer to:

- E. C. Stuart Baker (1864–1944), British ornithologist and police officer
- Stuart Daniel Baker or Unknown Hinson (born 1954), American musician, comedian, and actor
- Stuart P. Baker, United States Navy officer
- Stuart Baker (Australian actor), portrayed "Richo" in the Australian TV series Blue Heelers

== See also ==
- Stewart Baker (born 1947), American attorney, federal government official, and author
