= Thomas W. Hicks =

American engineer and consultant

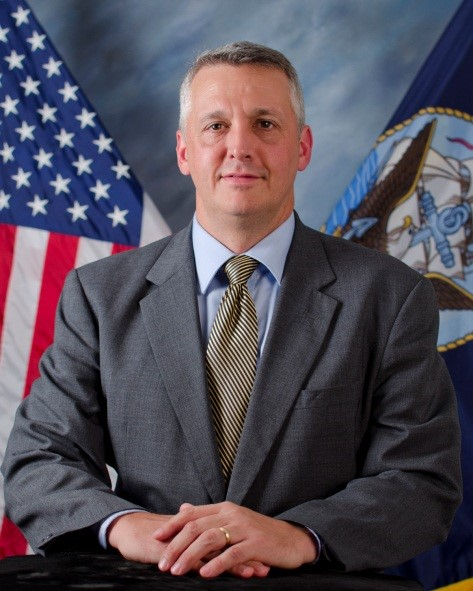
- Official portrait, 2017

Acting United States Under Secretary of the Navy
- In office January 20, 2017 – February 17, 2017
- President: Donald Trump
- Preceded by: Janine A. Davidson
- Succeeded by: Thomas P. Dee (acting)
- In office January 15, 2014 – March 17, 2016
- President: Barack Obama
- Preceded by: Robert C. Martinage (acting)
- Succeeded by: Janine A. Davidson

Personal details
- Spouse: Kathleen Hicks
- Children: 3
- Education: University of Maryland
- Occupation: Engineer, consultant, public servant

Thomas W. Hicks is an American engineer and consultant who served as the acting Under Secretary of the Navy from 2014 to 2016, and again in 2017. He previously served as the Deputy Under Secretary of the Navy for Management, and the Deputy Assistant Secretary of the Navy for Energy.

== Life ==
As Deputy Assistant Secretary of the Navy for Energy, Hicks led the department of the Navy's 1-gigawatt renewable energy initiative announced by President Obama, Obama Administration Announces Additional Steps to Increase Energy Security, Navy's Commitment to Renewable Energy Takes the Nation's Center Stage. In Jan 2012 state of the Union addressed: completed four years ahead of 2020 goal, the 1-gigawatt renewable energy initiative ultimately procured 1.2 GW at a net present value saving of over $400 million.

Led the creation of the Department of the Navy's $800 million public-private partnership designed to accelerate the capacity of the U.S. advanced alternative fuels industry to provide military-compatible, low-emission alternative fuel price-competitive with conventional fuel. Hicks received a Bachelor of Science in mechanical engineering from University of Maryland.

He was senior program manager with the U.S. Environmental Protection Agency’s Energy Star® program. Hicks co-created the Energy Star commercial building rating system, which enables measurements and tracking of building energy performance on a 1-to-100 scale.

Hicks was vice president of the Leadership in Energy and Environmental Design (LEED®) and International Programs with the U.S. Green Building Council. He led the expansion from four to seven individual ratings and increased presence of LEED to more than 120 countries.

Hicks was the Under Secretary of the Navy from 2014 to 2016 and again in January 2017, representing the Department of Defense on policy, budget, and strategy matters and serving as the chief operating officer/chief management officer of the Navy.

Hicks is one of the three founding principals of The Mabus Group, with Ray Mabus and Thomas Oppel. The Mabus Group is a strategic advisory firm specializing in resiliency which includes energy, sustainability, cyber security, and talent management.

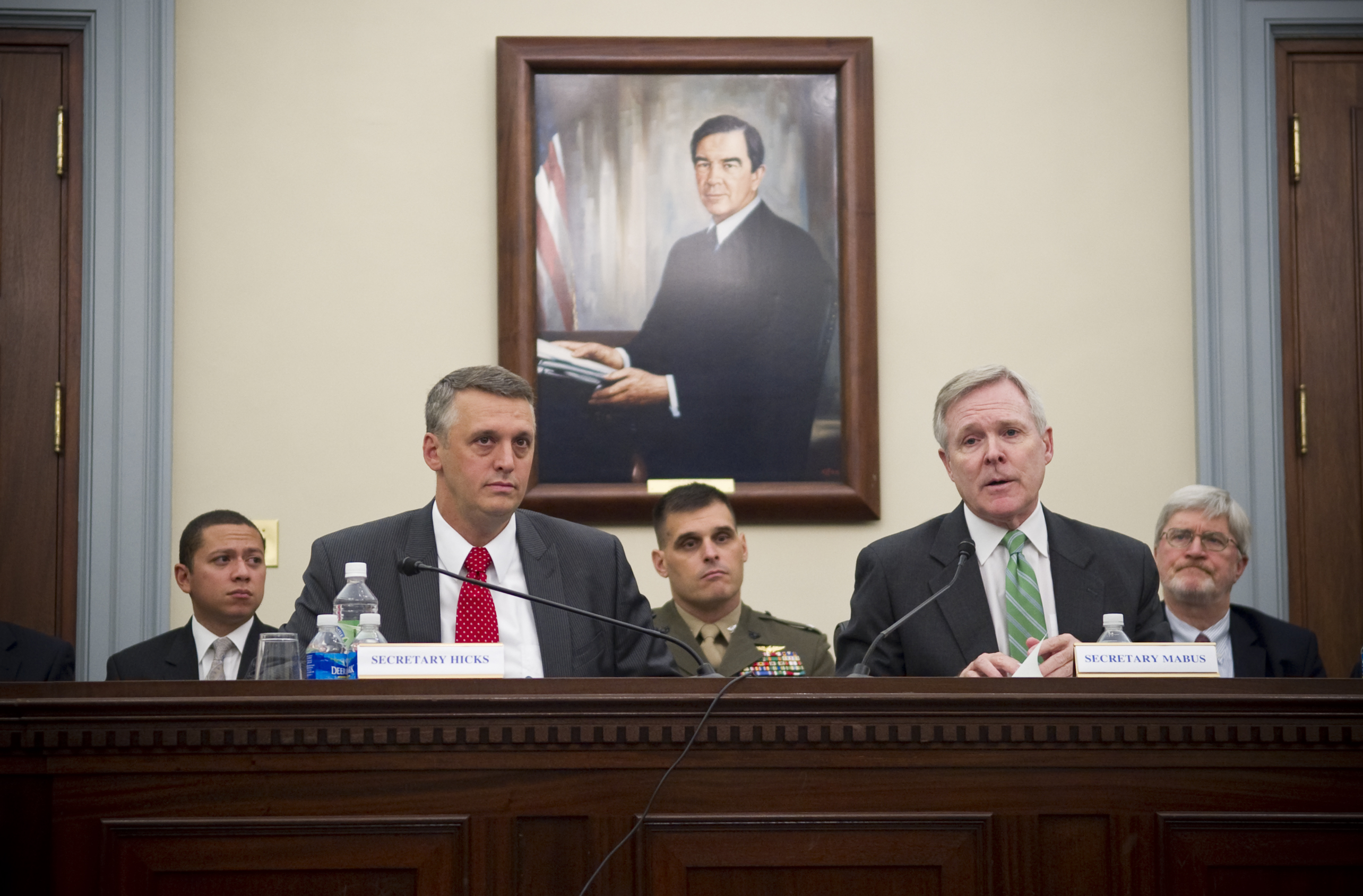
Secretary of the Navy (SECNAV) the Honorable Ray Mabus, right, and Deputy Assistant Secretary of the Navy (Energy) Thomas Hicks

Political offices
Preceded by Robert C. Martinage; Acting	United States Under Secretary of the Navy; Acting; 2014–2016	Succeeded by Janine A. Davidson
Preceded by Janine A. Davidson	United States Under Secretary of the Navy; Acting; 2017	Succeeded by Thomas P. Dee; Acting
