= Ray Mabus =

American politician (born 1948)

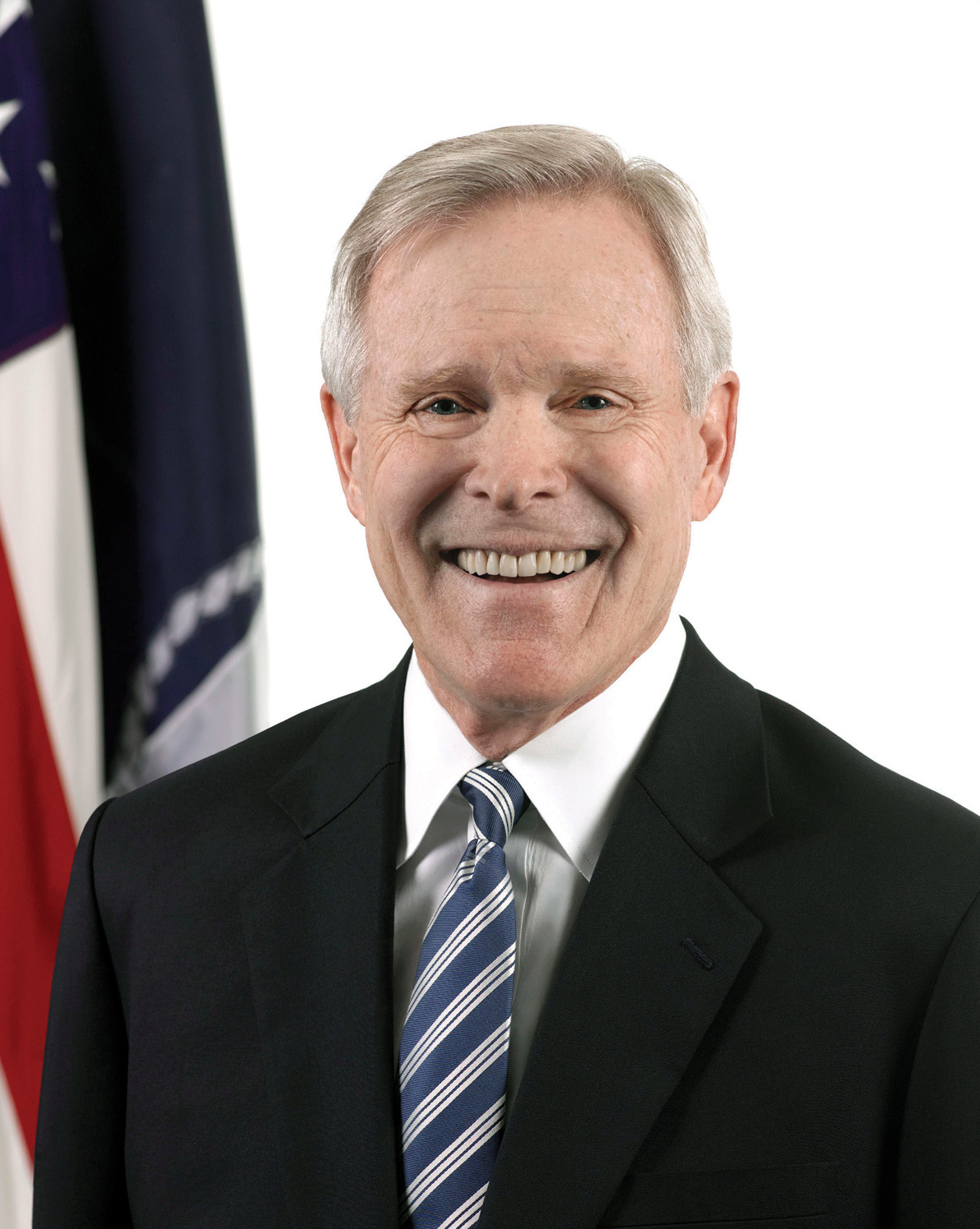
- Official portrait, 2014

75th United States Secretary of the Navy
- In office May 19, 2009 – January 20, 2017
- President: Barack Obama
- Deputy: Robert O. Work; Robert Martinage (acting); Thomas W. Hicks (acting); Janine A. Davidson
- Preceded by: B. J. Penn (acting)
- Succeeded by: Richard V. Spencer

United States Ambassador to Saudi Arabia
- In office July 5, 1994 – April 25, 1996
- President: Bill Clinton
- Preceded by: David Welch (acting)
- Succeeded by: Wyche Fowler

60th Governor of Mississippi
- In office January 12, 1988 – January 14, 1992
- Lieutenant: Brad Dye
- Preceded by: William Allain
- Succeeded by: Kirk Fordice

37th Auditor of Mississippi
- In office January 5, 1984 – January 7, 1988
- Governor: William Allain
- Preceded by: Hamp King
- Succeeded by: Pete Johnson

Personal details
- Born: Raymond Edwin Mabus Jr. October 11, 1948 (age 78) Ackerman, Mississippi, U.S.
- Party: Democratic
- Spouses: Julie Hines Mabus (m. 1987; div. 2000); Lynne Horecky (m. 2007)
- Children: 3
- Relatives: Brandon Presley (cousin-in-law)
- Education: University of Mississippi (BA); Johns Hopkins University (MA); Harvard University (JD)

Military service
- Allegiance: United States
- Branch/service: United States Navy
- Years of service: 1970–1972
- Rank: Lieutenant (junior grade)
- Mabus's voice Mabus testifying at the Senate Armed Services Committee on the FY2013 Navy and Marine Corps budget. Recorded March 15, 2012

Raymond Edwin Mabus Jr. (/meɪbəs/; born October 11, 1948) is an American politician and lawyer. A member of the Democratic Party, he served as the 75th United States secretary of the Navy from 2009 to 2017. Mabus previously served as the State Auditor of Mississippi from 1984 to 1988, as the 60th governor of Mississippi from 1988 to 1992, and as the United States ambassador to Saudi Arabia from 1994 to 1996.

== Early life and education ==
Mabus was born on October 11, 1948, in Ackerman, Mississippi. He was the only child of Raymond Mabus Sr. (1901–1986), a successful timber farmer, and Lucille (née Curtis) Mabus (1909–2000), a teacher. His paternal uncle, merchant Leslie E. Mabus (1896–1992), was a member of the Mississippi State Senate from 1932 to 1936.

Mabus graduated from Ackermann High School in 1966 as class valedictorian. He graduated summa cum laude from the University of Mississippi, where he was a member of Beta Theta Pi, with a Bachelor of Arts in English and political science. He earned a Master of Arts in political science from Johns Hopkins University and a Juris Doctor, magna cum laude, from Harvard Law School. He had been offered a Fulbright Scholarship, had held a Woodrow Wilson Fellowship, and had traveled widely throughout Europe, the Middle East, Russia, and Latin America. Prior to attending law school, he also served two years in the Navy as a surface warfare officer from 1970 to 1972 aboard the cruiser USS Little Rock (CLG-4), achieving the rank of lieutenant junior grade. He worked as a law clerk in the United States Court of Appeals for the Fifth Circuit and as a legal counsel to a subcommittee of the United States House Committee on Agriculture.

== Early political career ==
Mabus volunteered for William F. Winter's unsuccessful gubernatorial candidacy in 1967. Following Winter's successful election to the governorship in 1979, Mabus returned to Mississippi to work as the governor's legal counsel in 1980. While in office, Winter and his staff pushed through a legislative overhaul of the state's public education system. Mabus was one of several of the governor's aides who delivered lectures across the state to build popular support for the reform bill.

State senator Ellis B. Bodron, who was broadly opposed to the legislation, denounced Mabus and the other young Winter aides—including Dick Molpus, David Crews, Bill Gartin, Andy P. Mullins, and John Henegan—as the "Boys of Spring", a moniker which they thereafter took pride in. Mabus also helped draft an open records law and more stringent driving under the influence legislation. He left the counsel position in 1983.

== Mississippi State Auditor ==
=== Election ===
While working on Winter's staff in 1982, Mabus requested that the Department of Audit supply him with the latest three audit reports for Hinds County government. The department sent him three reports, with the latest dated 1977. Surprised, Mabus reminded the department that he wanted the three latest audits. The department informed him that 1977 was the last year in which an audit of the county was conducted, and that all audits were being conducted on a five-year-delay. Aspiring to run for elective office, Mabus researched the position of State Auditor. He realized the office had the power to investigate nearly all state and local government agencies, later saying, "I did a radical thing. I went and read the statute. That office had more jurisdiction than almost any in the state of Mississippi. It had never been used. It's the one place you can combat corruption without changing the law. It was sitting there, waiting for somebody like me to come along." Concluding that it could be "the most powerful office in the state", he decided to run for the position of State Auditor in the 1983 elections.

In the 1983 Democratic primary, Mabus faced Department of Audit employee Mason Shelby and former radio station owner Murray Cain. Shelby was viewed as the favorite of the outgoing state auditor, Hamp King, and other leaders in the department. Mabus and Cain criticized the department for which Shelby worked as outdated in its methods and a part of an old boy network. Mabus declared that the department was two to four years behind on most of its audits. King wrote an open letter to Mabus rejecting his claims as exaggerations and asked a legislative committee to conduct a review of the Department of Audit. Mabus ultimately won the election, and the legislative report was published in December. The committee identified several flaws with the department's structure and practices, and determined that it was delinquent for 581 fiscal years worth of audits.

=== Tenure ===
Mabus was sworn in as state auditor on January 5, 1984. At the time he took office, he found the audit department was disorganized; in addition to being behind on hundreds of years' worth of audits, it had no filing system and thousands of dollars' worth of checks for auditing services performed for local governments and other agencies were stored in a shoebox in the auditor's office. Mabus convinced the legislature to permit the department to contract out auditing services to private Certified Public Accountant firms to work on the backlog. Using these strategies, the office eliminated the backlog in two years. On July 1, 1985, his office adopted Generally Accepted Accounting Principles for financial reporting. His office also released a single comprehensive annual financial report for state government for the 1986 fiscal year instead of separate reports for each state agency, the first time this had been done in Mississippi. The consolidated report was well-received, and the legislature subsequently mandated the issuance of a comprehensive financial report by statute, though it transferred the responsibility for the document's publication to the Fiscal Management Board.

Mabus discovered early in his tenure that many department auditors conducting reviews of county government finances were forced to piece together county accounting records as they worked. Though the state charged $25 per day it took to work on a county audit, most counties found this preferable than paying to maintain their own accounting. Many auditors found that records were missing, which Mabus feared might conceal evidence of fraud. In order to improve county accounting practices, he created a new requirement that county governments maintain up-to-date accounting records, raised the cost of daily auditing services to $100, and appointed a head of an investigative division in the department. He had field auditors supplied with undercover tags so that their vehicles could not be traced during their investigations.

Mabus warned the Mississippi Association of Supervisors that he would enforce financing laws strictly and would disapprove of misuse of local government resources or noncompliance with purchasing practices. In order to ease compliance, he created a technical assistance division in the Department of Audit to provide legal and accounting advice to county boards of supervisors. He also met with each of the 82 county boards to advise them of relevant state laws and his expectations. To deal with complaints of misconduct, he created a departmental hotline to field public grievances. The hotline received numerous complaints from across the state, accusing county supervisors of various acts of malfeasance including misusing county resources for private purposes, signing contracts with companies despite conflicts of interest, gifting away government funds to charities, and extorting contractors. Mabus' office ultimately audited all 82 counties during his term, enabling five to have their bond ratings restored and leading to $1.7 million in misused funds being returned to the state. His actions infuriated many county supervisors.

Early in his term Mabus began collaborating with the Federal Bureau of Investigation on a corruption investigation into Mississippi county governments known as Operation Pretense. For the purposes of secrecy, initially only Mabus and his chief investigator in his department were aware of the scope of the federal investigation, until the first indictments against county officials were announced in February 1987. By the time Operation Pretense was finished, 57 public officials were indicted. The Department of Audit's contribution to the investigation was mostly limited to providing purchasing records for federal prosecutors to use as evidence of wrongdoing. Upon the public reveal of the investigation, Mabus appealed to the state legislature to switch counties from the beat system of government to the unit system, (Note: Under the beat system, each supervisor on a given board is responsible for managing road construction in their assigned district, or beat. Under the unit system, road construction considerations are handled in a centralized manner by the entire board of supervisors and a county administrator and road manager.) mandate the hiring of professional county administrators, and strengthen county record-keeping standards. He also advised restricting federally-convicted criminals from holding public office, barring convicted vendors from securing government contracts, and creating a white collar crimes unit in the office of the Attorney General of Mississippi. He was succeeded as State Auditor by Pete Johnson on January 7, 1988.

== Governor of Mississippi ==
=== 1987 election ===
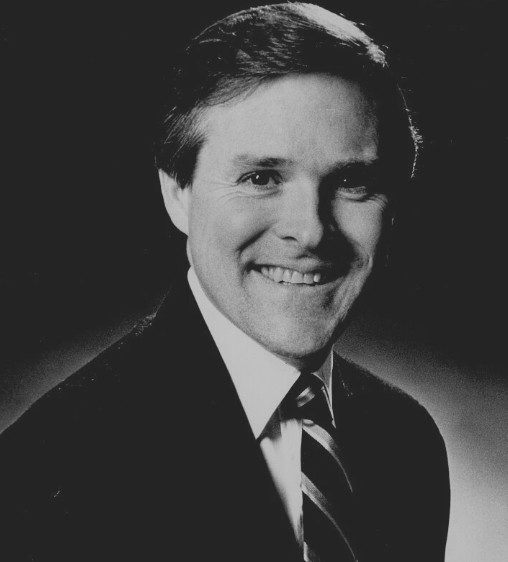
Mabus as governor.

Mabus began planning a gubernatorial bid in 1985 and formally declared his candidacy four days after Operation Pretense was revealed to the public in 1987. Incumbent William Allain did not seek reelection. In the Democratic primary he faced seven other candidates, including former governor Bill Waller, Attorney General Ed Pittman, Maurice Dantin, John Arthur Eaves, and Mike Sturvidant. Mabus had an advantage in being from northeast Mississippi, which usually heavily participated in Democratic primaries. He also enjoyed the good faith of many journalists for cracking down on corruption. Some warned that county supervisors would organize against him as retaliation for his work as auditor, but these fears proved unfounded. (Note: One undercover FBI agent, Jerry King, later stated that many supervisors were satisfied with Mabus' gubernatorial candidacy, noting that it would lead to his departure from the auditor's office.) Mabus led in the August 4 primary with 37 percent of the vote, while Sturvidant—who spent heavily on his campaign—placed second with 16 percent. A runoff was held on August 25 in which Mabus took 65 percent of the vote, the largest-ever margin of victory in a runoff in the state's history.

In the 1987 general election Mabus faced Republican Jack Reed. A businessman from Tupelo, Reed had worked with Winter on education reform and ran as a moderate, leaving voters with the impression that the two candidates had little to distinguish one from the other. Mabus ran with the slogan "Mississippi will never be last again," and while his campaign did not articulate many specific stances, it emphasized a theme of change. He pledged to raise the state's teacher salaries to the Southeastern average, which Reed criticized as necessitating either a tax hike or funding cuts to other government responsibilities. Mabus spent a total of $2.9 million on his campaign, the most ever spent on a Mississippi gubernatorial candidacy. He won with 53.4 percent of the vote, relying on a coalition of support from blacks, urbanites, and traditional Democrats from the northeastern portion of the state. About two-thirds of the white electorate voted against him, but he secured almost 90 percent of the black vote. Mabus was inaugurated as the 60th Governor of Mississippi on January 12, 1988. Aged 39, he was the youngest governor in the country.

=== Executive action and appointments ===
Mabus staffed his gubernatorial administration with a significant number of political moderates from outside the state. He appointed the first black members to the State Tax Commission and the first woman head of the Department of Public Safety. Mabus had potential judicial appointments vetted by a commission before making a selection among their nominees.

=== Legislative action ===
==== County reform ====
At the beginning of his term, Mabus enjoyed the cooperation of legislators and an $85 million budget surplus. In 1988 he proposed a bill to the legislature which would require counties to switch from the beat system to the unit system and hire a professional county administrator to handle financial matters and purchasing. The State Senate passed a bill which mandated a transition by all counties to switch to a loose form of the unit system, while the House of Representatives endorsed legislation which would allow counties to switch to a full unit system following a local referendum. A conference committee was unable to reconcile the two different proposals before they expired on the legislative calendar. The legislature successfully passed a bill raising supervisor's salaries, which Mabus vetoed on April 30. In early June he declared that he would call the legislature into special session to consider the unit system legislation, and the session was eventually scheduled for August 10. Addressing the legislature in joint session, Mabus denounced the beat system as an antiquated form of government which "made stealing too easy and too tempting" and created inefficiency. On August 16, the legislature passed the County Government Reorganization Act, which stipulated that counties were to decide on what form of government to use in a November referendum, and further stipulated requirements for implementation of the unit system. Mabus signed the bill into law. County supervisors began drawing up cost estimates of implementing the unit system, with estimates from 47 different counties varying from $500 to $1.48 million. Mabus and other observers denounced the estimates as exaggerated and criticized them for not incorporating cost-savings projections post-transition. In November, 46 of the 82 counties voted to adopt the unit system, with 61 percent of voters backing the switch. Mabus established the Governor's County Unit Task Force in January 1991 to examine the progress of the unit transition and recommend improvements. None of its findings were used due to the end of Mabus' term.

==== State fiscal reform and budgetary issues ====
During the 1988 session, Mabus vetoed a bill which would have forced the Fiscal Management Board—which he chaired as governor—to uniformly reduce expenditures if a projected revenue shortfall became apparent. He also convinced the legislature to appropriate the projected revenue surplus towards increasing schoolteacher salaries, and successfully lobbied the body to adopt several government reorganization recommendations, including the creation of a Department of Finance and Administration, which replaced the Fiscal Management Board and assumed its responsibilities for making budget recommendations and fiscal adjustments. The reorganization also led to the abolition of the State Eleemosynary Board and charitable hospitals, with the latter's funds subsequently diverted to the state Medicaid program. Mabus was disappointed that the legislature did not adopt the majority of his proposals—which would have greatly reduced the number of state boards and commissions—but claimed that those enacted saved the state at least $928,744 annually. In the 1989 session he proposed the legislature authorize the issuance of general obligation bonds to fund a five-year capital improvement plan and thereby free up general revenue for other services. The bond proposal expired due to disagreement between the Senate and House, so Mabus called the legislature into special session to address the issue. The legislature authorized the issuance of $78.1 million in bonds for the 1990 fiscal year, and in the 1990 session authorized the issuance of an additional $69.5 million in bonds. Facing a $120 million budget shortfall in early 1991, Mabus imposed large cuts to state expenditures as required by law.

==== B.E.S.T. ====
Mabus decided to focus on improving public education during the 1990 legislative session. By the time the legislature had convened in January, the governor had circulated his education plan across the state. The platform—Better Education for Success Tomorrow or B.E.S.T.—included new adult and family literacy programs, a program to ameliorate the high school dropout rate, the creation of health clinics in schools, a plan to monitor schools with subpar performance and financially reward and reduce restrictions on schools with excellent performance, and the establishment of a new school construction and facility repair fund. In funding his proposals, Mabus eschewed sales or income tax increases, arguing that "the working people of Mississippi pay enough taxes", and argued for the establishment of a state lottery. The state constitution banned lotteries, and could only be amended by public referendum following the approval of two-thirds of the legislature. The Senate refused to approve a referendum, but the legislature passed most of B.E.S.T. with the added provision that the program would expire on June 30 if no funding was ultimately found for it.

On June 18, Mabus called the legislature into special session to consider various plans for funding B.E.S.T.. He suggested several options for the body to consider including the lottery, gambling taxes, or higher government service fees, but refused to consider tax increases, arguing that the state had overused that option for previous education improvements. The legislature ultimately adjourned without approving a funding plan. Mabus continued to lobby for the financing of B.E.S.T. for another year without success. As time went on, many legislators began to feel Mabus was arrogant and did not want to be an equal partner in creating public policy for the state. Focus groups convened by Mabus' campaign organization in the aftermath of the special session largely interpreted the governor's failure as a result of his unwillingness to compromise with the legislature.

He gave teachers the largest pay raise in the nation; and was named one of Fortune Magazine's ten "best education governors".

=== Political affairs ===
In January 1988, Mabus indicated that he wanted to replace the chairman of the Mississippi Democratic Party, Ed Cole, the first black man to hold the position. The move rankled many black Democrats in the state. Some of Cole's supporters accused Mabus of racism, but most criticized him for attempting to effect a personal takeover of the party. Mabus and his allies attempted to cast Cole as an "old guard" moderate of an ineffective organization while portraying his desired candidate, Billie Thompson, as an effective reformer and fundraiser. On April 9, the party's executive committee voted to reelect Cole as chairman. In his victory speech, Cole declared, "I want [Mabus] to know that he belongs to our party and our party does not belong to him."

=== 1991 election ===
Enabled by a gubernatorial succession amendment ratified in 1986, Mabus became the first Mississippi governor to run for reelection in the 20th century. In the 1991 Democratic primary he faced former U.S. Congressman Wayne Dowdy, who ran with the slogan "Save us from Mabus", and George Blair. Styling himself a populist, Dowdy ran an old-style campaign and attempted to portray Mabus as arrogant, calling him "the ruler". He also mocked Mabus' 1987 slogan by saying that if elected "Mississippi would never be lost again". Mabus denounced his opponent as part of the "old guard" of Mississippi politicians and criticized his attendance record in the U.S. Congress. Equipped with more financial resources, Mabus' spent five times the amount of Dowdy and won in the primary with 50.7 percent of the vote.

In the general election Mabus faced Republican Kirk Fordice, a former Vicksburg construction executive. Fordice had not been expected by most observers to win his own primary and thus entered the general election with momentum, while Mabus had been harmed by his narrow victory in the Democratic contest. Mabus' campaign focused on attempting to make Fordice unappealing, while Fordice's campaign concentrated their efforts on turning the election into a referendum on Mabus' performance.

Fordice declared his support for legislative term limits and welfare reform. He labeled Mabus a "Kennedyesque liberal" who focused too much on education and criticized his deficit spending. Republican-hosted focus groups found the governor to be "aloof" and unconcerned with the necessities of "average" Mississippians and Fordice's signature campaign television ad attacked the incumbent for having "tried" but "not accomplished much". Mabus continued to advocate support for public education and attack Fordice as a lobbyist and outsider who did not appreciate the needs of the state. Later in the campaign, race became an issue, as Fordice declared his support for workfare and ending racial quotas. Mabus aired a series of television ads which accused Fordice of planning to shut down the state's historically black schools.

The governor spent twice as much as his opponent and held an edge in polls up to the election, but many potential voters identified themselves as undecided. On November 5, Fordice won with 50.8 percent to Mabus' 47.6 percent, the first Republican victory in a Mississippi gubernatorial race since 1874. Having received six percent less of the total vote share than in 1987, several observers blamed Mabus' loss on perception that he was an arrogant leader. Turnout among black voters was also lower in 1991, and some national Democrats accused Fordice of using race-baiting tactics. Mabus was succeeded by Fordice on January 14, 1992.

== Ambassador to Saudi Arabia and aftermath ==
Mabus was appointed by President Bill Clinton to be the United States Ambassador to Saudi Arabia. Confirmed by the U.S. Senate on July 1, 1994, he served until 1996, when he resigned to return to Mississippi to work for his family's lumber business. During his tenure five Americans were killed in a bombing at a military training installation in Riyadh. Before he departed, the Saudi Arabian government inducted him into the Order of King Abdulaziz.

After his return to Mississippi, Mabus practiced law. In 2000 he took an executive position at Foamex International. He served as the company's CEO during a bankruptcy reorganization and resigned from the post in 2007 and returned to Mississippi.

== Secretary of the Navy ==
=== Appointment ===
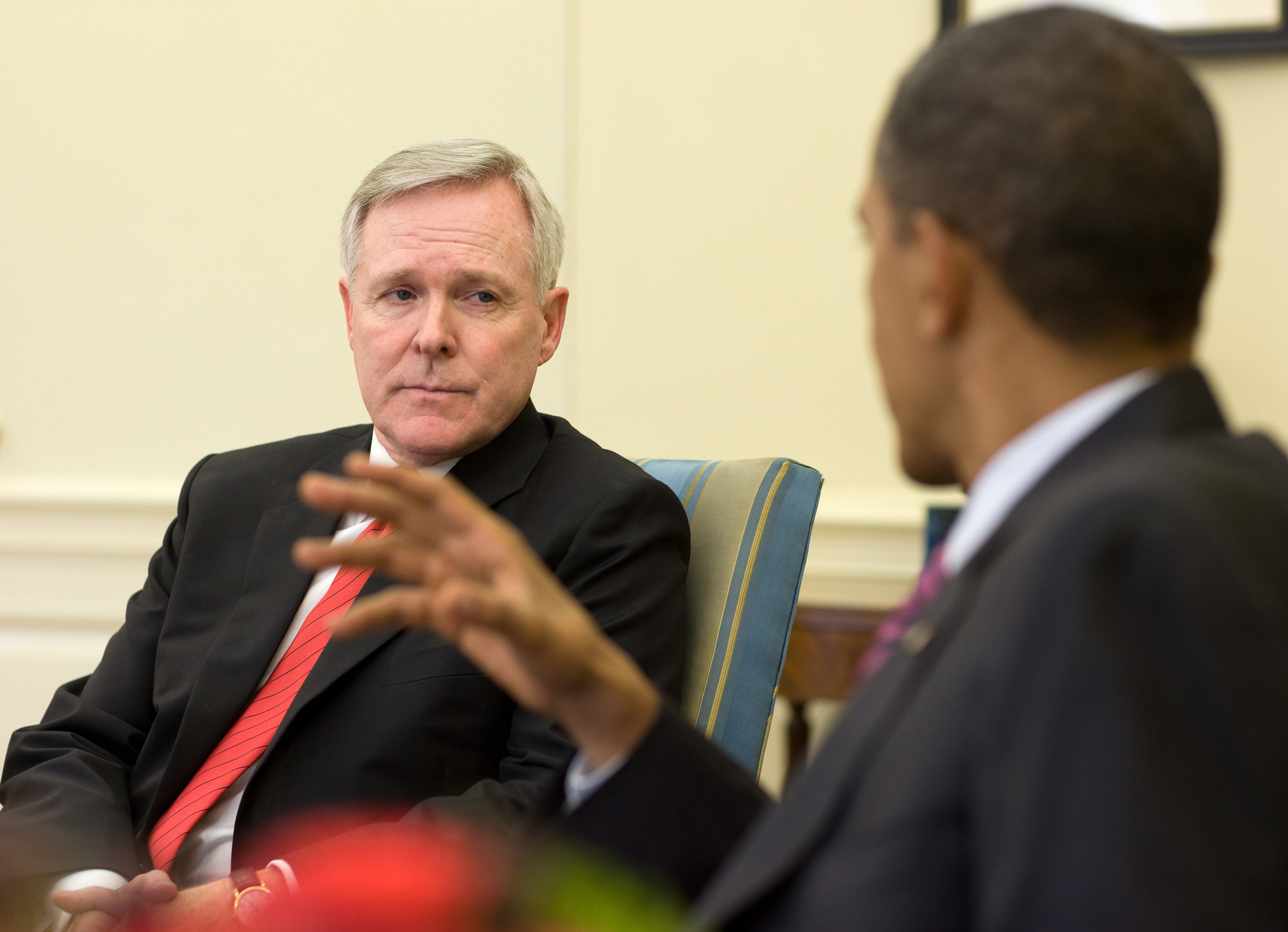
Mabus meeting with President Obama in the Oval Office in June 2010.

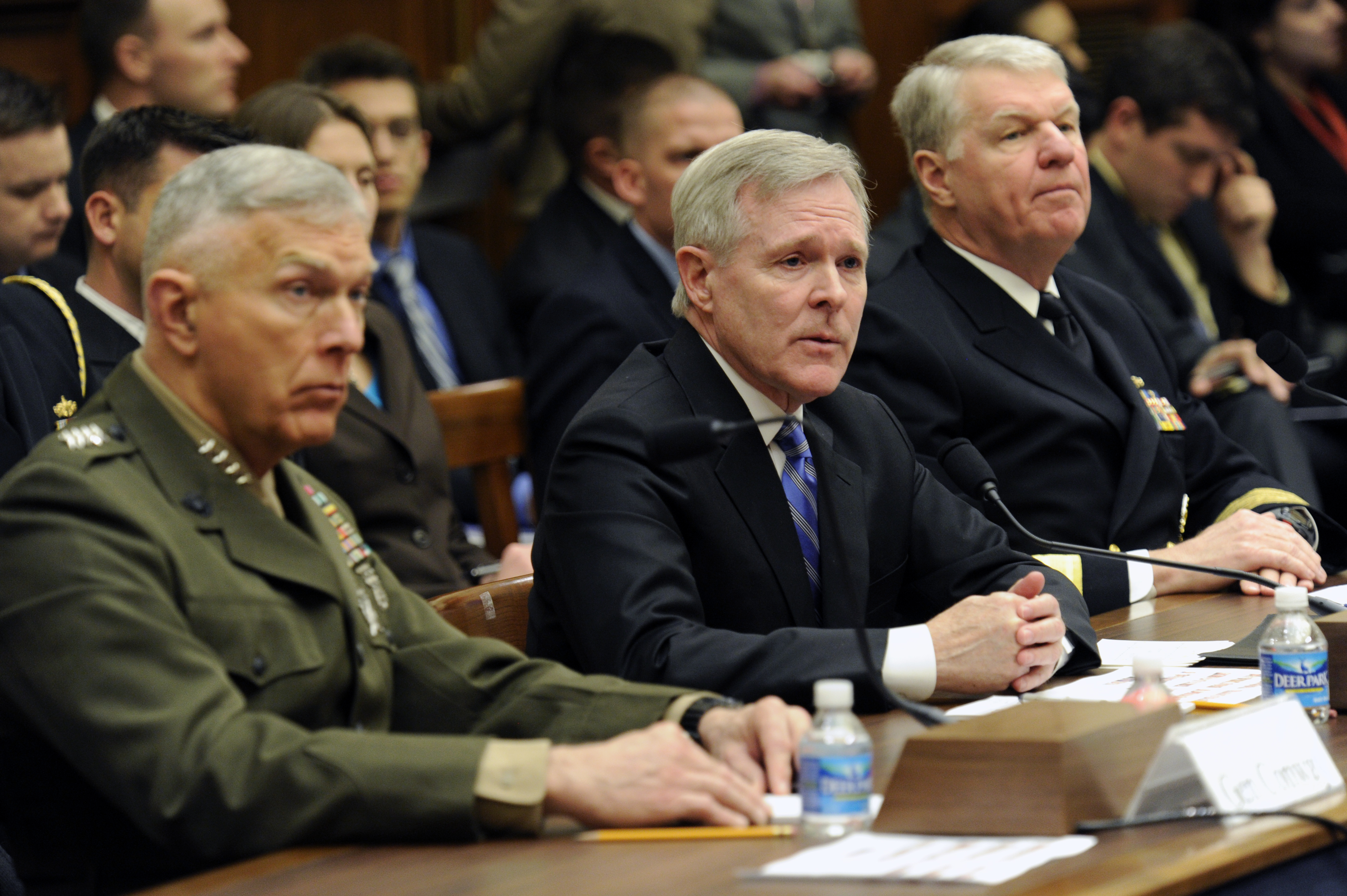
Gen. James T. Conway, Sec. Mabus, and Adm. Gary Roughead testify before Congress in February 2010.

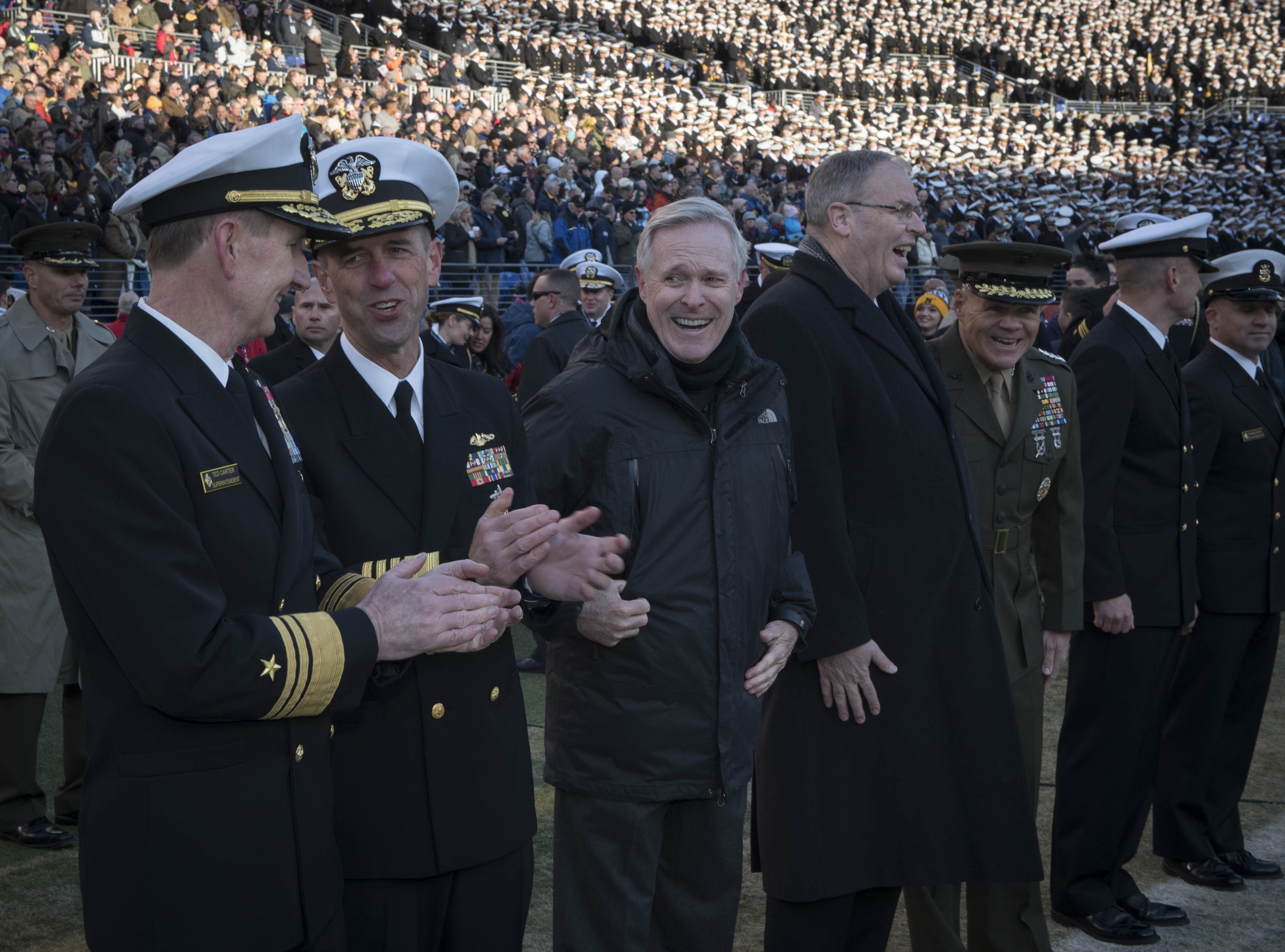
Vice Adm. Walter E. Carter Jr., Adm. John M. Richardson, Sec. Mabus, Deputy Sec. of Defense Robert O. Work, and Gen. Robert Neller at the 117th Army–Navy Game in December 2016.

In 2008 Mabus campaigned for Democratic presidential candidate Barack Obama in Mississippi, who was subsequently elected President of the United States. On March 27, 2009, Mabus was nominated by Obama to be appointed Secretary of the Navy. He was sworn in on May 19, 2009, and held a ceremonial swearing in at Washington Navy Yard on June 18, 2009, where he was re-sworn in by the Secretary of Defense Robert Gates.

=== Great Green Fleet ===
Several months after taking office, Mabus declared that he wanted to originate half of all of the Navy's power needs from non-petroleum sources by 2020. As part of this, he declared that a number of ships would be covered under a "Great Green Fleet" initiative in which half of them would be partly powered by sources other than fossil fuels. He argued that using alternative energy sources would reduce the force's reliance on foreign oil imports and thereby increase its energy independence. The Navy experimented with biofuels during his tenure, though their high expense often garnered skepticism, including when Senator John McCain noted that one report of a 2012 exercise showed that a half biodiesel fuel blend cost the Navy $26.75 per gallon instead of the usual $3.25 per gallon. As a result, Congress required all major purchases of alternative fuels to be conducted at competitive prices. In 2016 the Navy introduced a beef-fat fuel blend that cost $2.05 per gallon. Later in his tenure the destroyer USS Mason successfully operated on a biofuel blend that cost only $1.99 per gallon, a fact which Mabus claimed was overlooked.

=== Ship naming controversies ===
As Navy secretary, Mabus was given the responsibility of naming the force's ships. In April 2010 a furor arose when it was reported that Mabus made the proposal to name a United States Navy warship the USS John P. Murtha (LPD-26) after the late Pennsylvania Democratic congressman John Murtha. Additional naming controversies occurred due to the naming of the auxiliary ship USNS Cesar Chavez (T-AKE-14) after civil rights activist Cesar Chavez and a littoral combat ship the USS Gabrielle Giffords (LCS-10) in honor of former Arizona Democratic Congresswoman Gabby Giffords, after she suffered life-threatening wounds in the 2011 mass shooting in her home district of Tucson, Arizona.

Subsequent ship namings include his January 6, 2016, announcement of his naming of another auxiliary ship after civil rights activist and sitting incumbent Georgia Democratic Congressman John Lewis (i.e., USNS John Lewis (T-AO-205)). Mabus further stated that this particular class of auxiliary ship, of which the John Lewis would be the lead ship, would all be named after civil rights leaders. In April he announced his plans to name a destroyer after former Senate Armed Services Committee chairman Carl Levin. Congressional Republicans accused Mabus of politicizing the ship-naming process, and Representative Steven Palazzo unsuccessfully attempted to amend a defense appropriation bill to bar the secretary from naming ships after congressmen who were not military service members. On July 14, 2016, Mabus named ship T-AO-206 after gay rights icon and San Francisco Democratic politician Harvey Milk. The ship was renamed in 2025, as part of the Trump administration's rollback of DEI policies and programs.

=== Gulf Coast recovery ===
In June 2010, Obama ordered Mabus to draft a long-term plan to restore the condition of the Gulf Coast in the aftermath of the Deepwater Horizon oil spill. Some regional businessmen and environmentalists were critical of the assignment, being troubled by Mabus' previous investments in energy trading companies and worried that as the secretary of navy, he would not be able to devote his full attention to the cleanup effort. He introduced a recovery plan in September which received bipartisan support in Congress. Based on his recommendations, Congress subsequently passed the RESTORE Act, allocating over $5 billion to rehabilitate the coast.

=== Budget disputes ===
After a January 2015 report by the Defense Business Board and McKinsey & Company discovered the U.S. Department of Defense was spending $134 billion—23% of its total budget—on back-office work, and that the back-office bureaucracy staff of over one million people was nearly as great as the number of active troops, the board recommended a plan to cut $125 billion in waste over five years. However, when Ash Carter became defense secretary the next month, he replaced the board chairman, the McKinsey results were classified as secret, and its report was removed from public websites. Mabus then gave a speech at the American Enterprise Institute highlighting the McKinsey report, calling the back-office costs "pure overhead" and particularly criticizing the Defense Finance and Accounting Service and the Defense Logistics Agency. Under Secretary of Defense for Acquisition, Technology and Logistics Frank Kendall III then wrote to him asking "please refrain from taking any more public pot shots [...] I do not want this spilling over into further public discourse."

Throughout his tenure, Mabus contracted the building of 86 ships for the navy. In 2016 he drafted a budget for the navy for the 2018 fiscal year, which included billions of dollars earmarked for building dozens of additional ships. Carter's draft budget for the Department of Defense did not reflect this appropriation, and in December 2016 Mabus released a memo stating that he did not wish to cut money from shipbuilding, citing the decline in the size of the navy from 2001 to 2008. He also told Carter that "you and I both know that this budget is almost totally a symbolic one," making note of the impending end of Obama's tenure.

=== Personnel affairs ===
Mabus stated that he placed emphasis on "developing a more diverse force" during his tenure. Some personnel accused him of promoting "social engineering" policies. The United States Armed Forces' "don't ask, don't tell" policy towards gay servicemen ended in 2011. Two years later the Navy introduced randomized breathalyzer tests for on-duty sailors to curb alcohol abuse. Mabus created new Reserve Officers' Training Corps programs at different universities, including Harvard University and Arizona State University. He also removed zone distinctions from promotion considerations, allowing personnel to be considered equally for rank promotions without regard towards their specializations. At his direction the Navy introduced expanded graduate school-level education offerings and created a program to offer excelling junior officers to work for three years at Fortune 500 companies. He arranged for women to enter the submarine fleet in 2011. Mabus also pushed for the introduction of unisex uniforms in the Navy and the United States Marine Corps. In July 2015 he expanded the maternity leave of Navy Department personnel to 18 weeks, though Carter later trimmed this to 12 weeks across all armed forced in January 2016.

In late 2015 the Marine Corps released the results of a nine-month-long study on female performance in the corps, concluding that the average woman recruit was injured twice as often men, less accurate with infantry weapons, and not as effective at recovering wounded troops from the battlefield. Mabus immediately dismissed the findings, saying the Marine Corps failed to describe the effectiveness of the highest-performing women and did not provide sufficient reason to continue to exclude women from the most demanding roles in the corps. Following an instruction from Defense Secretary Carter, on January 1, 2016, Mabus ordered the Marine Corps to draft a plan to make all of its training co-ed within 15 days and directed the service to make all job-titles gender neutral. He subsequently met with Marine Commandant General Robert B. Neller and agreed to leave boot camp segregated by gender. His actions provoked the ire of members of Congress, with Representative Duncan D. Hunter demanding his resignation and others criticizing the narrow timeframe he had given the corps.

=== Departure ===
Mabus declared in March 2016 that he would consider retirement and stepped down as Secretary of the Navy on January 20, 2017, upon the inauguration of President Donald Trump. He was succeeded by Assistant Navy Secretary Sean Stackley, who became acting secretary pending the confirmation of a new permanent secretary. Mabus was one of only a few national security officials to serve continuously during Obama's entire tenure and the longest-serving secretary of the navy since Josephus Daniels, who served from 1913 to 1921. He declared, "For me, leading the Department of the Navy is the greatest honor of my life."

== Awards, honors, community service ==
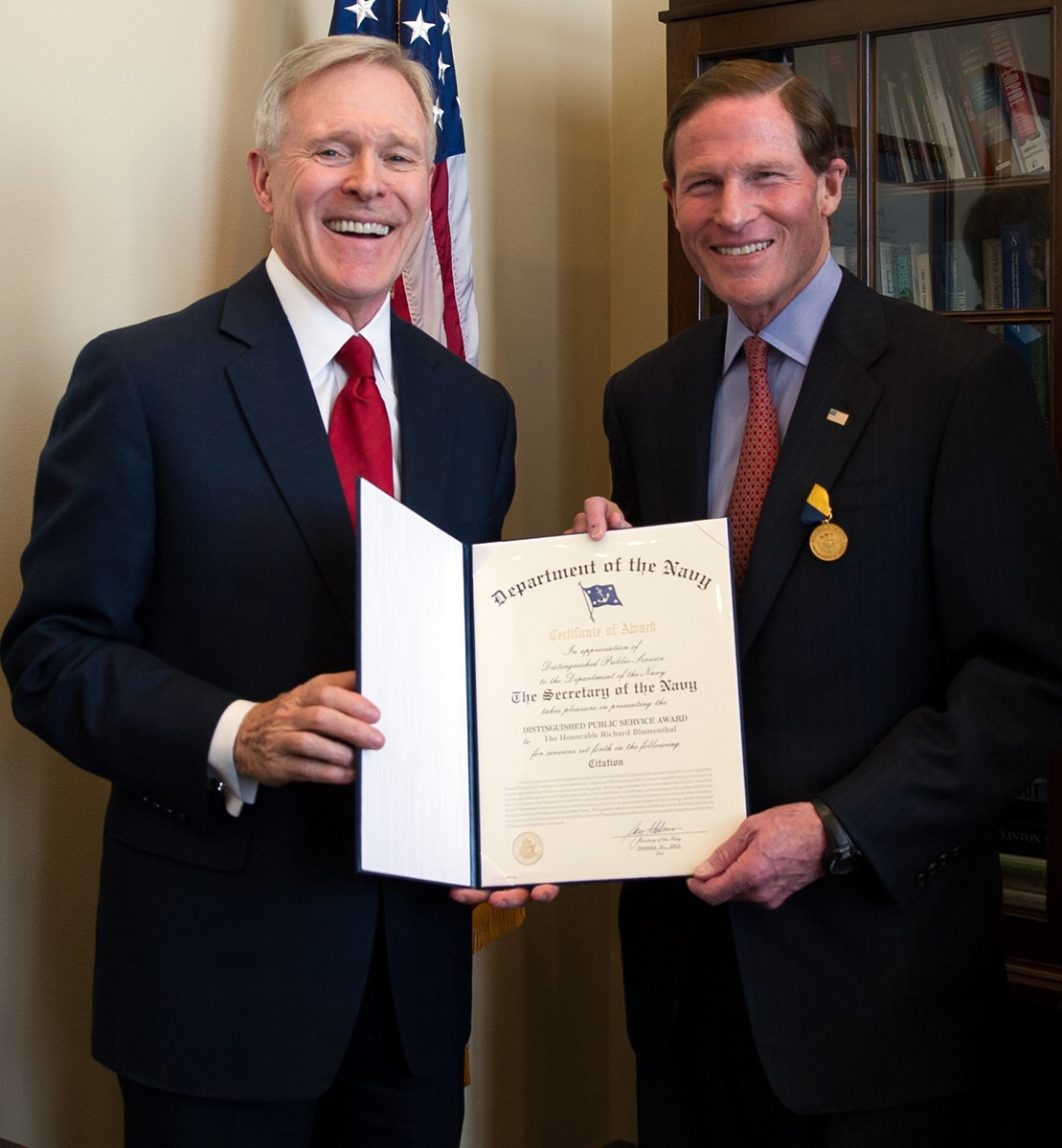
Secretary of the Navy Ray Mabus presents the Navy Distinguished Public Service Medal to U.S. Senator Richard Blumenthal (D-CT)

Mabus has been awarded the U.S. Department of Defense Distinguished Public Service Award, the U.S. Army's Distinguished Civilian Service Award, the Martin Luther King Jr. Social Responsibility Award from the King Center for Nonviolent Social Change in Atlanta, the National Wildlife Federation Conservation Achievement Award, the King Abdulaziz Award from the Kingdom of Saudi Arabia, and the Mississippi Association of Educators' Friend of Education Award.

He was included in Glassdoor's 2013 list of "Highest Rated CEOs" at 43rd place with an 82% approval rate. In 2017 the Mississippi Center for Justice accorded Mabus its Champion of Justice award. In 2019 the town of Ackermann erected historic markers honoring both Mabus and fellow town native former governor J. P. Coleman at Governor's Park.

He is active in many community activities, primarily focusing on education. Following Hurricane Katrina, he founded the Help and Hope Foundation, which works to meet the needs of children affected by the storm.

== Personal life ==
Mabus married Julie Hines, the daughter of a Jackson banker, in 1987, shortly before he ran for governor. Some observers speculated that the marriage was meant to improve his image before the campaign. They had two daughters together. They divorced in 2000, with the separation proceedings and the following custody dispute over their children marked by bitterness. A Hinds County court ultimately granted Mabus shared custody with the children. He married Lynne Horecky in 2007.

Mabus is a fan of the Boston Red Sox having first followed the team during the 1975 World Series while a student at Harvard Law School. During his tenure as Navy Secretary, he threw ceremonial first pitches at all 30 major league baseball parks in the United States, the only person ever believed to have done so.

=== Acting ===
In 2009, and again in 2014, Mabus made cameo appearances on the TV drama NCIS in the Season 7 episode "Child's Play", and in the Season 12 episode "Semper Fortis", as an NCIS Agent named "Ray". In 2012, he appeared in the movie Battleship as the commanding officer of the USS Ronald Reagan. Mabus made a cameo appearance as himself in the "It's Not a Rumor" episode of the TV series The Last Ship, issuing orders to the crew of the Nathan James via a recorded message; in the storyline, by the time the ship received the orders, Mabus had succumbed to the "Red Flu" virus.

== Works cited ==
- Ball, Howard (2006). Justice in Mississippi: The Murder Trial of Edgar Ray Killen. University Press of Kansas. ISBN 9780700614615.
- Bolton, Charles C. (2013). William F. Winter and the New Mississippi: A Biography. Jackson: University Press of Mississippi. ISBN 978-1-61703-787-0.
- Crockett, James R. (2003). Operation Pretense: The FBI's Sting on County Corruption in Mississippi. Jackson: University Press of Mississippi. ISBN 9781578064960.
- Mullaney, Marie Marmo (1994). Biographical Directory of the Governors of the United States, 1988-1994. Greenwood Publishing Group. ISBN 9780313283123.
- Lamis, Alexander P., ed. (1999). Southern Politics in the 1990s. Louisiana State University Press. ISBN 9780807166765.
- Nash, Jere; Taggart, Andy (2009). Mississippi Politics: The Struggle for Power, 1976-2008 (second ed.). University Press of Mississippi. ISBN 9781604733570.
- Nossiter, Adam (1994). Of Long Memory: Mississippi And The Murder Of Medgar Evers. Reading, Massachusetts: Addison-Wesley. ISBN 9780201483390.
- Pugh, Brian A. (2020). Chaos and Compromise: The Evolution of the Mississippi Budgeting Process. University Press of Mississippi. ISBN 9781496830227.
- Sansing, David G. (2016). Mississippi Governors: Soldiers, Statesmen, Scholars, Scoundrels (first ed.). Oxford: Nautilus Publishing Company. ISBN 978-1-936946-81-5.
- Southwick, Leslie (1998). "Mississippi Supreme Court Elections: A Historical Perspective 1916-1996". Mississippi College Law Review. 18 (1): 115–198.

Political offices
Preceded by Hamp King	Auditor of Mississippi; 1984–1988	Succeeded by Pete Johnson
Preceded by William Allain	Governor of Mississippi; 1988–1992	Succeeded by Kirk Fordice
Preceded by B. J. Penn; Acting	United States Secretary of the Navy; 2009–2017	Succeeded by Richard V. Spencer
Party political offices
Preceded by William Allain	Democratic nominee for Governor of Mississippi; 1987, 1991	Succeeded by Dick Molpus
Diplomatic posts
Preceded by David Welch; Acting	United States Ambassador to Saudi Arabia; 1994–1996	Succeeded by Wyche Fowler
U.S. order of precedence (ceremonial)
Preceded by Martha McSally as Former U.S. Senator	Order of precedence of the United States; Within Mississippi	Succeeded by Ronnie Musgrove as Former Governor
Preceded by Eric Holcomb as Former Governor	Order of precedence of the United States; Outside Mississippi	Succeeded by Ronnie Musgrove as Former Governor
