= Robert O. Work =

American marine, military strategist and politician (born 1953)

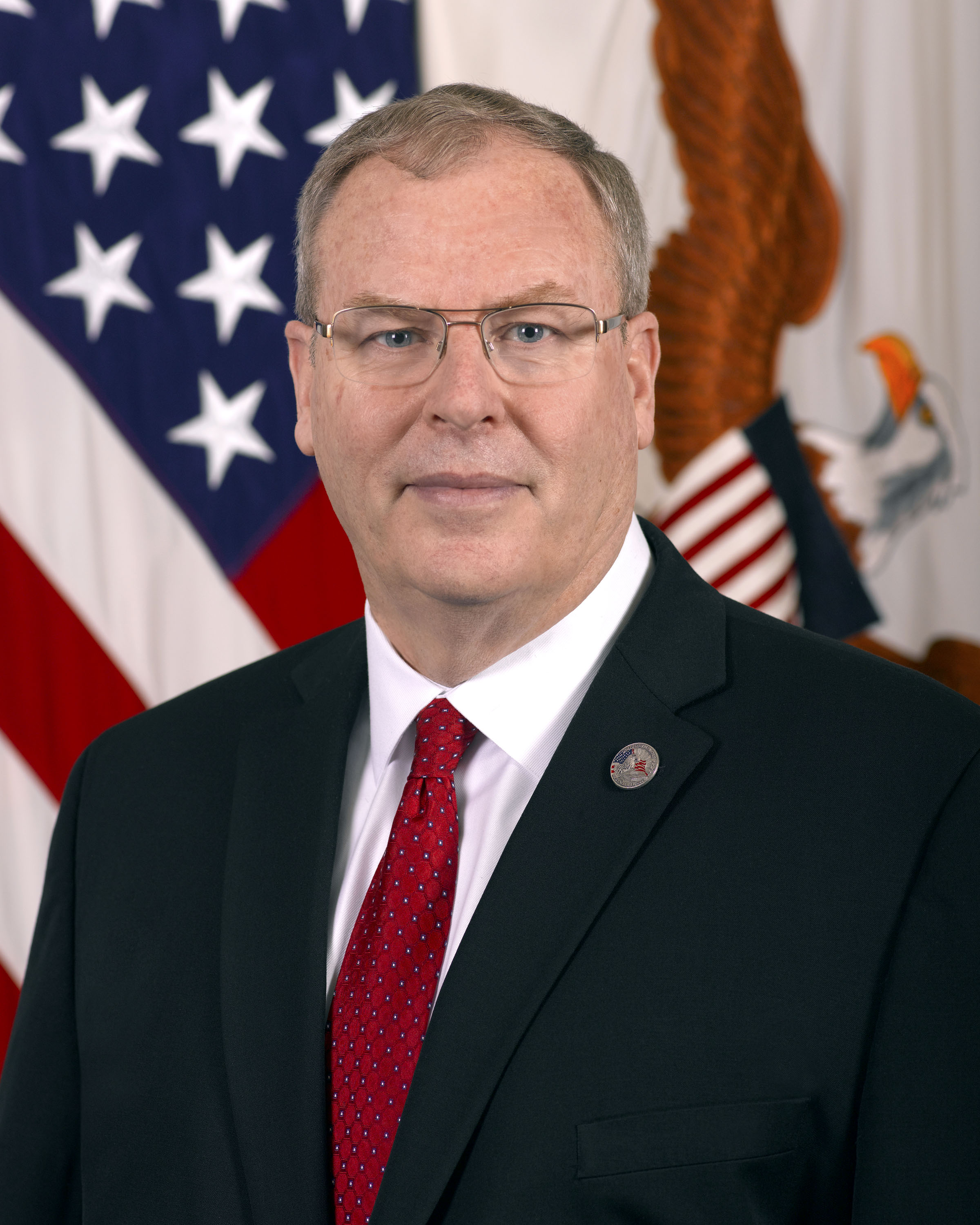
- Official portrait, 2014

32nd United States Deputy Secretary of Defense
- In office May 1, 2014 – July 14, 2017
- President: Barack Obama; Donald Trump
- Secretary: Ash Carter; Jim Mattis
- Preceded by: Ash Carter
- Succeeded by: Patrick M. Shanahan

31st United States Under Secretary of the Navy
- In office May 19, 2009 – March 22, 2013
- President: Barack Obama
- Preceded by: Dionel M. Aviles
- Succeeded by: Janine A. Davidson

Personal details
- Born: Robert Orton Work; January 17, 1953 (age 73) Charlotte, North Carolina, U.S.
- Education: University of Illinois at Urbana–Champaign (BS); University of Southern California (MS); Naval Postgraduate School (MS); Johns Hopkins University (MPA)

Military service
- Allegiance: United States
- Branch/service: United States Marine Corps
- Years of service: 1974–2001
- Rank: Colonel

Robert Orton Work (born January 17, 1953) is an American national security professional who served as the 32nd United States Deputy Secretary of Defense for both the Obama and Trump administrations from 2014 to 2017. Prior to that, Work was the United States' Under Secretary of the Navy from 2009 to 2013, and before that served as a colonel in the United States Marine Corps; Work retired in 2001 and worked as a civilian at the Center for Strategic and Budgetary Assessments (CSBA) and the George Washington University in various positions relating to military and strategic study. From 2013 to 2014, he was the CEO of the Center for a New American Security (CNAS). After his time as Deputy Secretary of Defense, he went on to serve on the board of Raytheon. As of October 2023, he serves on the Special Competitive Studies Project's board of advisors.

== Early life and education ==
Work was born in Charlotte, North Carolina, on January 17, 1953. He attended the University of Illinois and earned a B.S. in Biology. Work later earned an M.S. in Systems Management from the University of Southern California; an M.S. in Space System Operations from the Naval Postgraduate School; and a master's degree in International Policy from the Paul H. Nitze School of Advanced International Studies at Johns Hopkins University.

== Military career ==
Work's military service began while he was an undergraduate at the University of Illinois, where he was a member of the Naval Reserve Officer Training Corps. He was commissioned as a second lieutenant of the United States Marine Corps in September 1974.

Work spent 27 years in the Marines, holding a variety of positions. He commanded an artillery battery, then an artillery battalion. He rose to become base commander of Camp Fuji; the first head of the Marine Corps' Strategic Initiatives Group, a small analytical group that provided advice directly to the Commandant of the Marine Corps; and, in his highest military posting, as Military Assistant and Special Aide to United States Secretary of the Navy Richard Danzig. In 1997–1998, he attended MIT Seminar XXI. Work's rank when he retired from the Marines in 2001 was colonel.

== Civilian career ==
He joined the Center for Strategic and Budgetary Assessments (CSBA) as a senior fellow for maritime affairs. He later became the CSBA's vice president for strategic studies. He also took a position as an adjunct professor at George Washington University, teaching defense analysis and roles and missions of the armed forces. During this period, Work wrote and spoke extensively on naval and marine strategy. He also directed and analyzed war games for the Office of Net Assessment and for the Office of the Secretary of Defense. He participated in the Quadrennial Defense Review in 2006. Work's work has focused on defense strategy; proposals to restructure the Department of Defense; and maritime affairs.

=== Under Secretary of the Navy ===
Flag of the Under Secretary of the Navy

During the presidential transition of Barack Obama, Work was a member of the Department of Defense Transition Team, focusing on the transition at the United States Department of the Navy. President Barack Obama nominated Work as Under Secretary of the Navy and Work was confirmed by the United States Senate on May 19, 2009.

Work has criticized former Defense Secretary Donald Rumsfeld for assuming that the United States would always have an advantage in guided weapons and, as such, be able to quickly defeat any foe.

In July 2011, Work called into question the navy's plans for the Lockheed Martin F-35 Lightning II, asking if the numbers or types could be reduced in favor of more unmanned systems.

In 2012, after submitting a budget request that reduced submarine construction, Work said that only a submarine could operate in the Taiwan Strait during a conflict with China.

In 2013, the Center for a New American Security announced that Work would be their new CEO as of April 22, 2013.

=== Deputy Secretary of Defense ===
Flag of the United States Deputy Secretary of Defense

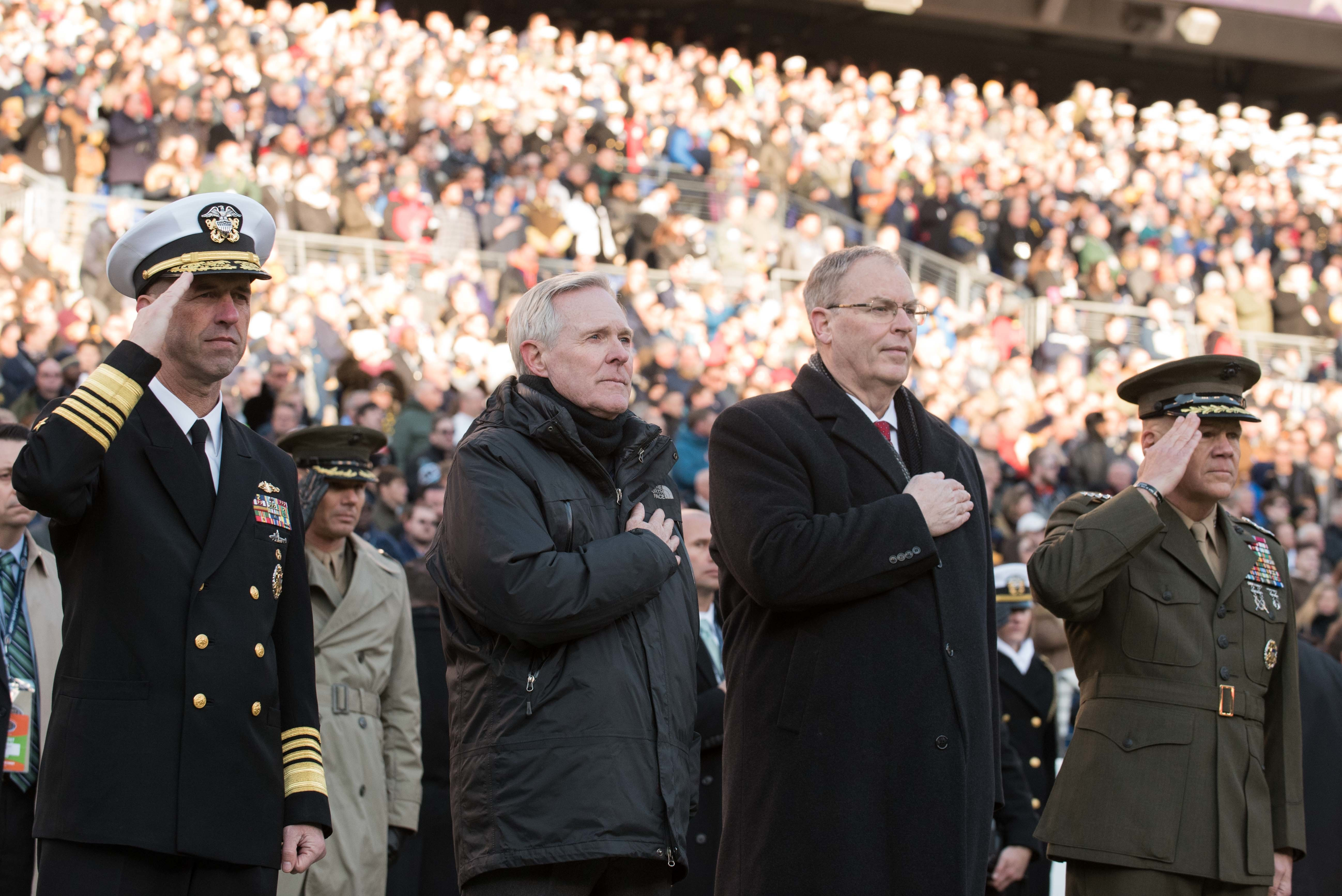
Adm. John M. Richardson, Sec. Ray Mabus, Deputy Sec. Work, and Gen. Robert Neller at the 117th Army–Navy Game in Dec. 2016.

On February 7, 2014, President Obama nominated Work to become Deputy Secretary of Defense.

In October 2014, Deputy Secretary Work instructed the Defense Business Board to hire consultants from McKinsey & Company to identify wasteful spending. McKinsey discovered DoD was spending $134 billion, 23% of its total budget, on back-office work, and that the back-office bureaucracy staff of over one million people was nearly as great as the number of active duty troops. On January 22, 2015, the board then voted to recommend adoption of McKinsey's five-year plan to cut $125 billion in waste.

However, after Secretary Chuck Hagel was replaced by Ash Carter the next month, Deputy Secretary Work expressed his concerns that any gain from savings achieved would then be removed from the defense budget by Congress. Under Secretary Frank Kendall III argued that he could not achieve any efficiencies and, instead, that he needed to hire 1,000 more staff. Secretary Carter then replaced the board chairman, classified the McKinsey results as secret, and removed the report from public websites.

When James Mattis became defense secretary in January 2017, he asked Work to remain as deputy in order to complete several tasks, including preparing an amendment for additional funding in fiscal year 2017 and preparing the fiscal year 2018 budget for submittal in May 2017. This may have marked the first time in history when the top three posts at the Pentagon – secretary, deputy secretary, and Chairman of the Joint Chiefs – were held by Marines.

=== National Security Commission on Artificial Intelligence ===
From 2019 to 2021, Work co-chaired the National Security Commission on Artificial Intelligence with Eric Schmidt.

=== Awards and accolades ===
On March 21, 2013, Robert Work was presented with the Navy Distinguished Public Service Medal, the Department of the Navy's highest award for civilians.

At a farewell ceremony in the Pentagon's auditorium on January 13, 2017, outgoing Defense Secretary Carter pinned Work with the Department of Defense Medal for Distinguished Public Service, the Pentagon's highest award for a civilian.

In December 2019 Work was presented with the Swedish Royal Order of the Polar Star by defense minister Peter Hultqvist.

== Boards & Fellowships ==
- In October 2017, Work joined the Johns Hopkins Applied Physics Laboratory as a Senior Fellow.
- In June 2020, Work joined as chairman of the Board of SparkCognition Government Systems (SGS).
- In June 2020, Govini announced the appointment of Work as its chairman of the board.

== Criticism of Google ==
After retiring as Deputy Defense Secretary, Work in 2018 criticized Google and its employees for, in his view, stepping into a moral hazard for themselves as not continuing Pentagon's artificial intelligence project while helping China's AI technology that could be used against the United States in a conflict. He described Google as hypocritical, given it has opened an AI center in China and said "[a]nything that’s going on in the AI center in China is going to the Chinese government and then will ultimately end up in the hands of the Chinese military. I didn’t see any Google employee saying, ‘Hmm, maybe we shouldn't do that.'"

== Recent publications ==
=== Articles ===
Can the US compete with China? Not without strong patent rights. The Hill, (co-authored with Rama Elluru)

Political offices
Preceded by Ash Carter	United States Deputy Secretary of Defense; 2014–2017	Succeeded by Pat Shanahan
