= Richard V. Spencer =

American politician and businessman (born 1954)

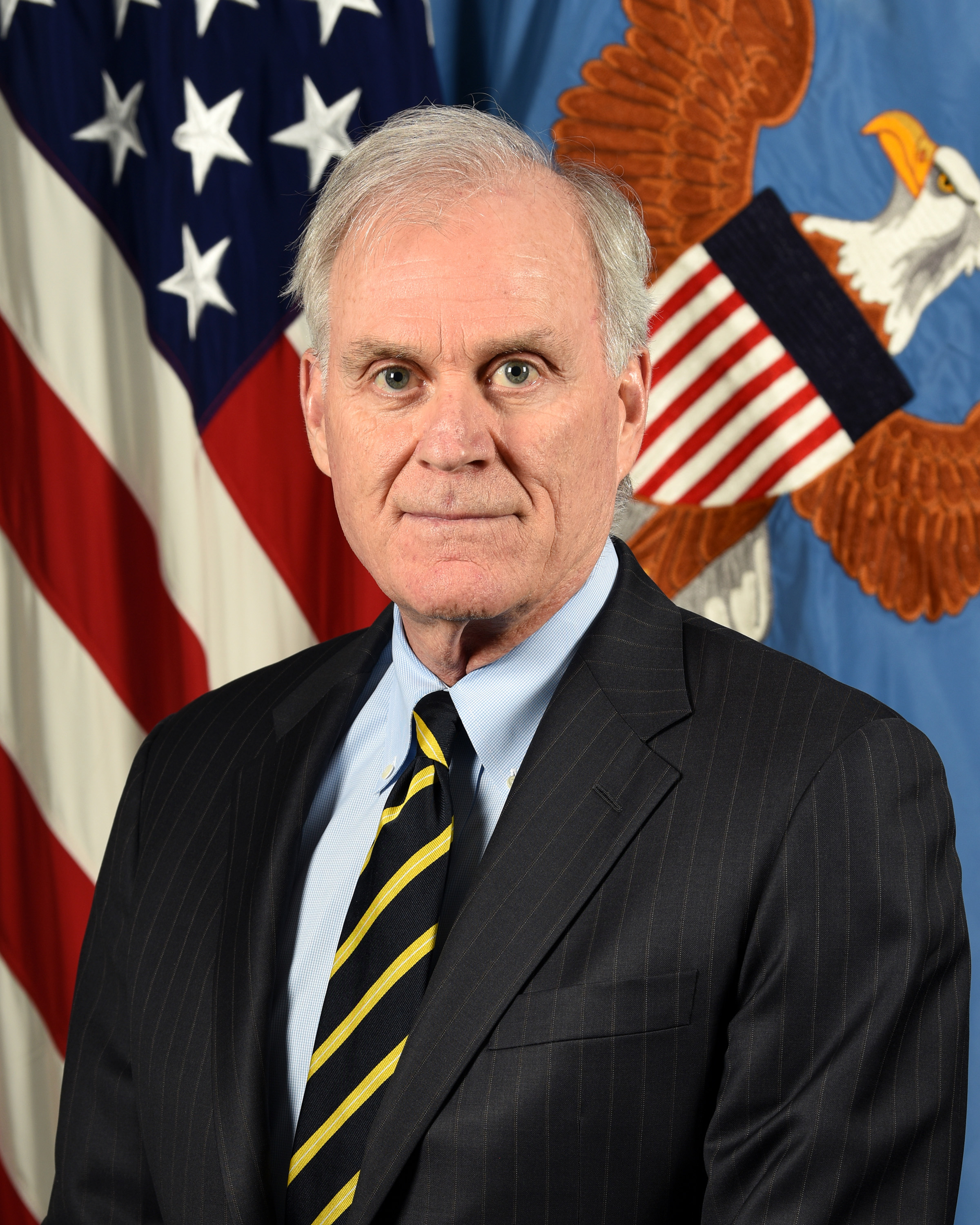
- Official portrait, 2019

76th United States Secretary of the Navy
- In office August 3, 2017 – November 24, 2019
- President: Donald Trump
- Deputy: Thomas Modly
- Preceded by: Ray Mabus
- Succeeded by: Kenneth Braithwaite

Acting United States Deputy Secretary of Defense
- In office July 24 – July 31, 2019
- President: Donald Trump
- Preceded by: David Norquist (acting)
- Succeeded by: David Norquist

Acting United States Secretary of Defense
- In office July 15 – July 23, 2019
- President: Donald Trump
- Deputy: David Norquist (acting)
- Preceded by: Mark Esper (acting)
- Succeeded by: Mark Esper

Personal details
- Born: Richard Vaughn Spencer; January 18, 1954 (age 72) Waterbury, Connecticut, U.S.
- Party: Republican
- Education: Rollins College (BA)

Military service
- Allegiance: United States
- Branch/service: United States Marine Corps
- Years of service: 1976–1981
- Rank: Captain
- *Thomas Modly served in an acting capacity from July 15 to July 31, 2019, while Spencer served as Acting Secretary and then Acting Deputy Secretary of Defense.

Richard Vaughn Spencer (born January 18, 1954) is an American politician and businessman who served as the 76th United States secretary of the Navy from August 3, 2017, to November 24, 2019. While serving as Secretary of the Navy, he also briefly served as Acting United States Secretary of Defense (July 15 to July 23, 2019) and Acting United States Deputy Secretary of Defense (July 24 to July 31, 2019). Spencer served in the U.S. Marine Corps from 1976 to 1981 as a Marine Aviator. He was Vice Chairman and Chief Financial Officer of Intercontinental Exchange (IEX) from November 2001 to January 2008.

On November 24, 2019, Secretary of Defense Mark Esper requested Spencer's resignation due to his handling of the Eddie Gallagher case, specifically that Spencer did not observe the chain of command.

In July 2024, Spencer replaced John Rothwell, the founder and chairman of Austal, as chairman.

== Early life ==
Born in 1954 in Waterbury, Connecticut, Spencer attended Rollins College as an undergraduate, majoring in economics. After graduating, he joined the U.S. Marine Corps, serving as a Marine Aviator from 1976 to 1981. While in the Marines, he was assigned to Marine Medium Helicopter Squadron 161, VMM-161, Marine Aircraft Group 16 with the callsign "Chowder".

== Career ==
After leaving the Marines with the rank of captain, Spencer worked in financial services for 15 years, holding positions at Goldman Sachs, Bear Stearns, Donaldson, Lufkin & Jenrette, A. G. Becker, Paine Webber and Merrill Lynch. Spencer served on the Defense Business Board, a Pentagon advisory panel, from 2009 to 2015 and on the Chief of Naval Operations Executive Panel. During his time on the Defense Business Board, he proposed shutting down domestic military commissaries in favor of negotiated military discounts at public retailers.

=== Secretary of the Navy ===
In June 2017, President Donald Trump nominated Spencer to serve as the 76th United States secretary of the Navy. Spencer was confirmed by the United States Senate on August 1, 2017. He was sworn in on August 3, 2017, and served until November 24, 2019.

On July 15, 2019, Spencer took on the duties of acting Secretary of Defense and expected "to continue to serve in this role until a Secretary of Defense nominee is confirmed by the Senate and assumes office. At that time, I will continue to serve as Secretary of the Navy." From July 24, 2019 until the end of the month, he assumed the duties of Deputy Secretary of Defense.

In November 2019, Secretary of Defense Mark Esper stated he had learned that Spencer had proposed to White House officials that, if they did not intervene with military justice proceedings against Navy SEAL Eddie Gallagher, Spencer would ensure that Gallagher was able to retire with his Trident Pin, a symbol of membership in the SEALs. Gallagher had been convicted by court martial in July 2019 of wrongfully posing for an unofficial picture with a human casualty, and acquitted of six additional charges including murder. Spencer's private proposal to the White House – which he did not share with Esper over the course of several conversations about the matter – contradicted his public position on the Gallagher case, chief Pentagon spokesman Jonathan Hoffman said in a statement. Esper dismissed Spencer on November 24, 2019, saying he was "flabbergasted" by Spencer going directly to the White House outside the chain of command. Spencer then reiterated his public position about Gallagher, and alleged that the White House was pressuring him to let Gallagher retire as a Navy SEAL. The next day Esper told reporters that Trump had issued an order that Gallagher be allowed to retire as a Navy SEAL.

In a letter to Trump acknowledging his termination, Spencer stressed his belief in the importance of "good order and discipline", saying, "Unfortunately, it has become apparent that... I no longer share the same understanding with the Commander in Chief who appointed me, in regards to the key principle of good order and discipline. I cannot in good conscience obey an order that I believe violates the sacred oath I took in the presence of my family, my flag and my faith to support and defend the Constitution of the United States."

On November 27, 2019, The Washington Post published an op-ed by Spencer, in which he said that Trump "has very little understanding of what it means to be in the military", and referred to Trump's actions in the Gallagher case as a "shocking and unprecedented intervention".

== Later career ==
On February 7, 2020, Spencer endorsed Michael Bloomberg for U.S. president in the 2020 U.S. presidential election. He is a member of the Marine Corps Association and Foundation and the Marine Corps Aviation Association.

Political offices
Preceded by Ray Mabus	United States Secretary of the Navy; 2017–2019	Succeeded by Thomas Modly; Acting
Preceded by Mark Esper; Acting	United States Secretary of Defense; Acting; 2019	Succeeded by Mark Esper
Preceded by David Norquist; Acting	United States Deputy Secretary of Defense; Acting; 2019	Succeeded by David Norquist
