= Gregory J. Slavonic =

American Navy official and retired admiral (born 1949)

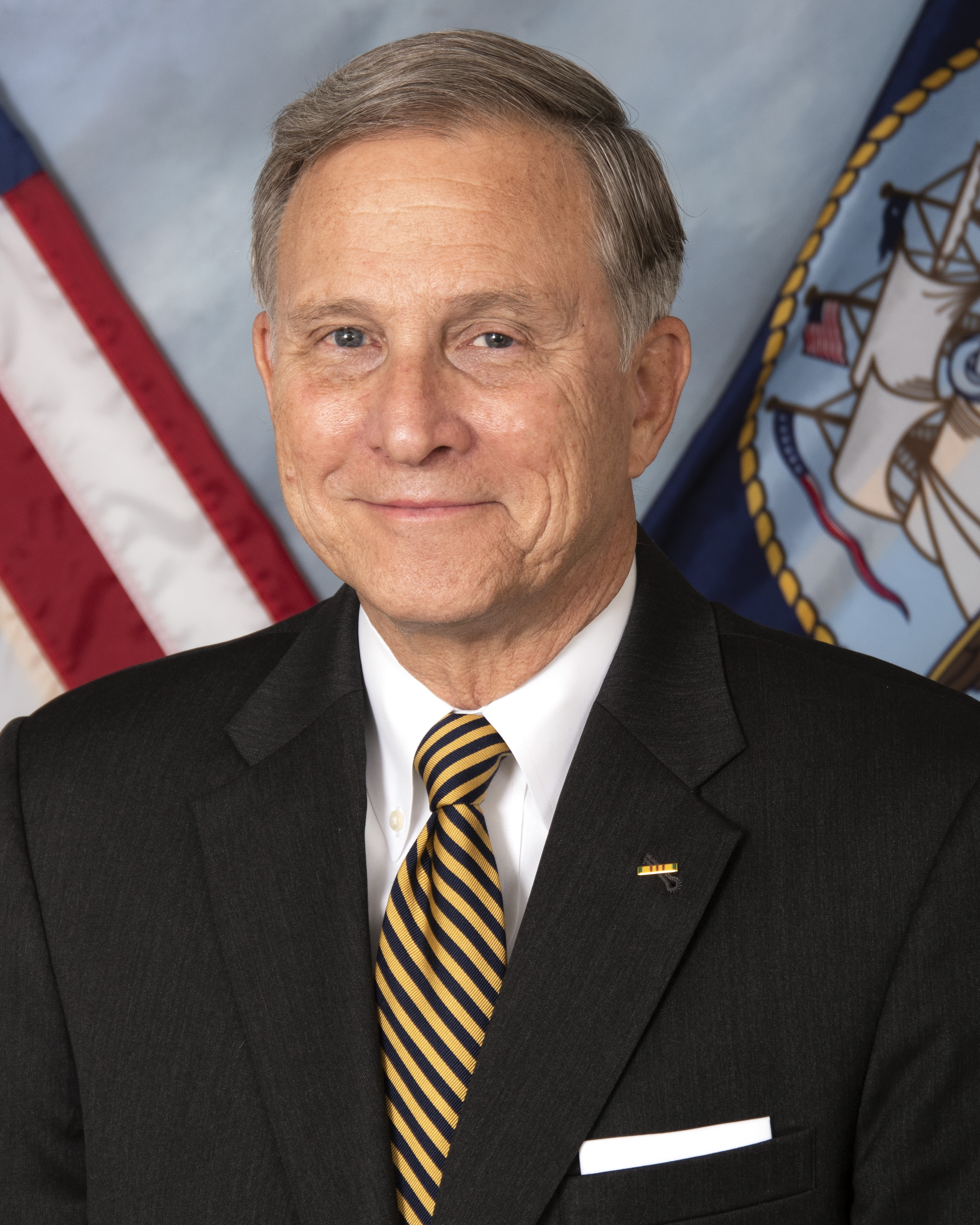

Acting United States Under Secretary of the Navy
- In office April 24, 2020 – January 20, 2021
- President: Donald Trump
- Preceded by: Thomas Modly
- Succeeded by: James F. Geurts (acting)

18th Assistant Secretary of the Navy (Manpower and Reserve Affairs)
- In office June 11, 2018 – January 20, 2021
- President: Donald Trump
- Preceded by: Franklin R. Parker
- Succeeded by: Franklin R. Parker

6th Navy Vice Chief of Information
- In office June 1, 2001 – June 1, 2005

Personal details
- Born: Gregory Joseph Slavonic; May 6, 1949 (age 77) Great Bend, Kansas, U.S.
- Party: Republican
- Education: Oklahoma State University, B.S. University of Central Oklahoma, M.Ed.
- Awards: Legion of Merit Medal; Bronze Star Medal (2); Meritorious Service Medal (2); Combat Action Ribbon; Presidential Unit Citation

Military service
- Allegiance: United States
- Branch/service: United States Navy
- Years of service: 1971–2005
- Rank: Rear admiral (lower half)
- Battles/wars: Vietnam War; Gulf War; Iraq War

Gregory Joseph Slavonic is an American government official and retired U.S. Navy officer. He has served as Acting Under Secretary of the Navy from April 24, 2020 to January 20, 2021. He also served as the U.S. Senate-confirmed 18th United States Assistant Secretary of the Navy for Manpower and Reserve Affairs (ASN M&RA) from June 11, 2018 to January 20, 2021. Slavonic retired as a one-star rear admiral serving 34 years in the United States Navy and the Navy Reserve.

== Early life and education ==
Slavonic was born in Great Bend, Kansas and moved to Oklahoma City, Oklahoma at an early age. His father was a veteran of World War II. Slavonic graduated from Bishop McGuinness Catholic High School in 1967 and graduated from Oklahoma State University in 1971 with a Bachelor of Science degree in Journalism.

Following his military service, Slavonic attended the University of Central Oklahoma and graduated in summer 1976 with a master's degree in education.

== Military career ==
Slavonic enlisted in the United States Navy in 1971. After finishing boot camp and Signalman "A" school, he was sent to the aircraft carrier USS Constellation, which was deployed off the coast of Vietnam in the Tonkin Gulf, supporting combat operations for U.S. troops during the Vietnam War.

=== Returning home ===
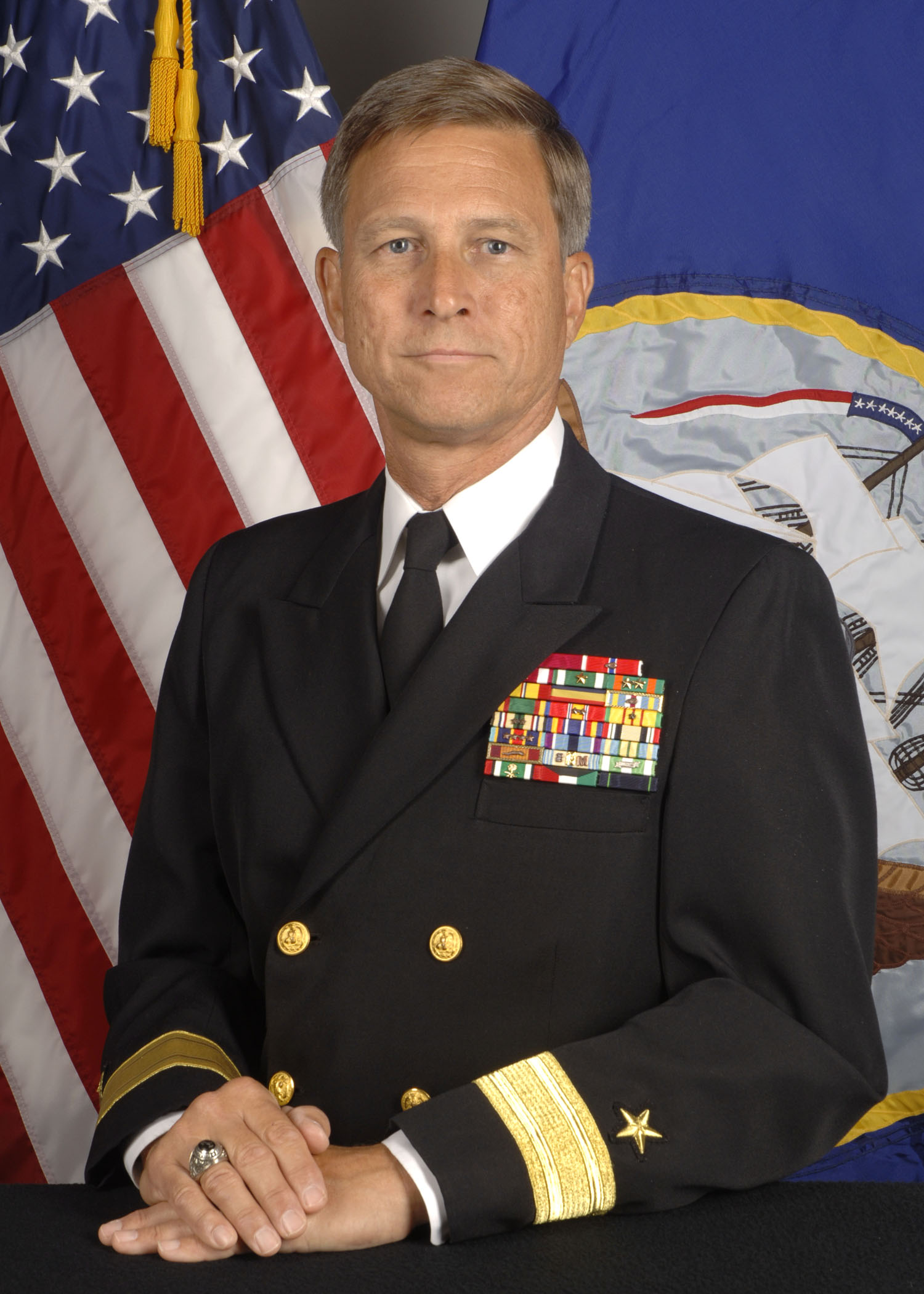
Official portrait of Rear Admiral Gregory J. Slavonic serving as the Navy's vice chief of information, circa 2005.

Upon his return from sea duties, Slavonic was discharged from active service and entered the United States Navy Reserve in Oklahoma City where he earned a commission as an Ensign. He achieved the rank of Commander in the Navy Reserve and was recalled to active service in November 1990 for the Gulf War. Slavonic was then assigned to the staff of U.S. Central Command under General Norman Schwarzkopf Jr. and assumed duty with the Navy public affairs section, Joint Information Bureau in Dhahran, Saudi Arabia.

Slavonic served as Chief of the Navy News Desk and Combat Media Escort Officer, leading Combat Correspondent Pools aboard the guided-missile frigate USS Curtis, where he documented the processing and interrogation of over 40 Iraqi prisoners of war and the removal of floating Iraqi mines that threatened U.S. and international shipping. He also led a media pool aboard the 18,000-ton amphibious assault ship USS Tripoli in the Persian Gulf, where the ship struck an Iraqi underwater mine the following day. He was released from active duty on July 1, 1991, and returned to the Navy Reserve.

During his reserve duty, he commanded four public affairs units and served as executive officer and training officer for several others. He was also the public affairs officer for Rear Admirals Pete Pettigrew and Bob Smith III, Commanders at the Navy Reserve Region Readiness and Mobilization Command, Region 11 at Naval Air Station Dallas.

Promoted to Rear Admiral (Lower Half) on June 1, 2001, Slavonic served as the 6th Navy Vice Chief of Information, overseeing all aspects of the Navy's Public Affairs Program. He worked closely with the Navy's Chief of Information, establishing and maintaining liaison with the Office of the Chief of Naval Operations, the Navy Secretariat, and other Department of Defense commands, particularly within the Pentagon and Washington, D.C. He also led two Joint U.S. Military Assistance Teams to Manila, advising the Armed Forces of the Philippines on strategic communications operations.

In addition to his duties, Slavonic oversaw the Navy Reserve Program 35, responsible for training and managing over 600 public affairs officers and enlisted journalists. Following the 9/11 attacks and the onset of the Iraq War, he mobilized over 200 Navy Reserve personnel to support combat operations, both at sea and on land, over the next four years.

=== Iraq active duty ===
Slavonic was recalled to active duty in June 2004 to support Operation Enduring Freedom in Baghdad, Iraq. He became the first U.S. Navy flag officer assigned to the Multinational Force Iraq (MNF-I) staff, where he served as the Director of Strategic Communications and Public Affairs Officer for the Army Commanding General of MNF-I.

While in Iraq, he coordinated the largest media event for the newly formed MNF-I on July 1, 2004—the first court appearance of former Iraqi President Saddam Hussein since his capture on December 13, 2003. This event, which was broadcast worldwide, also included the arraignment of 11 members of Saddam's cabinet, several of whom were on Iraq's "most wanted" list, including "Chemical Ali" and Tariq Aziz. The six-hour session marked the last time all twelve men would appear together. Slavonic later wrote a book about this event, Charging a Tyrant: The Arraignment of Saddam Hussein. He also served as Director of the Combined Press Information Center (CPIC) in Iraq.

== Retirement and post-Navy career ==
Slavonic retired from the Navy and Navy Reserve in June 2005 after 34 years of service, which included active duty in three wars. Following his retirement, he was contacted by Computer Sciences Corporation to assist in drafting a Request for Proposal for a new community outreach contract.

=== Public sector ===
Slavonic served as the first Chief of Staff to U.S. Senator James Lankford in the United States Senate, a position he held until February 2018. Following his tenure in the Senate, he joined the Oklahoma Department of Mental Health and Substance Abuse Services.

In March 2023, Slavonic was appointed executive director of the Oklahoma Department of Veterans Affairs (ODVA). The agency manages seven veterans’ homes across the state, provides services to over 350,000 Oklahoma veterans, and oversees a team of 1,500 employees. With an annual budget of $160 million, Slavonic led efforts to support Oklahoma's veteran community. He resigned from this position in July 2024.

=== Political appointee ===
On December 5, 2017, President Donald Trump nominated Slavonic to serve as the 18th Assistant Secretary of the Navy for Manpower and Reserve Affairs (ASN M&RA), a Senate-confirmed position responsible for overseeing manpower and reserve component affairs for both the Navy and Marine Corps. This role included the development of programs and policies related to military personnel (active, reserve, and retired), recruiting, family members, and the civilian workforce. Additionally, he was tasked with tracking the contractor workforce and overseeing human resources within the United States Department of the Navy. During his tenure as ASN (M&RA), both the Navy and Marine Corps successfully met their recruiting goals.

Slavonic departed this position on January 20, 2021, with the change in administration.

=== Private sector ===
From 1976 to 2008, Slavonic held several leadership positions in the newspaper and television industries before joining Computer Sciences Corporation. He served as President of FlagBridge Strategic Communications for more than six years. Additionally, he was invited to be a minority owner and investor in the Oklahoma City Cavalry professional basketball team, the first pro basketball team in Oklahoma City.

From 2007 to 2009, Slavonic served as executive director of the Jim Thorpe Association and the Oklahoma Sports Hall of Fame.

Slavonic is the President & CEO of Blue-Water Strategies, LLC.

In addition to his consulting work, Slavonic has served as an adjunct professor at the University of Central Oklahoma. He has also served as a Senior Advisor at American Global Strategies, a Washington, D.C.–based consulting firm.

== Bibliography ==
- The Jim Thorpe Award – The First 20 Years (with Bob Burke) (2007) ISBN 0964514052
- Leadership in Action (2010) ISBN 9780984551163
- Profiles in Patriotic Leadership (2012) ISBN 9781937592172
- Charging A Tyrant - The Arraignment of Saddam Hussein (2023) ISBN 9781682831649

== Awards and decorations ==
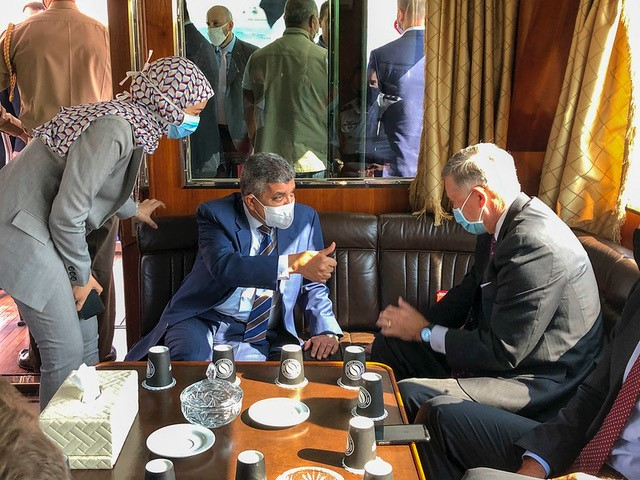
Under Secretary Slavonic meets with Suez Canal Authority Chairman and Managing Director Admiral Osama Mounier Mohamed Rabie at Suez Canal headquarters.

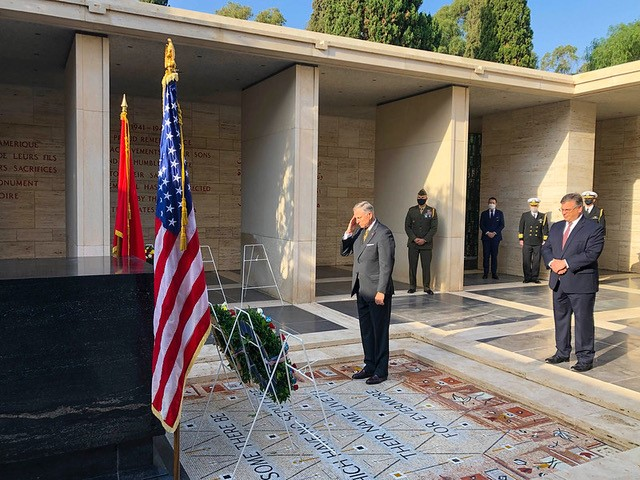
Under Secretary Slavonic participates in a wreath-laying ceremony with U.S. Ambassador Donald Blome on Veteran's Day at North African American Cemetery, Tunis, Tunisia.

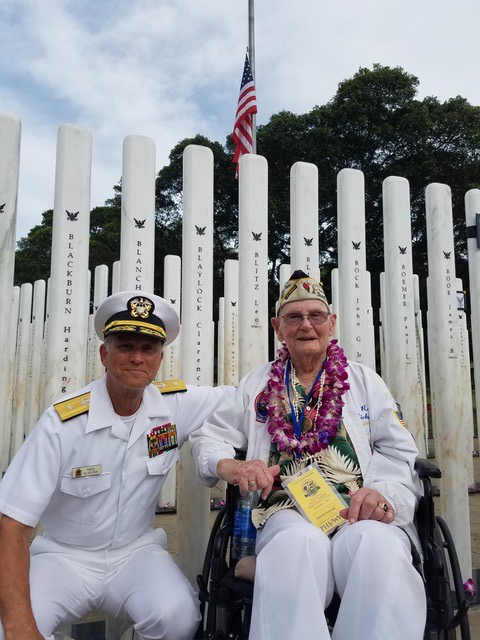
Rear Admiral Slavonic with USS Oklahoma and Pearl Harbor Survivor Ray Richmond at the USS Oklahoma Memorial on Ford Island, Pearl Harbor.

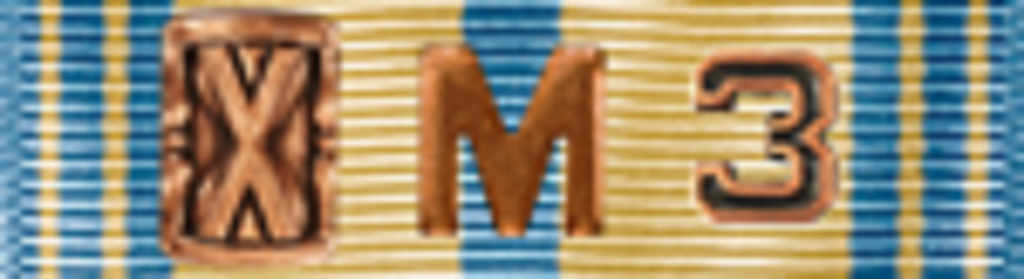

Legion of Merit	Bronze Star Medal w/ 1 award star	Meritorious Service Medal w/ 1 award star
Navy and Marine Corps Commendation Medal w/ 1 award star	Navy and Marine Corps Achievement Medal w/ 2 award stars	Combat Action Ribbon
Navy Presidential Unit Citation	Joint Meritorious Unit Award w/ 1 oak leaf cluster	Navy Unit Commendation
National Defense Service Medal w/ 2 service stars	Vietnam Service Medal w/ 2 service stars	Southwest Asia Service Medal w/ 2 service stars
Iraq Campaign Medal w/ 2 award stars	Global War on Terrorism Service Medal	Humanitarian Service Medal
Military Outstanding Volunteer Service Medal	Navy Sea Service Deployment Ribbon w/ 3 service stars	Navy and Marine Corps Overseas Service Ribbon
Armed Forces Reserve Medal w/ Bronze Hourglass Device and 3 awards of the Mobilization Device	Vietnam Gallantry Cross Unit Citation w/ Palm	Republic of Vietnam Campaign Medal
Kuwait Liberation Medal (Saudi Arabia)	Kuwait Liberation Medal (Kuwait)	Navy Expert Pistol Shot Medal
