= Stuart P. Baker =

American Navy admiral

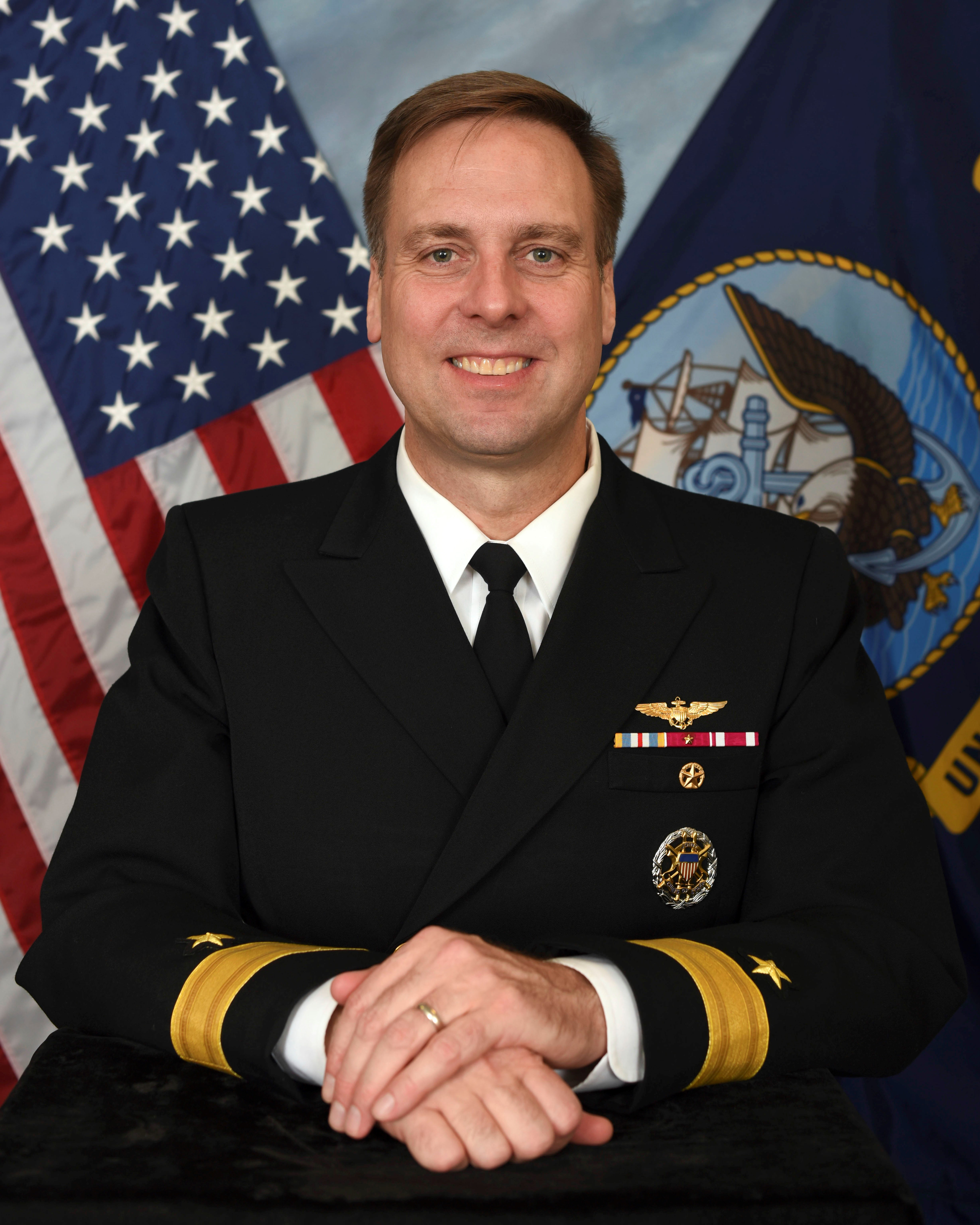
- Military career
- Allegiance: United States
- Branch: United States Navy
- Service years: 1989–2022
- Rank: Rear Admiral (lower half)
- Commands: Carrier Strike Group 9 CVW-9; VFA-137
- Conflicts: War in Afghanistan; Iraq War
- Awards: Defense Superior Service Medal; Legion of Merit (2)

Stuart P. Baker is a retired United States Navy officer, holding the rank of rear admiral.

== Early life and education ==
Baker is a native of La Crosse, Wisconsin; graduated in 1989 from Miami University in Ohio with a Bachelor of Science in Paper Science and Engineering; and received his commission via the Naval Reserve Officers Training Corps.

== Naval career ==
Baker became a naval aviator in 1991. He received a master's degree from the Naval War College. He served in Operation Southern Watch stationed aboard the USS Constellation. After spending time with Carrier Air Wing Fourteen as a CVW-14 strike operations officer, he was deployed in support of United States operations in the Iraq War, serving with VFA-146 aboard the USS John C. Stennis in the Arabian Gulf and CVW-9 aboard the same ship. He also commanded VFA-137 on the USS Abraham Lincoln. He was selected for promotion to rear admiral in 2017.

Baker's assignments ashore have included being stationed with Strike Fighter Weapons School Pacific, the Naval Strike and Air Warfare Center as executive officer of the TOPGUN program and United States Fleet Forces Command.

In 2020, Baker was the commanding officer of Carrier Strike Group 9, deployed in the Pacific; he was stationed aboard the aircraft carrier USS Theodore Roosevelt, the flagship of the strike group, which consists of the Theodore Roosevelt and seven other ships. The Theodore Roosevelt departed from its Naval Base San Diego home port in mid-January, with more than 6,000 sailors on board, for a seven-month deployment in the Western Pacific (Indo-Pacific Command) region. In March, during the COVID-19 pandemic, there was an outbreak of coronavirus disease 2019 aboard the ship, which was ordered to port in Guam. The Theodore Roosevelt's captain, Brett Crozier, urged to have most of the sailors immediately removed from the ship, quarantined ashore, and tested for the virus to prevent the spread of the disease. Baker, his superior officer, disagreed, feeling such an action was impractical and too drastic. On March 29, after four days of his pleas being rebuffed by Baker and other superiors, Crozier sent a four-page memorandum to ten Navy officers including Baker and his two immediate superiors, Admiral John C. Aquilino and Vice Admiral DeWolfe Miller III. Crozier begged for the ship to be mostly evacuated because of the risk to the crew. A few days later Crozier was relieved of command by Acting Secretary of the Navy Thomas Modly, who blamed Crozier for sending his memorandum over "non-secure unclassified email" to a "broad array of people" and accused Crozier of having "unnecessarily raised the alarm" about the virus. The day after Crozier's letter became public, the Navy began to evacuate the ship. By 13 April 585 crew members had tested positive for the disease and one had died. A Navy inquiry, whose results were announced on 19 June, concluded that Crozier and Baker made poor decisions regarding the coronavirus outbreak, so that Baker's scheduled promotion to two-star admiral will be put on hold.
