= Janine A. Davidson =

American public servant

Janine Davidson
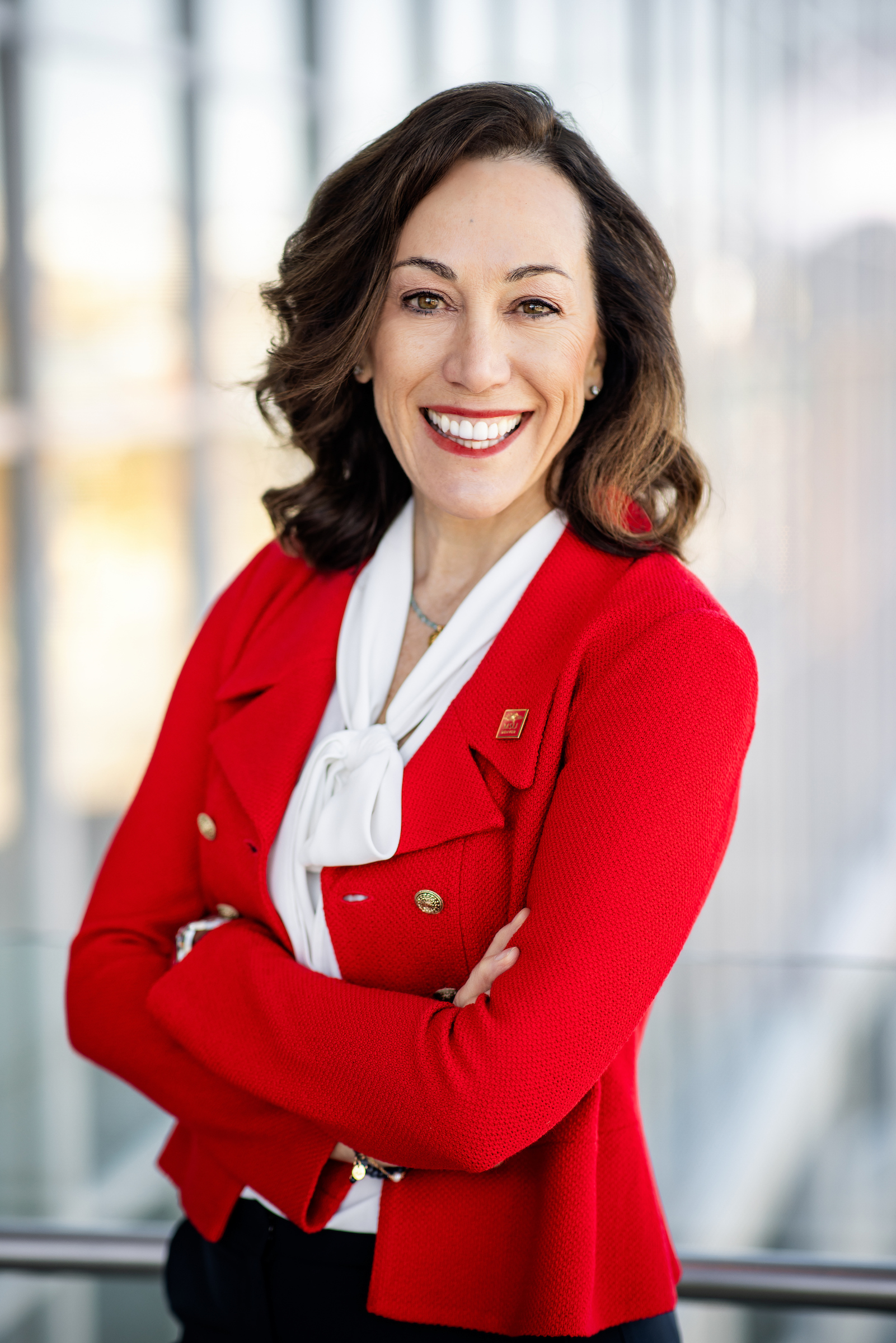

President of Metropolitan State University of Denver
- Incumbent
- Assumed office July 24, 2017
- Preceded by: Stephen Jordan

United States Under Secretary of the Navy
- In office March 17, 2016 – January 20, 2017
- President: Barack Obama
- Preceded by: Robert O. Work
- Succeeded by: Thomas Modly

Personal details
- Born: Janine Anne Davidson; April 24, 1966 (age 60) Oxnard, California, U.S.
- Education: University of Colorado, Boulder (BS); University of South Carolina (MA, PhD)

Military service
- Allegiance: United States
- Branch/service: United States Air Force
- Years of service: 1988–1998

Janine Anne Davidson (born April 24, 1966) is an American public servant who has served as the president of the Metropolitan State University of Denver since 2017. Davidson is known for expertise on topics such as military operations, U.S. foreign policy and national security policy as well as higher education leadership.

She served in the United States Air Force and was Under Secretary of the United States Navy from 2016 to 2017. She is the author of Lifting the Fog of Peace: How Americans Learned to Fight Modern War, a study of organizational learning and institutional change within the U.S. military.

== Early life and education ==
Davidson grew up in a Navy family in California and Virginia. Davidson attended the University of Colorado at Boulder and earned a B.S. in Architectural Engineering. She later earned a master's degree and Ph.D. in international studies from the University of South Carolina.

== Military career ==
Davidson was commissioned as an Air Force second lieutenant in 1988. She flew combat support, airdrop, and humanitarian air mobility missions in the Pacific, Europe and the Middle East in both the Lockheed C-130 Hercules and the Boeing C-17 Globemaster cargo aircraft, making her the first woman to fly the Air Force's tactical C-130. She also served as an instructor pilot at the United States Air Force Academy and was a distinguished graduate of Air Force Squadron Officers’ School.

== Civilian career ==
Following the conclusion of her Air Force career in 1998, Davidson pursued doctoral studies in international affairs at the University of South Carolina. From 2006 to 2008, she served as director of Stability Operations Capabilities within the office of the Assistant Secretary of Defense (Special Operations/Low Intensity Conflict). Davidson was founding director of the Consortium for Complex Operations, later renamed the Center for Complex Operations (CCO), a research center within the National Defense University that studies military and civilian coordination in stability operations.

From 2009 to 2012, Davidson served as deputy assistant secretary of defense for plans, where she oversaw the formulation and review of military war plans and global force posture policy. She was recognized with the Secretary of Defense Medal for Outstanding Public Service.

Following her service in the Pentagon, Davidson taught courses on national security policy and civil-military relations at the Graduate School of Public Policy at George Mason University. She has also taught at Davidson College, Georgetown University and various professional military schools.

On January 17, 2014, Davidson accepted the position of senior fellow for defense policy at the Council on Foreign Relations. During this time, Davidson also served as a presidentially appointed member of the National Commission on the Structure of the Air Force, which recommended changes to service structure and management policies. She was also a member of the Reserve Forces Policy Board.

In 2019, Davidson was elected as a Fellow of the National Academy of Public Administration.

=== Under Secretary of the United States Navy ===
On September 18, 2015, it was announced that Davidson had been nominated by President Barack Obama to become Under Secretary of the United States Navy. She was confirmed by the United States Congress and assumed her post on March 17, 2016.

=== President of Metropolitan State University of Denver ===
On February 14, 2017, Metropolitan State University of Denver announced that Davidson would become the next president of the university, succeeding Stephen M. Jordan, Ph.D.

As the university's ninth president, Davidson has championed the role colleges and universities play in “holding the line on the American Dream." Davidson has supported the DREAM Act and MSU Denver's Deferred Action for Childhood Arrivals students. In 2019, Colorado Gov. Jared Polis signed House Bill 19-1196 in the lobby of the Jordan Student Success Building, allowing eligible undocumented students access to state financial aid.

She was a presenter at TEDx MSU Denver, where she analyzed the value of a college degree as well as the future of higher education.

== Personal life ==
Davidson is married to David Kilcullen, an author, strategist and counterinsurgency expert.

== Appointments and Accolades ==
Davidson chairs the Defense Policy Board Advisory Committee. She is a National Association of Public Administrators fellow, a life member of the Council on Foreign Relations, and recently served as a presidentially appointed commissioner for the National Commission on Military, National and Public Service.

Davidson's honors include: HillVets Top 100 Most Influential Veterans, University of South Carolina Distinguished Alumna, Secretary of the Navy Medal for Distinguished Public Service, Secretary of Defense Medal for Outstanding Public Service, Girl Scouts of Colorado 2018 “Woman of Distinction,” one of the Colorado Women's Chamber of Commerce 2019 “Top 25 Most Powerful Women in Business,” a 2021 Denver Business Journal Most Admired CEO, and a 2022 9NEWS Leader of the Year finalist.

Political offices
Preceded by Robert O. Work	United States Under Secretary of the Navy; 2016–2017	Succeeded by Thomas P. Dee; Acting
