= Defense Business Board =

Advisory board to the Pentagon

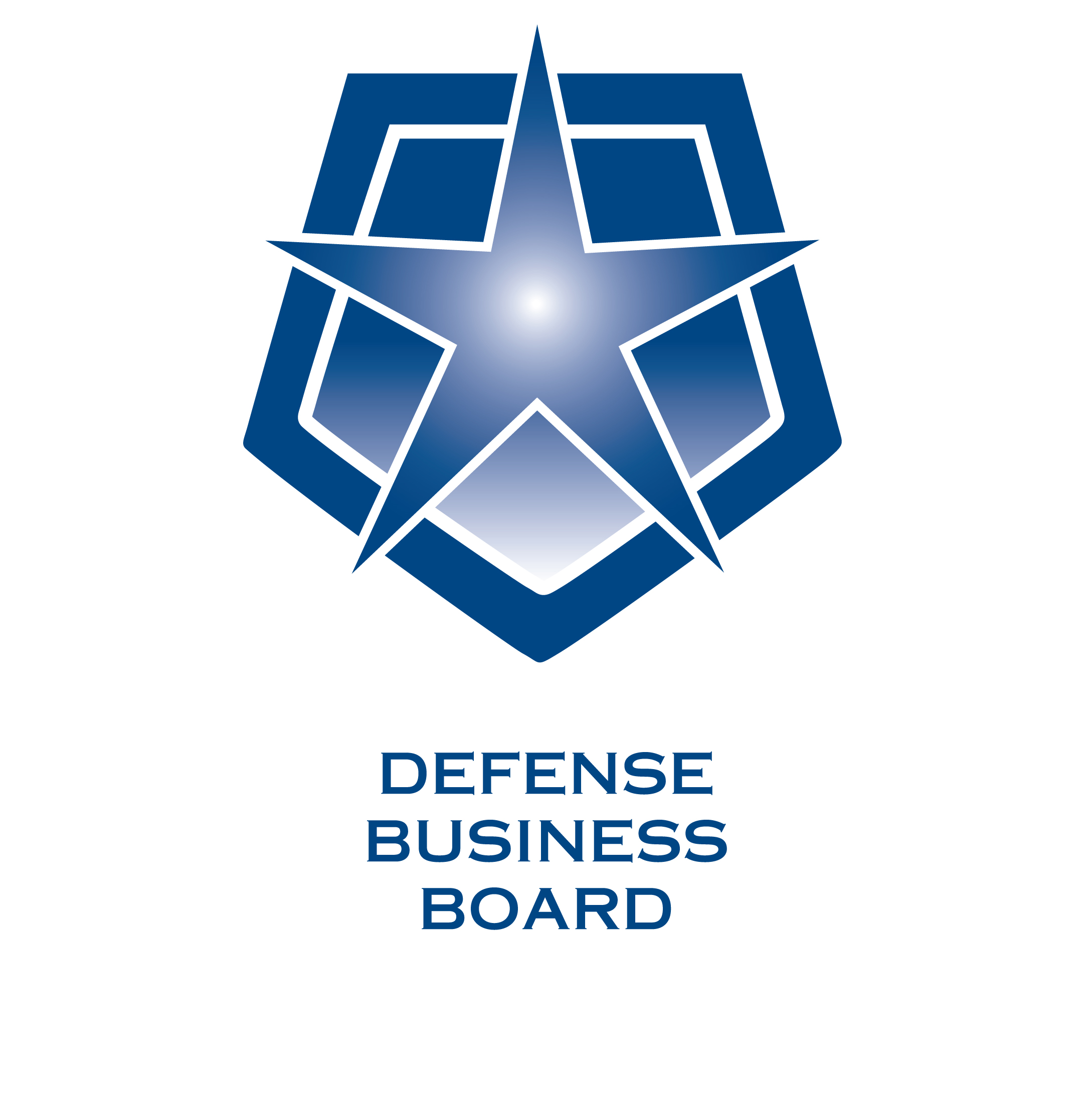

The Defense Business Board in the United States was established in 2001 as a complement to broader transformation efforts in the Department of Defense to move from an overly burdensome bureaucracy to a more streamlined, effective organization. The board consists of approximately 20 private-sector executives with experience in business management. The purpose of the board is to provide independent advice that reflects an outside, private-sector perspective on best business practices for application within the department. The board's objective is to enhance the efficiency and effectiveness of organizational support to the nation's warfighters.

The board operates under the provisions of the Federal Advisory Committee Act of 1972, as amended, and follows a secretary of defense- approved charter, available on the DoD Defense Business Board website.

The board members, including the board's chairperson, are appointed annually by the United States Secretary of Defense and do not receive any payment for their services. The chairs of the Defense Policy Board and the Defense Science Board serve as non-voting ex officio members of the board. The director of the Office of Management and Budget and the comptroller general of the General Accounting Office serve as non-voting observers of the board.

In October 2014, Deputy Secretary Robert O. Work instructed the board to hire consultants from McKinsey & Company to identify wasteful spending. McKinsey discovered DoD was spending $134 billion, 23% of its total budget, on back-office work, and that the back-office bureaucracy staff of over one million people was nearly as great as the number of active duty troops. On January 22, 2015, the board then voted to adopt a McKinsey plan to cut $125 billion in waste over five years.

After Secretary Chuck Hagel was replaced by Ash Carter the next month, however, Deputy Secretary Work expressed he was concerned that the gain from any savings achieved would then be removed from the defense budget by Congress. Under Secretary Frank Kendall III argued that he could not achieve any efficiencies and, instead, that he needed to hire 1,000 more staff. Secretary Carter then replaced the board chairman, classified the McKinsey results as secret, and removed the report from public websites.

In 2016, the DBB provided the model for the Defense Innovation Advisory Board, which was established by Defense Secretary Carter during the 2016 RSA cyber security conference in San Francisco.

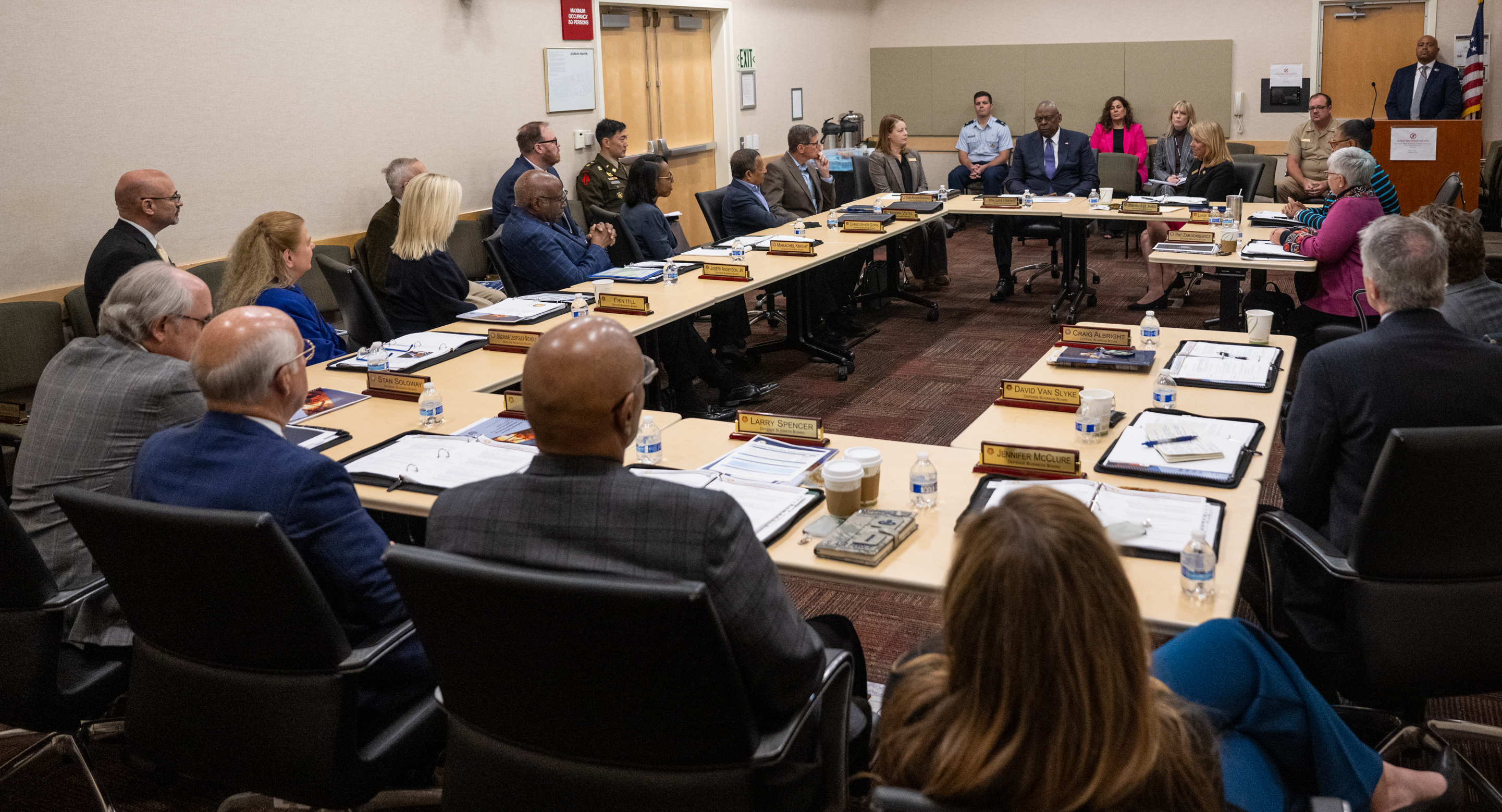
United States Secretary of Defense Lloyd Austin meets with members of the Defense Business Board at the Pentagon on November 12, 2024

In December 2020, the outgoing Trump administration replaced the majority of the board with new appointees, including Trump allies Corey Lewandowski and David Bossie, as well as future Congressman Cory Mills.

In February 2021, President Joe Biden ordered Secretary of Defense Lloyd Austin to suspend all members of the Pentagon's advisory boards, including the DBB, and request all Trump appointees step down, permanently.
