= COVID-19 pandemic on Charles de Gaulle =

COVID-19 pandemic on aircraft carrier Charles de Gaulle

COVID-19 pandemic on board Charles de Gaulle
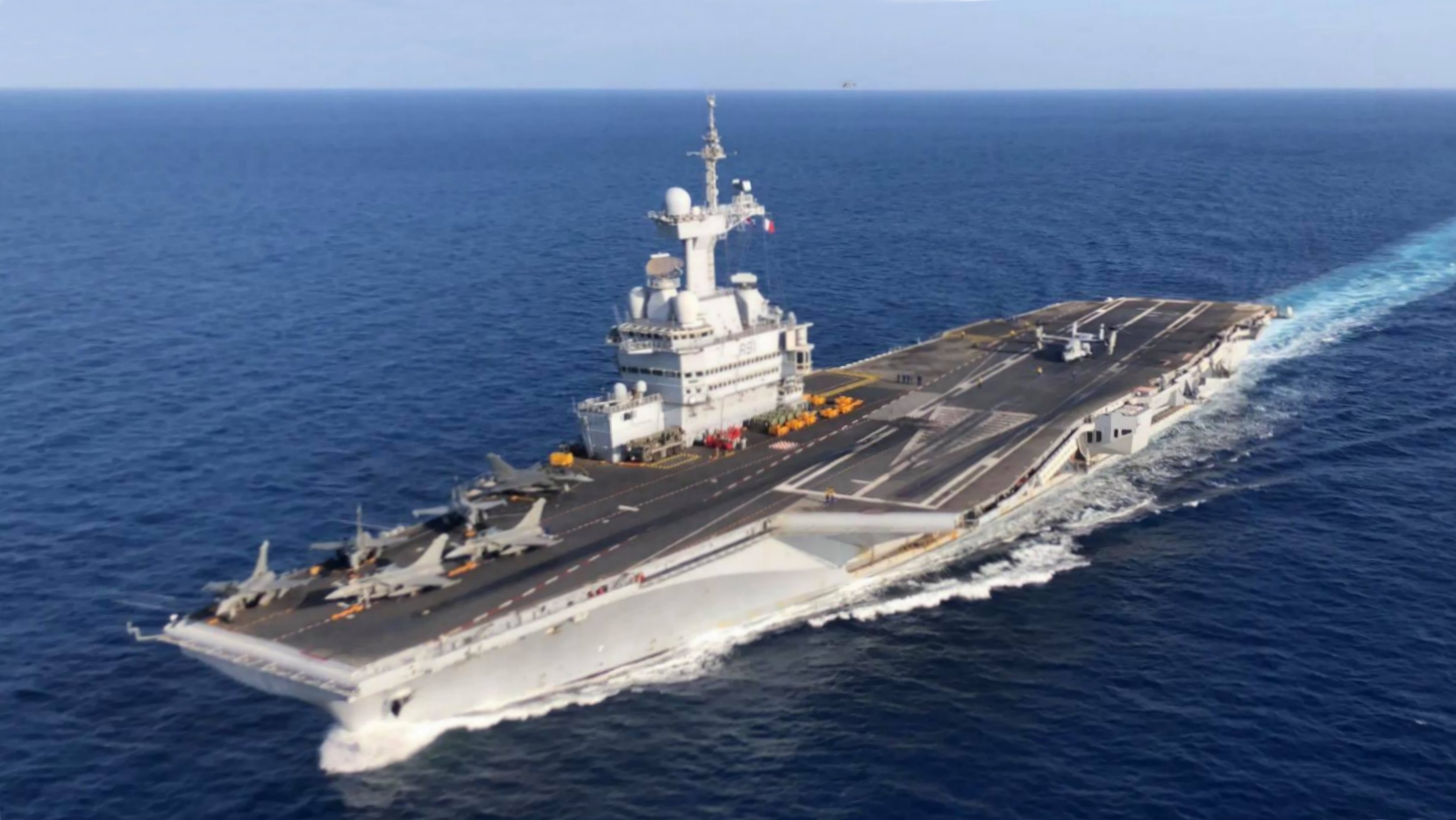
- Charles de Gaulle in April 2019
- Disease: COVID-19
- Pathogen: SARS-CoV-2
- Location: North Sea
- Index case: Charles de Gaulle
- Arrival date: 10 April 2020 (6 years, 1 month, 1 week and 1 day)
- Confirmed cases: 1,046
- Recovered: Unknown
- Deaths: 0

In April 2020, the COVID-19 pandemic reached the French aircraft carrier Charles de Gaulle and the Aeronaval Group of the Naval Action Force, its carrier battle group.

== Background ==
A mid-sized carrier, Charles de Gaulle is smaller than American supercarriers but larger than similar ships operated or retired by Russia, India, and Brazil. Charles de Gaulle was constructed for the French Navy in Brest between 1989 and 1994, with the ship's completion being severely delayed by budget cuts and mechanical problems. It became fully operational in 2001 after completing tests at sea. After Charles de Gaulle was commissioned, the French government quickly deployed it to support the War in Afghanistan. The ship also saw active service in supporting NATO's military intervention in Libya (2011) and the International military intervention against ISIL (2015) before undergoing a nearly two-year refit.

In January 2020, the French government ordered Charles de Gaulle and its associated carrier battle group to deploy to the Eastern Mediterranean for further operations against ISIL, after which it would transit through the Strait of Gibraltar and engage in multinational training exercises in the Atlantic Ocean and North Sea.

== Causes and event ==
After several weeks in the eastern Mediterranean, Charles de Gaulle proceeded to the Atlantic and North Sea for naval exercises alongside her battle group, which consisted of the air-defense frigate Chevalier Paul, the anti-submarine frigate La Motte-Picquet, the command and replenishment ship French tanker Somme, and a nuclear-powered submarine. From 13 to 15 March, Charles de Gaulle was docked in Brest for a brief port visit. The enactment of a strict lockdown to combat the ongoing coronavirus pandemic came two days after the ship left Brest, and the sailors were allowed shore leave that included seeing family members and visiting local commercial establishments. Charles de Gaulle's crew did not have contact with the outside world for the next three weeks. Belgium's frigate Leopold I, part of the carrier battle group, was ordered to prepare to leave the force on 24 March after detecting a single coronavirus case. The nature of warships, which includes working with others in small enclosed areas and a lack of private quarters for the vast majority of crew, lent themselves to the rapid spread of the disease to a degree even greater than that seen on cruise ships. Indeed, on Charles de Gaulle there were places where 20 people would sleep together on three or four floors of berths.

During this time, several common colds were registered on board, but the level of sick sailors was not above the ordinary for the frigid −5 °C (23 °F) temperature and strong winds of the region Charles de Gaulle was operating in. Starting on 5 April, however, the number of crew members reporting to the infirmary began growing exponentially to alarming levels. Two sailors were medically scanned and found to be infected by the coronavirus, after which the French defense minister Florence Parly ordered the carrier to return to its home port of Toulon. On 10 April, French news outlets reported that out of 66 tests conducted on board the aircraft carrier, 50 had returned positive. Three sailors were evacuated by air to Saint Anne Army Teaching Hospital. There were 1,760 personnel on board.

The carrier arrived in Toulon on the afternoon of 12 April, where the personnel began a 14-day quarantine. The ship was to be decontaminated over the course of several weeks.

At first, the origin of the outbreak was unknown; there had been no contact with the outside world after the ship's stopover in Brest. (Note: Between 13 and 16 March.) The captain had given the crew orders to avoid an infection and a family day had been cancelled. However, the girlfriend of a sailor said in an interview on Easter Sunday that some sailors had eaten in the same restaurants as their wives or families. She also said that sailors of other nationalities had been there, too. As of 18 April, Brest is considered the point of infection.

On 15 April 2020, the Ministry of Armed Forces reported that, out of the 1,767 tests conducted on the members of the carrier battle group, 668 returned positive, with the vast majority of cases being aboard Charles de Gaulle. (Note: 30% of the tests were still inconclusive.) The 1,700 sailors of Charles de Gaulle were subsequently quarantined for two weeks.

On 17 April, the numbers reported went up to more than 1,000 infected, from 2,000 tested, with 500 showing symptoms, 24 admitted to hospital and one of them to an intensive care unit (ICU).

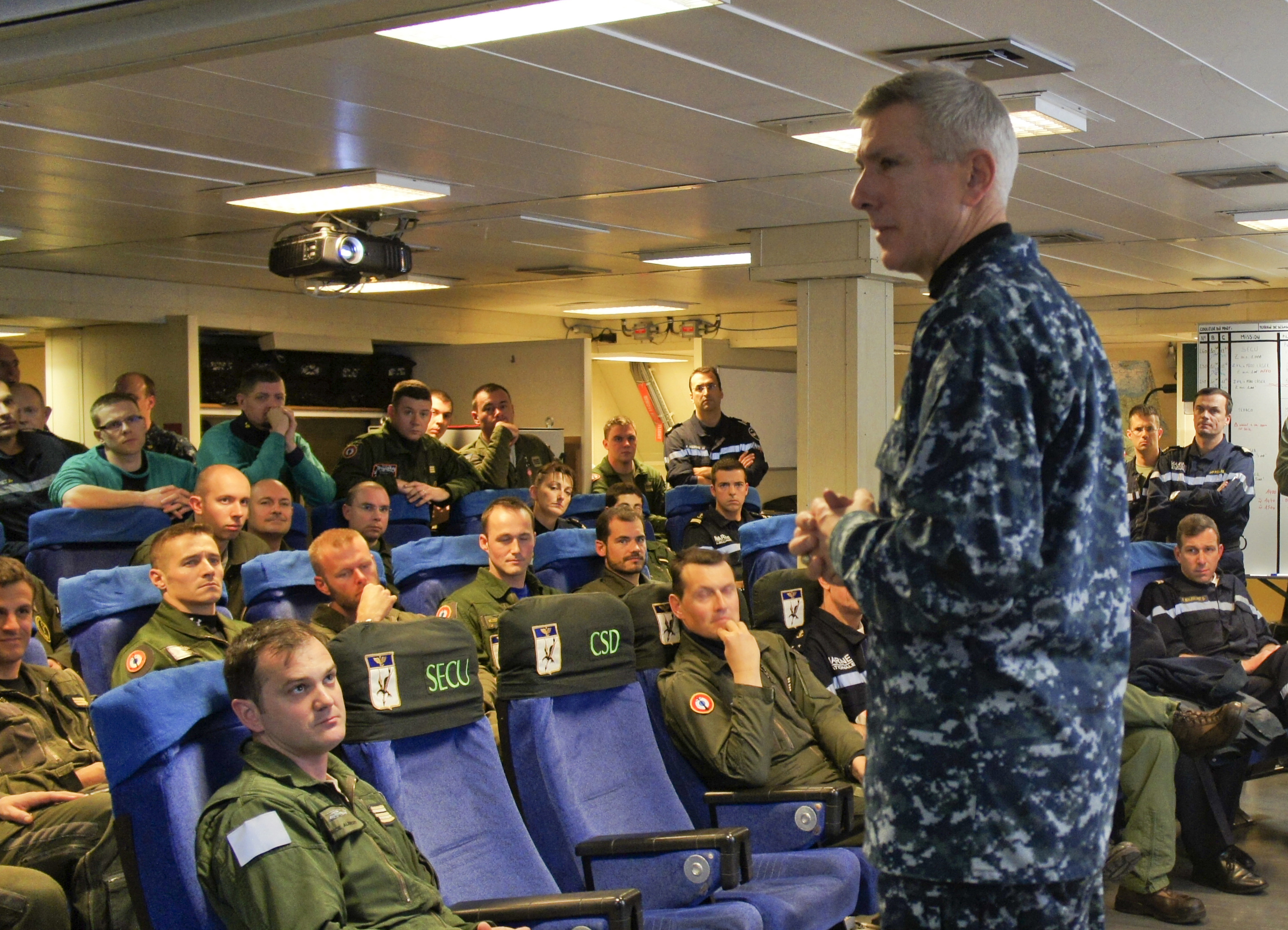
Admiral Samuel J. Locklear inside Charles de Gaulle (2011)

On 18 April, it was reported that 1,081 out of 2,300 people on both Charles de Gaulle and Chevalier Paul, tested positive. Two investigations have been launched. One on the situation in Brest and one led by admiral Christophe Prazuck on the epidemic on board of the carrier strike group.

Reports for 23 April state that about 15 people were still in hospital with three in intensive care.

By 11 May the number of hospitalized cases dropped to two, with one of them in intensive care. In total 20 sailors were still ill.

== Aftermath ==
Later analysis by physicians at the Military Instruction Hospital Sainte Anne in Toulon found that 60% of Charles de Gaulle's 1706 crewmembers were antibody-positive by the end of quarantine.

== See also ==
- COVID-19 pandemic on USS Theodore Roosevelt, a similar outbreak on an American aircraft carrier
- COVID-19 pandemic on naval ships
- COVID-19 pandemic in France
