= Brett Crozier =

United States Navy officer (born 1970)

Brett E. Crozier
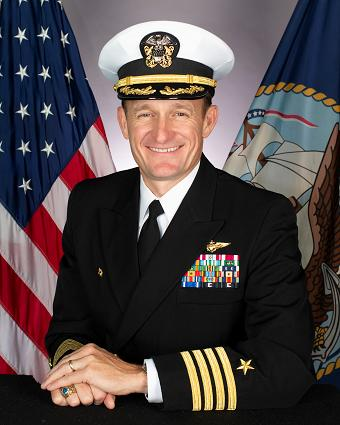
- Born: Brett Elliott Crozier; February 24, 1970 (age 56); Santa Rosa, California, U.S.
- Military career
- Allegiance: United States
- Branch: United States Navy
- Service years: 1992–2022
- Rank: Captain
- Commands: USS Theodore Roosevelt (CVN-71); USS Blue Ridge (LCC-19); VFA-94
- Conflicts: Iraq War
- Awards: Legion of Merit (3)

Brett Elliott Crozier (born 1970) is a retired captain in the United States Navy. A United States Naval Academy graduate, he became a naval aviator, first flying helicopters and then switching to fighters. After completing naval nuclear training, he served as an officer on several aircraft carriers. In spring 2020, he was commanding officer of the aircraft carrier USS Theodore Roosevelt when COVID-19 broke out among the crew. He was relieved of command by then-acting Secretary of the Navy Thomas Modly after sending a letter to Navy leaders asking that most of the crew be taken ashore which was subsequently leaked to the press. Crozier himself was also later diagnosed with the virus. He was reassigned to a shore position and retired in March 2022.

== Early life and education ==
Brett Elliott Crozier grew up in Santa Rosa, California. He graduated from Santa Rosa High School in 1988 and then entered the United States Naval Academy in Annapolis, Maryland. He graduated from the academy in 1992. He received his master's degree in National Security and Strategic Studies from the Naval War College in Newport, Rhode Island in 2007, and completed Nuclear Power School in Goose Creek, South Carolina in 2014.

== Naval career ==
Crozier was designated a naval aviator in 1994 and was assigned as a Sikorsky SH-60 Seahawk pilot to the squadron HSL-37 at Barbers Point, Hawaii. He deployed on board USS Crommelin and USS Fletcher for operations in the Pacific Ocean and Operation Southern Watch in the Persian Gulf.

In 1999, Crozier served in Navy Personnel Command as an aviation detailer and retention program manager. He then shifted to flying the F/A-18 Hornet. In 2002, he reported to Strike Fighter Squadron 97 (VFA-97), the "Warhawks"; the following year, the squadron deployed with USS Nimitz in support of Operation Iraqi Freedom (OIF).

In 2004, Crozier reported to Strike Fighter Squadron 94 (VFA-94), another F/A-18 Hornet unit known as the Mighty Shrikes, as a department head, and was again deployed with Nimitz in 2005. In 2006, Crozier was assigned to VFA-125, the "Rough Raiders," and served as an instructor and Fleet Replacement Squadron Operations Officer. The following year, he reported in 2007 to the Naval War College, where he earned a master's degree in National Security and Strategic Studies.

Crozier later served as the executive officer, then commanding officer (CO) of VFA-94, based at Naval Station Lemoore in California. As squadron CO, he made multiple deployments for U.S. Third, Fifth, and Seventh Fleet operations, numerous exercises and Operations Southern Watch and OIF. He led his squadron on expeditionary deployments with Marine Aircraft Group 12 from Marine Corps Air Station Iwakuni, Japan, to support Pacific operations and the Afghan and Iraq Wars. His squadron CO tour ended in August 2010.

Crozier then reported to Naval Striking and Support Forces NATO in Naples, Italy, and served as the lead air planner for Joint Task Force Odyssey Dawn and Combined Joint Task Force Deputy Director of Targeting for NATO's Operation Unified Protector, both in Libya.

From April 2014 until July 2016, Crozier completed the naval nuclear power training program and served as the executive officer of USS Ronald Reagan. During this tour, Ronald Reagan took part in RIMPAC 2014, two maintenance availabilities, a forward deployment to Yokosuka, Japan, to relieve USS George Washington as the U.S. Navy's only forward-deployed aircraft carrier, and several Forward Deployed Naval Force deployments in the United States Indo-Pacific Command area of responsibility. From June 2017 to November 2018, he commanded the amphibious command ship USS Blue Ridge while the ship completed an extensive dry-dock refit and then returned to operations at sea. He was assigned command of the nuclear aircraft carrier USS Theodore Roosevelt on November 1, 2019.

=== COVID-19 outbreak onboard Theodore Roosevelt ===
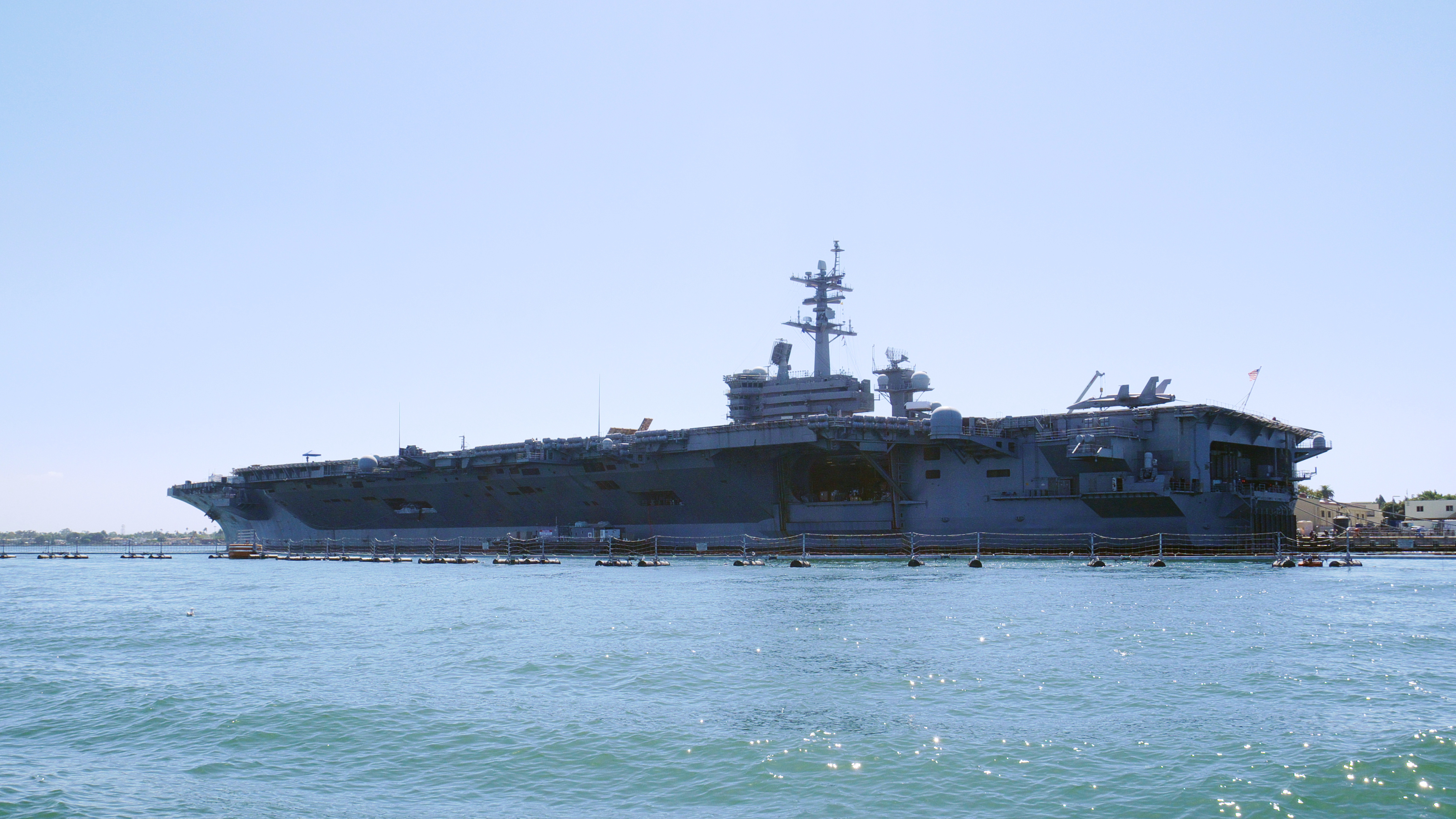
USS Theodore Roosevelt in October 2019, one month before Crozier took command of the vessel

External videos
- U.S. Department of Defense briefing with Navy Secretary Modly in which he announces the relief of Capt. Crozier from his duty as the captain of the Theodore Roosevelt, April 2, 2020, C-SPAN

Crozier was captain of Theodore Roosevelt, then deployed in the Pacific, on March 24, 2020, when three members of the crew tested positive for COVID-19. The next day, eight sailors were infected, and within a few days it was "dozens." The sailors became ill after more than two weeks at sea. (Note: The initial source of the outbreak aboard the ship has not been definitively established. Beginning on March 5, the Theodore Roosevelt began a scheduled four-day port call in Da Nang, Vietnam, after Philip S. Davidson, the commander of the U.S. Indo-Pacific Command, ordered the visit to proceed. An April 15, 2020, New York Times article reported that "Navy officials publicly say they are not sure how the virus got aboard the ship, but privately acknowledge that it almost certainly happened during the port call." However, the Navy subsequently said that the virus may have been first spread to the carrier by flight crews—either the Carrier Air Wing Eleven (CVW-11) or the Fleet Logistics Support Squadron 30 (VRC-30), which made carrier onboard delivery (COD) supply flights.) The initial cases were airlifted to a military hospital. Theodore Roosevelt was ordered to Guam, where she docked on March 27, and all 4,865 aboard were ordered to be tested for the virus. About 100 affected sailors were offloaded, and the rest of the crew remained on board. Crozier wanted to have most of the crew immediately taken ashore, saying it was impossible to prevent the spread of the virus in the close quarters of the ship. However, his superior, Rear Admiral Stuart P. Baker, believed that to be impractical and too drastic.

On March 30, Crozier emailed a four-page memorandum to ten Naval officers. Three were admirals in his chain of command, including his immediate commander Rear Admiral Baker, Admiral John Aquilino, the commander of the Pacific Fleet, and Vice Admiral DeWolfe Miller III, commander of naval air forces in the Pacific. Crozier copied the message to seven other captains, five of whom were on board the Roosevelt and two who were executive assistants to the admirals. Crozier did not email Vice Admiral William R. Merz, who was higher than Baker in Crozier's chain of command. In the memorandum, Crozier pleaded for authorization to have most of the crew evacuated and quarantined ashore, citing the impossibility of following CDC recommendations on social distancing and quarantine procedures on the Roosevelt, a ship more crowded than the cruise ship Diamond Princess infected earlier. On March 31, the letter was leaked to the San Francisco Chronicle, which published it. On April 1, the Navy ordered the aircraft carrier evacuated, with a skeleton crew to remain aboard to maintain the nuclear reactors, the fire-fighting equipment, and the galley.

On April 2, 2020, Crozier was relieved of command by acting Secretary of the Navy Thomas Modly. At the time of his removal, 114 of 4,865 crew members had tested positive for the coronavirus. As he disembarked, sailors cheered him and chanted his name; videos of the scene were posted to Twitter and subsequently picked up by major news organizations.

=== After being relieved of command ===
Crozier himself reportedly began showing symptoms of coronavirus before he was relieved, according to two of his Naval Academy classmates. He was placed in quarantine in Guam. Crozier was replaced by the interim commander Captain Carlos A. Sardiello.

At a Pentagon news conference on April 3, Modly said that Crozier had "raised alarm bells unnecessarily" and showed "extremely poor judgment." Modly mischaracterized the distribution list of the memorandum, inaccurately claiming that Crozier had copied 20 to 30 other people; Crozier in fact sent the memo to ten officers.

In an April 4 interview with radio host Hugh Hewitt, Modly criticized Crozier's decision to send the letter to what he characterized as "a large list of other people," adding "And that, to me, just represented just extremely poor judgment, because once you do that in this digital era, you know that there is no way that you can control where that information's going to go."

A joint statement from four Democrats on the House Armed Services Committee, including the committee chair, Representative Adam Smith of Washington, said that Crozier "did not handle the immense pressure appropriately" but that he "was justifiably concerned about the health and safety of his crew" and "relieving him of his command is an overreaction." President Donald Trump criticized Crozier's letter on April 4, saying "I thought it was terrible, what he did, to write a letter. This isn't a class on literature. This is a captain of a massive ship that's nuclear-powered." Joe Biden criticized Crozier's dismissal, saying: "I think it's close to criminal, the way they're dealing with this guy. ... he should have a commendation, rather than be fired."

Modly, Defense Secretary Mark Esper, and Chief of Naval Operations Admiral Michael Gilday each defended the decision to remove Crozier, although Gilday and General Mark A. Milley, the chairman of the Joint Chiefs of Staff, had each advised Modly not to proceed until a Navy investigation into the matter had been completed. Modly said that there was no White House pressure when the decision was made to remove Crozier. On April 6, Modly visited the ship in person and made a speech to the crew over the ship's public address system. In it, he excoriated Crozier, saying he was "too naïve or too stupid to be a commanding officer" if he did not realize that the letter would be leaked to the media. An audio recording and transcript of Modly's speech was leaked to the media within hours. Later that day, Modly apologized for the comment. The following day, he resigned his position.

The Navy conducted an internal preliminary investigation into the Theodore Roosevelt affair, conducted by Admiral Robert P. Burke, the Vice Chief of Naval Operations. The investigation centered on the circumstances surrounding Crozier's firing and whether "a breakdown in communications" had taken place. The investigation did not examine why the Theodore Roosevelt went ahead with the scheduled four-day port call in Da Nang, Vietnam, beginning on March 5, despite reported coronavirus cases in the country at that time, a decision that Navy officials defended.

One crew member, Chief Petty Officer Charles Robert Thacker Jr., died of the virus on April 13.

The findings of the Navy's preliminary investigation went to Gilday, and on April 15, it was reported that Gilday was considering reinstating Crozier as captain of the Theodore Roosevelt. Gilday confirmed that he was not ruling out reinstatement. A reinstatement of a dismissed captain would be unprecedented in the Navy.

By April 17, 94% of the Theodore Roosevelt's crew had been tested for COVID-19, with 660 sailors testing positive for the virus, an infection rate greater than 14%. Of the sailors who tested positive, some 60% were asymptomatic, suggesting a high level of "stealth transmission" of the virus. The Theodore Roosevelt returned to sea on May 21, after being sidelined for nearly two months in Guam.

After the initial inquiry Gilday and the acting Secretary of the Navy, James E. McPherson, recommended on April 24 that Crozier be reinstated as captain of the Theodore Roosevelt. However, Defense Secretary Esper delayed a decision pending a "deeper review" of the situation. In the interim, Crozier was reassigned to San Diego, where he served as the special assistant to the Naval Air Forces chief of staff.

A second Navy inquiry, whose results were announced on June 19, concluded that Crozier and Baker made poor decisions regarding the coronavirus outbreak, so that Crozier would not be restored to command of the ship, and Baker's scheduled promotion would be put on hold. The remotely conducted investigation criticized Crozier for his planning of how to move sailors off the ship, waiting for hotel rooms to open up instead of fully using available base facilities, and not strictly following social distancing rules onboard a densely crewed ship. Democratic senators Richard Blumenthal and Chris Van Hollen questioned the conclusion, saying that the Navy was retroactively applying current anti-COVID-19 best practices to a situation at the start of the pandemic to justify the dismissal.

Crozier retired from the Navy in March 2022. He lives in California, and is currently the chief executive officer of LTA Research developing next generation airships.

== Honors, awards, and decorations ==

Naval Aviator Badge
Legion of Merit w/ 2 gold award star	Defense Meritorious Service Medal w/ 1 bronze oak leaf cluster	Meritorious Service Medal
Air Medal	Joint Service Commendation Medal	Navy and Marine Corps Commendation Medal w/ 2 award stars
Navy and Marine Corps Achievement Medal w/ award star	Navy Meritorious Unit Commendation	Navy E Ribbon w/ 2 Battle E devices
National Defense Service Medal w/ 1 bronze service star	Armed Forces Expeditionary Medal	Iraq Campaign Medal w/ 1 service star
Global War on Terrorism Expeditionary Medal	Navy Sea Service Deployment Ribbon w/ 3 service stars	Navy & Marine Corps Overseas Service Ribbon
NATO Medal for the former Yugoslavia	Navy Expert Rifle Medal	Navy Expert Pistol Shot Medal

== Book ==
External videos
- Presentation by Crozier on Surf When You Can, June 20, 2023, C-SPAN

In 2023, Crozier wrote a memoir, Surf When You Can: Lessons in Life, Loyalty, and Leadership from a Maverick Navy Captain, in which he describes how surfing has helped him balance his life. He told Joe Garofoli of the San Francisco Chronicle: "The more time I've spent with family, friends—things outside of work—the better I could focus and the better I could perform at work."

Crozier also spoke to a video interview with Navy Times, discussing the book and his time in the Navy. Crozier has been interviewed by several media outlets.

== See also ==
- Round-Robin Letter (Spanish–American War)
- Li Wenliang, Chinese doctor who first raised the alarm in regards to the early COVID-19 cases and was reprimanded by authorities.
- Chris Smalls, a worker fired by Amazon after raising the alarm about the pandemic conditions at the JFK8 warehouse.
