= COVID-19 pandemic on naval ships =

Aspect of viral disease pandemic

The COVID-19 pandemic spread to many military ships. The nature of these ships, which includes working with others in small enclosed areas and a lack of private quarters for the vast majority of crew, contributed to the rapid spread of the disease, even more so than on cruise ships.

Due to the nature of operations security, national militaries may have policies in place that prevent or restrict reporting of SARS-CoV-2 infections and COVID-19 deaths, so although the cases listed below may have been widely reported in reliable sources, confirmation by official spokespeople of the respective militaries is not systematic.

== Summary of confirmed cases ==
Military ship incidents with confirmed positive cases
§	Ship	Crew	Tests	Cases (Note: As reports may not be clear on whether crew members who tested positive had been on the ship while sick, this number includes all crew members assigned to the ship regardless of whether they had been on the ship while sick, and a footnote is added if one or more crew members were reported to not have been on the ship at the time.)	Dead	Docking date	Docking location	
§	Ship	Crew	Tests	Cases	Dead	Docking date	Dock	Country
§	(United States) USS Boxer			2		none (Note: Ship was already docked at home port.)	Naval Base San Diego (Note: San Diego, California)	US
§	(United States) USS Essex			≥3 (Note: The first reported case was a sailor who had been attending a course at Naval Base San Diego since 6 February 2020 when the test returned positive on 14 March. It was later acknowledged that there were also coronavirus cases on board.)				
§	(United States) USS Ralph Johnson			1		none	Naval Station Everett (Note: Everett, Washington)	USA
§	(United States) USS Coronado	~60		9		none	Naval Base San Diego	USA
§	(United States) USS Carl Vinson			1		none (Note: Ship was already docked at home port for maintenance.)	Puget Sound Naval Shipyard (Note: Bremerton, Washington)	USA
§	(United States) USS Theodore Roosevelt	5000	5000	1156 (Note: As of 30 April 2020, 1102 crew members had active cases, 53 had recovered, and 1 had died. All results of initial testing is complete. In addition, the Navy had reported 840 positive cases on 23 April 2020 and 856 positive cases on 24 April 2020, but 833 positive cases on 25 April 2020.)	1	27 March 2020	Guam	USA
§	(Belgium) Leopold I			1 (Note: The crew member had been evacuated via air on 20 March after he began showing symptoms, and was quarantined at home when the test returned positive on 24 March.)		27 March 2020	Zeebrugge	Belgium
§	(United States) USS Ronald Reagan			16		none	Yokosuka Naval Base (Note: Yokosuka)	Japan
§	(Netherlands) HNLMS Dolfijn	58	15	8		3 April 2020	Den Helder	Netherlands
§	(United States) USNS Comfort			2		none (Note: Ship was already docked to carry out its mission.)	Pier 90 (Note: Manhattan, New York City)	USA
§	(United States) USS Nimitz			2 (Note: One crew member who tested positive was reported to not have been working on the ship.)		none (Note: Ship was already docked at home port prior to deployment.)	Puget Sound Naval Shipyard	USA
§	(United States) USNS Mercy			7		none	Port of Los Angeles (Note: San Pedro, Los Angeles, California)	USA
§	(France) Charles de Gaulle (France) Chevalier Paul (Note: These two ships were reported to have positive cases, but it is unclear if any other ships of the carrier battle group also had positive cases, or if any of the soldiers assigned to the carrier air wing are counted separately from the carrier itself.)	1760; 200	≥2010 (Note: One government source states 2,010 while another states 2,300.)	1046 ≥35 (Note: Initially, the carrier group was reported to have 1081 positive cases with some results inconclusive, but it was later reported that 1046 positive cases is the final number for those on board Charles de Gaulle.)		12 April 2020	Arsenal de Toulon	France
§	(United States) USS Tripoli	≥630		~24 (Note: A source stated that "the outbreak was limited to around a couple dozen sailors.")		none (Note: Ship was already docked at shipyard where it was built.)	Pascagoula	USA
§	(Taiwan) ROCS Pan Shi	337	337 (Note: All 744 members of the fleet were tested.)	31		15 April 2020 (Note: One source mentions that the fleet actually returned to the base on 9 April 2020, and the soldiers were placed in isolation for six days before they were allowed to disembark on 15 April. It is unclear whether the ship docked before, during, or after the isolation period.)	Zuoying Naval Base	Taiwan
§	(United States) USS Kidd	~330	~330	≥96		28 April 2020	Naval Base San Diego	USA
§	(United States) USNS Leroy Grumman	~50		52 (Note: This includes 22 crew members and 30 contractors.)	2 (Note: This includes one civilian mariner and one contractor.)	none (Note: Ship was already docked for maintenance.)	Boston	USA
§	(United States) USS Carter Hall	~400	100%	≥2		none	JEBLCFS	USA
§	(Philippines) BRP Jose Rizal	65		3 (Note: One case was reported on 16 June 2020 and two cases were reported on 19 July 2020, while there was no mention of either of the latter cases belonging to the same person as that of the former case.)		15 June 2020 (Note: Testing conducted prior to its docking date. Ship stayed at the anchorage area in Subic Bay from 23 May to 15 June.)	Port of Subic Bay	Philippines
§	(United States) USS San Diego			5		none	Naval Base San Diego	USA
§	(United States) USS George H.W. Bush			≥1		none	Norfolk Naval Shipyard	USA

== Belgium ==
=== Leopold I ===
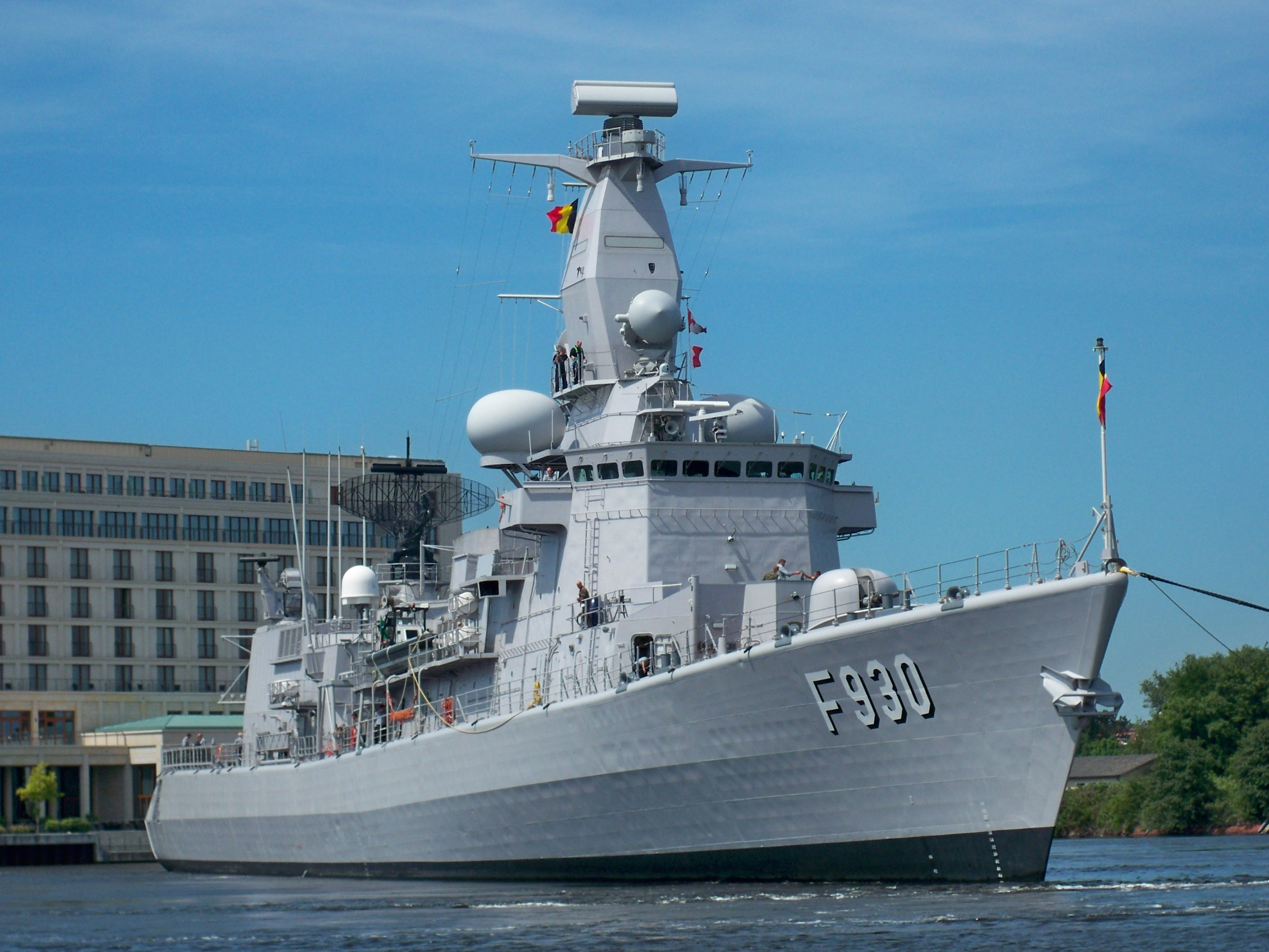
Leopold I in 2014

On 25 March, Belgian Defense reported that a crew member of the Belgian frigate Leopold I had tested positive. The sailor had been evacuated via air to Den Helder on 20 March after he began showing symptoms, and was quarantined at home when the test returned positive on 24 March. As a precaution, the ship broke off from its operation with the French carrier battle group led by Charles de Gaulle and returned to Zeebrugge, its home port, on 27 March, about a month earlier than planned.

== France ==
=== Carrier battle group of Charles de Gaulle ===
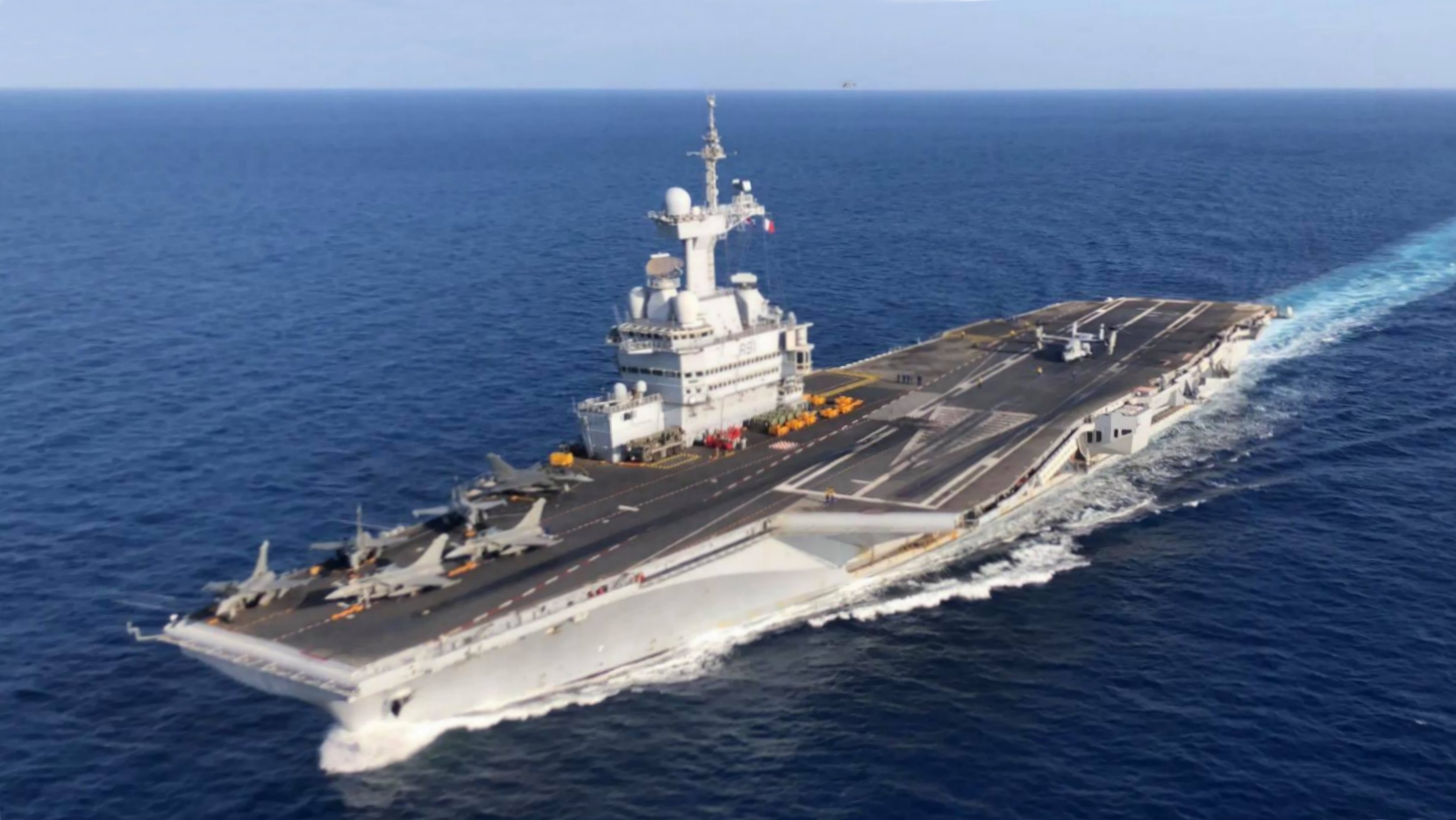
Charles de Gaulle on 24 April 2019

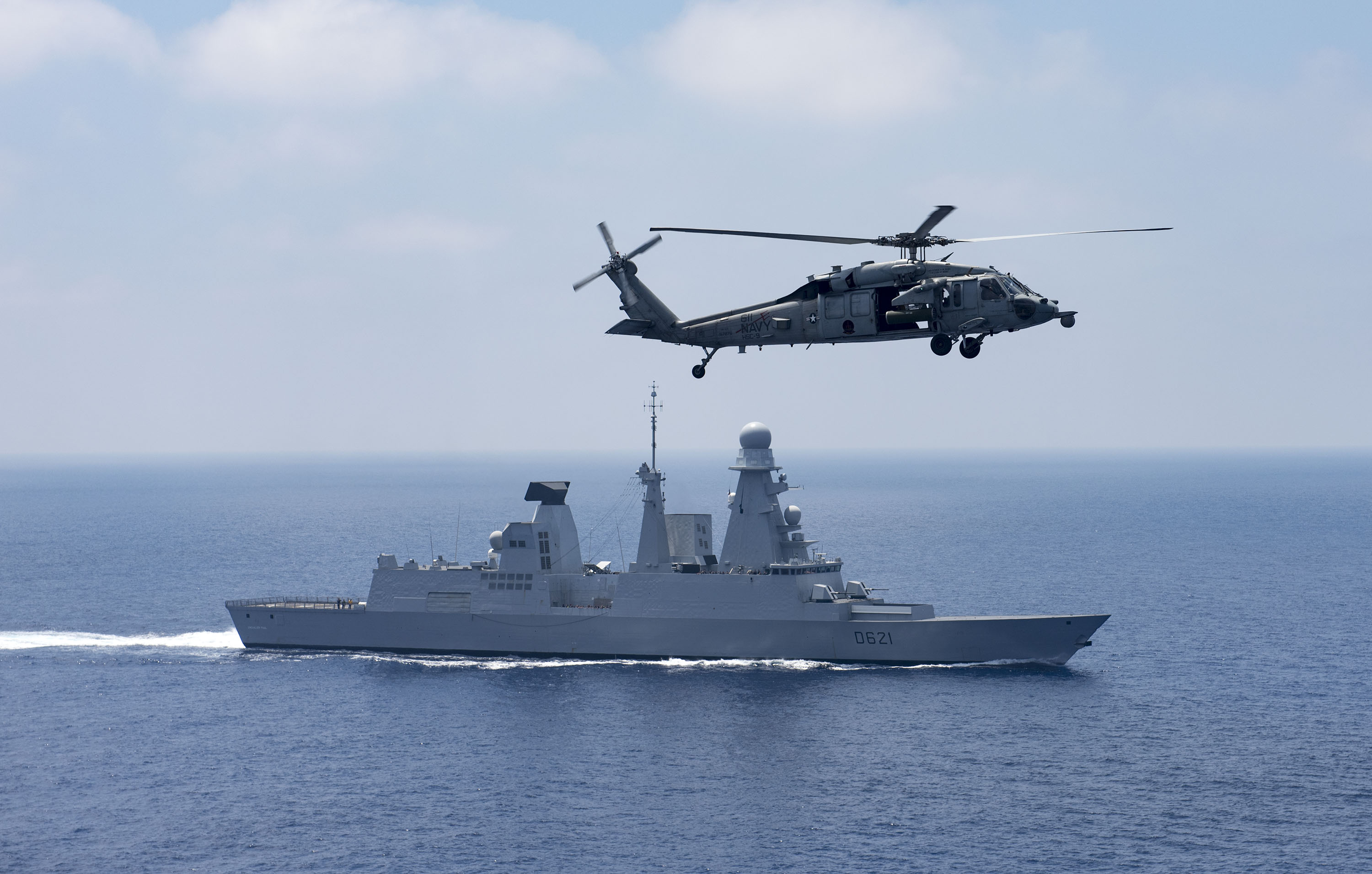
Chevalier Paul on 15 July 2017

Because about 40 crew members were beginning to show symptoms, the French aircraft carrier Charles de Gaulle returned to its home port in Toulon earlier than planned, as reported on 8 April 2020 by the Ministry of Armed Forces. Other ships that were part of the carrier battle group also began to return to their home ports.

After 66 sailors aboard Charles de Gaulle were tested, the ministry announced on 10 April that 50 tests had returned positive. Three sailors were evacuated by air to Saint Anne Army Teaching Hospital.

The carrier had been on a months-long mission leading a carrier battle group when its first coronavirus case was reported. Another ship participating in the mission, Belgium's Leopold I, had broken off to return to port weeks earlier due to a case of coronavirus being found on board.

On 12 April 2020, the Marine Nationale reported that Charles de Gaulle and accompanying air-defense frigate Chevalier Paul had returned to Toulon, while command and replenishment tanker Somme and anti-submarine frigate La Motte-Picquet had returned to Brest. The 1,700 sailors of Charles de Gaulle and 200 sailors of Chevalier Paul were subsequently quarantined for two weeks.

On 15 April, the Ministry of Armed Forces reported that, out of the 1,767 tests that had been conducted on the members of the carrier battle group so far, 668 had returned positive. (Note: 30% of the tests were still inconclusive at the time.) The vast majority of these cases were aboard Charles de Gaulle, and the remainder of the cases were reported to be aboard Chevalier Paul.

On 17 April, Maryline Gygax Généro, Central Director of the Military Health Service, reported to the Senate Foreign Affairs, Defense, and Armed Forces Committee that all 2,300 sailors of the carrier battle group had been tested upon their return to Toulon, and so far, 940 had tested positive while 645 had tested negative. (Note: Her exact words were "Sur les 2300 marins du groupe aéronaval autour du porte-avions Charles de Gaulle, tous testés à leur retour à Toulon, 940 ont été testés positifs, 645 négatifs, les autres résultats de tests n'étant pas encore connus".) On the same day, Florence Parly, Minister of the Armed Forces, reported to the National Assembly's National Defense and Armed Forces Committee that 2,010 sailors of the carrier battle group had been tested, with 1,081 tests returning positive so far. The Navy clarified that, on Charles de Gaulle itself, the final number was 1,046 positive cases out of 1,760 tested.

In total, 545 sailors had shown symptoms and 24 had been hospitalized at the Saint Anne Army Teaching Hospital, including 2 admitted to the ICU.

On 29 April 2020, the Navy stated that 19 sailors aboard Chevalier Paul had tested positive upon arrival at Toulon.

On 11 May 2020, Florence Parly reported to the National Assembly the conclusions of two investigations (Note: One investigation was epidemiological, while the other was of command.) into the outbreak on board the carrier, stating that the virus had first arrived before a stopover made in Brest, and that although the command and medical team aboard the carrier had "excessive confidence" (Note: The original words were "confiance excessive".) in their ability to deal with the virus, the investigations did not consider them at fault.

Parly further explained that the introduction of the virus on board the carrier happened sometime between when it left Limassol, Cyprus, on 26 February 2020, and when it arrived at Brest on 13 March 2020. During this time, personnel had been brought on board via air from either Cyprus, Sicily, the Balearic Islands, Spain, or Portugal. The spread of the virus, however, was exacerbated by the stopover at Brest. Social distancing and other measures were taken after the stopover, but they weighed heavily on crew morale, so after enforcing the strict measures for a fortnight, they were relaxed, and a concert on board was authorized for 30 March.

Parly also noted that all soldiers aboard Charles de Gaulle have since recovered from the disease except for one sailor, who was still hospitalized after leaving the ICU.

== Netherlands ==
HNLMS Dolfijn in 2013

=== HNLMS Dolfijn ===
On 30 March 2020, the Ministry of Defence reported that eight crew members of the Dutch submarine HNLMS Dolfijn had tested positive. Out of 58 crew members, 15 sailors with mild symptoms were tested. The submarine changed course near Scotland to return to the Netherlands two weeks early, arriving in Den Helder on 3 April.

== Philippines ==
=== BRP Jose Rizal ===
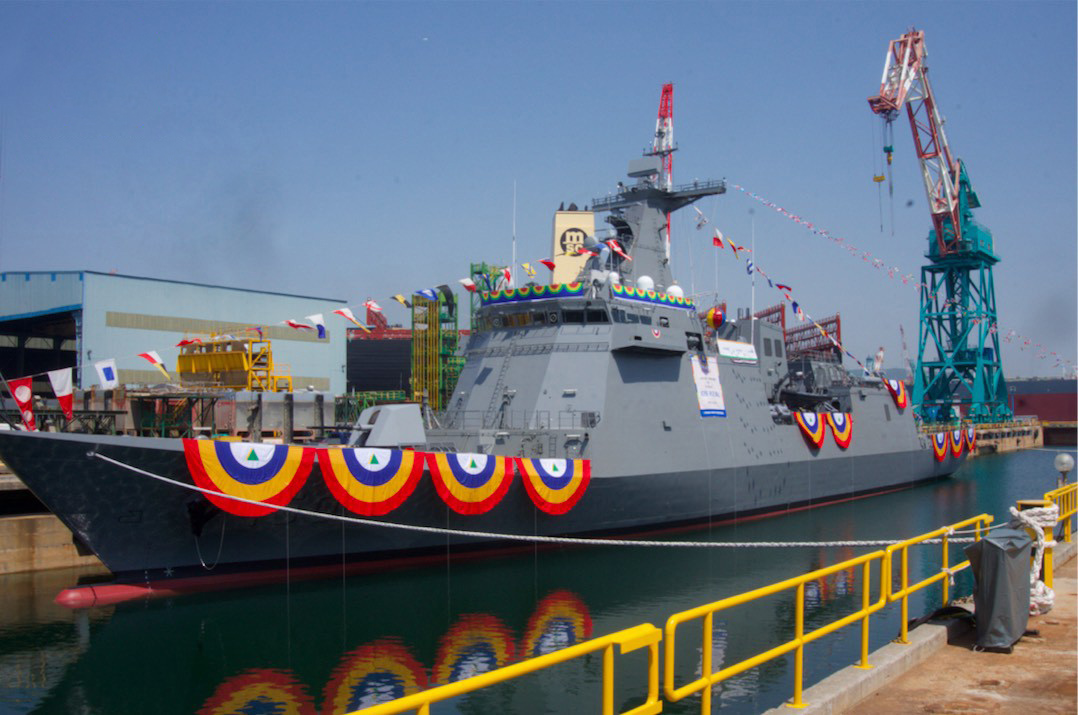
BRP Jose Rizal in 2019

On 16 June 2020, Navy Chief Vice admiral Giovanni Bacordo announced that one of the 65 crew members of the Philippine Navy missile frigate BRP Jose Rizal tested positive for COVID-19, causing the postponement of the ship's commissioning. (Note: The sailor was tested on 4 June 2020.) The frigate had sailed from Hyundai Heavy Industries' shipyard in Ulsan, South Korea with its crew on 18 May. It had arrived at the Subic Bay anchorage area on 23 May and remained there to fulfill mandatory quarantine and swab testing requirements. The ship docked at the Port of Subic Bay in Zambales on 15 June but the whole crew had to undergo 14 days of additional quarantine from the time the ship's sole case tested positive. The ship was eventually commissioned on 10 July in a ceremony that was remotely attended by President Rodrigo Duterte.

On 19 July 2020, the Philippine News Agency reported that, following the commissioning ceremony, two crew members of BRP Jose Rizal had tested positive for the virus and had been evacuated to a quarantine facility on shore.

== Taiwan ==
=== ROCS Pan Shi ===
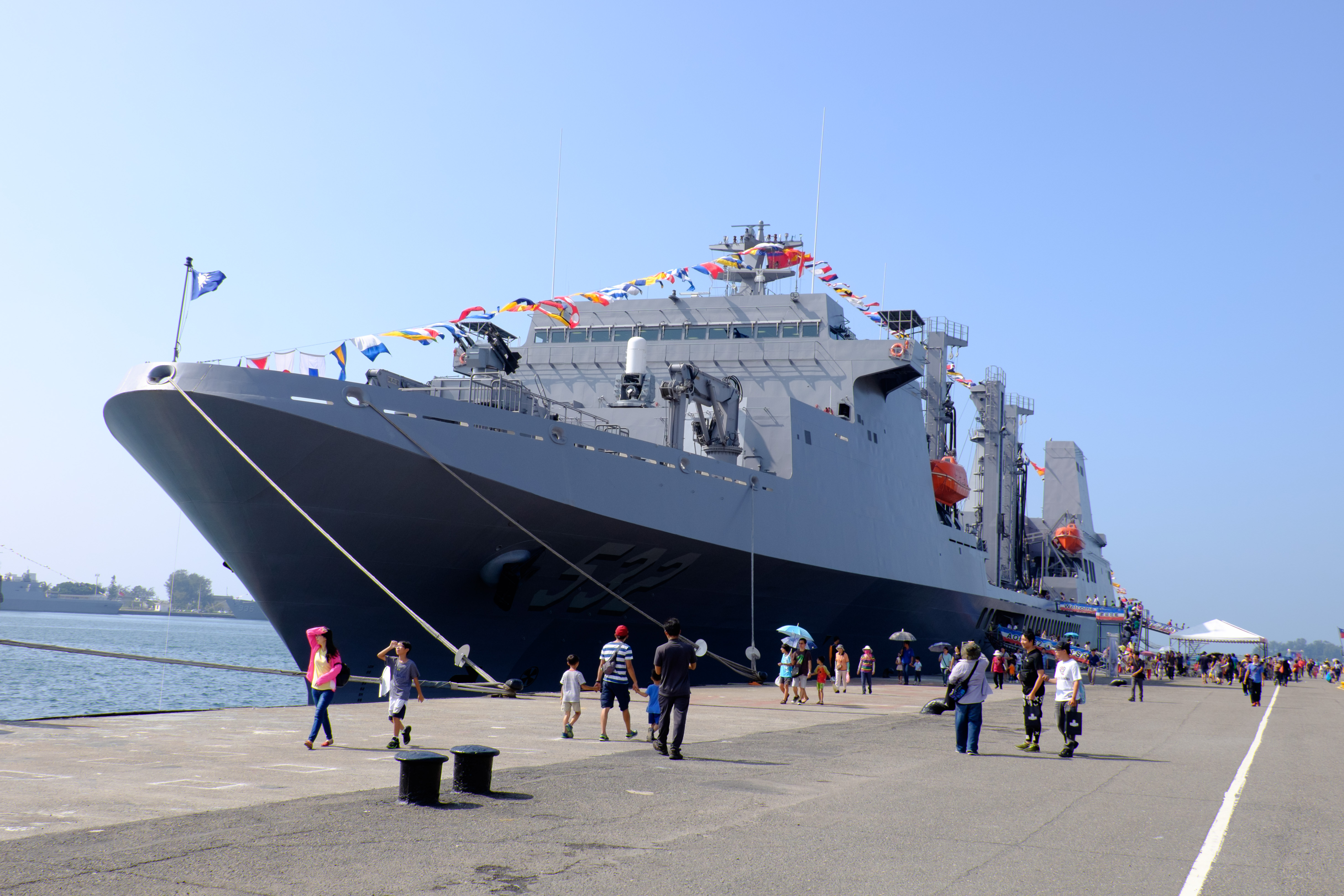
ROCS Pan Shi in 2015

On 18 April 2020, Minister of Health and Welfare Chen Shih-chung reported that three Republic of China Navy cadets, interning on one of the ships of the Dunmu fleet, had tested positive for coronavirus. (Note: Taiwan has numbered them Cases 396, 397, and 398.) All three cadets were in their 20s, with one case showing symptoms as early as 12 April before seeking medical attention on 15 April, when the ship returned to Taiwan. There were 337 people aboard the same ship as the cadets. Over 700 sailors serving in the three-ship fleet have been placed in quarantine.

A Dunmu fleet is formed annually, and this iteration of the Dunmu fleet was formed on 20 February 2020 consisting of the following three ships:

- ROCS Pan Shi (磐石), a fast combat support ship and the flagship of the fleet,
- ROCS Yueh Fei, a frigate, and
- ROCS Kang Ding, a frigate.

The three cadets had boarded the ship on 21 February, and the fleet left Zuoying Naval Base on 5 March 2020 for a goodwill visit with Palau. The fleet stayed at Palau from 12 to 15 March 2020, although the size restrictions at the port in Palau meant that only Kang Ding entered the port. After departing Palau, the fleet remained at sea for roughly a month before returning to Zuoying Naval Base on 15 April.

On 19 April, Taiwan announced that a further 21 sailors of the Dunmu fleet had tested positive. More cases from Pan Shi continued to be identified, eventually reaching a total of 36. On 26 May, Chang Shan-chwen, an adviser to the Central Epidemic Command Center, stated that the index case on the Pan Shi was likely to have been infected in Taiwan.

The goodwill mission has been criticized for pictures of sailors not wearing masks appearing on social media. Vice Admiral Mei Chia-shu, Navy Deputy Commander, stated that as Palau had no reported cases of coronavirus at the time, such a decision was made after consulting with Taiwan's embassy in Palau.

== United States ==
On 23 April 2020, the United States Navy reported that at least one coronavirus case had been found on 26 of its battle force ships. In addition, on 28 April 2020, the Navy reported that "[o]f the more than 90 U.S. Navy ships at sea around the world today, none have active COVID-19 cases". (Note: Although, at the time of the statement, USS Theodore Roosevelt and USS Kidd had active cases, neither were at sea, with the former docked at Guam, and the latter at San Diego.)

=== USS Boxer ===
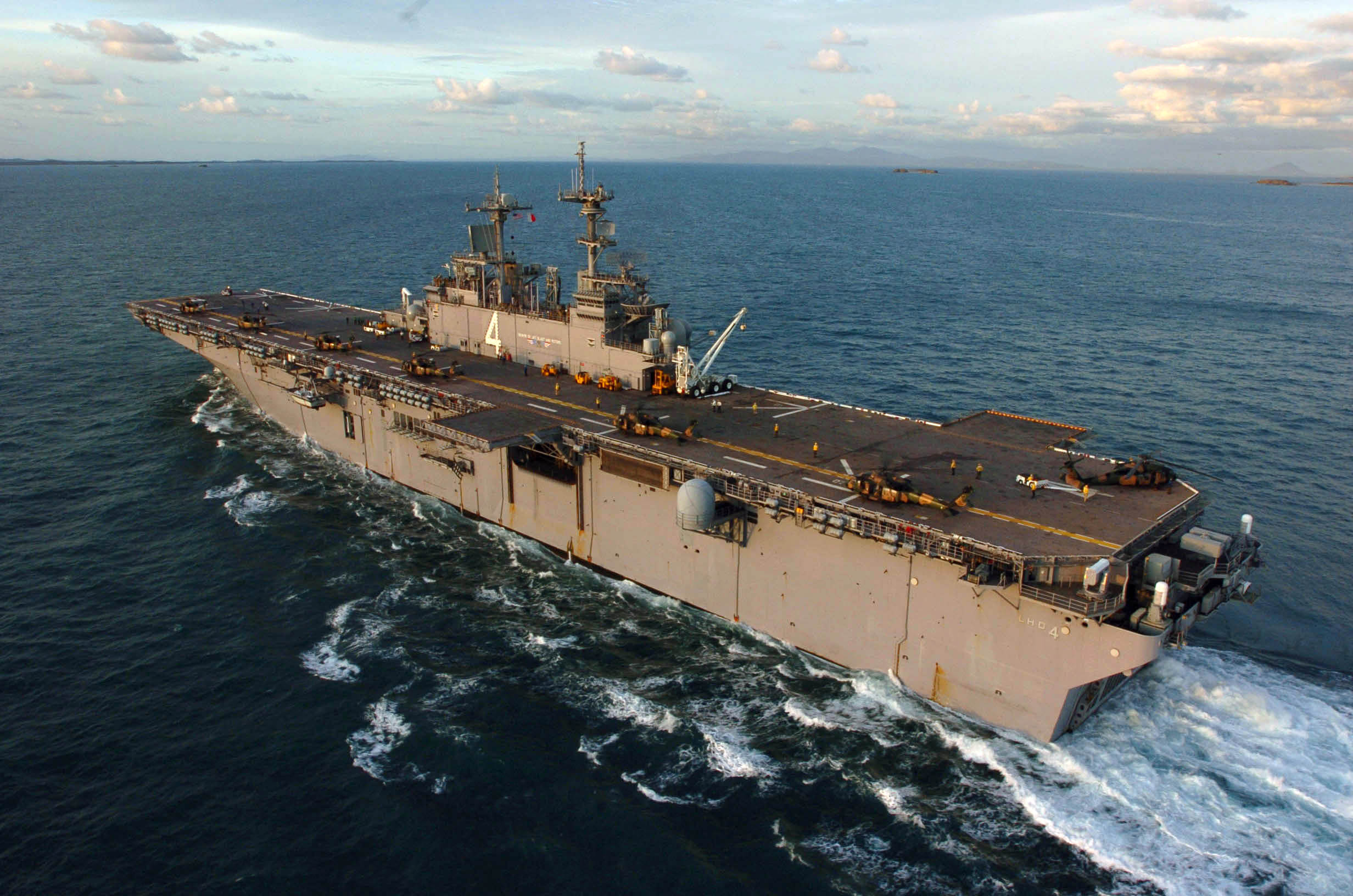
USS Boxer in 2005

The coronavirus pandemic was reported to have spread to the American amphibious assault ship USS Boxer when its first presumptive positive case was reported on 15 March 2020. This was reported as the first case for a sailor aboard a United States Navy ship. The sailor subsequently quarantined at home. A second sailor tested positive on 17 March 2020 and also quarantined at home.

=== USS Essex ===
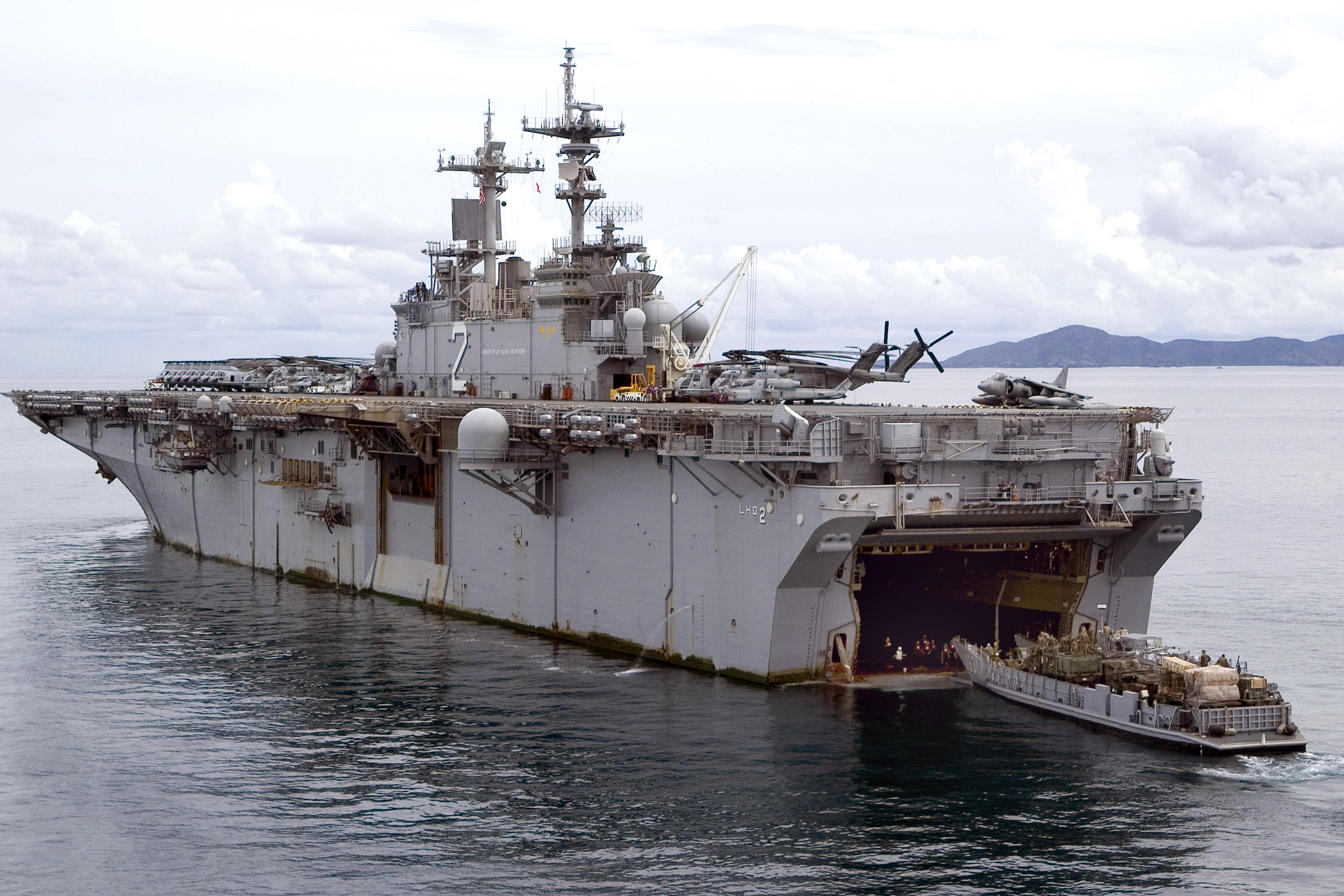
USS Essex in 2008

The coronavirus pandemic was reported to have spread to the crew of the American landing helicopter dock USS Essex when its first case was reported on 17 March. The sailor had been attending a course at Naval Base San Diego since 6 February 2020 when the test returned positive on 14 March. The student subsequently self-isolated at home.

=== USS Ralph Johnson ===
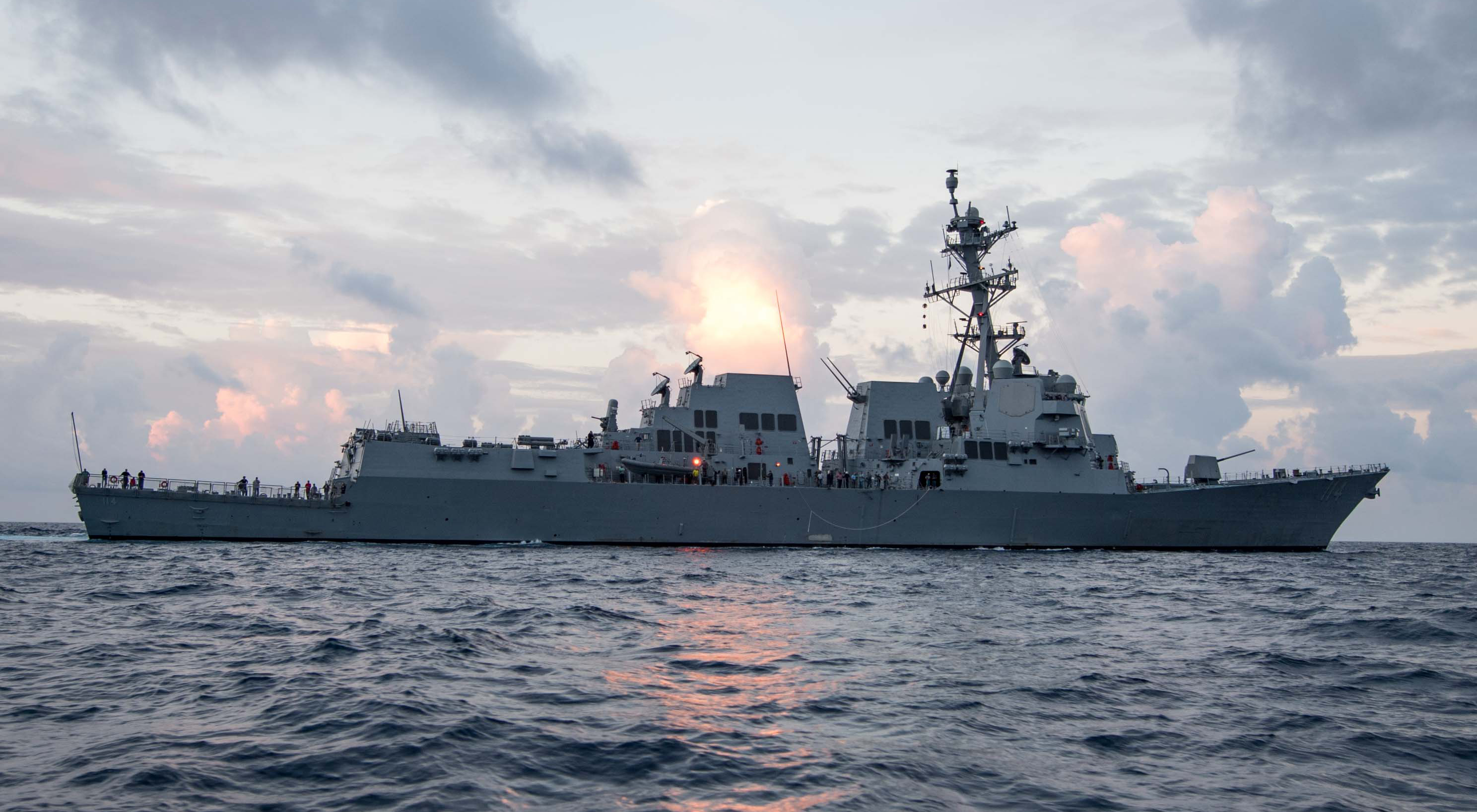
USS Ralph Johnson in 2017

On 17 March 2020, United States Pacific Fleet reported that a crew member of the American destroyer USS Ralph Johnson had tested positive the previous day. USS Ralph Johnson was at its home port in Everett, Washington at the time, and the sailor self-isolated at home.

=== USS Coronado ===
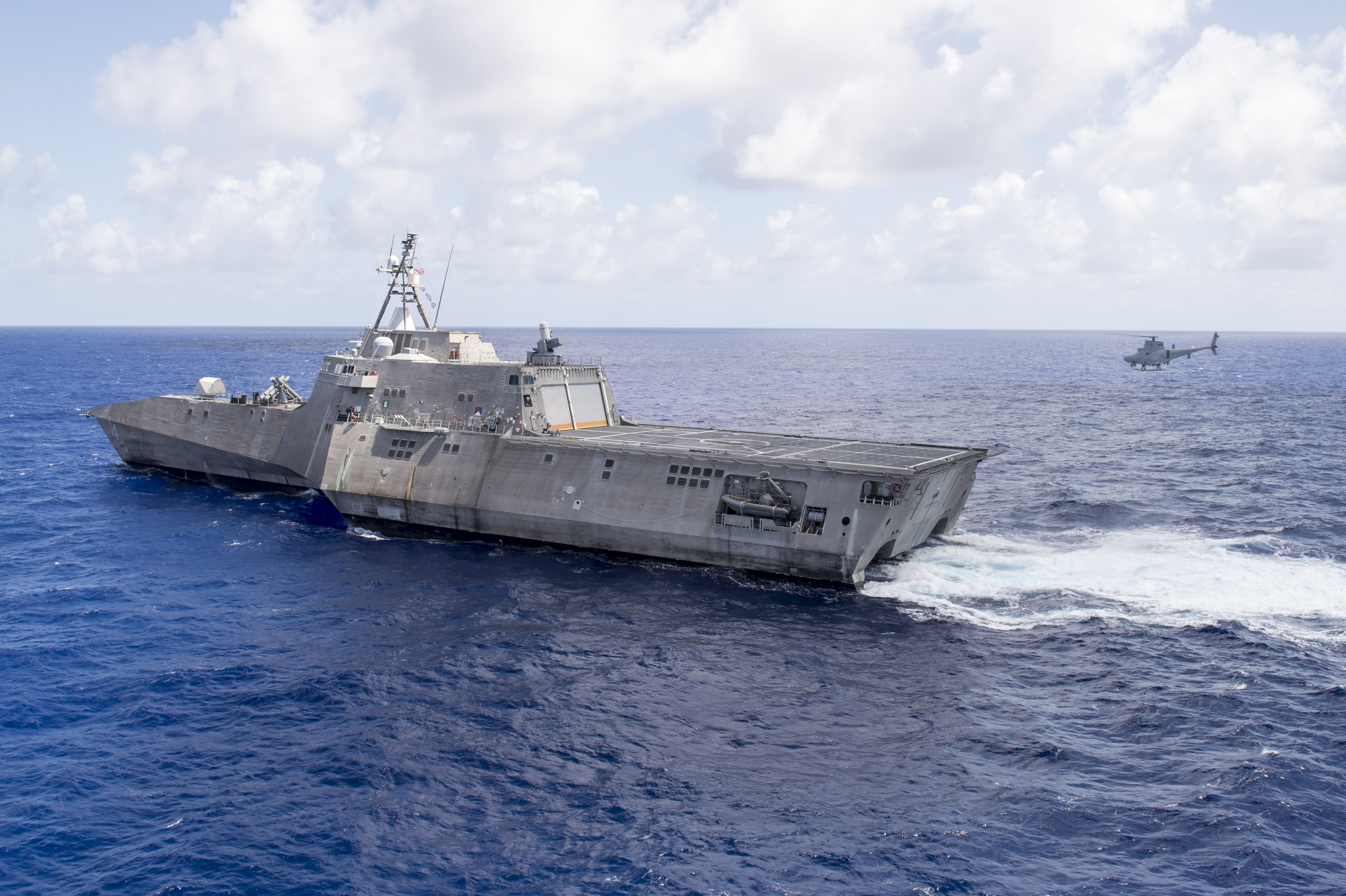
USS Coronado in 2016

On 17 March 2020, United States Pacific Fleet reported that a crew member of the American littoral combat ship USS Coronado had tested positive that day. USS Coronado was at its home port in San Diego, California at the time, and the sailor self-isolated at home.

By 26 March 2020, nine sailors had tested positive, and more than thirty sailors, or roughly half of the crew, had their movements restricted.

=== USS Carl Vinson ===
The coronavirus pandemic was reported to have spread to the crew of the American aircraft carrier USS Carl Vinson when its first case was reported on 23 March 2020. At the time, the ship was in dry dock at Puget Sound Naval Shipyard, and it was reported that "the sailor did not board the vessel and had no contact with any shipyard personnel".

=== USS Theodore Roosevelt ===
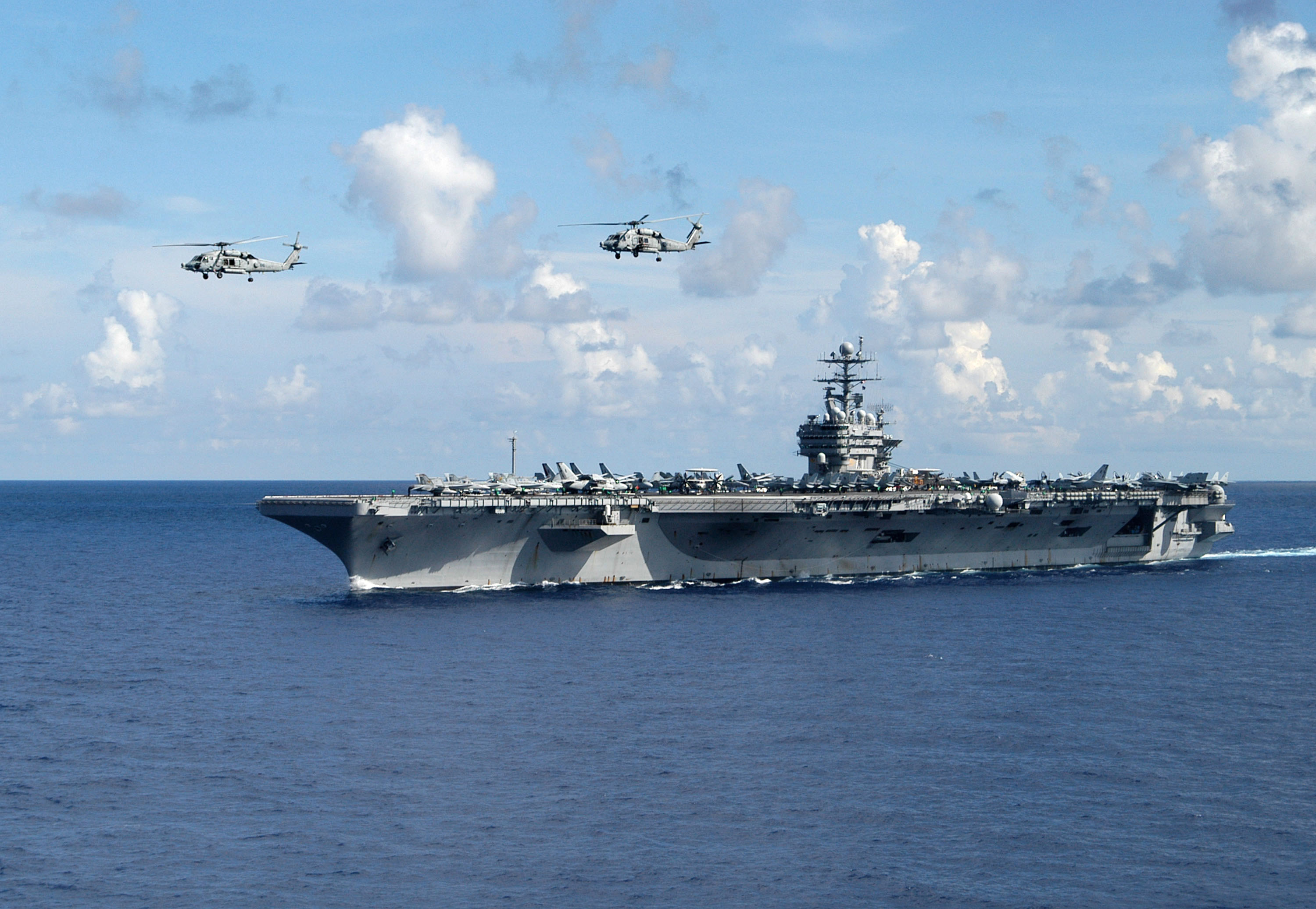
USS Theodore Roosevelt in 2005

The coronavirus pandemic was reported to have spread to the American aircraft carrier USS Theodore Roosevelt when its first three cases were reported on 24 March 2020. As of 5 May 2020, 1,156 crewmembers have tested positive, with one fatality. The Navy has said they will no longer report public tallies of coronavirus cases on the USS Theodore Roosevelt. Initial testing was completed by 27 April 2020, at which point, 969 crew members had tested positive, and 14 of those 969 had recovered. By 29 April 2020, the bulk of the ship had been cleaned, and sailors that were previously quarantined on Guam began moving back to the ship.

This was the first instance of coronavirus being found aboard an American naval ship that had been deployed.

=== USS Ronald Reagan ===
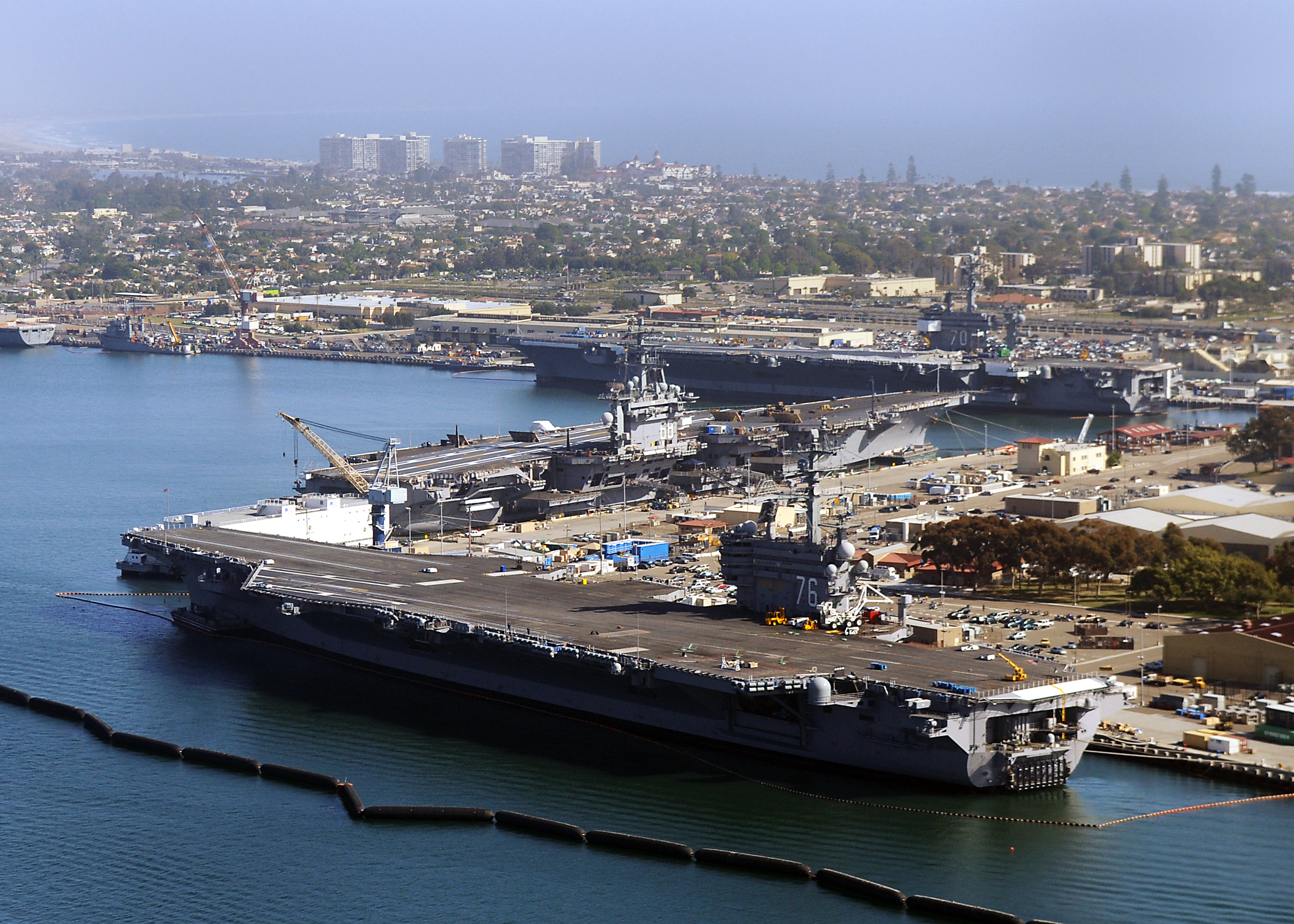
USS Ronald Reagan (foreground), USS Nimitz (midground), and USS Carl Vinson (background) in 2010

The coronavirus pandemic was reported to have spread to the American aircraft carrier USS Ronald Reagan when its first two cases were reported on 27 March 2020. The positive cases forced the closure of the naval base outside Tokyo where the carrier is based, with all personnel on base told to stay indoors for 48 hours. By 23 April 2020, 16 sailors had tested positive.

=== USNS Comfort ===
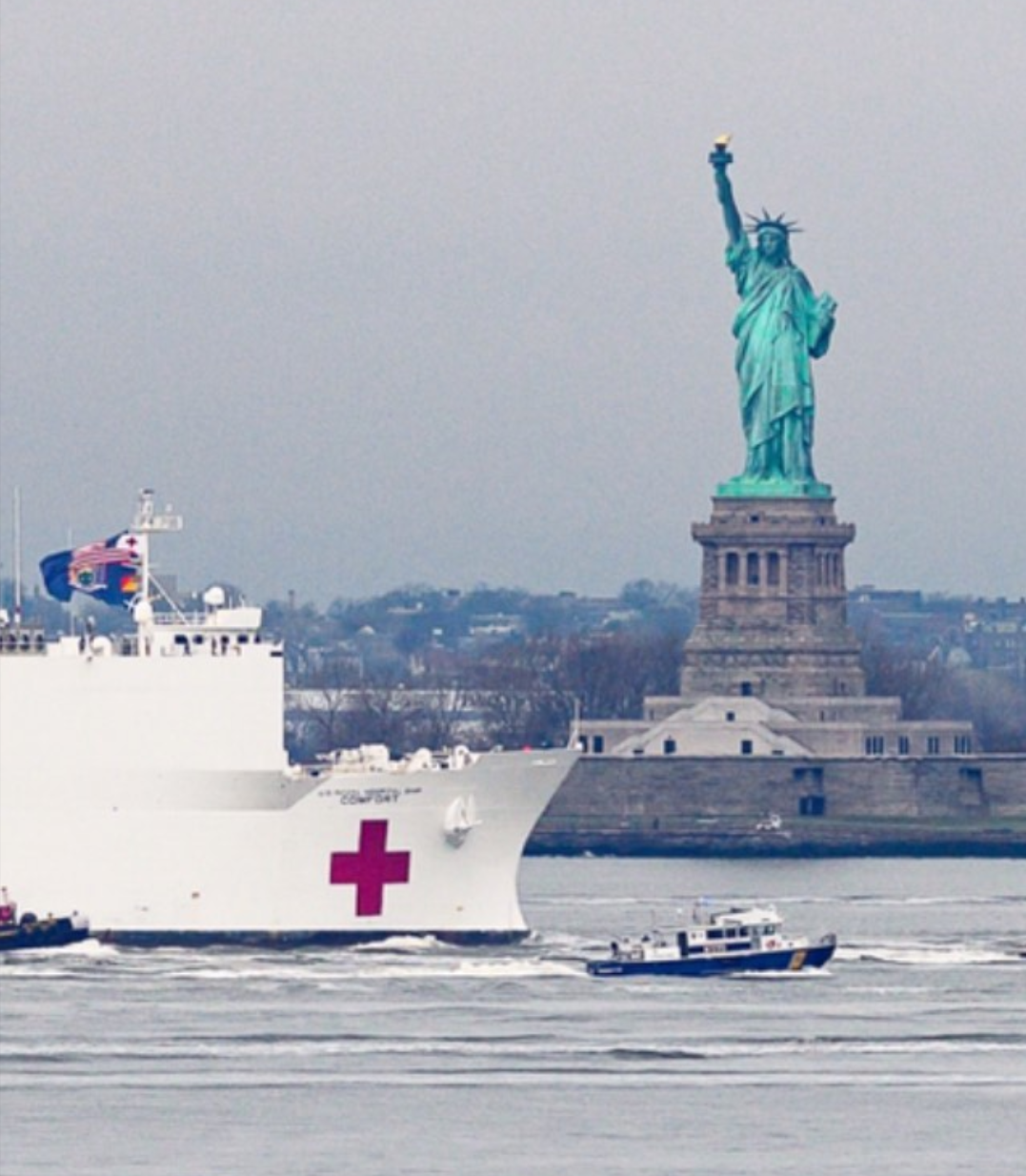
USNS Comfort in New York Harbor

The coronavirus pandemic was reported to have spread to the American hospital ship USNS Comfort when its first case was reported on 7 April 2020. The ship had arrived in Manhattan on 20 March with the intention of treating patients for ailments other than coronavirus so that local hospitals could concentrate on coronavirus cases. However, officials announced on 7 April that the ship's mission had changed and 500 of the ship's 1,000 beds would be allocated for severe coronavirus cases. In addition, as all crew members had tested negative before the ship set sail from Virginia and no crew had left the ship since arriving in New York, it was unclear how the crew member, who is not a medical worker and had no contact with patients, got infected.

It was later revealed that two civil service mariners aboard USNS Comfort had been infected, but both have since recovered.

Comfort departed on 30 April, having treated 179 patients.

=== USS Nimitz ===
The coronavirus pandemic was reported to have spread to the American aircraft carrier USS Nimitz when its first case was reported on 7 April 2020. One sailor received a positive result the previous week after exhibiting symptoms, and was subsequently placed in isolation and removed from the ship. Another crew member has also tested positive, but is reported to have not been working on the ship.

On 27 April, USS Nimitz completed a 27-day quarantine and began COMPTUEX training.

=== USNS Mercy ===
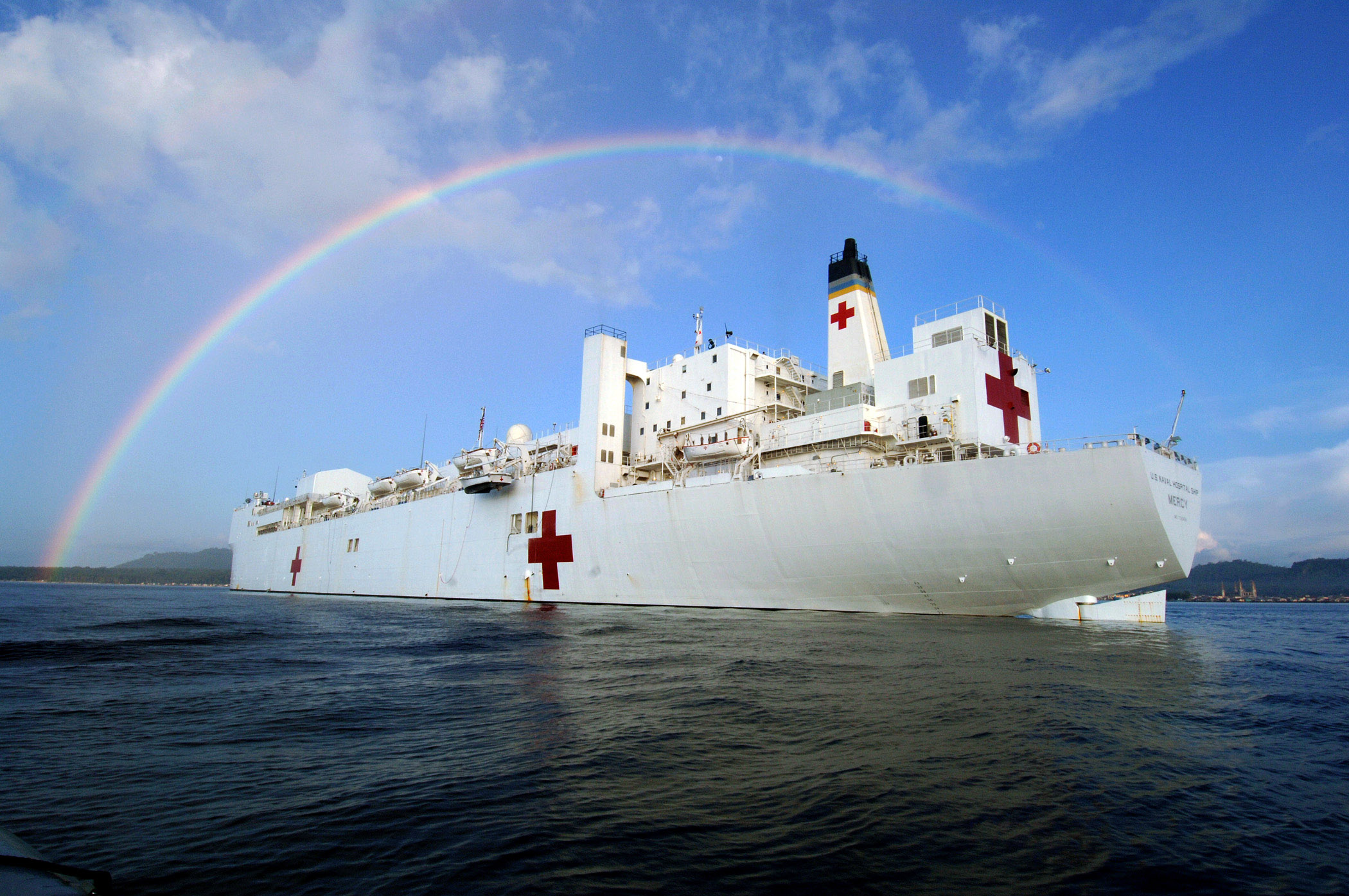
USNS Mercy in 2006

The COVID-19 pandemic spread to the US navy hospital ship USNS Mercy when its first case was reported on 8 April 2020. It is unclear how the crew member became infected, as the crew member had not interacted with any patients, all crew members had been screened before boarding the ship in San Diego and had not been allowed to leave the ship since, and the ship was only treating patients for ailments other than COVID-19, requiring a negative SARS-CoV-2 test result before any patient was allowed to board the ship.

As of 14 April 2020, 7 medical staff members had tested positive, and the Navy had removed 116 medical staff members from the ship in response.

=== USS Tripoli ===
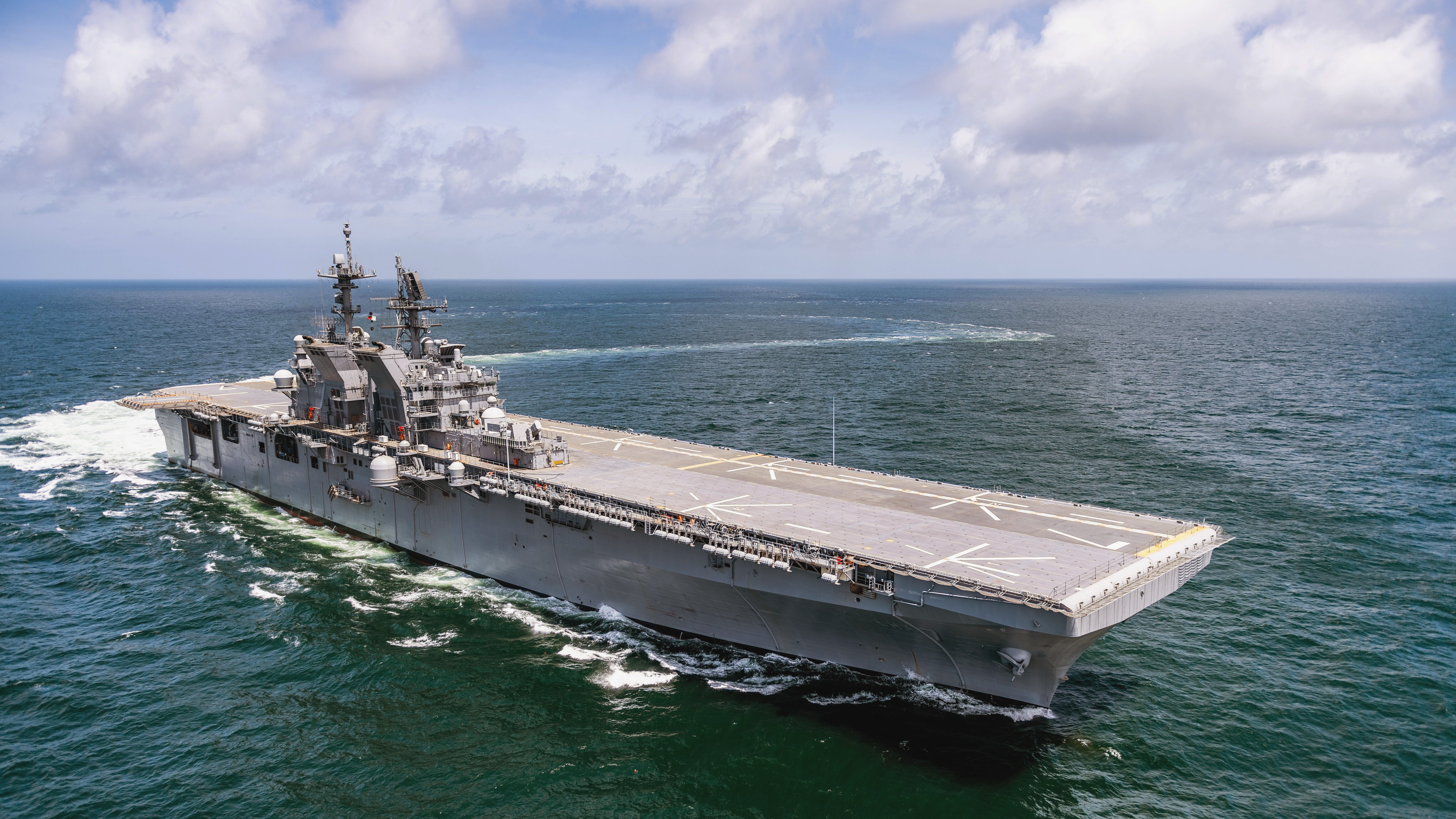
USS Tripoli in 2019

On 17 April 2020, The Wall Street Journal reported that Navy officials had stated that at least 9 sailors assigned to American amphibious assault ship USS Tripoli had tested positive for the virus. At the time, USS Tripoli was docked in Pascagoula, Mississippi, where it had been built by Ingalls Shipbuilding. (Note: The ship was delivered to the Navy on 28 February 2020, but it is unclear whether the sailors had tested positive before or after delivery of the ship, with one source stating that "the ship was set to be delivered ... and hundreds of sailors moved aboard in mid-March".) About 630 sailors were moved off the ship as a preventative measure, which resulted in the outbreak spreading to only "around a couple dozen sailors".

=== USS Kidd ===
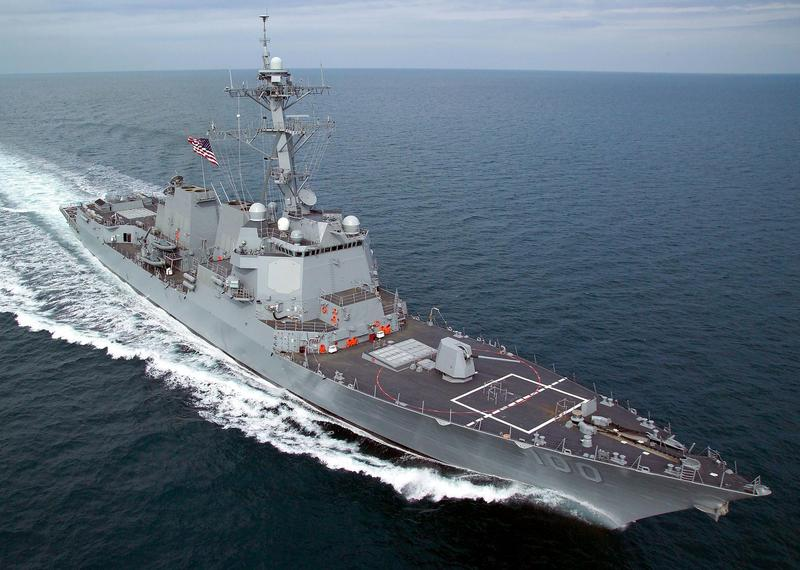
USS Kidd in 2007

On 24 April 2020, the United States Navy reported that a sailor assigned to American destroyer USS Kidd had tested positive for the virus after being medically evacuated the previous day from operations at sea. After the sailor's test returned positive, the Navy sent a medical team to the ship to conduct contact tracing and test sailors for the virus on board. By the morning of 24 April 2020, 17 additional sailors had tested positive, with additional cases expected as testing continued.

The initial patient was stable and recovering at a medical facility in San Antonio, Texas. In total, two sailors have been medically evacuated. Sailors are wearing PPE and N95 masks. USS Makin Island, an amphibious assault ship with a Fleet Surgical Team, an intensive care unit, and ventilators, headed to the ship in case additional medical capacity was required. USS Kidd began to return to port in San Diego for disinfection.

At the time the first sailor was medically evacuated from the ship, USS Kidd had been part of an operation to prevent drug trafficking near South America. It had been at sea since January. A second sailor was later medically evacuated to the states as well.

On 25 April 2020, the Navy reported that 33 positive cases had been found. By 27 April 2020, 45% of the crew members had been tested, with 47 total positive cases reported, and 15 sailors transferred to USS Makin Island for additional monitoring. By 28 April 2020, 64 had tested positive, and USS Kidd had docked in San Diego that afternoon to be disinfected, a process that might take up to two weeks. It is expected that eventually, all sailors on board will be tested for the virus.

This was the second instance of coronavirus being found aboard an American naval ship that had been deployed.

=== USNS Leroy Grumman ===
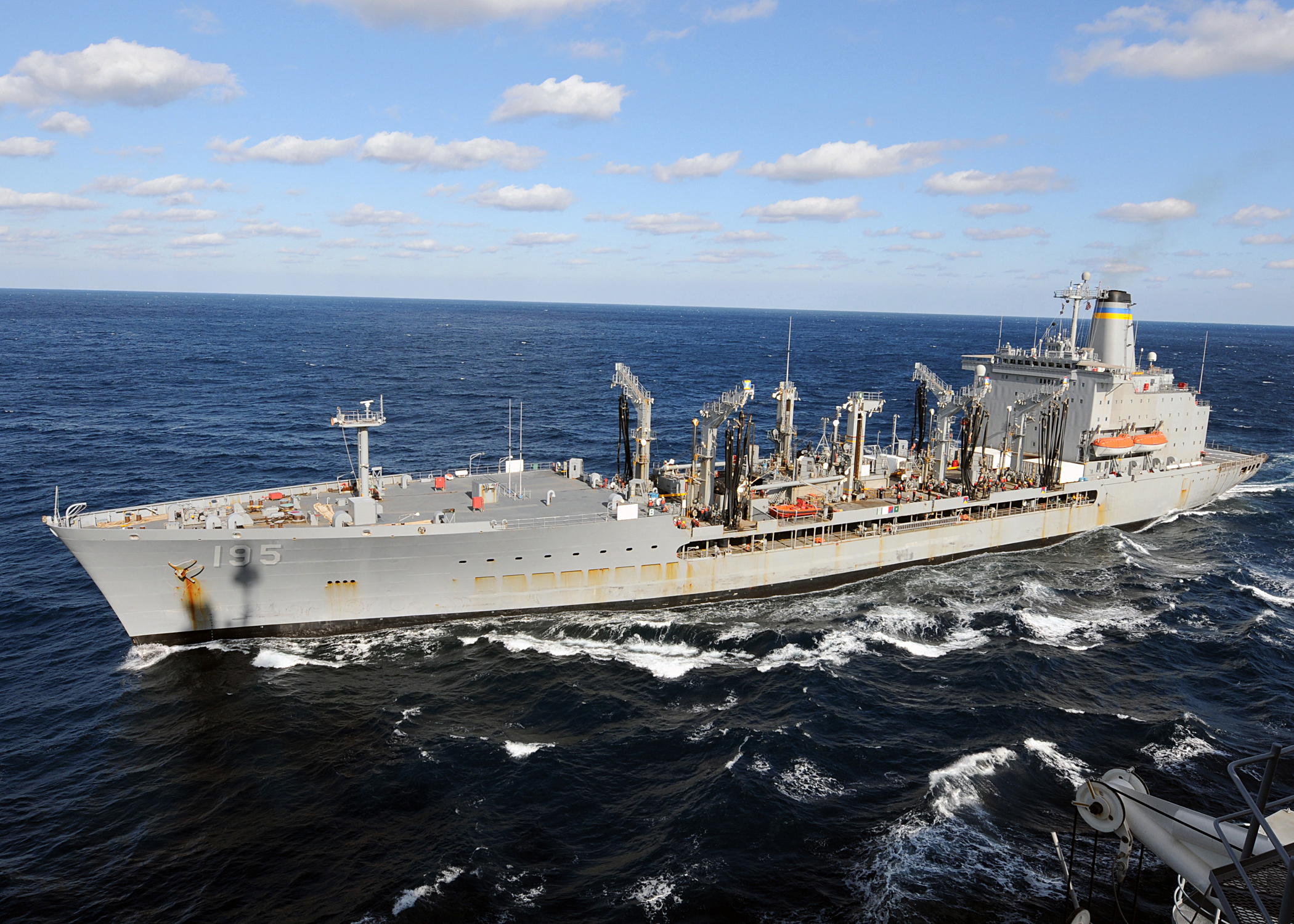
USNS Leroy Grumman in 2010

On 30 April 2020, USNI News reported that two civilian mariners on American fleet replenishment oiler USNS Leroy Grumman had been infected with the virus. The ship had been docked in Boston since January for scheduled maintenance by Boston Ship Repair until the end of May. The source of the infection was unclear, but a spokesperson for Military Sealift Command (MSC) stated that there were outside contractors at the shipyard who had tested positive earlier.

By 5 May 18 sailors had tested positive, including the ship's medic. About 50 people were on board and all were placed under quarantine.

On 19 May 2020, the Project On Government Oversight and The Daily Beast reported that 22 crew members and 30 contractors had tested positive for the virus, and that a 60-year-old contractor who worked in the engine room had died of the virus. In addition, it was reported that mariners had complained about how MSC was "being reactive rather than proactive", and that, despite the issuance of a gangway up order that required all civilian mariners on leave to return to the ship and prevented all mariners from leaving the ship, contractors and other personnel were allowed to embark and disembark with virtually no restrictions, except for random temperature checks and a self-report questionnaire. The ship was eventually vacated on 8 May for seven days.

On 21 May 2020, a civilian mariner was declared dead due to complications of the virus. (Note: One source reported that the mariner died on 2020.05.22, while the Navy stated that the mariner was "pronounced deceased" on 2020.05.21, but first reported it on its page for coronavirus updates on 2020.05.22.) He was hospitalized on 30 April 2020, and was placed on a ventilator in an ICU on 4 May 2020. The deceased was the first civilian mariner to die of the virus on an MSC ship.

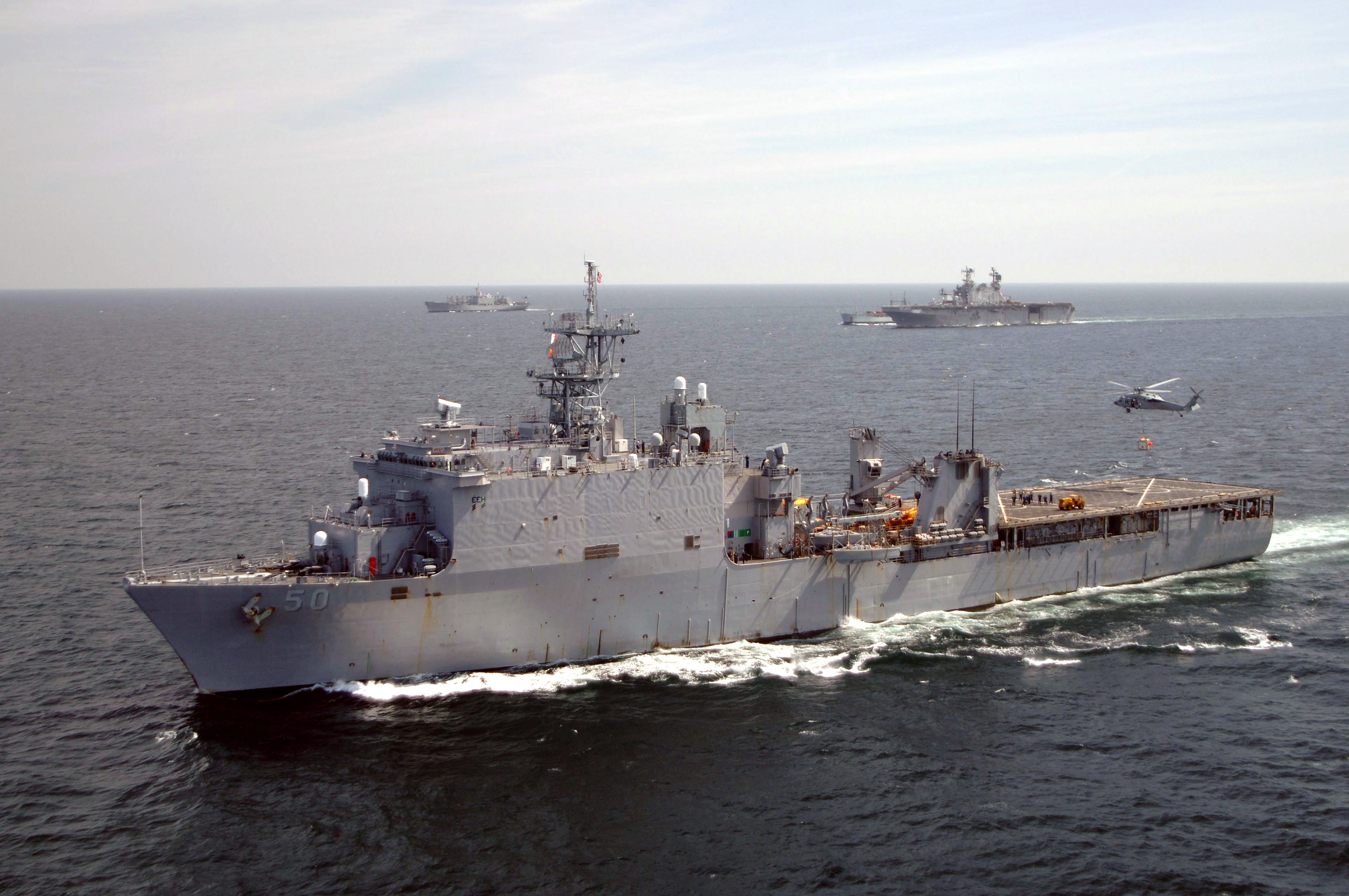
USS Carter Hall in 2006

=== USS Carter Hall ===
On 1 June 2020, Navy Times reported that a Navy spokesperson confirmed that "[s]everal crew members" assigned to American dock landing ship USS Carter Hall had tested positive for the virus on 23 May. The spokesperson declined to provide an exact number of sailors, citing Defense Department policy, but added that those infected were "being checked on each day by their leadership [and] receiving deliveries of food and essential items".

At the time, the ship was docked in Virginia at Joint Expeditionary Base Little Creek–Fort Story, its home base. Most of the roughly 400 crew members were brought ashore while the ship was being sanitized.

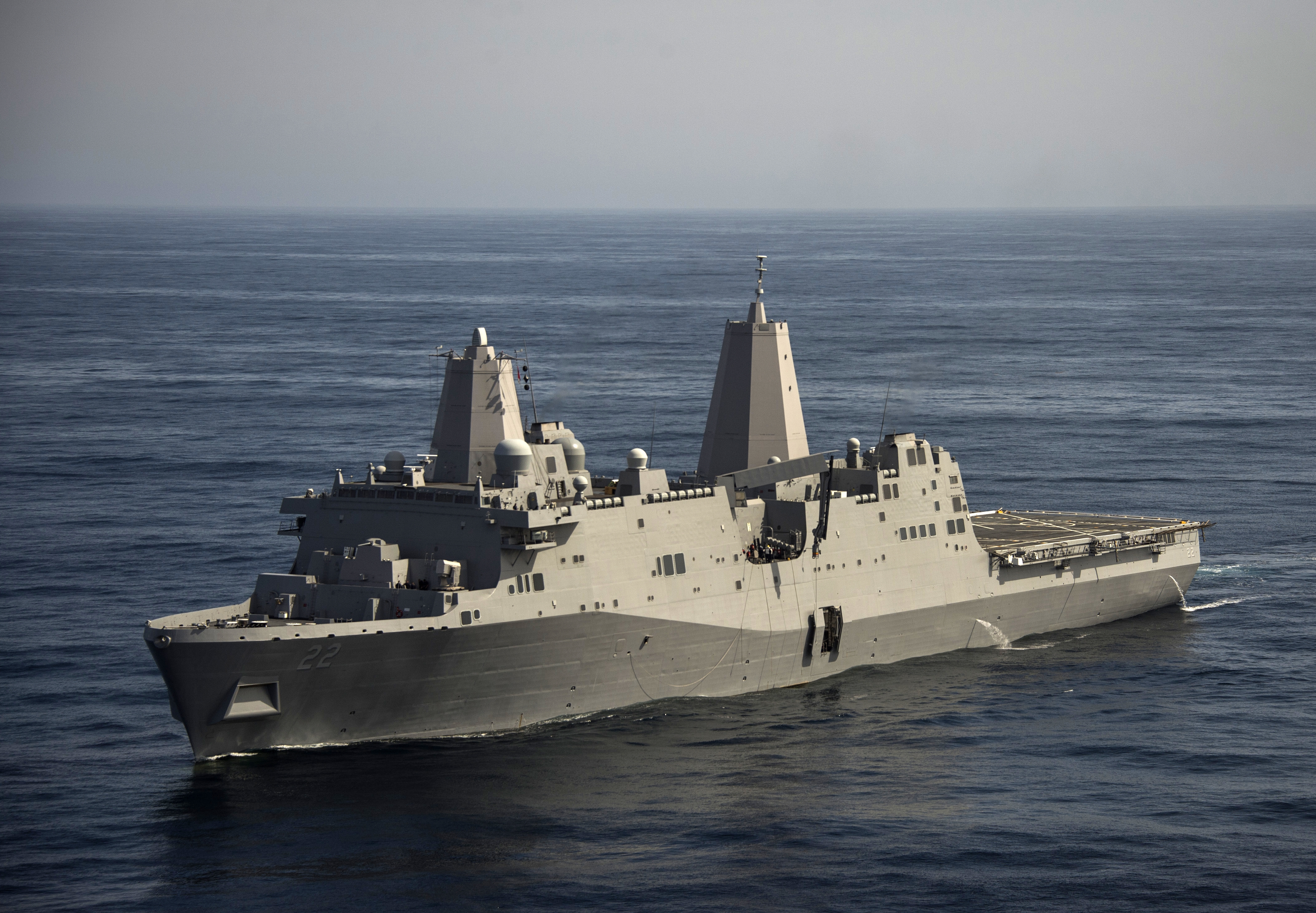
USS San Diego in 2014

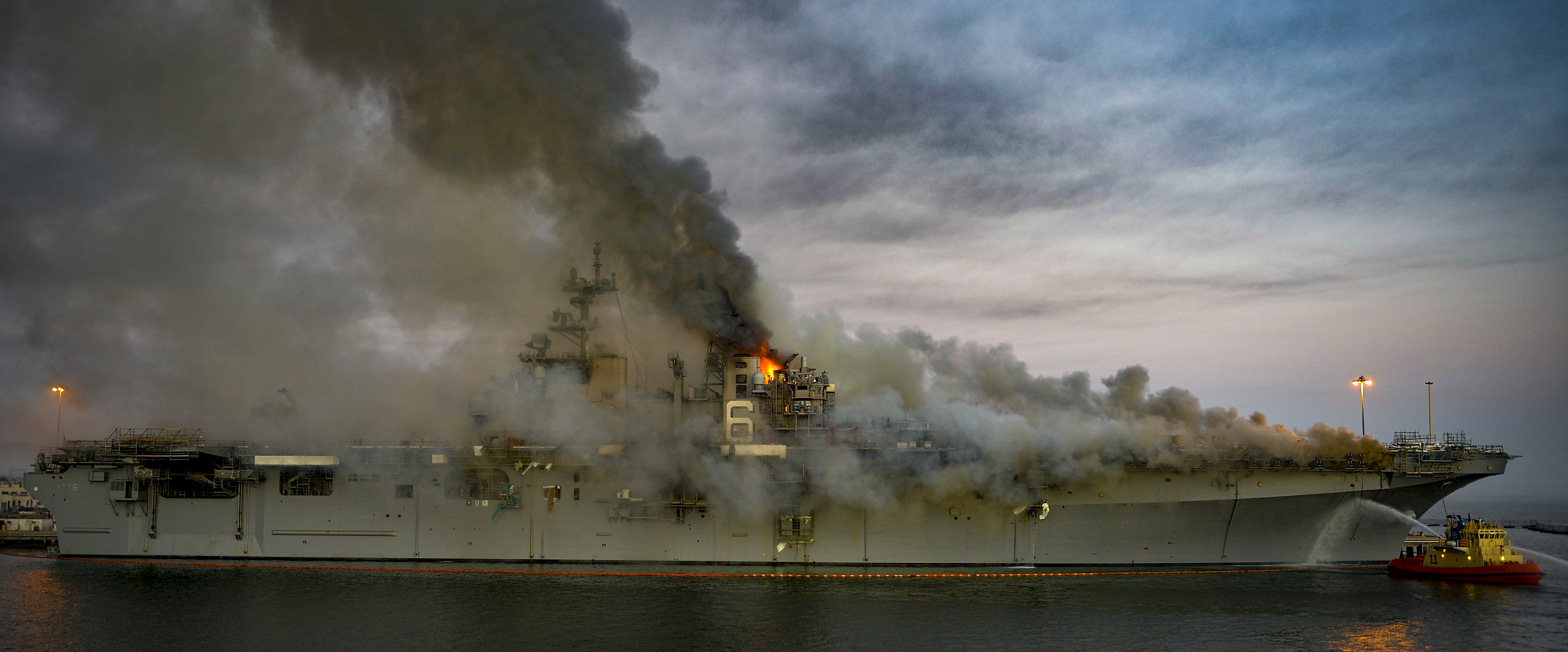
Two sailors fighting the fire aboard USS Bonhomme Richard at San Diego had contracted the virus

=== USS San Diego ===
On 17 July 2020, The San Diego Union-Tribune reported that sailors of the American amphibious transport dock USS San Diego had stated, on condition of anonymity, that at least five sailors from their ship had tested positive for the virus during the preceding few days. The sailors had been interviewed by the Union-Tribune presumably regarding a fire aboard American amphibious assault ship USS Bonhomme Richard. In response, a spokesperson for the US Navy confirmed that two sailors who were part of the firefighting effort had tested positive for the virus. (Note: The San Diego Union-Tribune reported that the two sailors were from USS San Diego, while Navy Times reported that the spokesperson "declined to identify the local commands of the afflicted sailors, citing Defense Department policy for not naming units that suffer COVID-19 outbreaks".)

The two sailors had shown symptoms of the disease. One was part of a crew fighting the fire, and the other had been acting as support. One sailor who fought in the fire stated that the fire had destroyed much of USS Bonhomme Richard's firefighting gear, so the gear of nearby ships, including that of USS San Diego, was being used, and sailors fighting the fire often swapped gear with each other. In addition, 27 close contacts had been identified and placed in quarantine.

=== USS George H.W. Bush ===
On 30 July 2020, Navy Times reported that a spokesperson for Naval Air Force Atlantic confirmed that a "small number" of sailors assigned to American aircraft carrier USS George H.W. Bush had tested positive for the virus during the summer. The spokesperson declined to provide an exact number of sailors or a more precise date regarding when the virus was detected, citing Defense Department policy, but added that the carrier was not deployed at the time, and that those infected "remain[ed] in isolation at their private residences in Virginia and receive[d] daily medical supportive care". USS George H.W. Bush had been docked at Norfolk Naval Shipyard for maintenance since 2019.

=== USS Michael Murphy ===
One quarter of the 300-member crew of USS Michael Murphy have been infected with COVID-19. The majority are asymptomatic, but remain in isolation. USS Michael Murphy was in port in Hawaii, as of 4 November 2020.

== See also ==
- COVID-19 pandemic on cruise ships
- COVID-19 pandemic in North America
- COVID-19 pandemic in Europe
- COVID-19 pandemic in Oceania
- Hospital ships designated for the COVID-19 pandemic
