= COVID-19 pandemic on USS Theodore Roosevelt =

COVID-19 outbreak on board USS Theodore Roosevelt
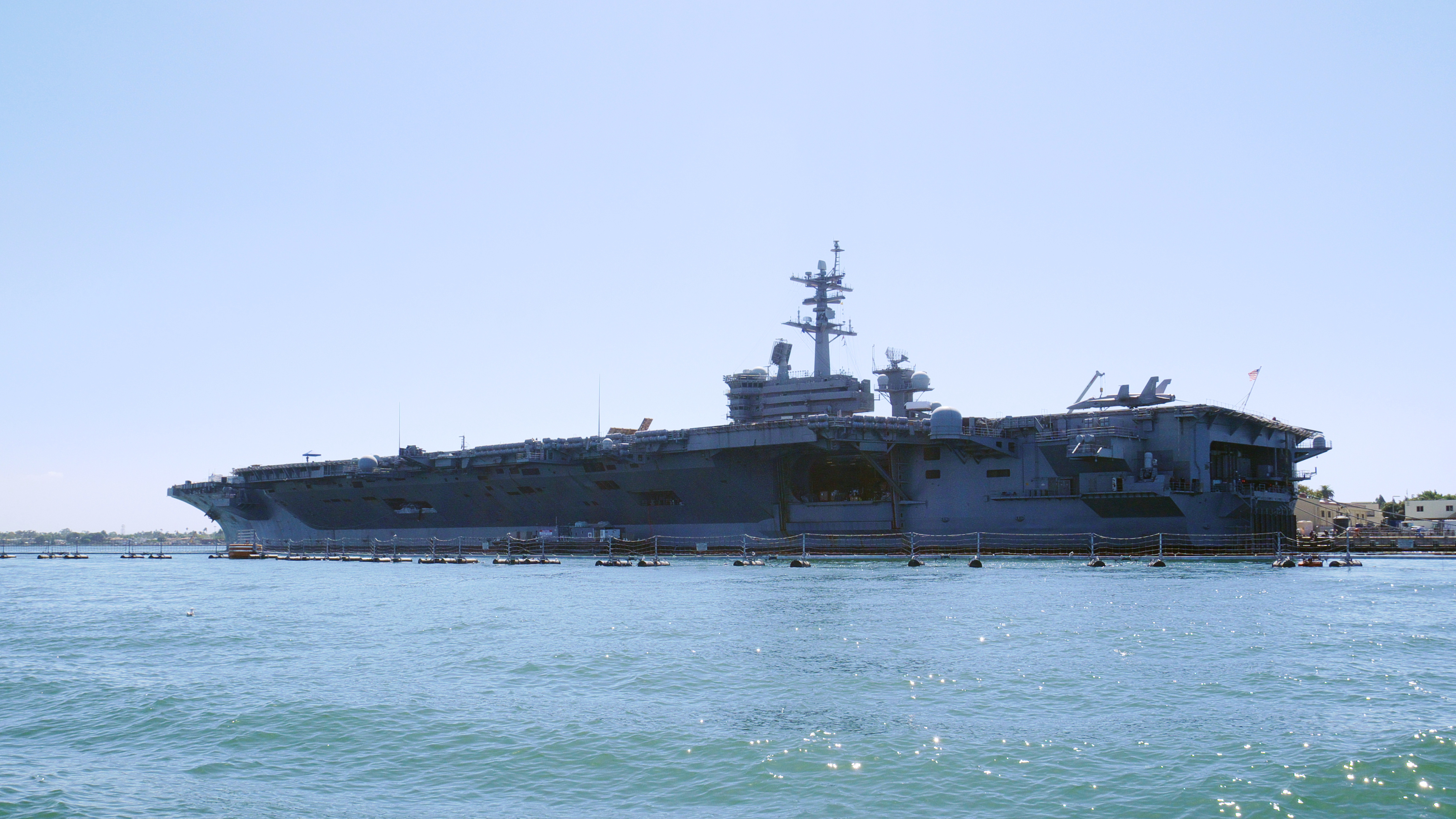
- USS Theodore Roosevelt in October 2019
- Disease: COVID-19
- Pathogen: SARS-CoV-2
- Location: Pacific Ocean
- Index case: Theodore Roosevelt
- Arrival date: 24 March 2020 (6 years, 1 month, 3 weeks and 3 days ago)
- Active cases: 1,156
- Hospitalized cases: 3
- Deaths: 1

The severe acute respiratory syndrome coronavirus 2 (SARS-CoV-2), the cause of the COVID-19 pandemic, was detected on the aircraft carrier USS Theodore Roosevelt in March 2020 while she was at sea. Affected crew members were evacuated and the ship was ordered to Guam. The captain, Brett Crozier, wanted most of the crew to be removed from the ship to prevent the spread of the disease, but his superiors were reluctant. After several days Crozier e-mailed three of his superior officers and seven other Navy Captains, outlining a plan for the ship to be largely evacuated because the virus could not be contained on board. The letter leaked to the press, and the next day the Navy ordered most of the crew to be taken ashore, but the captain was relieved of command by Acting Secretary of the Navy Thomas Modly. Modly's order was controversial, and his later speech to the crew aboard Theodore Roosevelt was criticized. Modly resigned a few days later. By mid-April hundreds of crew members including Crozier had tested positive for the virus, and one had died.

== Timeline ==
In spring 2020, the United States Navy aircraft carrier Theodore Roosevelt was on deployment in the Pacific. The ship docked in Guam on 7 February 2020, when a cruise ship was denied entry to Guam for fears of the virus. The first cases in the COVID-19 pandemic in Guam were confirmed on 15 March 2020, straining the island's ability to cope with additional cases.

=== March ===
On 5 March, the ship made a four-day-long port call at Da Nang, Vietnam. On the last night some sailors stayed at a hotel where two people had tested positive for COVID-19. Upon learning this, the crew were ordered back to the ship and the sailors who had stayed at the hotel were isolated. The ship did not have COVID-19 test kits at the time. The ship departed on 9 March. Over the next weeks the ship's medical team monitored the crew for any signs of infection. The sailors associated with the hotel visit were later tested negative. Samples were tested by the Navy's mobile laboratory on the ship on 19 March.

On 22 March, a first sailor tested positive. By 24 March, three further sailors of the flight crew aboard had tested positive for the virus, and the four affected sailors were flown to Guam, as were another five the next day.

Within a few days, that number climbed to "dozens." Theodore Roosevelt was ordered to Guam and docked on 26–27 March 2020, with most of the crew being restricted to the ship and the pier.

On 30 March, the ship's commanding officer, Captain Brett Crozier, sent an unclassified email to three admirals in his chain of command, including the commander of the United States Pacific Fleet and Admiral Stuart P. Baker, the commander of Carrier Strike Group 9 and his immediate superior. The memo outlined the coronavirus outbreak aboard the ship and recommended that he be given permission to evacuate all non-essential sailors, quarantine known COVID-19 cases, and sanitize the ship. Seven captains – five aboard Theodore Roosevelt and two who are assistants to higher admirals – were copied on the e-mail.

On 31 March, over 100 sailors tested positive. The letter was leaked to the San Francisco Chronicle, which published it.

=== April ===
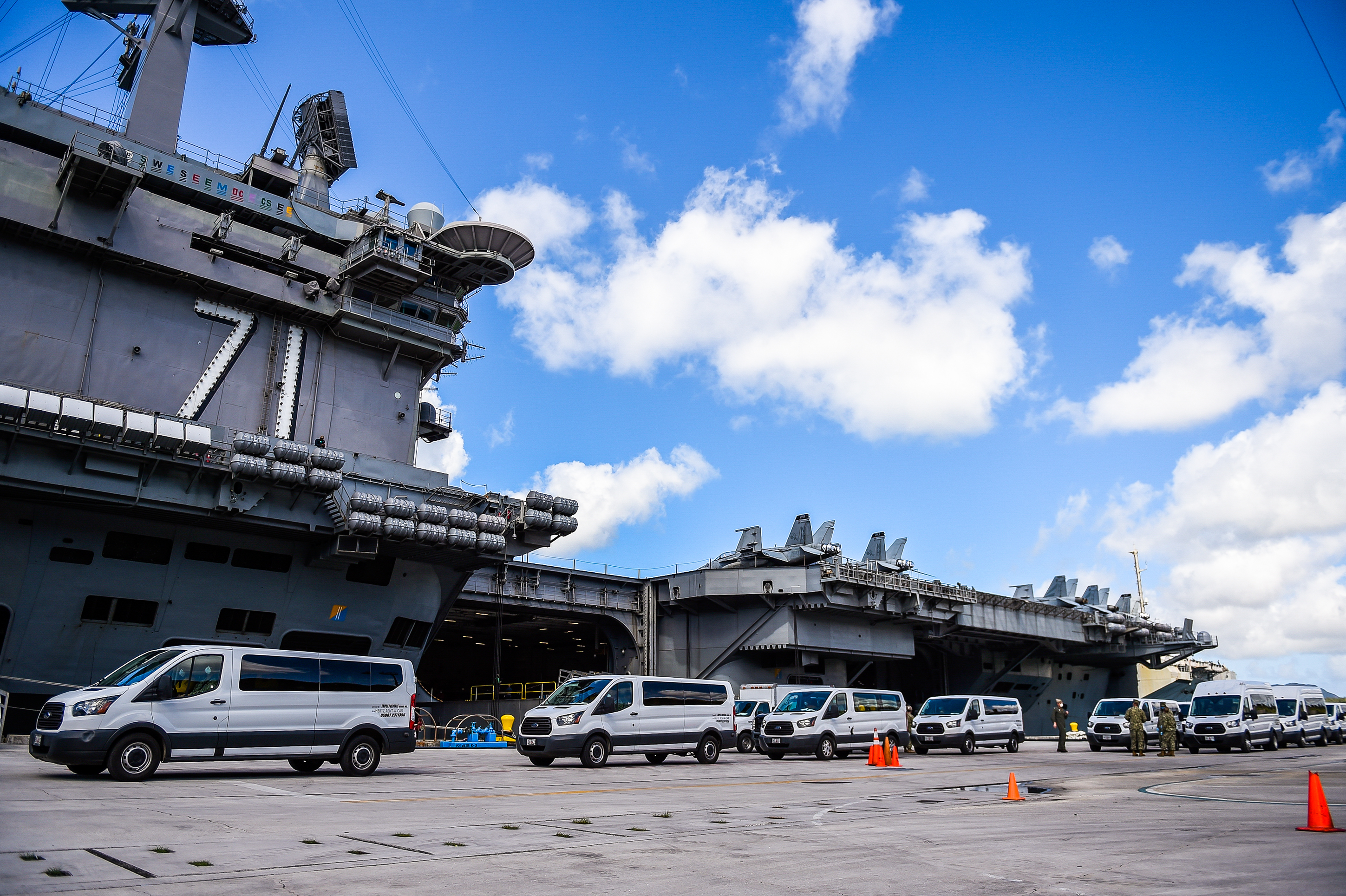
Theodore Roosevelt docked at Naval Base Guam, with transportation for disembarking sailors into isolation

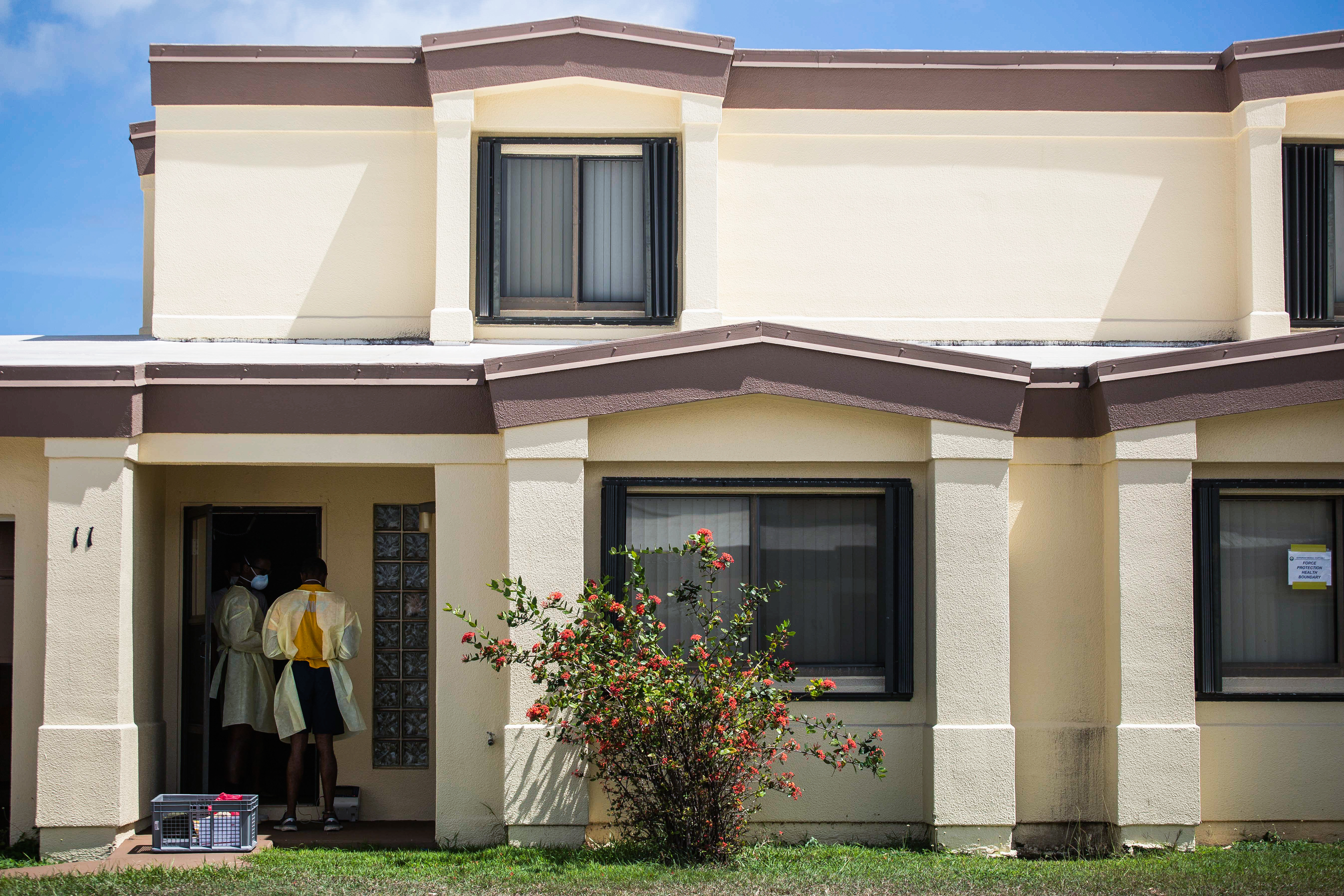
Daily medical checks for Sailors in isolation

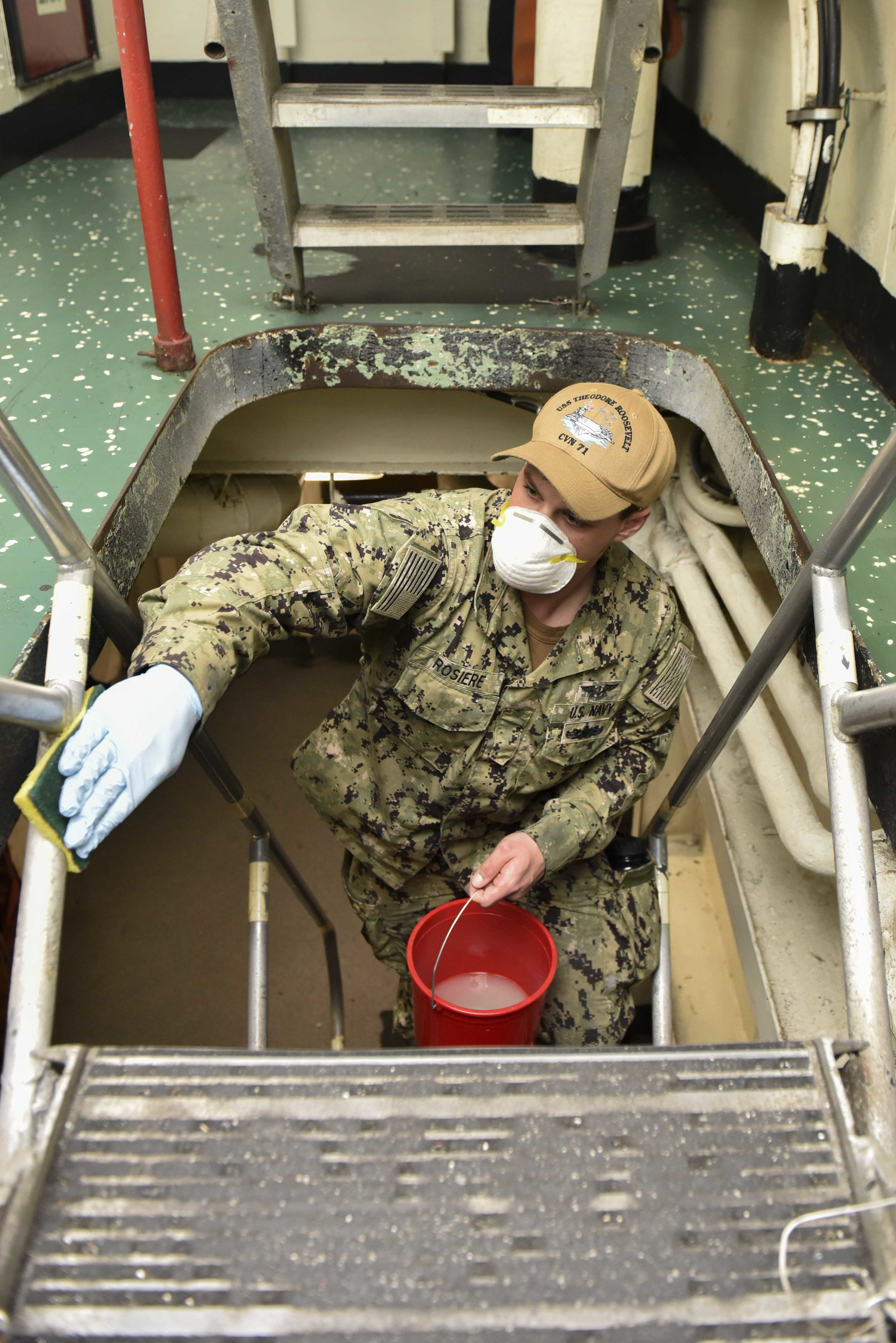
Cleaning the ship

On 1 April, the Navy ordered the aircraft carrier largely evacuated, with a skeleton crew to remain aboard the vessel to maintain the nuclear reactor, the fire-fighting equipment, the ship's galley, and a disinfection crew. About a thousand sailors were moved off the ship, partly to Naval Base Guam, and 1,700 hotel rooms were booked on Guam for TR sailors.

On 2 April, acting Navy Secretary Thomas Modly relieved Crozier of his command. According to Modly, Crozier had sent the letter to "20 or 30 people" and had gone outside his chain of command. However, this account was disputed by writers for the Washington Post because Crozier had addressed and sent the letter directly to his superior, Admiral Baker.

On 5 April 2020, the Navy confirmed that 155 sailors had been infected and that 1,500 sailors had been removed from the ship, a lower number than the Navy had projected several days earlier. A closed social media group provided communication while in quarantine.

On 4–5 April, Modly traveled to Guam to visit the ship in person. On 5 April 1pm local time (11pm Washington time), he made a speech to the crew over the ship's public address system, strongly criticizing Crozier. The transcript and an audio recording of Modly's speech were subsequently leaked to the media. On 6 April, Modly apologized for the comment.

On 7 April, Modly resigned from his post. The Navy said 61% of Theodore Roosevelt's crew had been tested for COVID-19 and 173 members had tested positive, including Captain Crozier. None were hospitalized. Two thousand sailors – just under half the total crew – had been moved ashore.

On 8 April, the Navy reported that 416 crew members had tested positive for the virus, and that one quarantined sailor was placed in intensive care at Naval Hospital Guam after being found unconscious in his quarantine quarters. About 2,500 sailors remained on board.

On 11 April, it was reported that more than 90% of the crew had been tested for the coronavirus, and 550 crew members had tested positive.

As of 12 April 585 crew members had tested positive.

On 13 April, the hospitalized sailor, a 41-year old chief petty officer, died from COVID-19.

As of 20 April, 4,069 sailors had been moved off the ship, out of the total crew of 4,800. Some 94% of the crew had been tested for the virus, yielding 678 positive and 3,904 negative results. As of 17 April, seven crew members were in the hospital including one in intensive care. About 60% of the people who tested positive did not have symptoms. As of 16 April, most of the ship had been cleaned. Sailors kept testing positive for the virus even after 14 days of isolation; some who tested positive had previously tested negative. The Navy temporarily suspended post-quarantine testing and extended the sailors' isolation, delaying plans to begin moves of the crew back to the carrier. Some sailors volunteered for antibody testing.

=== May ===
In early May sailors who had completed quarantine began returning to the ship to get her ready to sail again.

As of 5 May, 1,156 crew members have tested positive. The Navy stopped publicly reporting tallies of new coronavirus cases on USS Theodore Roosevelt.

As of 14 May, 2,900 sailors have returned to the ship.

On 15 May five sailors on the ship developed symptoms and were found to test positive for the virus for the second time. They had previously completed a 14-day quarantine and had tested negative at least twice before being allowed to reboard. The sailors were removed from the ship along with some of their contacts. Officials said it was not clear if these cases reflect actual relapses or problems with the test.

On 21 May Theodore Roosevelt entered the Philippine Sea for carrier qualification flights with 3,000 sailors, leaving 1,800 still in quarantine on Guam; Captain Sardiello announced that the ship would return to Guam for the remaining sailors who have successfully completed quarantine.

=== June ===
In early June, around 350 sailors were in isolation on Guam.

== Crozier's letter ==
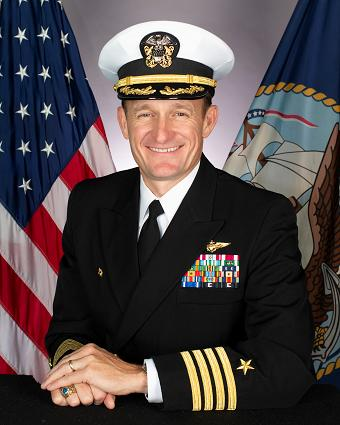
Ship's commanding officer, Captain Brett Crozier

When the ship arrived in Guam on 26 March the ship's commanding officer, Captain Brett Crozier, wanted to have most of the crew immediately taken ashore, saying it was impossible to prevent the spread of the virus in the close quarters of the ship. Rear Adm. Stuart P. Baker, who was the commanding officer of Carrier Strike Group 9 and thus Crozier's immediate superior, disagreed, feeling such an action was impractical and too drastic.

On 30 March, Crozier sent an email to communicate the status of his ship and her crew, saying it was not possible to observe CDC/Navy recommendations for individual quarantine or social distancing aboard the carrier. Crozier referred to the viral spread on the less crowded cruise ship Diamond Princess as an example of how quickly a virus can spread on a crowded vessel. The letter provided his superiors with options, including ready for battle while sick, but recommended most of the crew's evacuation, keeping only enough crew on board to maintain the nuclear reactors, provide security, and to sanitize the ship. The e-mail was sent to three superior officers in his chain of command, including his direct superior, Rear Admiral Baker, and was copied to seven captains – five of whom were aboard the Roosevelt, the other two of whom were executive assistants to the admirals. The letter was leaked to the San Francisco Chronicle, which published it the next day.

== Relieving Crozier of command and aftermath ==
On 2 April, acting Navy Secretary Thomas Modly relieved Crozier of his command for sending the request for assistance over non-secure email to a "broad array of people" rather than up the chain of command, adding that Crozier "allowed the complexity of the challenge of the COVID breakout on the ship to overwhelm his ability to act professionally". Crozier will remain in the Navy and retain his rank. As Crozier disembarked, sailors were seen chanting "Cap-tain Cro-zier" in a video posted to Twitter captioned "Wrongfully relieved of command but did right by the sailors."

External videos
- U.S. Department of Defense briefing with Navy Secretary Modly in which he announces the relief of Capt. Crozier from his duty as the captain of the Theodore Roosevelt, April 2, 2020, C-SPAN

Modly claimed that Crozier had sent a "blast out email to anybody who he knows about the situation" and even "copied [the email] to 20 or 30 other people." The Washington Post subsequently obtained the e-mail and found that it had been sent to only 10 people, all Navy admirals or captains.

Reaction to Crozier's dismissal was mixed. A Wall Street Journal story reported that on "Capitol Hill and inside the Pentagon, lawmakers and officials reacted with confusion and anger over the dismissal" of Crozier. A joint statement from four Democrats on the House Armed Services Committee, including the committee chair, Representative Adam Smith (D-WA), criticized Crozier's conduct, saying that "Captain Crozier was justifiably concerned about the health and safety of his crew, but he did not handle the immense pressure appropriately. However, relieving him of his command is an overreaction." President Trump also criticized Crozier's letter on 4 April saying that it was "not appropriate."

Modly, U.S. Defense Secretary Mark Esper, and Chief of Naval Operations Admiral Michael Gilday each defended the decision to remove Crozier, although Gilday and Gen. Mark A. Milley, the chairman of the Joint Chiefs of Staff, had earlier advised Modly not to do it until a Navy investigation into the matter had been completed. Modly added that there was no White House pressure when the decision was made to remove Crozier.

On 6 April Modly traveled 8,000 miles (13,000 km) to Guam on a Navy executive jet; the trip was later reported to have cost taxpayers at least $243,000. He visited the ship and spoke to the crew over the ship's public address system. He began by blaming the Chinese government for worsening the outbreak by not revealing how bad the disease was. He continued by criticizing Crozier as "too naïve or too stupid to be a commanding officer" if he did not realize that his letter would be leaked to the media. Modly also scolded the ship's crew for cheering their captain as Crozier departed the ship. Modly's speech was widely criticized. Senator Tim Kaine stated, "It's deeply disappointing that he would deliver a speech on board a U.S. aircraft carrier suggesting that Captain Crozier might be 'stupid'." House Speaker Nancy Pelosi and Representative Elaine Luria called for the removal of Modly, with Luria, a Navy veteran, saying he was "in no way fit" to lead the Navy. Representative Jackie Speier, chairperson of the Armed Services Committee's panel on military personnel, also criticized the trip. In the evening, the same day as he made the speech, Modly apologized for the comment. The next day, 7 April, he resigned his position.

On 24 April, Gilday and acting Navy secretary James McPherson recommended to Secretary Esper that Crozier be reinstated. However, Defense Secretary Esper delayed a decision pending a "deeper review" of the situation. A Navy inquiry, whose results were announced on 19 June, concluded that Crozier and Baker made poor decisions regarding the coronavirus outbreak, so that Crozier will not be restored to command of the ship, and Baker's scheduled promotion will be put on hold.

In June 2020, ADM R. Burke, Vice Chief of Naval Operations at the Department of the Navy, released the results of his investigation concerning the chain of command actions with regard to COVID-19 onboard USS Theodore Roosevelt. As a review of the investigation results, Burke determined that "reassigning CAPT Crozier as the Commanding Officer (CO) of the USS THEODORE ROOSEVELT (CVN 71) is not in the best interest of Navy." Burke continues his preliminary statement, stating, "It is clear to me following this investigation, CAPT Crozier did not act according to the standards I expect of our commanding officers-to adapt in the face of adversity, exercise ingenuity and creativity in crisis, demonstrate resilience, communicate effectively up the chain of command, and to take bold and appropriate action early and often. His actions and inactions in the timeframe before sending the email fell well short of what I expect from our officers in command."

== Fatality ==
On 13 April, the death of a 41-year-old chief petty officer, was announced. Charles Thacker Jr. was the first active-duty member of the U.S. military to die of COVID-19.

== Number of confirmed cases ==
In total, 1271 crew members tested positive for SARS-Cov-2 and an additional 60 had suspected COVID-19 but did not test positive; 76.9% of those who tested positive were asymptomatic at testing and only 55% developed any symptoms.

== See also ==
- COVID-19 pandemic on the Charles de Gaulle, a similar outbreak on a French aircraft carrier
- COVID-19 pandemic on naval ships
- COVID-19 pandemic in the United States
- COVID-19 pandemic in Oceania
