= James Goodrich =

James Goodrich may refer to:

- James F. Goodrich (1913–2012), United States Under Secretary of the Navy
- James Goodrich (Royal Navy officer) (1851–1925), British admiral
- James P. Goodrich (1864–1940), Governor of Indiana
- James T. Goodrich (1946–2020), American neurosurgeon
- Jimmy Goodrich, American boxer
