= M. B. Oglesby =

American government official (born 1942)

White House Deputy Chief of Staff
- In office July 1, 1988 – January 20, 1989
- President: Ronald Reagan
- Preceded by: Kenneth Duberstein
- Succeeded by: Andrew Card

White House Director of Legislative Affairs
- In office December 15, 1983 – February 28, 1986
- President: Ronald Reagan
- Preceded by: Kenneth Duberstein
- Succeeded by: William L. Ball

Personal details
- Born: Marion Oglesby Jr. October 1, 1942 (age 83) Flora, Illinois, U.S.
- Party: Republican
- Education: University of Illinois, Urbana-Champaign (attended)

Marion B. Oglesby Jr. (born October 1, 1942) served as U.S. president Ronald Reagan's White House Deputy Chief of Staff from 1988 to 1989.

== Early life and education ==
Oglesby attended the University of Illinois, Urbana-Champaign.

== Political career ==
In June 1988, President Reagan Tuesday tapped Oglesby to serve as White House Deputy chief of staff. Oglesby succeeded Kenneth Duberstein, who had been promoted to the post of chief of staff, succeeding Howard Baker, who had resigned.

From 1981 to 1986, Oglesby served in the White House Office of Legislative Affairs, leaving to take a post as vice chairman of the board of Hect, Specer & Oglesby, Inc., a government relations firm in Washington.

Prior to his Legislative Affairs service, Oglesby was minority staff associate for the House Energy and Commerce Committee. He also served as deputy and acting director of the State of Illinois' office in Washington DC, and as Executive Assistant to Congressman Ed Madigan. Prior to coming to Washington, Oglesby served as an assistant to Governor Richard B. Oglivie and as executive assistant to the Speaker of the House W. Robert Blair.

== Later career ==
During the 1990s, Oglesby chaired the Congressional Institute, and was an Executive with R. J. Reynolds.

Political offices
| Preceded by Kenneth Duberstein | White House Director of Legislative Affairs; 1983–1986 | Succeeded by William L. Ball |
