= Henry L. Garrett III =

Former US government official (born 1939)

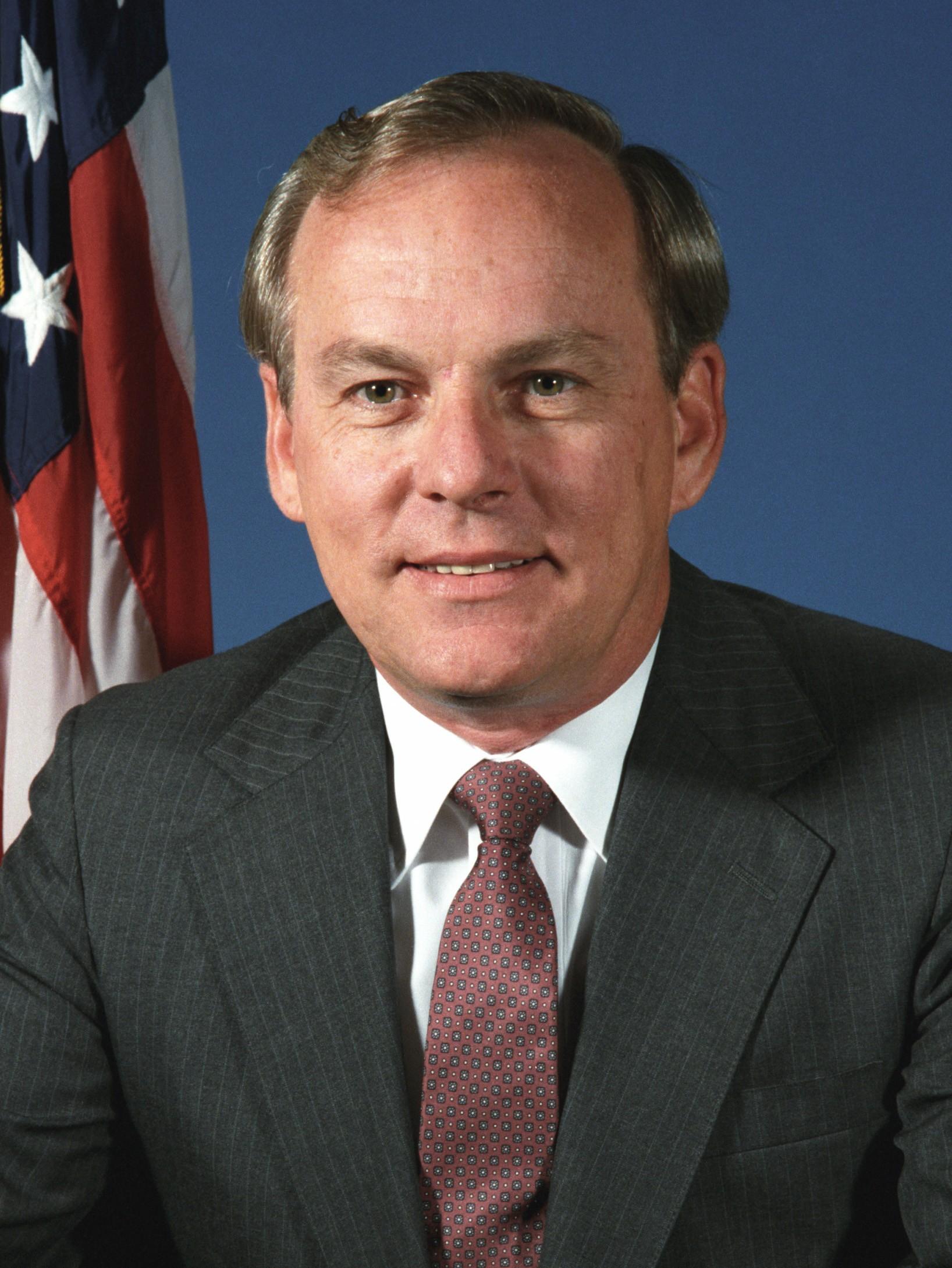
- Official portrait, 1987

68th United States Secretary of the Navy
- In office May 15, 1989 – June 26, 1992
- President: George H. W. Bush
- Preceded by: William L. Ball
- Succeeded by: J. Daniel Howard (Acting)

24th United States Under Secretary of the Navy
- In office August 6, 1987 – May 15, 1989
- President: Ronald Reagan
- Preceded by: James F. Goodrich
- Succeeded by: J. Daniel Howard

Personal details
- Born: Henry Lawrence Garrett III; June 24, 1939 (age 86) Washington, D.C., U.S.
- Party: Republican
- Education: University of West Florida (BS); University of San Diego (JD)

Military service
- Allegiance: United States
- Branch: United States Navy
- Service years: 1961–1981
- Unit: VP-50 (1965–1967)
- Conflicts: Cuban Missile Crisis; Vietnam War
- Awards: Air Medal (2)

Henry Lawrence Garrett III (born June 24, 1939) is an American former politician who served as the 68th Secretary of the Navy from May 15, 1989, to June 26, 1992, in the administration of George H. W. Bush. Before leading the Department of the Navy, he served as General Counsel of the Department of Defense.

== Career ==
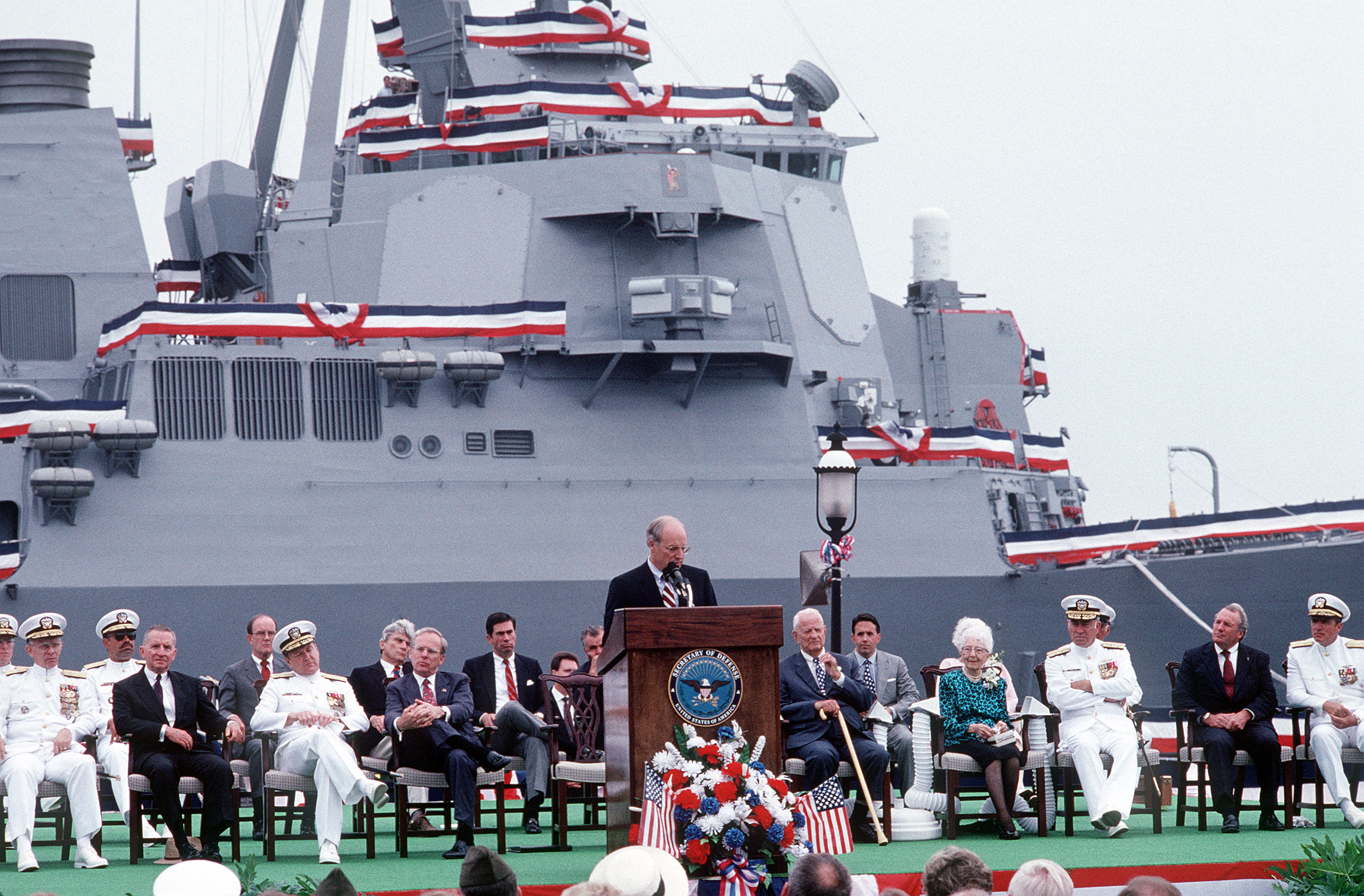
Garrett at the commissioning ceremony for the USS Arleigh Burke with Arleigh Burke and wife present and Secretary of Defense Dick Cheney delivering the keynote address in July 1991.

Garrett served in the U.S. Navy from October 1961 to November 1981, initially as a machinist's mate aboard USS Sea Poacher during the Cuban Missile Crisis, before getting commissioned as a naval flight officer in 1964. He served with VP-50 in the Vietnam War from 1965 to 1967 and was awarded the Air Medal two times during his military career. Garrett was the 68th United States Secretary of the Navy.

Garrett ultimately resigned due to the Tailhook scandal.

Garrett has been a very active supporter of the Naval Aviation Museum and the Naval Aviation Museum Foundation. He is a long time member of the Aviation Museum Board of Trustees.

Garrett retired as an executive vice president of Rolls-Royce North America supporting the sale and operation of Rolls-Royce engines in the USN and US Marine Corps, Adour and Pegasus. He was formerly a partner in the Washington law firm of Lipsen, Hamberger, and Garrett.

Government offices
Preceded by James F. Goodrich	United States Under Secretary of the Navy; August 6, 1987 – May 15, 1989	Succeeded by J. Daniel Howard
Preceded by William L. Ball	United States Secretary of the Navy; May 15, 1989 – June 26, 1992	Succeeded by J. Daniel Howard (acting); Sean O'Keefe
