= David R. Macdonald =

American government official

David Robert Macdonald (November 1, 1930 – November 28, 2008) was an American government official. He served as United States Assistant Secretary of the Treasury (Enforcement, Operations, and Tariff Affairs) from 1974 to 1976; as Under Secretary of the Navy from 1976 to 1977; and as Deputy U.S. Trade Representative from 1981 to 1983.

== Biography ==
David Robert Macdonald was born in Chicago, Illinois on November 1, 1930. He was educated at Cornell University, receiving a B.S. in 1952, and at the University of Michigan Law School, receiving a J.D. in 1955. After serving in the United States Army from 1955 to 1957, Macdonald took a job as an attorney with the Chicago law firm of Kirkland & Ellis. He worked at Kirkland & Ellis until 1962, at which point he joined Baker & McKenzie as a partner.

Macdonald practiced law at Baker & McKenzie until 1974, when he left the firm upon being appointed Assistant Secretary of the Treasury (Enforcement, Operations, and Tariff Affairs). In 1976, President of the United States Gerald Ford nominated Macdonald as Under Secretary of the Navy and Macdonald held this office from September 14, 1976, to February 4, 1977.

Upon leaving public service in 1977, Macdonald returned to Baker & McKenzie. He also became a member of the board of directors of the Chicago Crime Commission at this time. In 1980, he was a member of the executive committee of the World Trade Conference.

From 1979 to 1981, Macdonald was an active member of the Republican National Committee, serving on its Policy Board, Economic Affairs Council, and as cochairman of its tax subcommittee. In 1981, President Ronald Reagan named Macdonald as a Deputy U.S. Trade Representative under United States Trade Representative Bill Brock, and Macdonald served in this capacity until 1983, at which point he again returned to Baker & McKenzie.

Macdonald died at home on November 28, 2008, at the age of 78.

== Sources ==
- David R. Macdonald's papers at the Gerald Ford Presidential Library Archived 2010-06-10 at the Wayback Machine
- Press conference announcing nomination of Macdonald as Deputy United States Trade Representative

Government offices
Preceded by David S. Potter	Under Secretary of the Navy; September 14, 1976 – February 4, 1977	Succeeded by R. James Woolsey, Jr.
