= Andrew Card =

American politician (born 1947)

Andy Card
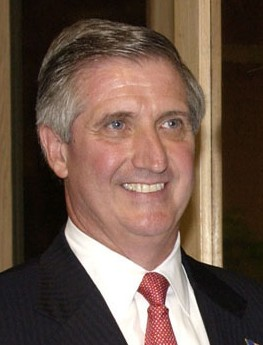
- Card in 2002

5th President of Franklin Pierce University
- In office January 12, 2015 – August 1, 2016
- Preceded by: James Birge
- Succeeded by: Kim Mooney

Acting Dean of the Bush School of Government and Public Service
- In office July 5, 2011 – August 1, 2013
- Preceded by: Ryan Crocker
- Succeeded by: Ryan Crocker

21st White House Chief of Staff
- In office January 20, 2001 – April 14, 2006
- President: George W. Bush
- Preceded by: John Podesta
- Succeeded by: Joshua Bolten

11th United States Secretary of Transportation
- In office February 24, 1992 – January 20, 1993
- President: George H. W. Bush
- Preceded by: Samuel K. Skinner
- Succeeded by: Federico Peña

White House Deputy Chief of Staff
- In office January 20, 1989 – February 3, 1992
- President: George H. W. Bush
- Preceded by: M. B. Oglesby
- Succeeded by: Henson Moore

Director of the White House Office of Intergovernmental Affairs
- In office May 2, 1988 – September 21, 1988
- President: Ronald Reagan
- Preceded by: Gwendolyn King
- Succeeded by: Karen Spencer

Member of the Massachusetts House of Representatives
- In office January 1, 1975 – January 5, 1983
- Preceded by: Charles McGowan (8th Norfolk); Charles Decas (7th Plymouth)
- Succeeded by: Bill Keating (8th Norfolk); Emmet Hayes (7th Plymouth)
- Constituency: 8th Norfolk (1975–1979); 7th Plymouth (1979–1983)

Personal details
- Born: Andrew Hill Card Jr. May 10, 1947 (age 79) Brockton or Holbrook, Massachusetts, U.S.
- Party: Republican
- Spouse: Kathleene Card
- Children: 3
- Education: United States Merchant Marine Academy (attended); University of South Carolina (BS); Harvard University (attended)

Andrew Hill Card Jr. (born May 10, 1947) is an American politician and academic administrator who was White House Chief of Staff under President George W. Bush from 2001 to 2006, as well as head of Bush's White House Iraq Group. Card served as United States Secretary of Transportation under President George H. W. Bush from 1992 to 1993.

Card announced his resignation as Chief of Staff on March 28, 2006, effective April 14, 2006. Card was the Acting Dean of the Bush School of Government and Public Service, at Texas A&M University from 2011 to 2013. In 2014, Card became the president of Franklin Pierce University, serving until he retired from that post in the summer of 2016.

== Early life and education ==
Card was born on May 10, 1947, the son of Joyce (née Whitaker) and Andrew Hill Card Sr. He was active in the Boy Scouts of America's Old Colony Council and earned the rank of Life Scout. He grew up in Holbrook, Massachusetts and graduated from Holbrook High School in 1965. He attended the United States Merchant Marine Academy from 1966 to 1967 before graduating from the University of South Carolina with a Bachelor of Science in civil engineering in 1971. He also attended the John F. Kennedy School of Government at Harvard University.

== Career ==
=== Early career ===
Card got his start in politics serving in the Massachusetts House of Representatives from 1975 to 1983. He ran unsuccessfully for the Republican nomination for Governor of Massachusetts in 1982.

=== Private career ===
From 1993 to 1998, Card was president and chief executive officer of the American Automobile Manufacturers Association (AAMA), the trade association whose members were Chrysler Corporation, Ford Motor Company and General Motors Corporation. The AAMA dissolved in December 1998. From 1999 until his selection as President Bush's Chief of Staff, Card was General Motors' Vice President of Government Relations. Card directed the company's international, national, state and local government affairs activities and represented GM on matters of public policy before Congress and the administration.

He serves on the board of directors of Union Pacific Railroad. The railroad announced on July 27, 2006, that Card was elected to the board, increasing the board's size to 10 members. He is also a senior counselor at public relations firm Fleishman-Hillard.

On November 7, 2019, he joined the board of directors of Draganfly, a manufacturer of commercial Unmanned Aerial Vehicles (“UAVs”) Unmanned Vehicle Systems (“UVSes”).

=== Government career ===
==== Under Ronald Reagan ====
Card first served in the West Wing under President Ronald Reagan, as Special Assistant to the President for Intergovernmental Affairs and subsequently as Deputy Assistant to the President and Director of Intergovernmental Affairs, where he was liaison to governors, statewide elected officials, state legislators, mayors and other elected officials.

==== Under George H. W. Bush ====
From 1989 to 1992, Card served in President George H. W. Bush's administration as Assistant to the President and Deputy Chief of Staff. From 1992 until 1993, Card served as the 11th U.S. Secretary of Transportation under President Bush. In August 1992, at the request of President Bush, Secretary Card coordinated the administration's disaster relief efforts in the wake of Hurricane Andrew. Later that year, Secretary Card directed President Bush's transition office during the transition from the Bush administration to the Clinton administration.

==== Under George W. Bush ====
In 2000, Card was asked by Texas Governor George W. Bush to run the Republican National Convention in Philadelphia.

On November 26, 2000, Card was appointed to be chief of staff for President-elect George W. Bush upon Bush's January 20, 2001 inauguration.

On the day of September 11 attacks, Card approached Bush as he was visiting an elementary school in Sarasota, Florida, and whispered in his ear the news that a second plane had hit the World Trade Center, confirming that a terrorist attack was underway. Card later recounted his story, saying that he whispered "A second plane hit the second tower. America is under attack."

On March 28, 2006, the White House announced that Card would resign as Chief of Staff and be replaced by United States Office of Management and Budget director Joshua B. Bolten. Card's resignation was effective April 14, 2006. At 5 years and 84 days, his tenure as Chief of Staff was the third-longest in the office's history.

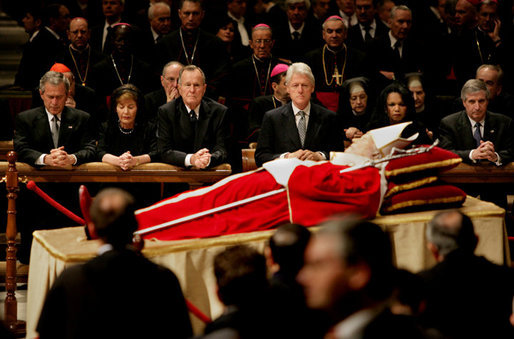
Card (far right), along with George W. Bush, Laura Bush, Bill Clinton, George H. W. Bush, and Condoleezza Rice pay their respects to Pope John Paul II before the pope's funeral.

=== Post-government career ===
Card received an honorary degree from the University of Massachusetts Amherst on May 25, 2007. While accepting the degree, Card was booed loudly by students and faculty who deplored the choice to bestow the honor.

Card considered running in the 2010 special election to fill the United States Senate seat held by Ted Kennedy, who had died in office. State Senator Scott Brown, who considered entering the race, promised to drop out if Card decided to run. Card announced on September 11, 2009, that he would not enter the race and that he was throwing his support to Brown, who went on to win the election.

On July 5, 2011, Card was named acting dean of The Bush School of Government and Public Service at Texas A&M University.

In 2014, Card was selected as the fifth president of Franklin Pierce University in Rindge, New Hampshire. He began his tenure in December 2014, and resigned in summer of 2016.

Since December 2023, Card has served as the chief executive officer of the George & Barbara Bush Foundation.

== Personal life ==
Card is married to Reverend Kathleene Card. They reside in Jaffrey, New Hampshire. They have three grown children and six grandchildren.

Political offices
| Preceded by Gwendolyn King | Director of the White House Office of Intergovernmental Affairs; 1988; Served alongside: Frank Donatelli (Political and Intergovernmental Affairs) | Succeeded by Karen Spencer |
| Preceded by M. B. Oglesby | White House Deputy Chief of Staff; 1989–1992 | Succeeded by Henson Moore |
| Preceded by Samuel K. Skinner | United States Secretary of Transportation; 1992–1993 | Succeeded by Federico Peña |
| Preceded by John Podesta | White House Chief of Staff; 2001–2006 | Succeeded by Joshua Bolten |
Academic offices
| Preceded by Ryan Crocker | Dean of the Bush School of Government and Public Service; Acting; 2011–2013 | Succeeded by Ryan Crocker |
| Preceded by James Birge | President of Franklin Pierce University; 2015–2016 | Succeeded by Kim Mooney |
U.S. order of precedence (ceremonial)
| Preceded by William Barr as Former U.S. Cabinet Member | Order of precedence of the United States as Former U.S. Cabinet Member | Succeeded by Barbara Franklin as Former U.S. Cabinet Member |
