= Kenneth Duberstein =

American lobbyist and businessman (1944–2022)

Ken Duberstein
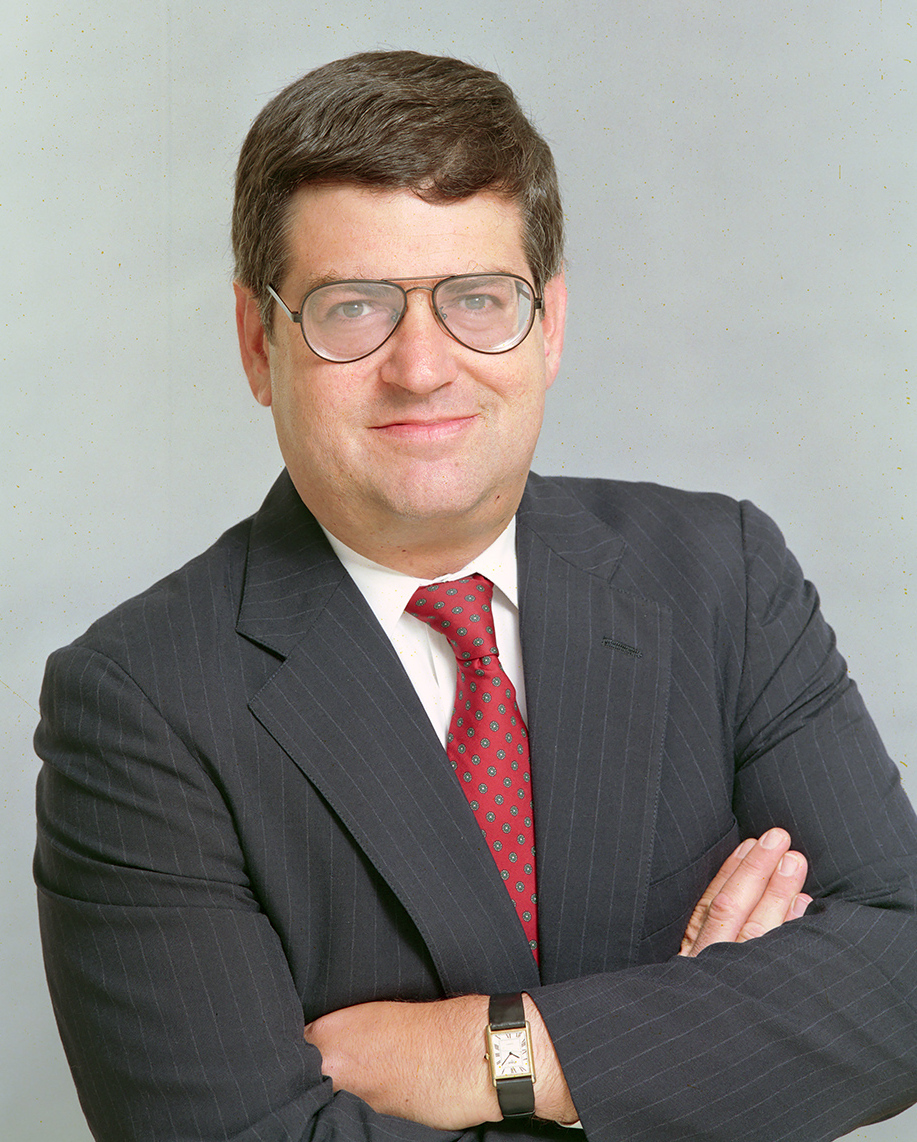
- Duberstein in 1987

13th White House Chief of Staff
- In office July 1, 1988 – January 20, 1989
- President: Ronald Reagan
- Deputy: M. B. Oglesby
- Preceded by: Howard Baker
- Succeeded by: John H. Sununu

White House Deputy Chief of Staff
- In office February 27, 1987 – July 1, 1988
- President: Ronald Reagan
- Preceded by: Michael Deaver
- Succeeded by: M. B. Oglesby

White House Director of Legislative Affairs
- In office January 2, 1982 – December 15, 1983
- President: Ronald Reagan
- Preceded by: Max Friedersdorf
- Succeeded by: M. B. Oglesby

Personal details
- Born: Kenneth Marc Duberstein; April 21, 1944 New York City, New York, U.S.
- Died: March 2, 2022 (aged 77) Washington, D.C., U.S.
- Party: Republican
- Spouses: Marjorie (divorced); Sydney (divorced); Jacqueline Fain
- Children: 4
- Education: Franklin and Marshall College (BA); American University (MA); New York Law School (attended)

Kenneth Marc Duberstein (April 21, 1944 – March 2, 2022) was an American lobbyist who served as U.S. president Ronald Reagan's White House chief of staff from 1988 to 1989.

== Early life and education ==
Duberstein was born to a Jewish family in Brooklyn, the son of Jewel (Falb), a teacher, and Aaron Duberstein, a fundraiser for the Boy Scouts of America. He graduated from Poly Prep Country Day School and Franklin and Marshall College (A.B. 1965) and American University (M.A. 1966). He received an honorary Doctor of Laws degree from Franklin and Marshall in 1989. He is a brother of Zeta Beta Tau.

== Political career ==
Duberstein began his public service on Capitol Hill as an intern for Senator Jacob K. Javits. His other early government service included Deputy Under Secretary of Labor during the Gerald Ford administration and Director of Congressional and Intergovernmental Affairs at the U.S. General Services Administration.

During Reagan's eight years in office, he had two stints in the White House. His first was as Deputy Assistant to the President for Legislative Affairs (1981–1983). His major accomplishment of this period was pushing Reagan's economic agenda through a Democratic House of Representatives, including the 1982 Tax Bill. Duberstein was described as Reagan's invisible link to Congress. He was at the center of the Administrations push for the bill, working on both sides of the political divide. His second stint was also for two years, first as Deputy Chief of Staff and then for the final six months of the Reagan presidency as White House Chief of Staff (1988–1989). Eight days after Reagan was on TV and acknowledged the Iran–Contra affair, Duberstein took over as chief of staff. Around that time, it was revealed that Nancy Reagan had used an astrologer to determine dates for the president's public appearances. Reagan's presidency had reached a low point; approval rating was at 37%. His promotion was called a wake-up call for a "drowsy White House". He came to the job with energy, loyalty, hard work and enthusiasm, having earned the nickname Duderdog; and he made sure to call Nancy twice a day. He had Reagan give a mea culpa address to the nation; poll numbers went right up and the presidency had been turned around.

Duberstein is said to have been the first Jewish person to be White House Chief of Staff.

Between his White House appointments, he was vice-president and director of Business-Government Relations of the Committee for Economic Development and was a lobbyist as vice president of Timmons & Company. Prior to 1987, he served on the Commission for the Preservation of America's Heritage Abroad, succeeded by Betty Heitman, previously co-chairwoman of the Republican National Committee.

== Later career ==
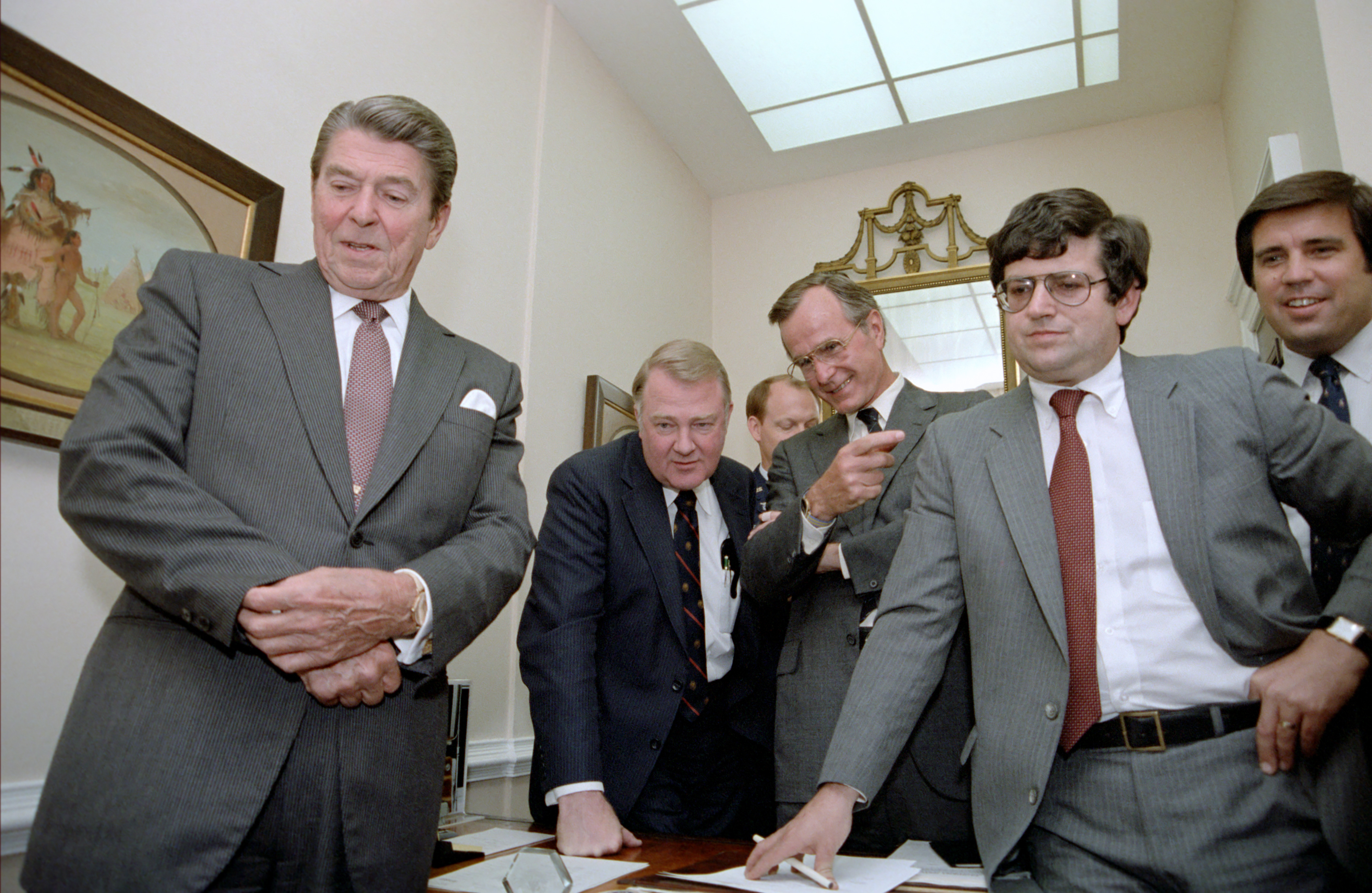
Duberstein with President Reagan watching the Tax Bill vote with staff in the White House, 19 August 1982

In January 1989, Duberstein was awarded the Presidential Citizens Medal by Reagan. He was the chairman of the Ethics Committee for the U.S. Olympic Committee and served as vice chairman of the independent Special Bid Oversight Reform Commission for the U.S. Olympics Committee. He also appeared on Bloomberg alongside John Podesta, and had 23 appearances on C-SPAN. Beginning in season five, Duberstein was a consultant for the TV show The West Wing.

In 2013, Duberstein was a signatory to an amicus curiae brief submitted to the United States Supreme Court in support of same-sex marriage in the Hollingsworth v. Perry case. His position succeeded, as the court would go on to effectively legalize same-sex marriage in California.

=== Lobbyist ===
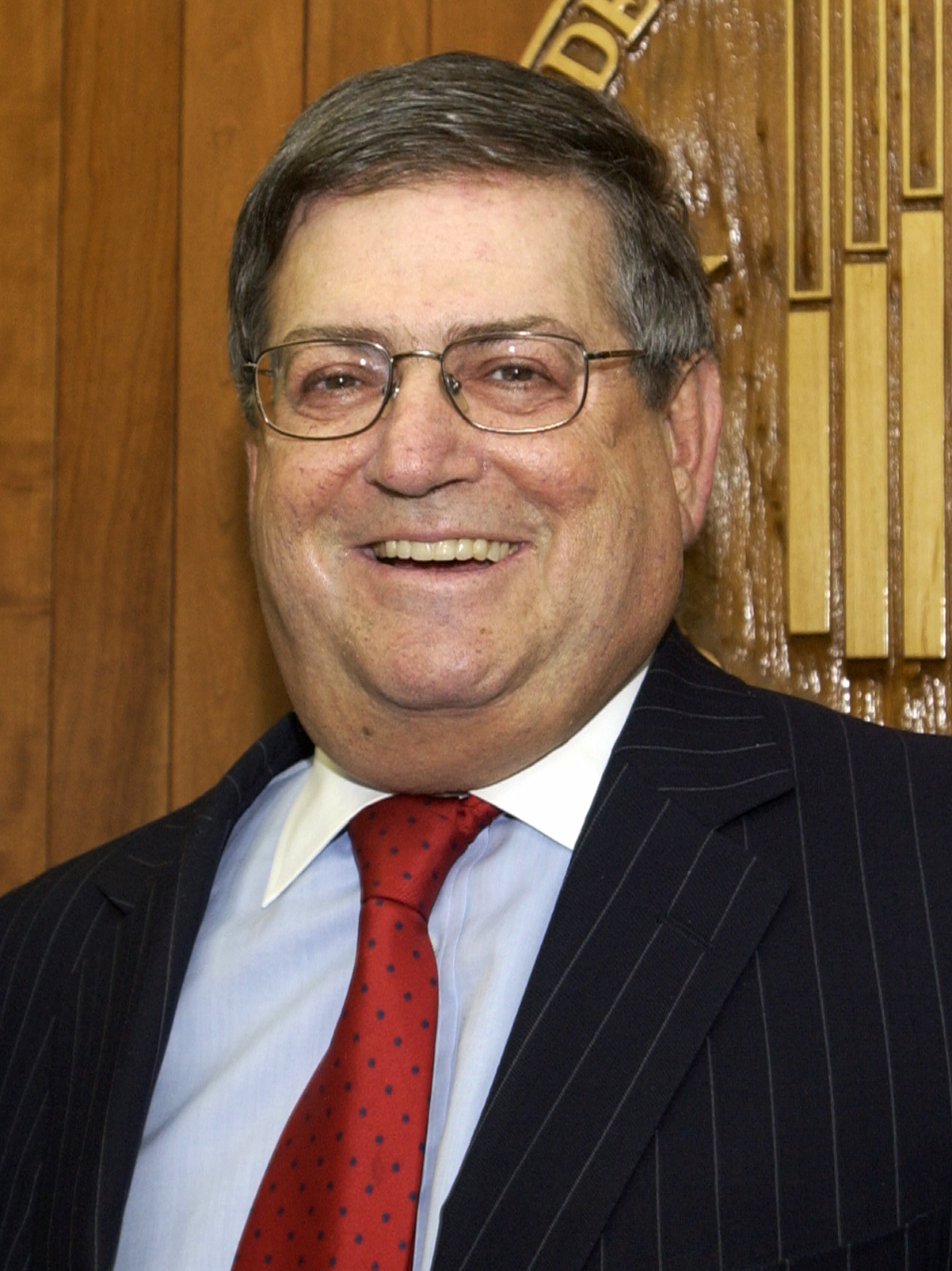
Duberstein in 2006

Duberstein transitioned from the White House to lobbyist; he was successful, and his insight and advice was sought by leaders of both parties. Duberstein founded The Duberstein Group Inc. in 1987. It is a consulting services company providing corporate consulting and government relations services. Among its client are Amazon, BP and MLB. Duberstein was hired by Russian authorities, via Goldman Sachs, to lobby against the Magnitsky Bill (as known as the Sergei Magnitsky Rule of Law Accountability Act), a bill in the U.S. Congress "to impose sanctions on persons responsible for the detention, abuse, or death of Sergei Magnitsky, and for other gross violations of human rights in the Russian Federation". Duberstein showed discretion and did not discuss his work, leading to an "air of mystery" about him and what he did for his clients.

=== Education activities ===
In 2020, he established the Public Service Internship Endowment at his alma mater, Franklin and Marshall, assisting F&M students who secure unpaid internships in public service in Washington, D.C. He was on the college's Board of Trustees from 1994 to 2010, and then became an emeritus trustee. A space at the Franklin and Marshall Patricia E. Harris Center for Business, Government and Public Policy is named for him, the "Duberstein West Wing". He spoke at the dedication of the center and led fund raising for the building's renovations. At Harvard Kennedy School, he chaired a senior advisory committee and was a “constant and inspiring presence” to students.

=== Political adviser ===
He was an adviser to former deputy secretary of state Richard Armitage, according to syndicated columnist Robert Novak, who said that Duberstein was a source for David Corn's and Michael Isikoff's book about the Valerie Plame affair in which Armitage was found to be the one who leaked Plame's CIA status to Novak.

Duberstein and Colin Powell became close during his time as chief of staff and Powell's position as National Security Advisor in the Reagan White House. When Powell considered a 1996 presidential run, he was advised by Duberstein. Duberstein guided him to "play the press" and win over Republican leaders. Powell ended up not making the run. When Powell's reputation was damaged by his role in the 2003 Iraq War, he used Duberstein to act as a consigliere to repair his name.

Duberstein guided Supreme Court justices David Souter and Clarence Thomas through their ritualistic confirmation proceedings. Other high level appointees he advised and guided through confirmation hearings included CIA director Robert M. Gates and Secretary of State George P. Shultz. His business partner, Michael S. Berman, a Democrat, performed similar tasks for Justices Ruth Bader Ginsburg and Stephen G. Breyer.

=== Boards ===
Duberstein enjoyed lucrative posts on countless boards of directors, including The Boeing Company, ConocoPhillips, the Fleming Companies, Inc., and The St. Paul Companies, Inc. He was also on the Board of Governors for the American Stock Exchange and NASD, and served on the Board of Directors of Fannie Mae. He served on the advisory board for Washington, DC–based non-profit America Abroad Media.

== Personality ==
Duberstein, a "back-slapping Brooklyn native," was one of the most connected Washington people. "A permanent Washington fixture," he was a regular at Washington parties and network talk shows.

A gregarious and rumpled, wise-cracking ‘people person’ of relentless optimism and energy...the consummate Washington insider and institutionalist, a big man with an easy smile and a generous laugh who could be hard-nosed, loved gossiping with reporters, believed in bipartisanship and offered his advice to anyone who asked – especially those who succeeded him in the chief of staff job.

Duberstein noted that as a Brooklynite he always enjoyed working with people. As a "cultivator" of the press he was generally discreet, refusing to be quoted by name, even for articles about himself. He was forever loved by the Washington press for all the leaking he did during the Reagan years; and, "he loved being Ken Duberstein."

== Political views ==
Duberstein was a politically moderate Rockefeller Republican, fiscally conservative and socially moderate. Before John McCain secured the 2008 Republican presidential nomination, Duberstein made inquiries about running the transition team; McCain was not interested. He later broke from his party in the general election and supported Barack Obama; commenting on the nomination of Sarah Palin for vice-president, he said: “Even at McDonald's, you’re interviewed three times before you’re given a job."

== Personal life, health and death ==
Duberstein was married three times, with his first two marriages, to Marjorie Duberstein and Sydney Duberstein, ending in divorce. He had a daughter from the first marriage and three children from the second. He was then married to Jacqueline Fain, a former TV producer, for 18 years until his death. At their 2003 wedding, Supreme Court Justice David Souter was the officiant and Marvin Hamlisch provided the music. He had a history of kidney disease, and in 2014, received a kidney transplant; his son was the donor. After a long illness, Duberstein died at Sibley Memorial Hospital in Washington on March 2, 2022, at the age of 77. The funeral was at Washington Hebrew Congregation

Political offices
Preceded by Max Friedersdorf	White House Director of Legislative Affairs; 1982–1983	Succeeded by M. B. Oglesby
Preceded by Howard Baker	White House Chief of Staff; 1988–1989	Succeeded by John H. Sununu
