= James F. Goodrich =

American government official

United States Under Secretary of the Navy
- In office September 29, 1981 – August 6, 1987
- Preceded by: Robert J. Murray
- Succeeded by: Henry L. Garrett III

Personal details
- Born: January 24, 1913 Fennville, Michigan, U.S.
- Died: July 16, 2012 (aged 99) Falmouth, Maine, U.S.
- Education: University of Michigan
- Occupation: diplomat

James Franklin Goodrich (1913 – 2012) was the United States Under Secretary of the Navy from 1981 to 1987.

== Biography ==
Goodrich was born on January 24, 1913, in Fennville, Michigan and educated in Jackson, Michigan. After high school, he attended the Department of Naval Architecture and Marine Engineering at the University of Michigan, receiving his B.S. in 1937. After graduating, he worked on Gulf Oil tankers for two years, and then spent a year as a machinist for Bethlehem Steel in Sparrows Point, Maryland.

Goodrich took a job with Todd Pacific Shipyards in Tacoma, Washington in 1940, and by 1943–45 served as chief engineer. In 1945, he was transferred to Seattle, Washington, where he worked as general superintendent and then as assistant general manager. In 1956, he was promoted to general manager of Todd Shipyards' Los Angeles division.

After 16 years with Todd Pacific Shipyards, in 1964, he left to become executive vice president of Bath Industries, Inc. The next year, Bath Industries changed its name to Congoleum Corp. in 1965 and Goodrich took over as its president and chief executive officer, a position he held until 1975. From 1975 to 1978, Goodrich was chairman of the board of directors of Bath Iron Works.

On September 9, 1981, President of the United States Ronald Reagan nominated Goodrich as Under Secretary of the Navy. Goodrich was sworn in as Under Secretary on September 29, 1981, and held this office until August 6, 1987.

He died July 16, 2012.

Government offices
Preceded by Robert J. Murray	Under Secretary of the Navy; September 29, 1981 – August 6, 1987	Succeeded by Henry L. Garrett III
