= United States Navy bureau system =

U.S. Navy materiel-support organization 1842-1966

The "bureau system" of the United States Navy was the Department of the Navy's materiel-support organization from 1842 through 1966. The bureau chiefs were largely autonomous, reporting directly to the Secretary of the Navy and managing their respective organizations without the influence of other bureaus. In 1966, most of the bureaus (with the exception of the Bureau of Medicine and Surgery and the Bureau of Naval Personnel) were gradually replaced by unified commands (generally known as "systems commands" or SYSCOMs) reporting to the Chief of Naval Operations.

== Before the bureaus ==
For the first several decades of the Navy Department's existence, all procurement and materiel matters were handled directly by the Office of the Secretary of the Navy. As the navy expanded during the War of 1812, it became clear that this system was not sufficient for the service's needs.

On February 7, 1815, Congress established a three-member Board of Naval Commissioners to handle materiel-support matters. As part of the navy secretary's office, the board's jurisdiction generally extended only logistical matters such as supply and construction. The Secretary of the Navy remained in control of many operational aspects of the navy.

== Establishment of the bureau system, 1842 ==
Ultimately, the Board system was unable to provide the navy with the necessary technical and management control. Among other things, naval technology was becoming increasingly complex during the first half of the 19th century, and required more specialized oversight. In the early 1840s, Congress decided to abolish the Board of Naval Commissioners and replace them with a more specialized bureaucracy based on broad functional areas such as shipbuilding.

The first five bureaus were established by Act of Congress on August 31, 1842. They were the:

- Bureau of Naval Yards and Docks
- Bureau of Construction, Equipment, and Repairs;
- Bureau of Provisions and Clothing;
- Bureau of Ordnance and Hydrography; and
- Bureau of Medicine and Surgery

== Reorganization, 1862 ==
The system was reorganized during the early years of the Civil War. By an act of Congress of July 5, 1862 (12 Stat. 510), the existing bureaus were reorganized and increased to eight. As reorganized, these included the:

- Bureau of Yards and Docks;
- Bureau of Provisions and Clothing;
- Bureau of Ordnance (BuOrd);
- Bureau of Equipment and Recruiting;
- Bureau of Construction and Repair (C&R);
- Bureau of Steam Engineering (later the Bureau of Engineering);
- Bureau of Navigation (BuNav); and
- Bureau of Medicine and Surgery

== Late 19th century through World War II ==
The bureau system dominated the navy's procurement for the rest of the 19th century and into the World War II years. There were a few changes, often brought about by changes in technology or changing missions.

The increasing role of naval aviation, for example, led Congress in 1921 to consolide technical authority under a new Bureau of Aeronautics (BuAer), with responsibility for the procurement of naval aircraft. Previously, this responsibility had been divided among several other navy bureaus.

Other changes were more superficial, as in 1892 when the Bureau of Provisions and Clothing was renamed the Bureau of Supplies and Accounts (BuSandA).

World War II brought about several other changes. The Bureau of Ships (BuShips) was established in 1940, through the merger of the Bureau of Construction and Repair and the Bureau of Engineering. In 1942, the Bureau of Navigation was renamed the Bureau of Naval Personnel (BuPers), to reflect its change in mission.

== Post-World War II through the 1960s ==
By the postwar period, the following bureaus were in existence:

- Bureau of Yards and Docks;
- Bureau of Supplies and Accounts;
- Bureau of Naval Weapons which merged BuAer and BuOrd due to technological overlap regarding cruise missiles;
- Bureau of Ships;
- Bureau of Naval Personnel; and
- Bureau of Medicine and Surgery

The bureaus' traditional autonomy became hard to maintain after World War II, with the armed services' greater emphasis on "jointness." The complexity of post-war weapons systems was promoting a "systems engineering" approach—an approach that did not fit well with the bureau systems' semi-independence. Other problems related to jurisdiction; the Bureau of Aeronautics' work on unmanned aircraft, for example, overlapped to some degree with the Bureau of Ordnance's work on guided missiles. This particular controversy was resolved in 1959 with the establishment of the Bureau of Naval Weapons (BuWeps), which merged BuAer and BuOrd.

The bureau system largely came to an end in the mid-1960s, in the midst of the Defense Department's overhaul of its entire planning and budgeting system. The bureaus were replaced with "systems commands," or SYSCOMs, which consolidated their functions into broader "systems." The Bureau of Naval Weapons, for example, was replaced by the Naval Air Systems Command, with responsibility for all aircraft, aerial weapons, and related systems, and by the Naval Ordnance Systems Command. BuShips was replaced with the Naval Ship Systems Command (which was later combined with the Naval Ordnance Systems Command to form the Naval Sea Systems Command), with responsibility for all naval shipbuilding. With modifications, the systems-command model remains in place today.

The two non-materiel bureaus, Bureau of Naval Personnel and Bureau of Medicine and Surgery, are still in existence.

== Coordination of bureaus ==
The first body to be charged with the coordination of the bureaus, in 1908, was the General Board of the United States Navy. The General Board had the advantage of being staffed with experienced former line officers and of being charged with determining long term naval requirements and policy. The disadvantage of the General Board was that it functioned in an advisory capacity only and it lacked a technical staff to verify bureau decisions. Ultimately, there were several cases of failures of coordination between bureaus, with three between 1938 and 1943 having major implications:

- The Iowa class battleship design, in which C&R designed a lighter more compact hull for speed and BuOrd somehow dropped its paper study for a matching turret and proceeded with a design for a larger turret using guns from canceled 1922-era battleships and battlecruisers. As naval historian Norman Friedman has recounted:

For some reason neither bureau understood that ship and turret could not go together. That became obvious only when plans for both were virtually complete, in November [1938]. The General Board was incredulous...A member of the board asked the chief of BuOrd whether it did not occur to him, "as a matter of common sense," that C&R was vitally interested in which turret he was developing...Very fortunately BuOrd was able to save the day by developing a new lightweight 50-caliber gun, whose smaller outside diameter permitted installation in a turret of the required dimensions. Remarkably, there were no reprisals.

- Upon delivery of the Sims class destroyer USS Anderson to the Navy in May 1939 it was discovered that the high pressure steam plant designed by BuEng was too heavy for the hull designed by C&R, by 150 tons. The metacentric height was insufficient, which resulted in a higher risk of capsizing. Corrections to this class included removal of top weight from the superstructure (including guns and torpedo tubes) and adding ballasting lower in the hull. This time there were repercussions: the chiefs of the two bureaus were ultimately fired by Acting Secretary of the Navy Charles Edison, and Congress merged the two bureaus into BuShips in 1940.
- The 1940-1943 design of the Sumner class destroyers was protracted as conflicting requirements were repeatedly considered. The resulting design was more than satisfactory, but there was a widespread impression that the General Board had been indecisive.

In 1945 the Office of the Chief of Naval Operations / OpNav created the Ship Characteristics Board / SCB to supplant and eventually replace the General Board as the body coordinating the bureaus' design activities. The SCB had the advantages of direct OpNav authority and of specialized staff who could spend more time on design work, but it lacked the long range planning role of the General Board. The SCB role as a coordinator faded after the bureaus were reconstituted as System Commands and all were moved under the direct authority of OpNav in 1966. In the 1980s it was revived as the Ship Characteristics Improvement Board (SCIB), but without its former authority.

In 1942 the Office of Procurement and Material was created to coordinate procurement activities among the bureaus. The Office of Procurement and Material would undergo several changes of name until it was merged into the System Commands in 1985. At this time the Office of Naval Acquisition Support was established to create acquisition support for functions that span across Commands, and that require a degree of independence in their operations.

== See also ==
- Board of Naval Commissioners

Successor Commands

- Naval Air Systems Command
- Naval Sea Systems Command which merged Naval Ships Systems Command and Naval Ordnance Systems Command
- Space and Naval Warfare Systems Command
- Naval Facilities Engineering Command and later Naval Facilities Engineering Systems Command
- Naval Supply Systems Command
