= Indian Head Naval Surface Warfare Center =

United States naval military installation in Charles County, Maryland

Naval Support Facility Indian Head
- Part of Naval Support Activity South Potomac
- Near Indian Head, Maryland in the United States
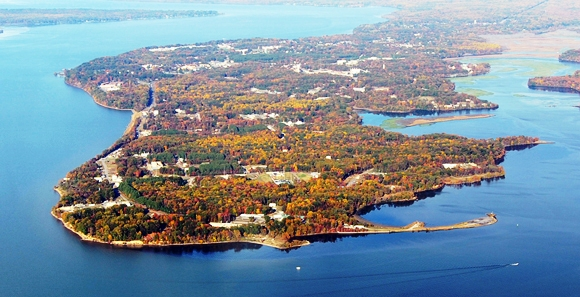
- An aerial view of NSF Indian Head

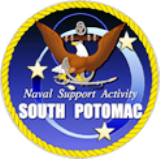

Site information
- Type: Naval Support Facility and military proving ground
- Owner: Department of Defense
- Operator: US Navy
- Controlled by: Naval District Washington
- Condition: Operational
- Website: Official website

Location
- Location in Maryland Location in the United States
- Coordinates: 38°35′18.88″N 77°10′9.12″W

Site history
- Built: 1890
- In use: 1890 – present

Garrison information
- Current commander: Captain Steve Duba
- Garrison: Naval Surface Warfare Center Indian Head Division

Naval Surface Warfare Center, Indian Head Division (NSWC IHD) is a United States Navy installation in Charles County, Maryland. Part of Naval Sea Systems Command (NAVSEA), it is one of ten divisions of the Naval Surface Warfare Center (NSWC). Its mission is to research, develop, test, evaluate, and produce energetics (i.e., explosives, propellants, pyrotechnics, reactive materials, related chemicals and fuels and their application in propulsion systems and ordnance).

The U.S. Navy's presence in Indian Head dates to 1890, when the Bureau of Ordnance dispatched Robert B. Dashiell to establish a naval ordnance center. Dashiell served as Inspector in Charge of Ordnance there from 1890 to 1893. During World War I, the facility served as Naval Proving Ground, Indian Head.

It is the United States Department of Defense (DoD)'s largest full-spectrum energetics facility. It employs more than 1,900 people, including more than 850 are scientists, engineers, and technicians that develop and sustain explosives, propellants, pyrotechnics, high-energy chemicals, and their application to weapons. In addition, NSWC Indian Head has the NSWC's largest concentration of Ph.Ds working in energetics, including the highest number of synthetic chemists, detonation physicists, and formulation scientists.

The Division pursues basic research, applied technology, technology demonstration, prototyping, engineering development, acquisition, low-rate production, in-service engineering/mishaps and failure investigations, surveillance, and demilitarization.

As the U.S. Navy’s lead technical authority in the United States, NSWC Indian Head performs more than 60% of all Navy energetics workload, and has an unmatched record of 13 Navy-qualified explosives used in 47 Navy, Army, Air Force, and Marine Corps weapons. Seventy-five percent of all explosives deployed in U.S. weapons were developed by NSWC Indian Head.

The main site for NSWC IHD is at Naval Support Facility Indian Head, a 3,500-acre peninsula along the Potomac River in southern Maryland, at the southern terminus of Indian Head Highway. It also has operations in McAlester, Oklahoma; Colts Neck, New Jersey; Ogden, Utah; Louisville, Kentucky, and Picatinny, New Jersey.

== Capabilities ==
- Energetic Systems Research Development Test & Evaluation (RDT&E), Acquisition Engineering (AE), In-Service Engineering (ISE) and Sustainment
- Energetic Systems and Material Scale-up, Manufacture and Manufacturing Technology
- Cartridge Actuated Devices, Cutters, Sounding and Specialty Devices (RDT&E), AE, ISE, Sustainment, and Manufacturing
- Weapon Simulators, Trainers, Training, Test and Diagnostic Equipment (RDT&E), AE, ISE, and Sustainment
- Energetic Safety, Environmental Technology, Logistics, and PHST (Packaging, Handling, Storage and Transportation) RDT&E, AE, ISE and Sustainment
- Conventional Ammunition Engineering and Sustainment
- Gun Systems ISE, T&E, and Integrated Logistics Support (ILS)
- Naval EOD Technology Division
