= James P. Downey =

U.S. Navy flag officer

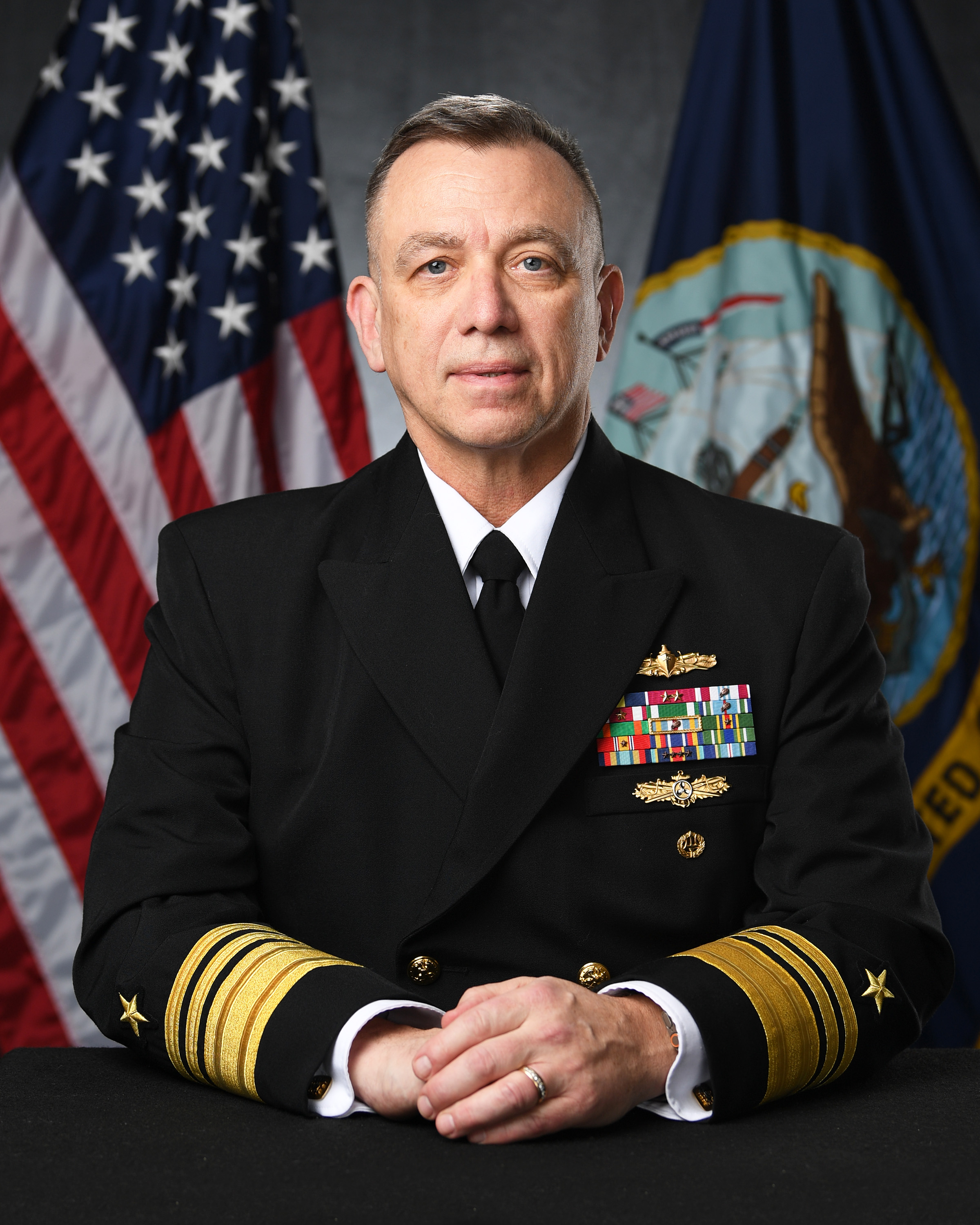
- Official portrait, 2024
- Born: 1964 (age 61–62); New York, U.S.
- Military career
- Allegiance: United States
- Branch: United States Navy
- Service years: 1987–2026
- Rank: Vice Admiral
- Commands: Naval Sea Systems Command; Navy Regional Maintenance Center
- Awards: Navy Distinguished Service Medal; Legion of Merit (2)

James Peter Downey (born 1964) is a retired United States Navy vice admiral who served as the commander of Naval Sea Systems Command from 3 January 2024 to 6 August 2026. He served as the program executive officer for aircraft carriers from 2019 to 2023.

Raised in New York state, Downey graduated from the University at Albany, SUNY with a B.S. degree in economics and computer science in 1986. He was commissioned as an ensign in 1987. Downey later earned an M.S. degree in computer science from the Naval Postgraduate School in 1997.

In April 2023, Downey was nominated for promotion to vice admiral and appointment as commander of the Naval Sea Systems Command.

Downey served in the dual-hatted role as Commander, Naval Sea Systems Command (NAVSEA) and as Portfolio Acquisition Executive Industrial Operations (PAE IO) until 6 August 2026. This was Downey's last command position before retiring from the Navy.

Military offices
Preceded by William J. Galinis	Deputy Commander for Surface Warfare of the Naval Sea Systems Command and Commander of the Navy Regional Maintenance Center; 2016–2019	Succeeded by Thomas J. Anderson
Preceded by Brian K. Antonio	Program Executive Officer for Aircraft Carriers of the United States Navy; 2019–2023	Succeeded by Casey J. Moton
Preceded by Thomas J. Anderson; Acting	Commander of Naval Sea Systems Command; 2023–2026	Succeeded by Pete Small
