= Admiral Fowler =

Admiral Fowler may refer to:

- Earl B. Fowler Jr. (1925–2008), U.S. Navy vice admiral
- Jeffrey Fowler (born 1956), U.S. Navy vice admiral
- Joe Fowler (1894–1993), U.S. Navy rear admiral
