= United States Navy systems commands =

Materiel agencies of the United States Department of the Navy

The systems commands, abbreviated as SysCom or SYSCOM, are the materiel agencies of the United States Department of the Navy, responsible for the design, construction, and maintenance of military systems such as ships, aircraft, facilities, and weapons. The systems commands replaced the Navy bureau system in 1966 and report to the assistant secretary of the Navy for research, development and acquisition. The current Navy systems commands are:

- Naval Sea Systems Command (NAVSEA)
- Naval Air Systems Command (NAVAIR)
- Naval Information Warfare Systems Command (NAVWAR) (formerly SPAWAR),
- Naval Facilities Engineering Systems Command (NAVFAC)
- Naval Supply Systems Command (NAVSUP)
- Marine Corps Systems Command (MCSC)

The Office of Naval Research is sometimes grouped with the systems commands, although it has a different mission geared towards scientific research rather than weapon systems development and acquisition.

== Function and organization ==
Each of the systems commands provides full life-cycle support for a specific category of military hardware or software, including research and development, design, procurement, testing, repair, and in-service engineering and logistics support. NAVSEA is concerned with ships and submarines, NAVAIR naval aircraft, NAVWAR information technology, NAVFAC facilities and expeditionary, NAVSUP supply chain management, and MCSC the specific equipment of the Marine Corps.

While each systems command is directly subordinate in the military chain of command to the chief of naval operations (or, in the case of MCSC, the commandant of the Marine Corps), the rank of their commanders varies. As of 2014, NAVAIR and NAVSEA are each led by a Vice Admiral; NAVWAR, NAVFAC, and NAVSUP are each led by a Rear Admiral; and MCSC is led by a Brigadier General. In addition, the commanders of NAVFAC and NAVSUP are the highest-ranking members of two of the eight Navy staff corps, the Civil Engineer Corps and Supply Corps respectively, while all the other commanders are line officers. Ultimate responsibility for procurement lies with the civilian Assistant Secretary of the Navy (Research, Development and Acquisition) in the Department of the Navy through several Program Executive Officers. Each oversees a specific acquisition program such as PEO Aircraft Carriers or PEO Joint Strike Fighter through operational agreements with the systems commands.

Some of the systems commands contain "warfare centers" directed towards Research, Development, Test & Evaluation (RDT&E) of the systems procured by their parent systems commands. These are the Naval Air Warfare Center (in NAVAIR), Naval Surface Warfare Center, Naval Undersea Warfare Center (both in NAVSEA), NAVFAC Engineering and Expeditionary Warfare Center (EXWC), and Naval Information Warfare Center, Naval Command, Control and Ocean Surveillance Center (in NAVWAR). The systems commands also fund external research by small businesses through the Navy portion of the Small Business Innovation Research program.

== History ==
In 1966, the four Navy materiel bureaus were disestablished and replaced with six systems commands:

- Bureau of Yards and Docks was replaced with Naval Facilities Engineering Command (NAVFAC)
- Bureau of Supplies and Accounts was replaced with Naval Supply Systems Command (NAVSUP)
- Bureau of Naval Weapons was replaced with Naval Ordnance Systems Command (NAVORD) and Naval Air Systems Command (NAVAIR)
- Bureau of Ships was replaced with Naval Ship Systems Command (NAVSHIPS) and Naval Electronic Systems Command (NAVELEX)

Naval Material Command was also created as an umbrella organization for the new agencies.

In 1974, NAVORD and NAVSHIPS were merged into Naval Sea Systems Command (NAVSEA). In 1985, Naval Material Command was disestablished, placing the systems commands directly under the chief of naval operations; an Office of Naval Acquisition Support was established to create acquisition support for functions that spanned across Commands, and which required a degree of independence in their operations. At the same time, NAVELEX became Space and Naval Warfare Systems Command (SPAWAR), expanding its traditional command, control, and communications focus into undersea surveillance and space systems. In 2019, SPAWAR was renamed to Naval Information Warfare Systems Command (NAVWAR).

Marine Corps Research, Development and Acquisition Command (MCRDAC) was established in 1987, and in 1992 it changed its name to Marine Corps Systems Command (MCSC). In the 1990s it picked up several programs from Headquarters Marine Corps as well as the Assault Amphibious Vehicle program from NAVSEA.

== See also ==
U.S. Armed Forces systems commands

- Army Materiel Command
- Air Force Materiel Command
- Space Systems Command
