= Paul D. Stroop =

United States Navy Vice Admiral (1904–1995)

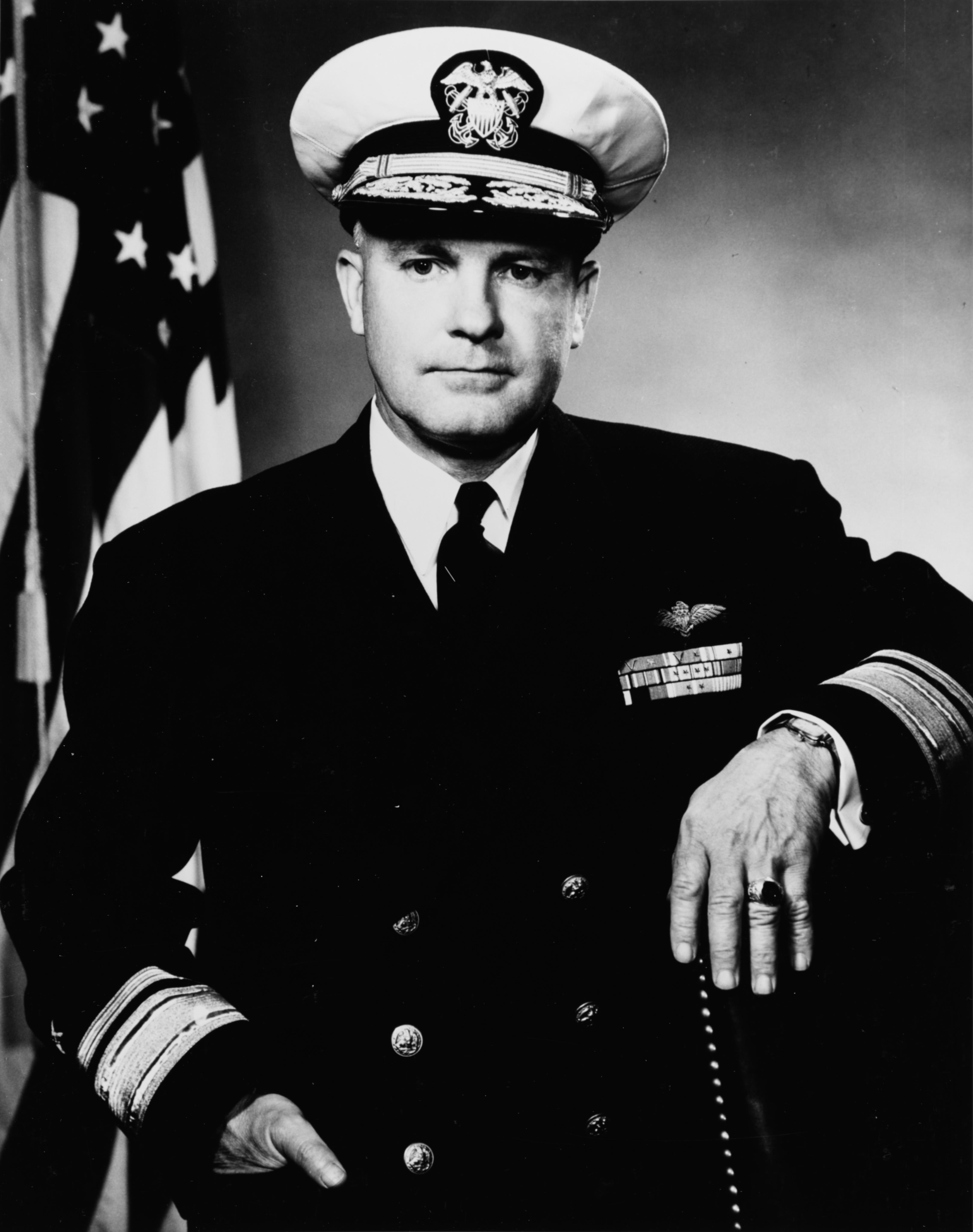
- Paul D. Stroop as a Rear Admiral in 1954
- Born: 30 October 1904; Zanesville, Ohio
- Died: 17 May 1995 (aged 90); Coronado, California
- Military career
- Allegiance: United States
- Branch: United States Navy
- Service years: 1926–1965
- Rank: Vice Admiral
- Commands: USS Mackinac (AVP-13); USS Croatan (CVE-25); USS Princeton (CV-37); USS Essex (CV-9); Naval Ordnance Test Station, China Lake; Taiwan Patrol Force; Bureau of Naval Weapons; Naval Air Force, Pacific Fleet
- Conflicts: World War II; Korean War
- Awards: Legion of Merit (2)

Vice Admiral Paul David Stroop (30 October 1904 – 17 May 1995) was an officer of the United States Navy and a Naval Aviator. He held numerous high-ranking staff positions in aviation from the 1930s onward, including World War II service on the staff of the Chief of Naval Operations. During the late 1940s and early 1950s, he held various sea commands. From 1959 to 1962, he oversaw the development of the Navy's aerial weapons, including early guided missiles, as chief of the Bureau of Naval Weapons. During the later 1960s, he commanded Naval air forces in the Pacific.

== Biography ==
=== Early life and career ===
Stroop was born in Zanesville, Ohio on October 30, 1904 as the only child of John Hoover Stroop and Margaret Stroop. When Stroop was 12, the family moved to Mobile, Alabama. His father was in ill health and felt a milder climate would be a better place to live.

Stroop went to high school in Mobile and graduated in 1921. He was appointed to the United States Naval Academy by the local congressman from Mobile, John McDuffie. He then did some preparatory work at Werntz's preparatory school in Annapolis, sometimes referred to as "Bobby's War College."

Stroop had good results on his entrance examinations and was to report to the Naval Academy on June 12, 1922. However, two-thirds through the physical examinations, one of the doctors approached him and marked on his slip a giant circle around his height, which showed 63 and a half inches, and wrote "NO" next to it. So he did not get accepted that day.

However, Stroop did not give up. The next day he went directly to the Navy Department and spoke to the Surgeon General, who with a quick physical examination, approved him a waiver. He wanted Stroop to promise to grow if he could, so he promised he would.

He reported back to the Naval Academy on June 15, 1922 and was sworn in.

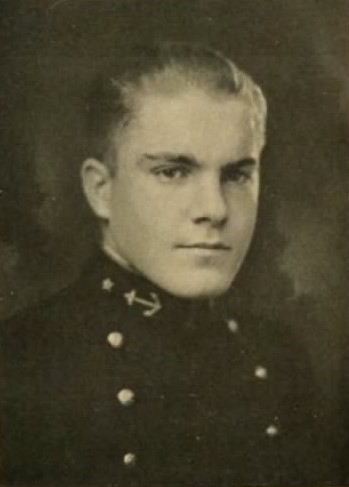
Paul. D. Stroop in the U.S. Naval Academy yearbook the year he graduated, 1926. Annapolis, Maryland

Stroop excelled in his studies and graduated as rank 20 in his class out of 456 graduates. He graduated from the United States Naval Academy in 1926.

Stroop's dedication in US. Naval Academy yearbook for 1926 shows how highly regarded he was amongst his class.

"Since his entrance he has applied himself diligently and has firmly established himself as one of the more brilliant luminaries in our N.A. constellation. Nor has he confined his efforts to the Academics entirely. He has gained for himself no little fame as a gymnast. He can do all manner of delightfully clever and thrilling stunts on any of the gym apparatus and has featured prominently in more than one Intercollegiate meet. Naturally savvy and hard working, he is a boon to his wooden classmates and has saved more than one man for the Navy by his extra instruction in which is administers impartially to all who care to partake. A true friend and a real man, he'll be hard to beat as shipmate or an officer."

— U.S. Naval Academy, Yearbook 1926, Source Military Yearbooks Collection

Stroop then spent the next two years on board the battleship Arkansas (BB-33) as plotting room officer and later initiated into fleet gunnery assignments.

In 1928, he served as a member of U.S. gymnastic team at the Olympic Games in Amsterdam.

=== Naval aviation assignments ===
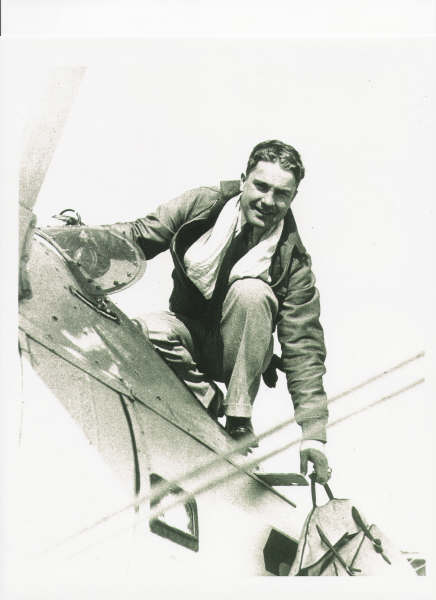
Paul D. Stroop early 1930s US. Naval Aviation Assignment

From 1928 to 1929, Stroop received flight training at Naval Air Station Pensacola, Florida, and in 1929 received his wings as a Naval Aviator. His first aviation assignment was with Torpedo Squadron 9, based at NAS Norfolk, Virginia. In 1931, he participated in the tests of the Norden bombsight against the U.S.S. Pittsburgh in the Chesapeake Bay. In 1932 he was transferred to Patrol Squadron 10, also based at Norfolk.

In May 1932, as a young Lieutenant, Stroop rescued a critically ill seaman from an oil tanker in mid-ocean by Navy seaplane. He braved the dangers of a tropical storm to take a critically ill man from a choppy sea and deliver him to a hospital.

From 1932 to 1934, he undertook postgraduate work at the Naval Academy. After completing his studies, he returned to Fleet assignments. He served from 1934 to 1936 with Bombing Squadron 5, aboard the carrier Ranger (CV-4). From 1936 to 1937, he was Senior Aviator aboard the cruiser Portland (CA-33). In 1937, Stroop gained his first experience in the Naval Aviation material establishment when he was assigned to the Navy's Bureau of Aeronautics (BuAer). He left BuAer in 1940 to join the staff of Admiral Aubrey Fitch, commander of Patrol Wing 2, based at Pearl Harbor, Hawaii. In 1940, Stroop became Flag Officer and Tactical Officer of Carrier Division 1 at San Diego.

=== World War II ===
After the United States entry into World War II, Stroop was transferred to Pearl Harbor. In 1942, he joined the staff of the Carrier Task Force, aboard Lexington (CV-2) at Pearl Harbor.

=== Battle of the Coral Sea ===
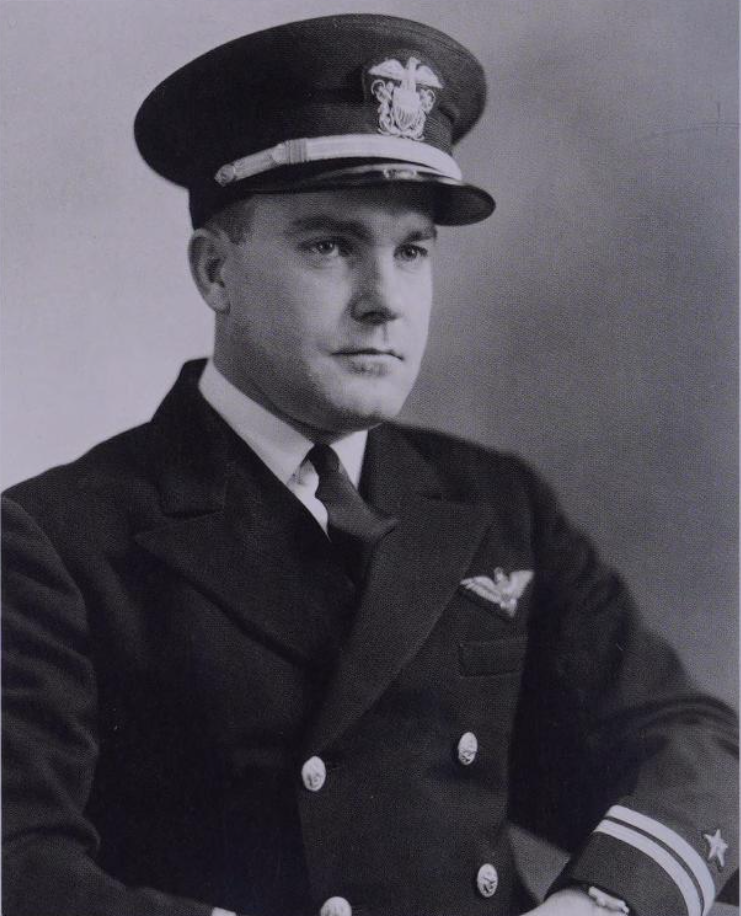
Lieutenant Paul D. Stroop as staff officer aboard the carrier USS Lexington

In April 1942, Stroop served as flag secretary, tactical officer, navigator, and also assumed the role of intelligence officer aboard the USS Lexington under Admiral Fitch. The Lexington departed Pearl Harbor to join the Yorktown and Australian forces to counter Japanese movements near New Guinea. Although unaware at first that a carrier battle was imminent, intelligence traffic from Pearl Harbor indicated growing enemy presence.

Stroop was responsible for summarizing incoming intelligence and briefing Admiral Fitch every morning. On May 6, concerned about the refueling course interfering with battle positioning, he orchestrated a gradual overnight course change to align the task force closer to expected Japanese movements.

On May 7, U.S. forces located and sank the Japanese light carrier Shoho. Stroop recalled that later that evening, Japanese planes mistook the Lexington for one of their own because of the heavy cloud cover and attempted to land. After some initial confusion, the crew of the Lexington opened fire. However, none made contact.

"These planes were in very good formation. I remember noticing the port running lights of the formation all in a beautiful echelon. One of the things that struck me as odd was that the red color of the port running light was different from the shade of running lights that we had on our own planes. They had sort of a bluish tint, red-blue tint to it."

— Paul D. Stroop, The Reminiscences of Vice Adm. Paul D. Stroop USN (Ret.)

On May 8, U.S. scouts located the carriers Shokaku and Zuikaku and both sides send air attacks. In addition to multiple torpedo hits, the Lexington took three bomb hits, one in the port gun gallery, which exploded and killed gun units in that area.

After the battle, Stroop went to investigate that area, and noted that the bomb started a fire down in the officers' area, the next deck below. The flag officer's living quarter's were set on fire and killed a couple of stewards in the pantry in that area.

Stroop gathered a lot of information from this battle about the amount of inflammable things on the board. The furniture in the admiral's cabin, was wood and fabric, and paint all over the ship had an oil base. They also learned that the fire-fighting equipment was not adequate and fog was needed instead of solid water. Stroop would take these lessons to heart and implement preventative fire measures on all of his incursions thereafter.

Stroop plotted a course to Brisbane to repair damage. However, around 2:00 PM, leaking fuel from the bomb hits caused a loud, submerged explosion that started accelerated fires and forced the engineering crew to shut down the main engines. This left the Lexington without any fire fighting capability, prompting evacuation.

Stroop stayed aboard with Admiral Fitch and senior staff until the last moment, being one of the last off the ship. It was dark at this time and the other rescue boats had left. Stroop silhouetted himself against the edge of the flight deck and attracted the attention of a nearby cruiser. With a searchlight on him, he semaphored the message "Send boat for admiral."

The cruiser named the Minneapolis came immediately over and Stroop scaled down side of the carrier on rope into the rescue boat. They made it onto the deck of the Minneapolis, just before a massive explosion engulfed the Lexington in flames.

The whole number-two elevator, right abeam of the island, lifted out of the ship. There was a solid mass of flame the size of the elevator that went as high as the mast of the ship. The whole bridge area broke out in flames and Stroop noted it looked quite spectacular, silhouetted against the night sky. As the aircraft began to burn, the ammunition cooked off, and the night sky was filled with tracers coming up off the dark of the Lexington in addition to the fire clear to the top of the mast.

Following the battle, Stroop compiled the official Coral Sea action report under Admiral Fitch, based largely on his personal observations, to be sent to Admiral Nimitz's headquarters in Pearl Harbor. The survivors reconvened from several rescue ships in Noumea Harbor and from there, took various ships to reconvene in Tongatapu in the Friendly Islands. Several days were spent here and Stroop borrowed and airplane and did some flying among the island.

=== Post Battle ===
After several days, the transport Chester took the admiral's staff back to San Diego briefly to replenish their lost clothes and supplies, before being ordered to Pearl Harbor for action on June 4, 1942. However, the Chester did not make it to Midway in time to participate. Halfway between San Diego and Honolulu, it was obvious they would not make it in time, so they pulled straight into Pearl Harbor. This caused a lot of local interest because people assumed they were returning from the Battle of Midway.

Admiral Fitch was assigned the task of taking charge of all Pacific Fleet Air Operations to become Commander Air Force Pacific Fleet. During this time, Admiral Fitch was called to Washington D.C. to make some reports and Stroop was picked to go with him.

He next gained his own command, serving from 1943 to 1944 as Commanding Officer of the seaplane tender USS Mackinac (AVP-13). Stroop spent the last months of the war in Washington, D.C., serving from 1944 to 1945 in the Navy Department as Aviation Plans Officer on the Staff of Fleet Admiral Ernest J. King, the Chief of Naval Operations and Commander in Chief, U.S. Fleet. In this capacity, Stroop attended the Yalta, Quebec, and Potsdam Conferences, later making a trip around the world to inform commands of the outcome of the Yalta Conference.

=== Post-war activities ===
In 1945, Stroop left the Navy Department to become Commanding Officer of the escort carrier Croatan (CVE-25). He served as Fleet Aviation Officer (later Chief of Staff, Operations), in the Fifth Fleet, based at Yokosuka, Japan, from 1945 to 1946, and then as Aviation Officer (later Assistant Chief of Staff) Operations to the Commander in Chief of the Pacific Fleet (CINCPACFLT), at Pearl Harbor, in 1946-1948.

From 1948 to 1950, Stroop served as Executive Officer at the Navy's General Line School in Monterey, California, then again took up his own studies as a student at the National War College at Washington, D.C., in 1950-1951.

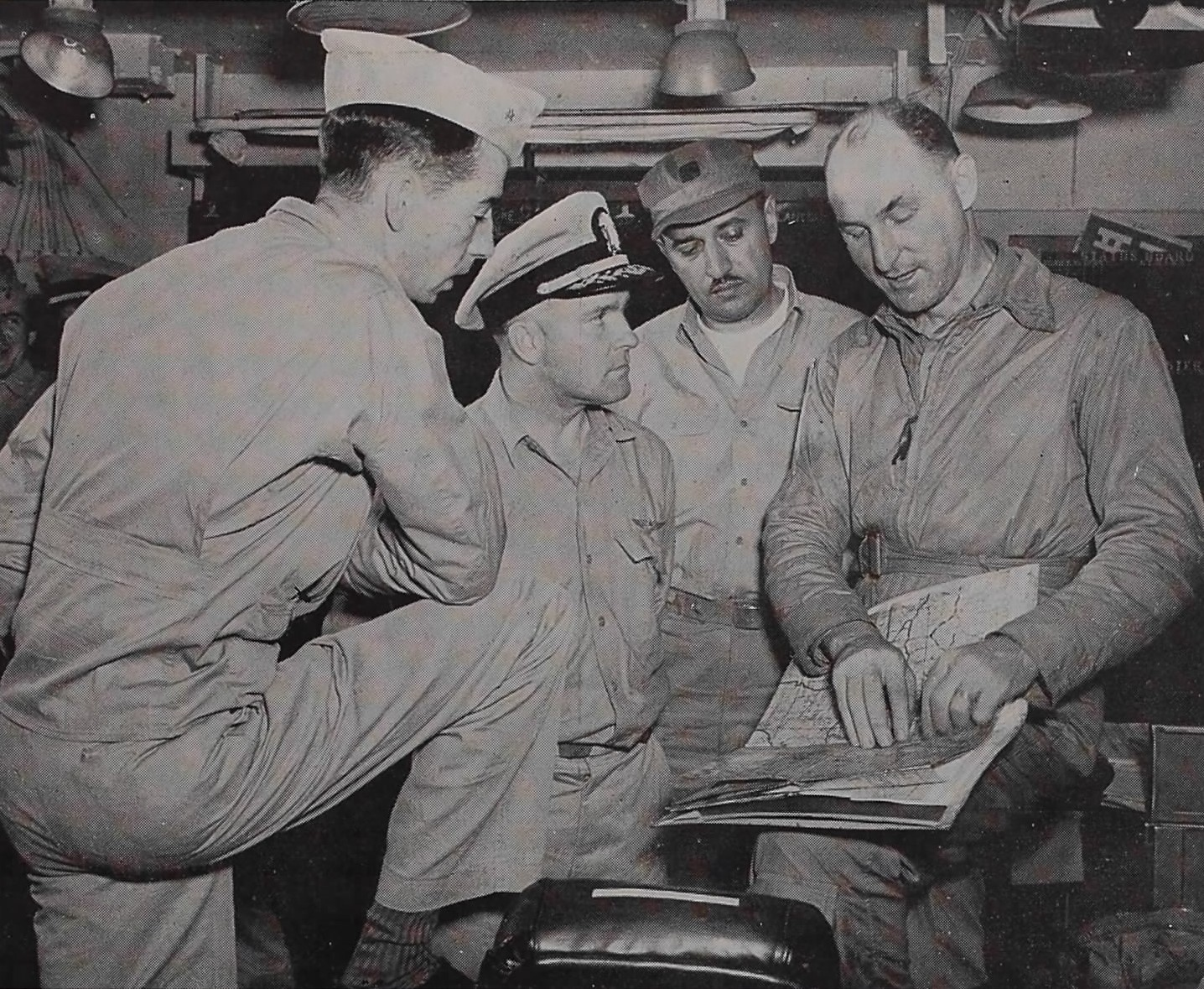
Captain Paul. D. Stroop being briefed aboard the USS Princeton. Caption on official picture says "briefing is a serious matter as pilot's safety and success of mission depends upon accuracy."

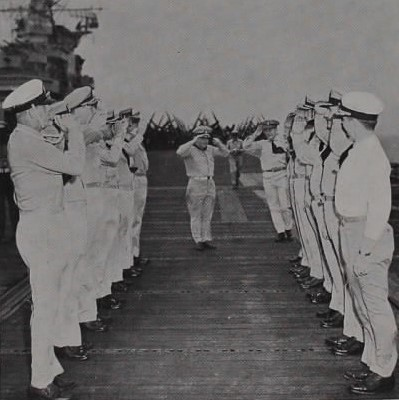
Captain Paul. D. Stroop given final salute by his crew on the USS Princeton before change of command

In 1951, Stroop became Commanding Officer of the carrier Princeton (CV-37) in the Sea of Japan during the Korean War. He was noted for his respected leadership. According his dedication in the ship's 1952 cruise book, his influence fostered high morale and operational success among the crew.

"The Commanding Officer has an immeasurable influence on the morale and spirit of a ship. That the Princeton is a happy ship, and an efficient ship, is proof of the profound admiration and respect which the men feel toward their skipper.

The pilot, launched on a mission, went in confidence that he was supported all the way by the deep concern of a leader who would spare no effort to insure his safe return. The head of each department knew that he could rely on the backing and wise decisions of the Captain. And the erring seaman who came before the mast was sure that he would be treated with patience and justice.

The Loyalty of all hands is a reflection of the qualities of manhood they see in their Commanding Officer."

— U.S. Naval Institute, US, Navy Cruise Books USS Princeton (CVA-37) 1952, Source at U.S. Navy Cruise Books Collection

Then, in 1952, he assumed command of the Essex (CV-9), and was promoted to rear admiral. In 1953, he left the Essex to become Commanding Officer of the Naval Ordnance Test Station, China Lake, California.

From 1953 to 1955, he was Senior Member of the Weapons Systems Evaluation Group, Joint Chiefs of Staff, Navy Department, Washington. From 1955 to 1957, he served as Deputy Chief at the Bureau of Ordnance (BuOrd).

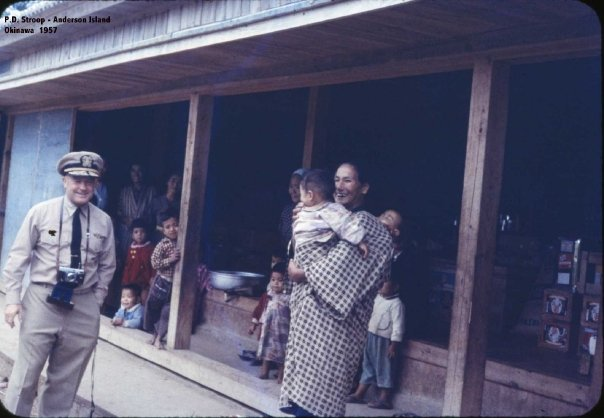
Rear Admiral Paul D. Stroop on Okinawa

From 1957 to 1958, he was Commanding Officer of the Taiwan Patrol Force based at Okinawa, Japan. From 1959 to 1962 he was Chief of the Bureau of Naval Weapons.

Stroop served from 1962 to 1965 as Commanding Officer of the Naval Air Force, Pacific Fleet (COMNAVAIRPAC), and as Commanding Officer, First Fleet, Air PAC, with the rank of vice admiral.

He retired in 1965. After his retirement to the San Diego area, he was a consultant to Ryan Aeronautical and Teledyne Ryan of San Diego until 1992.

Stroop died at the Coronado Hospital in Coronado, California, on 17 May 1995, aged 90.

== Personal life ==
Paul. D. Stroop met his wife Esther Holscher at the Naval Academy in his third year. Their first meeting was a Sunday afternoon after chapel in the yard, where a friend of his had brought her as a date. Stroop had a camera on him and took her picture. Not long after that, he managed to get a date with her and brought her to the academy. They began to see each other regularly and became his date for various hops and events.

Esther came from Baltimore, Maryland. They would visit each other using the electric railway, the WB&A, Washington, Baltimore, and Annapolis. Esther was extremely popular with the members of his class and he used to say she knew more members of his class than he did. She was very popular with cut-in dancing and it was difficult to get more than a few steps in with her at these hops.

Stroop and Esther waited until she completed her schooling to become a teacher and for Stroop to get through his first promotion to get married. This occurred five years later in 1926.

Stroop was married to Esther Holscher Stroop from 1926 until her death in 1982. He was survived by his second wife, Kay Roeder Stroop; his two sons, two daughters, three stepdaughters, a stepson, 13 grandchildren, and 11 great-grandchildren. Stroop is buried at Fort Rosecrans National Cemetery.
