= Spring Styles books (U.S. Navy) =

U.S. Navy books detailing historical ship design proposals

The "Spring Styles" books were a series of project books maintained by the United States Navy's Bureau of Construction and Repair (C&R). They contained plans of potential warship designs for the Navy leadership. Called "Spring Styles" by the Preliminary Design staff after the term for ladies' fashion catalogs, they fulfilled an important role in the design of various ship classes from aircraft carriers and battleships to much smaller vessels. the Bureau of Construction and Repair became the Bureau of Ships in 1940 and is known presently as Naval Sea Systems Command.

The plans in these books were used in many cases to illustrate potential ship designs for Navy leadership, usually the General Board, of the implications of certain design characteristics and were used to help make decisions regarding them. Sometimes the plans were prepared after approved characteristics had been published to accommodate requests for modifications, which were often sought to make that project smaller and more affordable.

Three of these books are currently held in the U.S. National Archives Book 1 includes plans drawn between 1911 and 1925. Book 3 covers 1938-1944; Book 4 covers 1946-1954. No surviving examples of Book 2 are known.

== Book 1 ==
The first "Spring Styles" book comprises 216 sheets of U.S. Navy "preliminary design" plans prepared by C&R between March 1911 and September 1925. The earliest of these plans were prepared by C&R's Scientific and Computing Branch, established in 1911, and by its successor organization, the Preliminary Design Division of the New Design Section, beginning in 1918. They were drawn in almost all cases by career civilian employees of C&R under the supervision of Navy Construction Corps naval architects and at the direction of the Navy's command leadership. Many drawings from World War I and immediately afterwards were prepared by naval architect James L. Bates, who began work at the New York Navy Yard in 1903 and joined C&R three years later. Bates served as director of the Technical Division of the Maritime Commission from 1938 to 1946.

Book 1 is in loose-leaf format. While many of the individual plans employ a standard format sheet 11.5 by 15 inches (290 by 380 mm), a variety of sizes is included. A number of them, in original ink drawings and blueprint copies, are notated in pencil, apparently from the time they were drawn. Not all the preliminary designs created during this time are included; there are gaps and missing plans. Unfortunately, many preliminary design workbooks for this period were considered no longer essential and consequently destroyed in the mid-1970s.

== Book 3 ==
Book 3 includes 75 individual sheets of "preliminary design" plans created between October 1939 and November 1944. Like Book 1, this album is loose-leaf with individual plans created in a variety of sizes. Many of these plans, drawn in ink and pencil on pale off-white drafting paper or linen, also contain informal pencilled notations. Most are drawn to a scale of 1/32 inch to one foot.

== See also ==
Maximum battleship

== Bibliography ==
=== Sources ===
- General index and description of "Spring Styles" Book 1 from the U.S. Naval History and Heritage Center at Shipscribe.com. Accessed 28 May 2018.
- General index and description of "Spring Styles" Book 1 from the U.S. Naval History and Heritage Center at Shipscribe.com. Accessed 28 May 2018.
