= Systems command =

Systems command may refer to:

- United States Navy systems commands, development agencies of the United States Navy.
- Space Systems Command, the future acquisition, research and development, and launch command of the United States Space Force.
- Air Force Systems Command, the former research and development command of the United States Air Force.

== See also ==
- A system command in a command-line interface
