= William J. Galinis =

Vice Admiral William J. Galinis
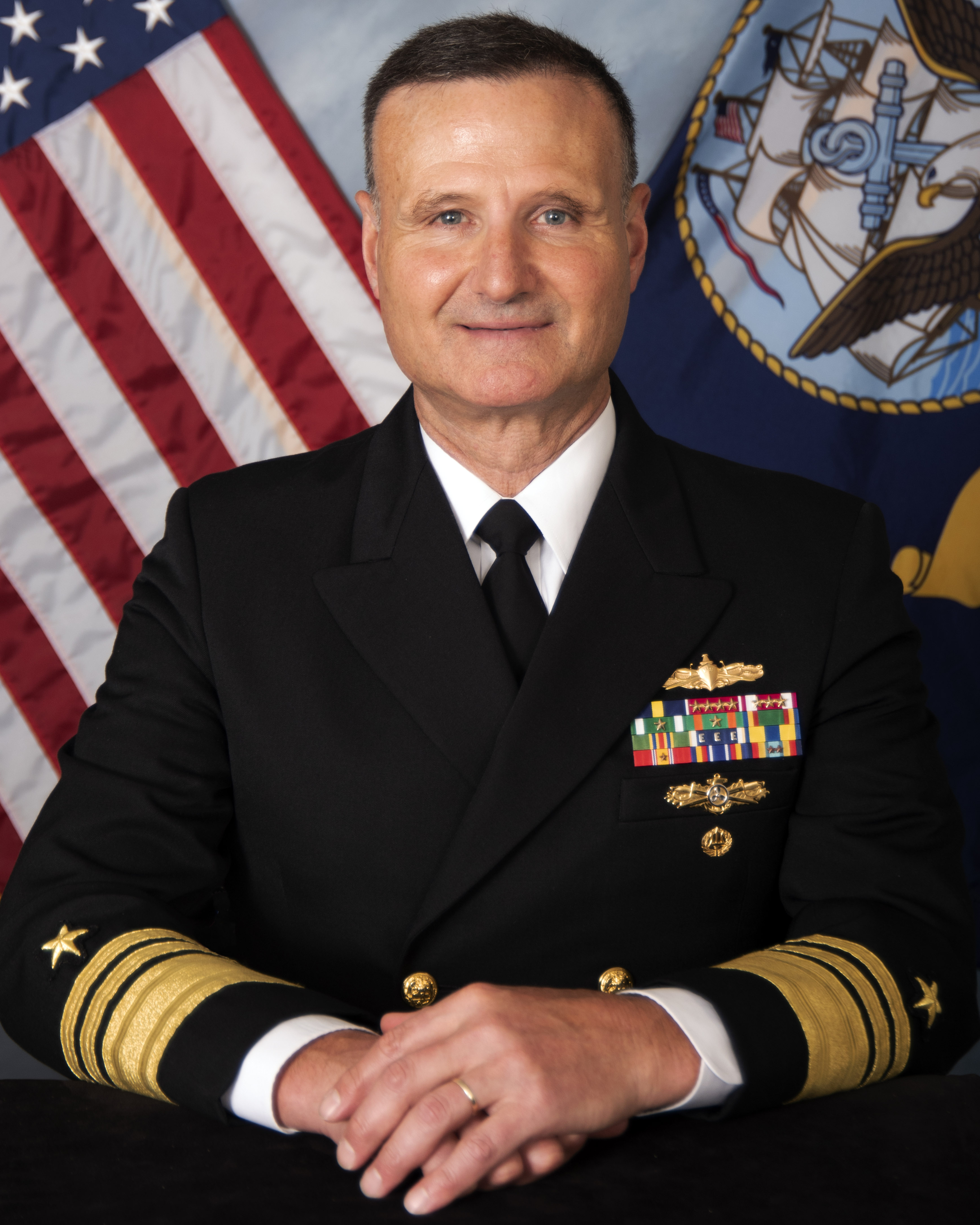
- Vice Admiral William J. Galinis, USN, c. 2020
- Born: c. 1961 (age 64–65)
- Education: United States Naval Academy (BS); Naval Postgraduate School (MS)
- Military career
- Allegiance: United States of America
- Branch: United States Navy
- Service years: 1983-2023
- Rank: Vice Admiral
- Commands: Naval Sea Systems Command; Navy Regional Maintenance Center; Norfolk Ship Support Activity (NSSA)

Vice Admiral William J. Galinis (born c. 1961) is a retired United States Navy officer and career Engineering Duty Officer who served as the 45th Commander of Naval Sea Systems Command from June 2020 to September 2023.

== Early life and education ==
Galinis is a native of Delray Beach, Florida. He is a 1983 graduate of the U.S. Naval Academy where he received a Bachelor of Science degree in Electrical Engineering. He holds a Master of Science degree in Electrical Engineering from the Naval Postgraduate School.

== Military career ==
Galinis’ sea duty assignments included Engineer Officer on board USS Roark (FF-1053) and Damage Control Assistant on board USS Vreeland (FF-1068).

His Engineering Duty Officer tours include supervisor of Shipbuilding, Conversion and Repair, New Orleans, where he worked on both new construction and repair projects including assignment as the PMS 377 Program Manager's representative for the (LSD) (CV) Shipbuilding Program; Board of Inspection and Survey, Surface Trials Board as Damage Control Inspector; and a number of program office and staff positions including the USS Zumwalt and USS San Antonio (LPD-17) Program Offices, Office of the Chief of Naval Operations in the Requirements and Assessments Directorate, and in the Office of the Deputy Assistant Secretary of the Navy for Shipbuilding as the Chief of Staff.

Galinis’ command assignments include LPD 17 Program Manager; Supervisor of Shipbuilding, Gulf Coast; and as the Commanding Officer of the Norfolk Ship Support Activity (NSSA).

Galinis’ flag assignments include Commander, Navy Regional Maintenance Center, during which time he also assumed the duties of Deputy Commander for Surface Warfare, Naval Sea Systems Command; and most recently as Program Executive Officer, Ships.

Vice Admiral Galinis assumed command as the 45th Commander of Naval Sea Systems Command (NAVSEA) in June 2020. He relinquished Command to Rear Adm. Tom Anderson and retired on September 1st, 2023.

== Military Awards ==
Galinis's awards include: https://commons.wikimedia.org/wiki/File:Navy_Distinguished_Service_Medal_ribbon.svg#/media/File:Navy_Distinguished_Service_Medal_ribbon.svg
