= Bureau of Naval Weapons =

Former bureau of the U.S. Navy (1959–1966)

The Bureau of Naval Weapons (BuWeps) was part of the United States Navy's material organization between 1959 and 1966, with responsibility for procurement and support of naval aircraft and aerial weapons, as well as shipboard and submarine naval weapons. The bureau was established August 18, 1959, by an act of Congress. The act merged the Bureau of Aeronautics (BuAer), which had responsibility for naval aircraft and related systems, and the Bureau of Ordnance (BuOrd), which had responsibility for naval weapons.

As aviation technology became increasingly complex after World War II, the Navy increasingly realized the need for better integration between its aircraft and aerial weapons. This was also to end the conflict between bureaus due to technological convergence; BuOrd's work in guided missiles, for example, was overlapping with BuAer's work on unmanned aircraft.

BuWeps was under the command of a two-star admiral known as the Chief, BuWeps. Four individuals served in this position:

- RADM Paul D. Stroop - September 10, 1959 – October 29, 1962
- RADM Kleber S. Masterson - November 27, 1962 – March 24, 1964
- Radm. Wellington T. Hines (acting), March 25, 1964 - May 27, 1964
- RADM Allen M. Shinn - May 28, 1964 – 1 May 1966

The establishment of BuWeps represented only a temporary solution to the Navy's needs. In the mid-1960s, the Navy completely revised its material organization, replacing the bureau system with "systems commands" (SYSCOMs). BuWeps was disestablished May 1, 1966 and replaced with the current Naval Air Systems Command (NAVAIR) and the Naval Ordnance Systems Command (NAVORD). RADM Shinn, Chief, BuWeps, became the first Commander, Naval Air Systems Command. NAVORD was merged with the Naval Ship Systems Command (NAVSHIPS) to form the Naval Sea Systems Command (NAVSEA) in 1974.

== See also ==
- Bureau of Ordnance
- Bureau of Aeronautics
- United States Navy bureau system
