= Thomas Moore (admiral) =

United States Naval Officer

Thomas J. Moore
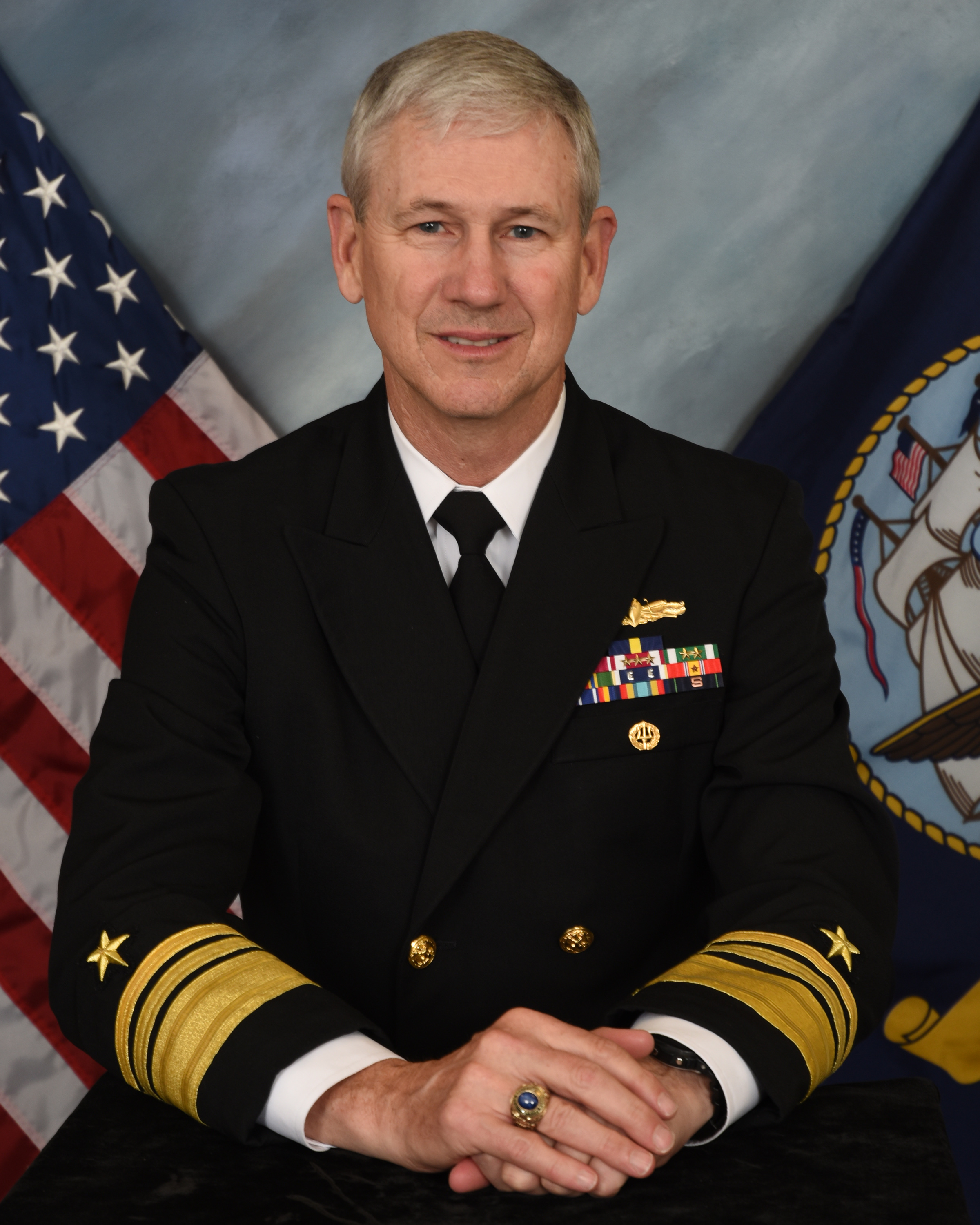
- Vice Admiral Moore in 2016
- Born: 1959 (age 66–67); New York City, New York, U.S.
- Alma mater: United States Naval Academy (BS); George Washington University (MS); Massachusetts Institute of Technology (MS)
- Military career
- Allegiance: United States
- Branch: United States Navy
- Service years: 1981–2020
- Rank: Vice admiral
- Commands: Naval Sea Systems Command
- Awards: Navy Distinguished Service Medal (2); Legion of Merit (3); Meritorious Service Medal (4)

Vice Admiral Thomas J. Moore (born 1959) is a former senior officer in the United States Navy. He retired from active duty on June 19, 2020, after 39 years of service. He currently serves as Vice President of Customer Relations for the Mission Technologies Division at Huntington Ingalls Industries.

== Early life and education ==
Moore graduated from the United States Naval Academy in 1981 with a Bachelor of Science in math and operations analysis. He also holds a degree in information systems management from George Washington University and a Master of Science and an engineer's degree in nuclear engineering from the Massachusetts Institute of Technology.

== Career ==
As a surface nuclear trained officer for 13 years, Moore served in various operational and engineering billets aboard USS South Carolina (CGN-37) as a machinery division officer, reactor training assistant and electrical officer; USS Virginia (CGN-38) as main propulsion assistant; USS Conyngham (DDG-17) as weapons officer; and USS Enterprise (CVN-65) as the number one plant station officer responsible for the de-fueling, refueling and testing of the ship's two lead reactor plants during her 1991–1994 refueling complex overhaul (RCOH). Additionally, ashore he served two years as a company officer at the United States Naval Academy.

In 1994, Moore was selected for lateral transfer to the engineering duty officer community where he served in various staff engineering, maintenance, technical and program management positions including, carrier overhaul project officer at the Supervisor of Shipbuilding, Newport News, Virginia, where he led the overhaul of the USS Enterprise (CVN-65), USS Theodore Roosevelt (CVN-71) and the first year of the USS Nimitz (CVN-68) RCOH; assistant program manager for In-Service Aircraft Carriers (PMS 312) in the office of the Program Executive Officer, Aircraft Carriers, Aircraft Carrier Hull, Mechanical and Electrical (HM&E) requirements officer on the staff of the chief of Naval Operations Air Warfare Division (OPNAV N78); and, five years in command as the major program manager for In-Service Aircraft Carriers (PMS 312), where he was responsible for the new construction of the USS George H.W. Bush (CVN-77), the RCOH of the USS Dwight D. Eisenhower (CVN-69) and the USS Carl Vinson (CVN-70) and the life cycle management of all In-Service Aircraft Carriers.

In April 2008, Moore reported to the chief of Naval Operations staff as the deputy director, Fleet Readiness, Office of the Chief of Naval Operations (OPNAV) N43B. From May 2010 to July 2011, he served as the director, Fleet Readiness, OPNAV N43.

Moore commanded the Program Executive Office for Aircraft Carriers from August 11, 2011, to June 1, 2016. Over this five-year period, he led the largest ship acquisition program in the U.S. Navy portfolio; was responsible for designing, building, testing and delivering Ford-class aircraft carriers; led the Navy's first-ever inactivation of a nuclear-powered aircraft carrier, USS Enterprise (CVN-65); and was the lead in the U.S.-India Joint Working Group Aircraft Carrier Technology Cooperation.

Moore became the 44th Naval Sea Systems Command (NAVSEA) commander on June 10, 2016. As NAVSEA commander, he oversaw a global workforce of more than 74,000 military and civilian personnel responsible for the development, delivery and maintenance of the Navy's ships, submarines and systems. Moore retired from military service in June 2020.

Moore's personal awards include the Navy Distinguished Service Medal (two awards), Legion of Merit (three awards), Meritorious Service Medal (four awards), and the Navy and Marine Corps Commendation Medal.

In January 2021, Moore was named Vice President of Nuclear Operations at Huntington Ingalls Industries, the United States' only manufacturer of nuclear-powered aircraft carriers. He is now the Vice President of Customer Affairs for the Mission Technology Division at HII.
