= Paul E. Sullivan =

American Navy admiral

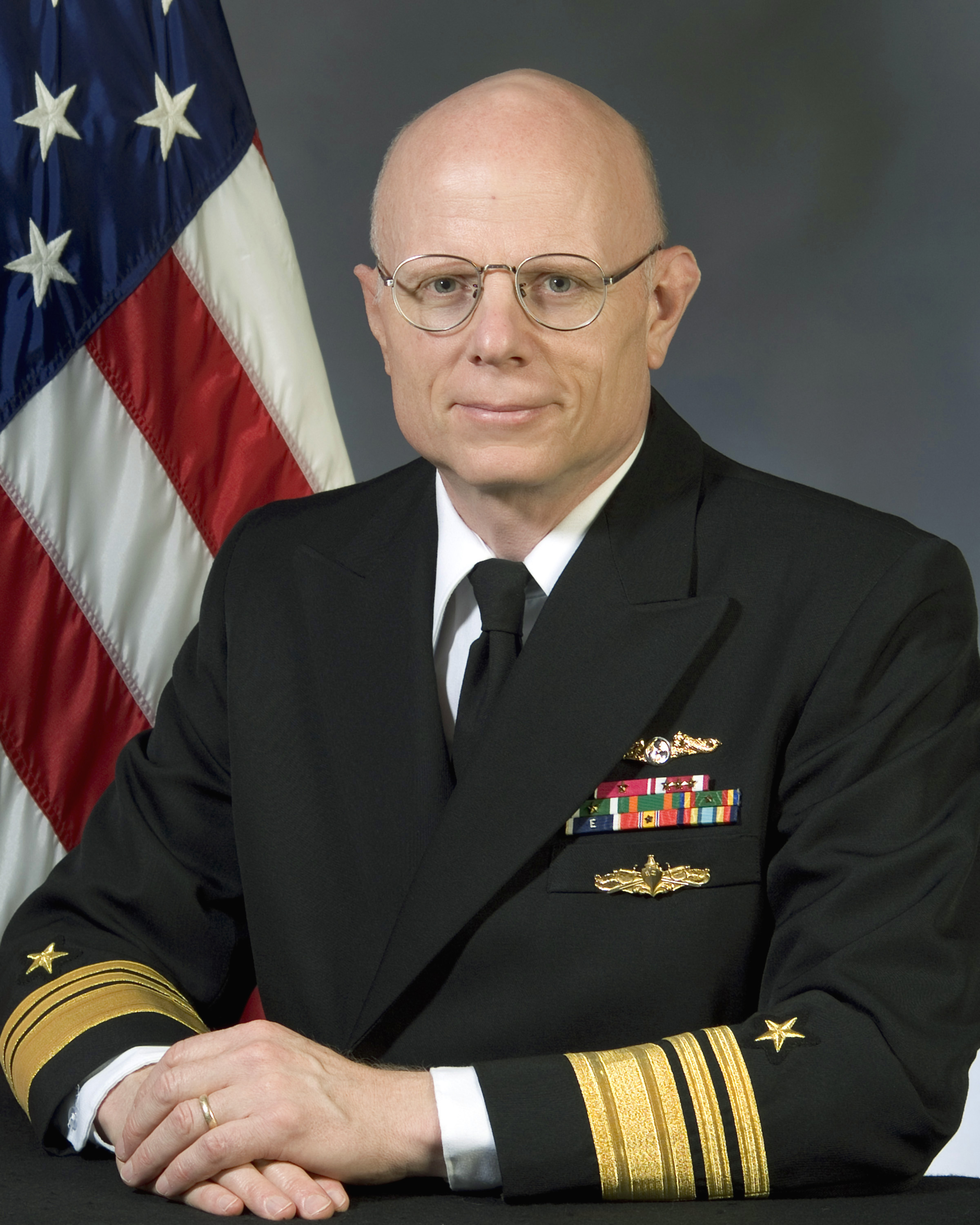
- Born: Paul Edward Sullivan; 1952 (age 73–74)
- Military career
- Allegiance: United States of America
- Branch: United States Navy
- Service years: 1974–2008
- Rank: Vice Admiral
- Commands: Naval Sea Systems Command
- Other work: VP USEC (2009-2014); Exec Dir PennState ARL(2014-present)

Paul E. Sullivan (born 1952) is a retired United States Navy vice admiral.

== Personal ==
Sullivan is native of Chatham, New Jersey. He graduated from the U.S. Naval Academy in 1974 with a Bachelor of Science degree in mathematics. He earned dual degrees of Master of Science in Naval Architecture and Marine Engineering and Ocean Engineer from Massachusetts Institute of Technology. He was an associate professor of Naval Architecture for MIT.

== Military career ==
Sullivan served on USS Detector where he earned his Surface Warfare Qualification. After transferring to the Engineering Duty Officer Community, he served at the Norfolk Naval Shipyard, Naval Sea Systems Command, Supervisor of Shipbuilding in Groton, Connecticut and on the staff of the Assistant Secretary of the Navy (Research, Development and Acquisition). During his engineering duty assignments Adm. Sullivan earned his Submarine Engineering Duty Officer Qualification.

Sullivan served as program manager of the Seawolf-class Submarine Program (PMS 350) and the Virginia-class Submarine Program (PMS 450) from 1995 to 1998.

Sullivan served as Deputy Commander for Ship Design Integration and Engineering, Naval Sea Systems Command from 2001 to 2005.

Vice Adm. Sullivan became the 41st Commander, Naval Sea Systems Command in July 2005 until his retirement from the Navy in August 2008.

== Post-military career ==
From 2009 to 2014, Sullivan served as a chief engineer and vice president with USEC.

In September 2014, Sullivan was named as the executive director of Penn State's Defense Related Research Units (DRRU) and Applied Research Laboratory (ARL).

As of 2024, Sullivan began teaching at his alma mater, the United States Naval Academy, in areas of project management and engineering economics. He has been quoted as saying "Getting to teach these midshipman has been the greatest accomplishment of my career."
