= Joint Expeditionary Forensics Facilities =

The Joint Expeditionary Forensics Facilities, or JEFF, program provides crime scene investigation (CSI) forensic science to the US military as a method to identify insurgents during counter-insurgency operations.

The first battlefield forensics lab was an enterprise spearheaded by the Naval Criminal Investigative Service to support the Marine Corps in Al Anbar Province, Iraq. The lab was set up near Fallujah, Iraq, in March 2006 during Operation Iraqi Freedom. The NCIS lab began with only a latent print (partial fingerprint or fingerprint not visible to the naked eye) capability as this was perceived to be expeditionary part of crime scene investigation.

In December 2006, the PMO/LEFL (Law Enforcement Forensics Lab) was established in Camp Victory, Baghdad, Iraq. The focus of the LEFL was to help reduce the high number of sniper attacks throughout the Iraq Theater of Operations (ITO). At the time, the lab had latent print and firearm/toolmark capabilities.

The first DNA lab was established in the International Zone, Baghdad, Iraq, in November 2006 to support an Extra-Judicial Killings Task Force. DNA analysts were relocated to this LEFL lab in August 2007. This co-location of disciplines represented the first fully capable forensics lab. In late 2007, the commanding general of the Multi-National Corps – Iraq directed the establishment of JEFF labs in each major Division area of operation. This resulted in three additional labs being stood up to support Coalition Force in Iraq. Due to the success of the JEFF concept many of the people involved in the JEFF program shifted to support Operation Enduring Freedom in Afghanistan.

The JEFF program is run through the Naval Surface Warfare Center in Dahlgren, Virginia, US. Prime vendor contract support is from BAE Systems. JEFF supports all of the Services.
