= Naval EOD Technology Division =

Field activity of the U.S. Navy

Coordinates: 38°35′47″N 77°10′13″W

The Naval Explosive Ordnance Disposal Technology Division (NAVEODTECHDIV) is a field activity of the United States Naval Sea Systems Command (NAVSEA). It is located 30 miles South of Washington, D.C. in Charles County, Maryland. NAVEODTECHDIV is a unique support activity administered by the U.S. Navy on the Indian Head Naval Surface Warfare Center and utilized by all the Armed Services who work together to determine Joint Explosive Ordnance Disposal (EOD) requirements.

== Historical background ==
The Naval Explosive Ordnance Disposal Technology Division traces its origin back to World War II when the U.S. Navy recognized the need for countering advanced and complex weapons systems being deployed by other nations. In May 1941, the Naval Mine Disposal School was established in Washington D.C. Later that year the Naval Bomb Disposal School was also established. In 1945, both schools combined to form the Naval Ordnance Disposal Unit and by 1946 relocated to the Naval Powder Factory in Indian Head, MD. An important component of those schools was the Ordnance Investigation Lab (OIL) located at the Stump Neck Annex, which was tasked to develop standardized procedures and tools for that core of EOD professionals. Through the post war period and many name changes, the OIL evolved to keep pace with the increasingly complex and rapidly proliferating ordnance threat.

== Joint service explosives training ==
By 1951, the Navy was assigned Joint-Service (Navy, Army, Air Force, Marine Corps) EOD responsibilities for explosive training as well as research and development. Two years later, the research and development tasks were assumed by a separate organization, The Naval Explosive Ordnance Disposal Technical Center, that was located at the Stump Neck Annex. The explosive training function was renamed the Naval Explosive Ordnance Disposal School and remained at the Naval Powder Factory. By the mid-1950s, the Naval Explosive Ordnance Disposal Technology Center's technical staff grew to include civilian engineers and support technicians. In 1962, the Center was placed under the direction of a Commanding Officer and again renamed the Naval Explosive Ordnance Disposal Facility (NAVEODFAC). In 1971, the NAVEODFAC was tasked to provide EOD research and development support to carry out the responsibility of meeting Joint-Service EOD technology requirements. In 1995 the command became the Naval Explosive Ordnance Disposal Technology Division (NAVEODTECHDIV) under the Naval Ordnance Center (NOC). Today the NAVEODTECHDIV reports directly to the Naval Sea Systems Command.

== Explosive Ordance Disposal (EOD) technology program ==
=== History of the program ===
In 1951, the DoD assigned the U.S. Navy with the responsibility for Joint Service EOD Research and Development (R&D). Initially accomplished at the Naval EOD School, in 1953 a separate organization, the Naval EOD Technical Center, was established to accomplish the R&D tasks. A Joint Service Directive governed the program, and individual Services were allowed to continue their own EOD R&D programs. Following Congressional interest in 1969 regarding the individual Service efforts, DoD directed that all EOD R&D be consolidated under SECNAV as a Single Manager, to eliminate duplication of effort. A Joint Program was developed by the Services that ensured all of their interests were addressed. DoD Directive 5160.62 was first issued in 1971, designating SECNAV as the Single Manager for EOD Technology and Training, a designation that continues today. The Naval EOD Technology Division (NAVEODTECHDIV) is the EOD Technology Center, which the Navy is directed to provide, manage, and maintain.

=== Requirements and processes ===
The DoD EOD Technology Program is requirements driven and requires customer participation from the identification of requirements, to the selection of technology projects to satisfy requirements, to the acceptance of the ultimate R&D outputs. The process for customer participation is formal, structured, and documented.

Documentation of the process begins with DoDDir 5160.62 that, in addition to designating SECNAV as Single Manager, directs the appointment by the Navy of an Executive Manager with broad authority to manage the program. It also establishes a Program Board, constituted of flag/general officers from the four Services, to assist the Executive Manager and represent their Services. In addition, the directive establishes a Joint Service Military Technical Acceptance Board (MTAB), which must approve all EOD tools, equipment, procedures, and publications developed by the Navy, prior to their use by the Joint Services. DoDDir 5160.62 (1989), which has recently been revised by the Joint Services and is in the OSD approval process, is implemented by SECNAVINST 5410.116B and by a Joint Service instruction (OPNAVINST 8027.1G, MCO 8027.1D, AR 75-14, AFR 136-8). In addition to the DoD directive and Service implementing instructions, the Program Board issues detailed program guidance by Policy Agreements (PAs). The Program Board meets three to four times each year, or as otherwise required. Each Service maintains a Detachment at the NAVEODnaveodtechdiv to provide Service participation in all of the processes. The OICs of the Detachments constitute the MTAB, and Detachment personnel form two sub-groups of the MTAB, responsible for recommendations to the MTAB relative to approval of tools/equipment and procedures. These personnel interact daily with NAVEODTECHDIV personnel in R&D and procedures development.

== Sources ==
- Naval Explosive Ordnance Disposal Technology Division (NAVEODTECHDIV)-- A U.S. Navy website (public domain)
