= Marine Corps Systems Command =

Acquisition command of the United States Marine Corps

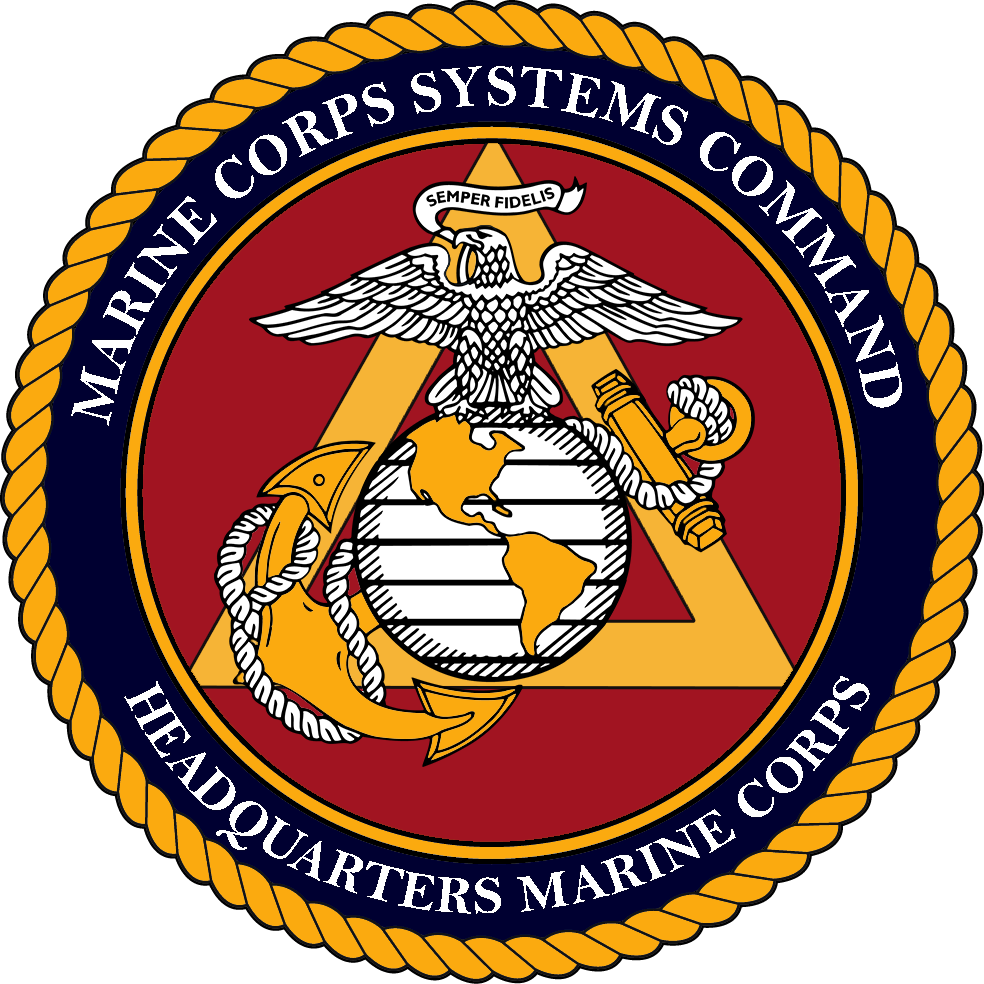
- MARCORSYSCOM insignia
- Country: United States of America
- Branch: United States Marine Corps
- Type: SYSCOM
- Role: Acquisition and sustainment of materiel and equipment
- Part of: Headquarters Marine Corps
- Garrison/HQ: Marine Corps Base Quantico, Virginia, U.S.
- Motto: "Equipping the warfighters to win." "Equipping our Marines." "Home of the Marine Corps Acquisition Professionals."

The Marine Corps Systems Command (MCSC) is the acquisition command of the United States Marine Corps, made up of Marines, sailors, civilians and contractors. As the only systems command in the Marine Corps, MCSC serves as Head of Contracting Authority and exercises technical authority for all Marine Corps ground weapon and information technology programs. MCSC is headquartered at Marine Corps Base Quantico.

== Mission ==
Marine Corps Systems Command serves as the Department of the Navy's systems command for Marine Corps ground weapon and information technology system programs in order to equip and sustain Marine forces with expeditionary and crisis-response capabilities.

== Organization and History ==
=== History ===
MCSC traces its beginning to the Marine Corps Research, Development and Acquisition Command (MCRDAC), which the Marine Corps established Nov. 18, 1987, as required by the Goldwater Nichols Act. General Alfred Gray, then-Commandant of the Marine Corps (CMC), established the MCRDAC to streamline the systems acquisition process, incorporate the operating forces in identifying deficiencies and establish clear lines of authority, responsibility and accountability.

In addition to improving the acquisition process, MCRDAC was organized to comply with Department of Defense (DOD) and Department of the Navy initiatives. MCRDAC took the majority of the following separate activities and integrated them into one: the Development Center at Quantico, Va., the current Headquarters Marine Corps (HQMC) staff of the Deputy Chief of Staff for Research, Development and Studies, and the Acquisition Division of the Deputy Chief of Staff of Installations and Logistics.

A little more than four years later, as directed by Marine Corps Order 5000, on Jan. 1, 1992, the Corps re-designated MCRDAC as MCSC. The new Command was established to streamline the acquisition and life cycle management processes to improve readiness of the Fleet Marine Force (FMF), increase responsiveness and support for the FMF, and reduce costs. MCSC became responsible for those processes and functions that involve system acquisition and life cycle management formerly assigned to HQMC, Marine Corps logistic bases and MCRDAC.

Throughout its history the Command has taken on more responsibilities. In 1990, the assault amphibious vehicle program transferred from the Naval Sea Systems Command (NAVSEA). In 1995, Automated Manpower and Logistics Support Systems migrated from HQMC, and mission requirements for Total Life Cycle Support emerged. In 2001, the Application Support Branch transferred from HQMC, and the Command implemented a new realignment. Two years later, MCSC moved into its remodeled facility at Hospital Point on Marine Corps Base Quantico. In 2007, the Marine Corps established Program Executive Officer (PEO) Land Systems, fully supported by MCSC. In fact, the Command currently supports multiple PEOs within DOD. In 2011, MCSC completed its transition to a competency-aligned organization, and in 2012 the Command changed its program management offices and evolved to its current structure. In November 2012, the Command celebrated its Silver Anniversary.

The Command reports to the CMC for in-service support, operating forces support and the execution of logistics sustainment. For research, development and acquisition matters, MCSC reports directly to the Assistant Secretary of the Navy (ASN) for Research, Development and Acquisition (RDA).

== Portfolio Managers and Programs ==
=== Ground Combat Element Systems (GCES) ===
Ground Combat Element Systems equips and sustains the Marine Corps with fully integrated infantry, reconnaissance, and artillery weapons systems and their supporting equipment to increase the lethality of the Ground Combat Element. In partnership with stakeholders, GCES executes the in-service support of fielded equipment to ensure readiness. The Program Managers for GCES are: Infantry Weapons, Fire Support Systems, and Long Range Fires.

=== Command Element Systems (CES) ===
Command Element Systems provides and sustains command, control, communications and intelligence capabilities to the MAGTF. The Program Managers for CES are: Intelligence Systems, Command & Control, and Communications Systems.

=== Logistics Combat Element Systems (LCES) ===
Logistics Combat Element Systems equips and sustains the Fleet Marine Forces with Engineering, Supply, Maintenance, Ammunition, and Tactical Wheeled Vehicle systems and solutions to enable lethality. The Program Management Offices for LCES are: Engineer Systems, Supply & Maintenance Systems, Ammunition, Light Tactical Vehicles, and Medium & Heavy Tactical Vehicles.

=== Supporting Establishment Systems (SES) ===
The Program Managers for SES are: Networks & Infrastructure, Customer Support & Strategic Sourcing, and Applications.

=== Light Armored Vehicles (PM LAV) ===
Program Manager Light Armored Vehicle supports and modernizes the Family of Light Armored Vehicles. PM LAV is composed of multi-functional acquisition associates who are responsible for the life-cycle management of both Marine Corps and Foreign Military Sales programs. PM LAV is a professional work force and executes all acquisition disciplines to include program management, logistics, engineering, procurement, contracting, financial management, quality assurance and test and evaluation. Efficiencies are continually pursued between the Marine Corps and Foreign Military Sales programs. The Product Manager (PdM) portfolios for PM LAV are: Business Management, Program Management, Systems Engineering, Contracting, and Logistics.

=== Training Systems (PM TRASYS) ===
Program Manager Training Systems (PM TRASYS) improves the effectiveness of the Marine Air-Ground Task Force and globally deployed maritime expeditionary forces by providing training support and developing and sustaining training systems and devices. They are the training systems acquisition arm for the Marine Corps. The various training products they provide include simulators, mock weapons, range targets and range instrumentation. PM TRASYS also provides training technology research and development, distributed learning capabilities, training observation capabilities, after-action review systems, training personnel and combat environment role players. The Product Manager (PdM) portfolios for PM TRASYS are: Aviation Training Systems, Collective Training Systems, Individual Training Systems, and Range Training Systems.

== Supporting Programs ==
=== International Programs (IP) ===
The International Programs office at Marine Corps Systems Command plans, coordinates, implements and executes all Marine Corps-related Security Cooperation acquisition and logistics matters. it provides military assistance to friendly foreign governments through the sale of defense articles and services, international agreements and cooperation, comparative testing programs, disclosure of classified information requests, technology transfer, and the development of procedures, instructions and technical data packages.

=== Marine Corps Tactical Systems Support Activity (MCTSSA) ===
MCTSSA provides test and evaluation, engineering, and deployed technical support for USMC and joint service command, control, computer, and communications (C4) systems throughout all acquisition life-cycle phases.

=== Office of Small Business Programs (OSBP) ===
The Marine Corps Systems Command Office of Small Business Programs includes veteran-owned, service-disabled, HUBZone, small disadvantaged, and women-owned small businesses.

=== Systems Engineering & Acquisition Logistics (SEAL) ===
Systems Engineering & Acquisition Logistics provides centralized guidance and program advocacy for portfolio and program engineering and logistics matters in order to enable successful portfolio planning and execution. Engineering and logistics are core acquisition disciplines that critically impact a program's success. The alignment of Systems Engineering & Acquisition Logistics under a single umbrella enables systems integration and facilitates modernization of systems in operations and sustainment across the MAGTF. Marine Corps Systems Command's SEAL staff supports design, technical processes, data packages, independent verification, and sustainment across each program's entire life cycle.

=== Technology Transition Office (TTO) ===
The TTO coordinates Marine Corps Systems Command modernization plans, enables prototype experimentation, and performs technology readiness assessments.

== See also ==
U.S. Armed Forces systems commands

- Army Materiel Command
- United States Navy systems commands
  - Naval Sea Systems Command
  - Naval Air Systems Command
  - Naval Information Warfare Systems Command
  - Naval Facilities Engineering Systems Command
  - Naval Supply Systems Command
- Air Force Materiel Command
- Space Systems Command
