= Maximum battleship =

Series of studies for WWI-era battleships in the US Navy

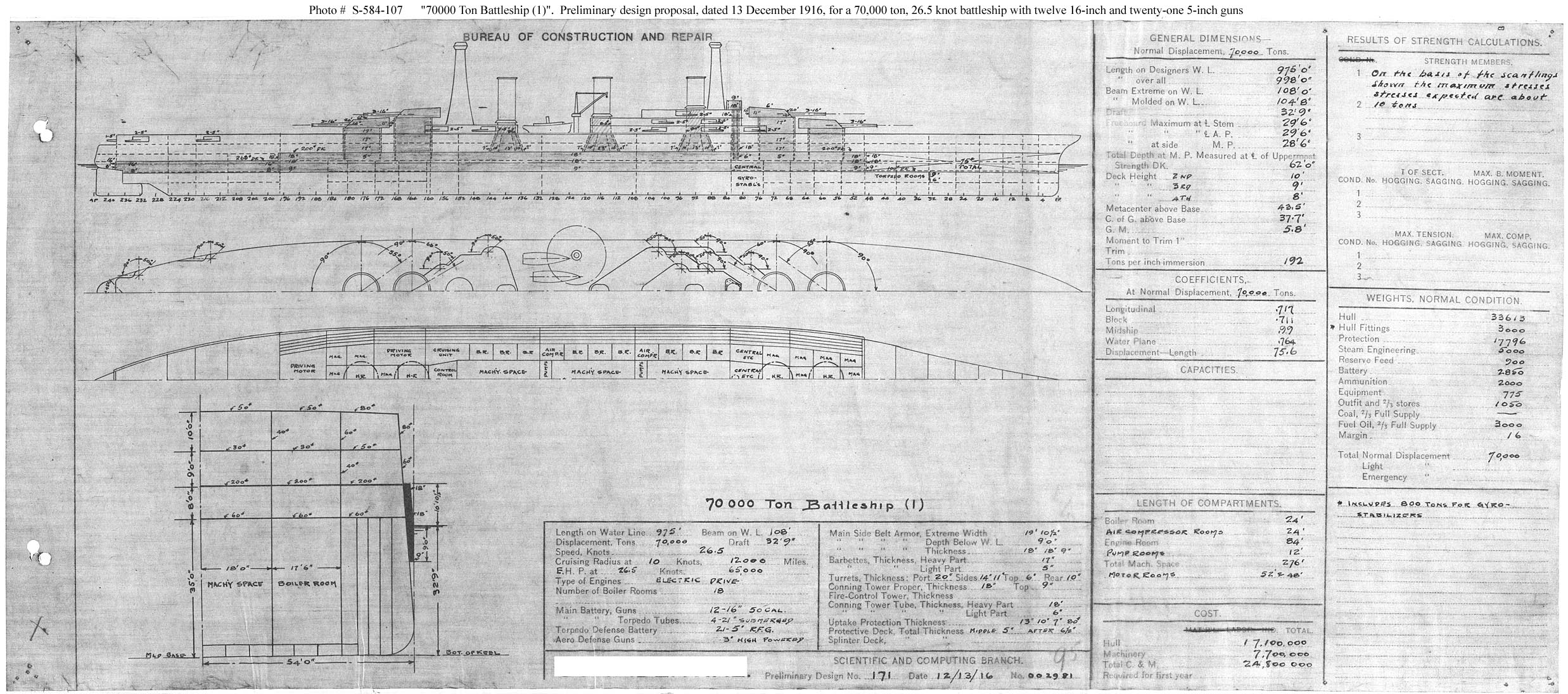
"Maximum Battleship" Design no.1

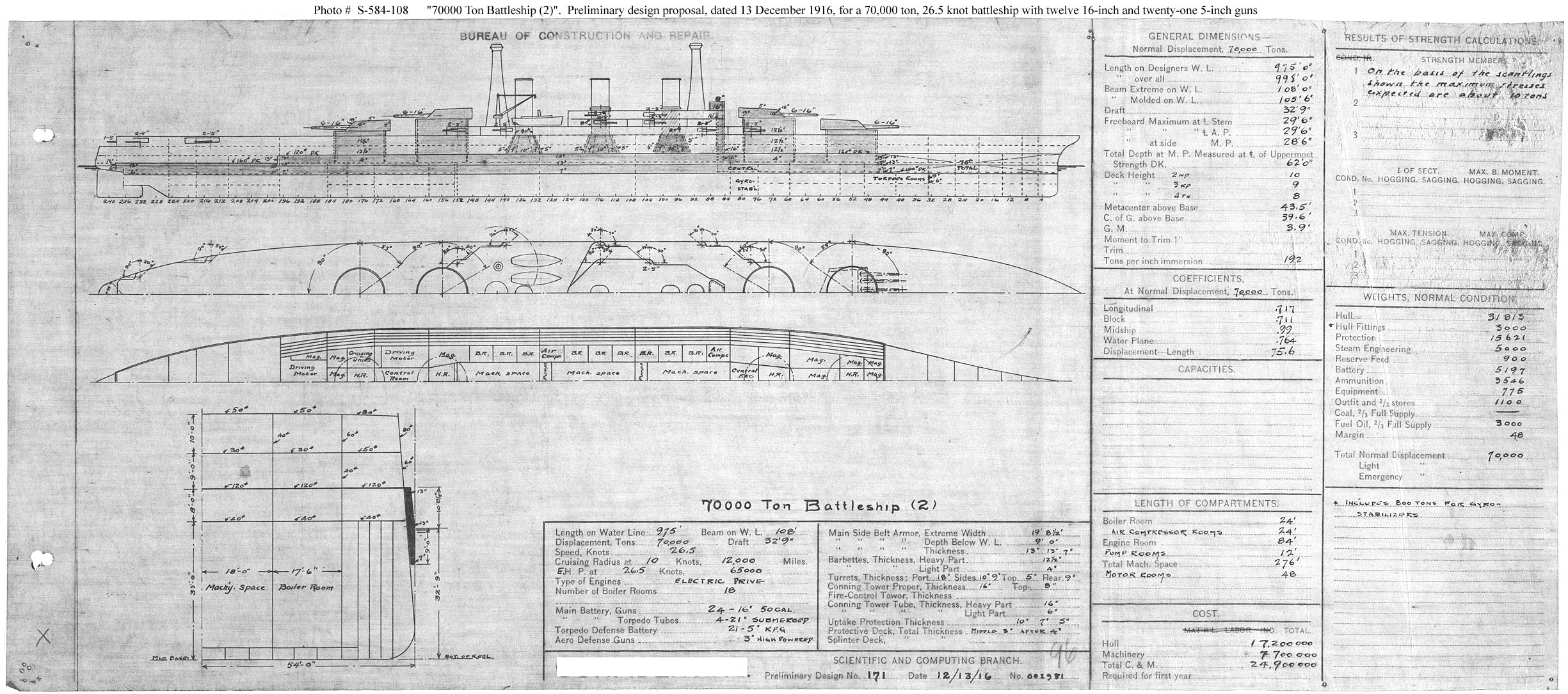
"Maximum Battleship" Design no.2

The "Maximum battleships," also known as the "Tillman battleships," were a series of World War I–era design studies for extremely large battleships, prepared in late 1916 and early 1917 upon the order of Senator "Pitchfork" Benjamin Tillman by the Bureau of Construction and Repair (C&R) of the United States Navy. They helped influence design work on the Pennsylvania and first South Dakota classes of battleships. The plans prepared for the senator were preserved by C&R in the first of its "Spring Styles" books, where it kept various warship designs conceptualized between 1911 and 1925. “Maximum battleships” referred to the largest-possible battleships the U.S. Navy could afford to construct and field while still being able to utilize the Panama Canal.

== Context ==
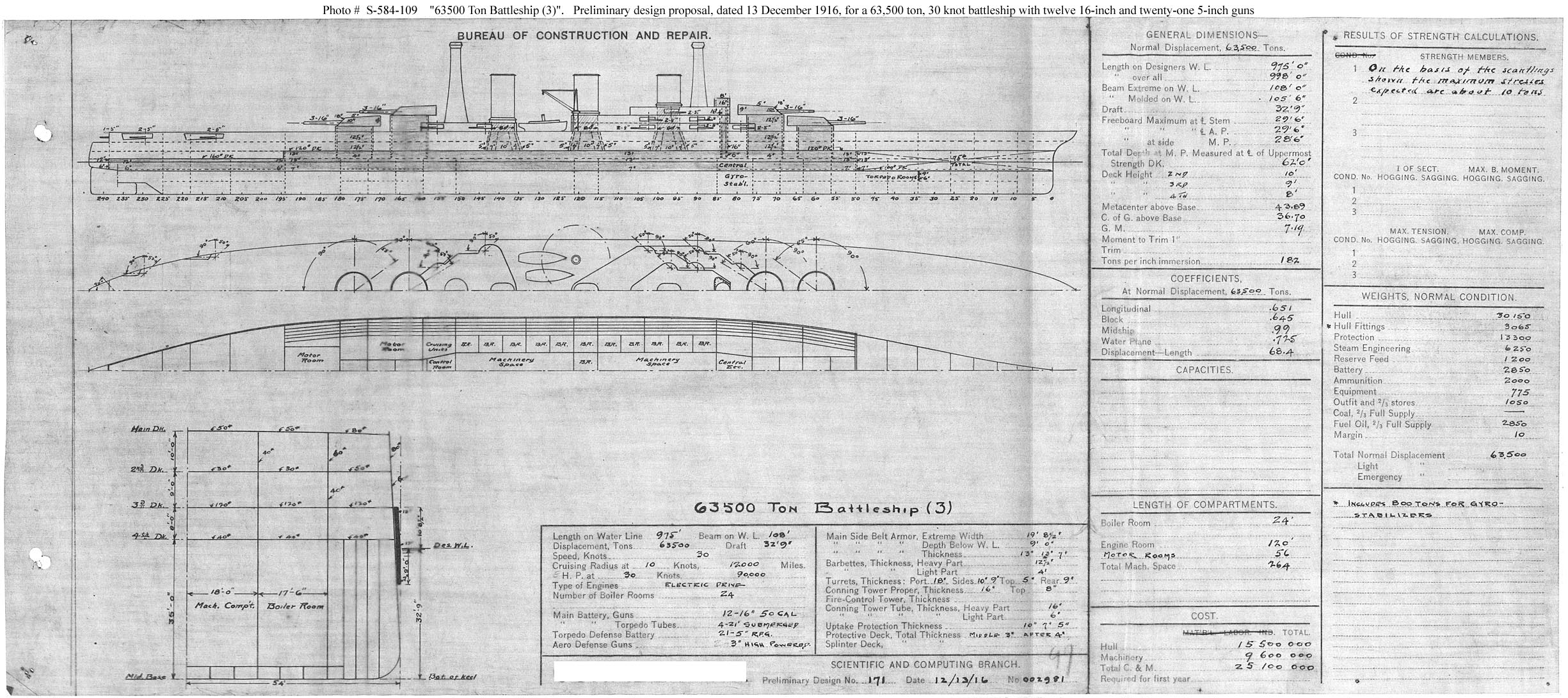
"Maximum Battleship" Design no.3

During the years leading up to World War I, some members of the U.S. Congress were growing frustrated with what they perceived to be chronic overspending by the U.S. Navy on battleships.

The only limits on the potential size of an American battleship were the dimensions of the locks of the Panama Canal. The locks measure roughly 1,000 by 110 feet (305 m × 34 m), and so the "maximum battleships" were 975 by 108 feet (297 m × 33 m). The Panamax draft limit during the designing of these battleships was 39 feet 6 inches (12.04 m), however the Department of the Navy required that all designs be limited to only 34 feet (10 m) in draft.

== Designs ==
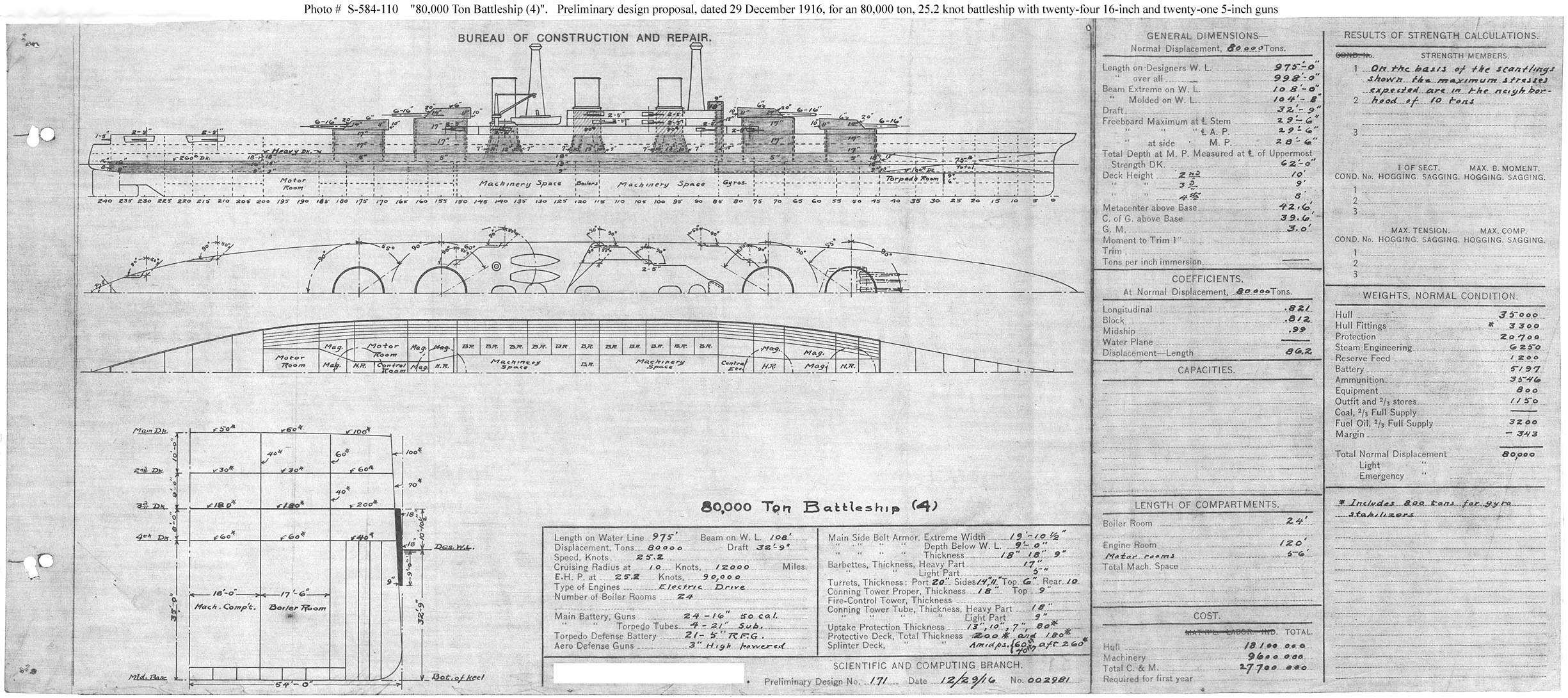
"Maximum Battleship" Design no.4

Tillman's first request for designs of so-called "maximum battleship" in 1912–1913 led to several estimates for battleships unconstrained by cost. Created by the US Navy Bureau of Construction and Repair (C&R), these ships would displace up to 38,000 long tons (39,000 t) and carry 14 inch guns. Although C&R was "appalled," in the words of naval historian Norman Friedman, by the extravagance of these designs, they admitted that far larger warships could transit the Panama Canal's locks, which, due to the US's geography, were often held to be the final limiting factor on the size of a US warship. Such larger designs would be often and seriously proposed within only a few years.

In 1916, Tillman repeated his request, and C&R produced another series of design studies. C&R drew up four blueprints, all ships having varying characteristics despite being built on the same hull:

- Tillman I – Armed with twelve 16-inch guns in four superfiring triple turrets (two at the bow, two at the stern), with an 18-inch thick armor belt and a speed of 26.5 knots.
- Tillman II – Armed with twenty-four 16-inch guns in four superfiring turrets in the same layout as "Tillman I," but with six guns in each turret. The speed remained at 26.5 knots, but the twelve additional 16-inch guns necessitated the thinning of the belt armor (to 13-inches) in order to meet the 70,000-ton displacement.
- Tillman III – A return to the armament of "Tillman I," with the reduced armor of "Tillman II" for an increased speed of 30 knots on a reduced displacement of 63,500-tons.
- Tillman IV – Using the sextuple turrets and layout of "Tillman II," "Tillman IV" retained the 18-inch belt of "Tillman I" in exchange for reducing speed to 25.2 knots and an increase in displacement to 80,000-tons.
- Tillman IV-1 – One of the two sub-designs that came out of refinement of "Tillman IV." Armed instead with thirteen 18-inch guns in five twin and one triple turret. It dropped the 18-inch belt to a 16-inch belt and displaced 80,000-tons.
- Tillman IV-2 – The second of the two sub-designs that came out of refinement of "Tillman IV." Armed instead with fifteen 18-inch guns in five triple turrets. It kept the 16-inch belt of IV-1. It also kept the same displacement as "Tillman IV."

== Comparisons to other US Navy battleships ==
The Tillman designs all included five casemate guns mounted aft, two on each side and one at the tip of the stern. Similar "stern chasers" had been previously mounted in Nevada, but were omitted from the Pennsylvania class. These casemates were a return to an older design idea; American battleship designers had abandoned hull-mounted casemates after the New Mexico class. They had transpired to be too "wet" – heavy seas rendered them unusable – and they had been removed from all earlier classes.

	Tillman I	Tillman II	Tillman III	Tillman IV	Tillman IV-1	Tillman IV-2	South Dakota class	Iowa class	Montana class
Design	13 Dec 1916	13 Dec 1916	13 Dec 1916	29 Dec 1916	30 Jan 1917	30 Jan 1917	8 Jul 1918	9 Jun 1938	6 Feb 1940
Displace- ment	70,000 short tons (63,500 t)	70,000 short tons (63,500 t)	63,500 short tons (57,600 t)	80,000 short tons (72,600 t)	80,000 short tons (72,600 t)	80,000 short tons (72,600 t)	43,200 short tons (39,200 t)	45,000 short tons (40,800 t)	70,000 short tons (63,500 t)
Length	975 feet (297 m)						660 feet (200 m)	860 feet (260 m)	921 feet (281 m)
Beam	108 feet (33 m)						106 feet (32 m)	108 feet (33 m)	121 feet (37 m)
Draft	32 feet 9 inches (10 m)						32 feet 9 inches (10 m)	36 feet (11 m)	36 feet (11 m)
Speed	26.5 knots (49.1 km/h; 30.5 mph)	26.5 knots (49.1 km/h; 30.5 mph)	30 knots (56 km/h; 35 mph)	25.2 knots (46.7 km/h; 29.0 mph)	25.2 knots (46.7 km/h; 29.0 mph)	25.2 knots (46.7 km/h; 29.0 mph)	23.5 knots (43.5 km/h; 27.0 mph)	33 knots (61 km/h; 38 mph)	28 knots (52 km/h; 32 mph)
Main battery	(12) 16-inch (406 mm), 50-caliber guns in four triple turrets	(24) 16-inch (406 mm), 50-caliber guns in four six-gun turrets	(12) 16-inch (406 mm), 50-caliber guns in four triple turrets	(24) 16-inch (406 mm), 50-caliber guns in four six-gun turrets	(13) 18-inch (457 mm), 50-caliber guns in five twin and one triple turret	(15) 18-inch (457 mm), 50-caliber guns in five triple turrets	(12) 16-inch (406 mm), 50-caliber guns in four triple turrets	(9) 16-inch (406 mm), 50-caliber guns in three triple turrets	(12) 16-inch (406 mm), 50-caliber guns in four triple turrets
Belt armor	9–18-inch (229–457 mm)	7–13-inch (178–330 mm)	7–13-inch (178–330 mm)	9–18-inch (229–457 mm)	8–16-inch (203–406 mm)	8–16-inch (203–406 mm)	8–13.5-inch (203–343 mm)	4–12.1-inch (102–307 mm)	10.2–16.1-inch (259–409 mm)
Barbette armor	5–17-inch (127–432 mm)	4–12.5-inch (102–318 mm)}	4–12.5-inch (102–318 mm)	5–17-inch (127–432 mm)	5–15-inch (127–381 mm)	5–15-inch (127–381 mm)	4.5–13.5-inch (114–343 mm)	11.6–17.3-inch (295–439 mm)	18–21.3-inch (457–541 mm)
Conning Tower armor	6–18-inch (152–457 mm)	6–16-inch (152–406 mm)	6–16-inch (152–406 mm)	9–18-inch (229–457 mm)	6–18-inch (152–457 mm)	6–18-inch (152–457 mm)	16-inch (406 mm)	17.3-inch (439 mm)	18-inch (457 mm)

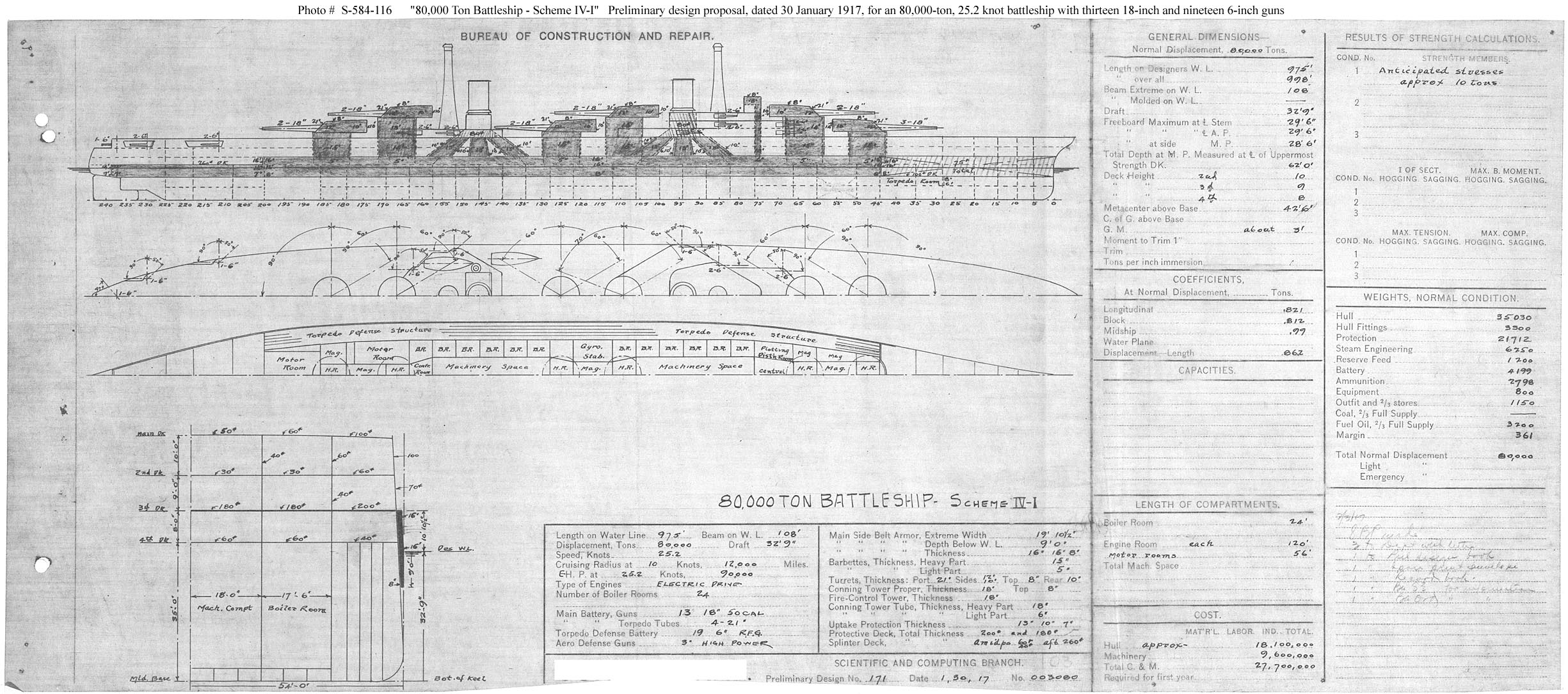
"Maximum Battleship" Design IV-1

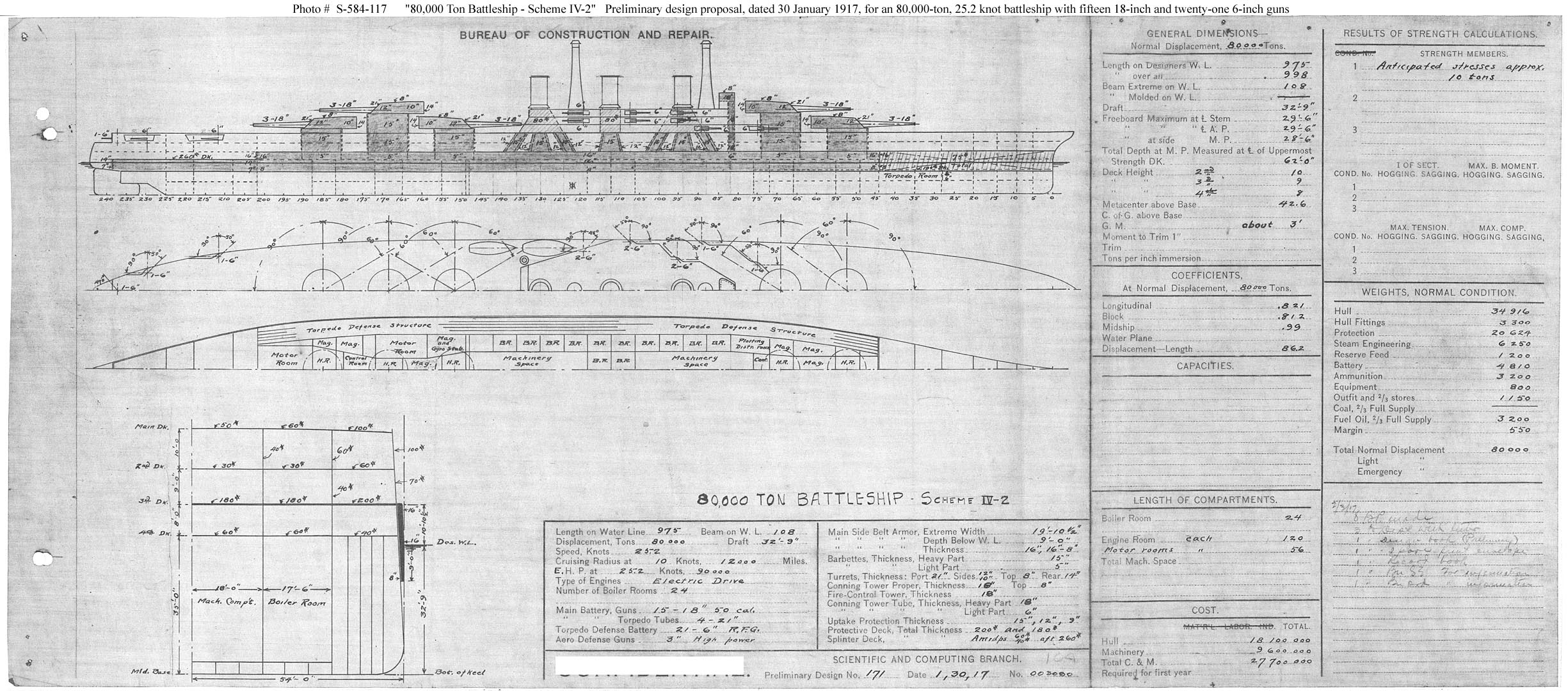
"Maximum Battleship" Design IV-2

== Fate of the designed battleships ==
The Washington Naval Treaty of 1922 limited naval armaments, causing the cancellation of the South Dakotas and halting all consideration of the "maximum battleships".

== See also ==
- HMS Incomparable

== Bibliography ==
- Friedman, Norman (1978). Battleship Design and Development, 1905–1945. New York: Mayflower Books. ISBN 0-8317-0700-3. OCLC 4505348.
