= Naval Surface Warfare Center =

Warfare Center of the U.S. Navy

Coordinates: 38.58454°N 77.18462°W

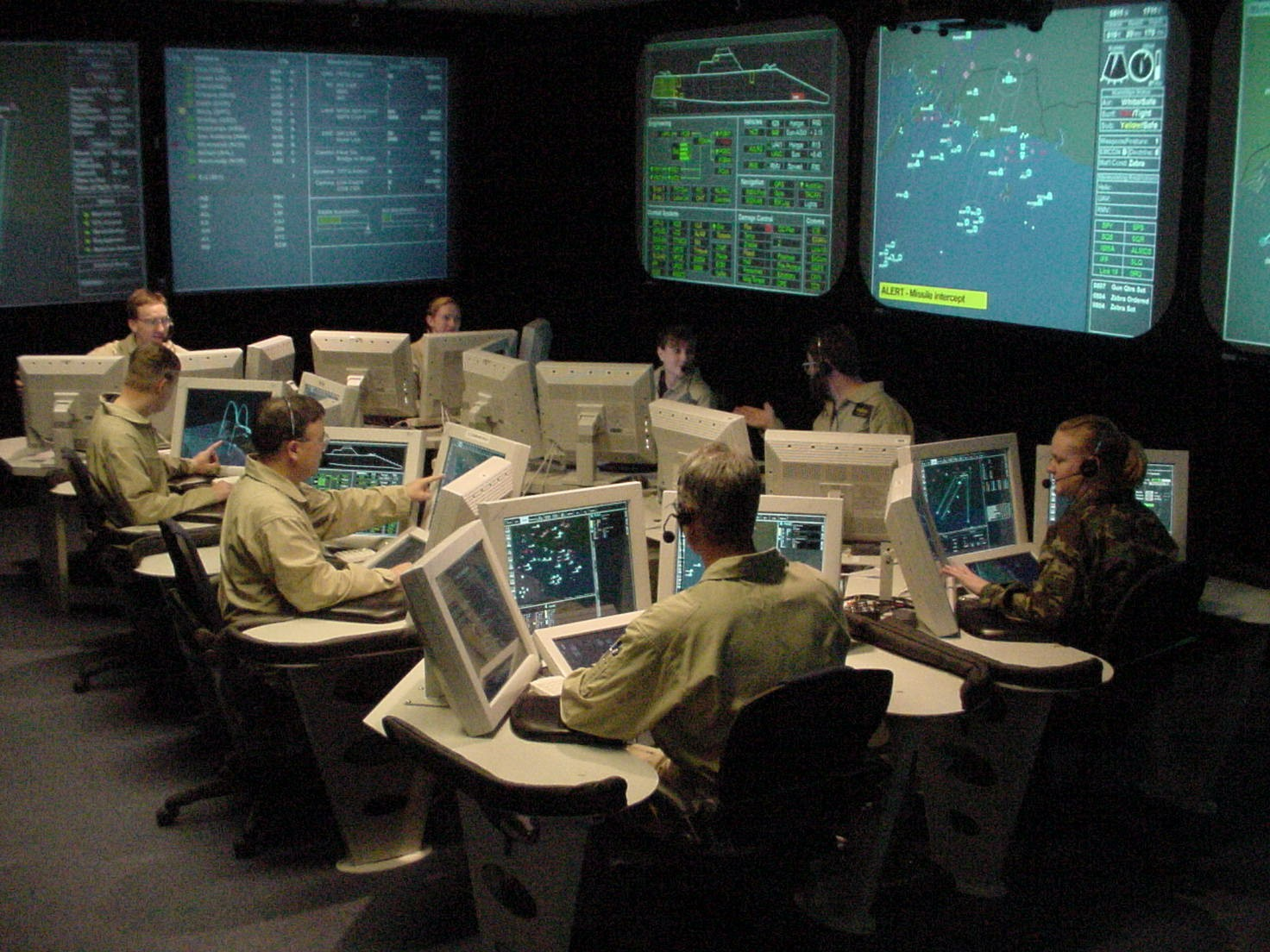
NSWC Dahlgren, Va. – Naval reservists, scientists and engineers work in the Integrated Command Environment (ICE) Human Performance laboratory located at NSWC Dahlgren, Va. The ICE lab focuses on the Navy's evolving human performance and human systems integration (HSI) testing

The Naval Surface Warfare Center (NSWC) is part of the Naval Sea Systems Command (NAVSEA) operated by the United States Navy. NAVSEA Warfare Centers supply the technical operations, people, technology, engineering services and products needed to equip and support the Fleet and meet the warfighter's needs. The Warfare Centers are the Navy's principal Research, Development, Test and Evaluation (RDT&E) assessment activity for surface ship and submarine systems and subsystems. Additionally, the Warfare Centers provide depot maintenance and In-Service Engineering support to ensure that the systems fielded today perform consistently and reliably in the future.

NSWC Crane "is the world's third-largest naval installation by geographic area and includes all of the roughly 320-hectare Greenwood Lake."

== Locations ==
NAVSEA currently operates eight Surface Warfare Centers:

- NSWC Carderock, Maryland
- NSWC Corona, California
- NSWC Crane, Indiana
- NSWC Dahlgren, Virginia
- NSWC Indian Head, Maryland
- NSWC Panama City, Florida
- NSWC Philadelphia, Pennsylvania
- NSWC Port Hueneme, California

NAVSEA also operates two Undersea Warfare Centers:

- NUWC Washington
- NUWC Newport, Rhode Island

== See also ==
- Joint Expeditionary Forensics Facilities, which are run from the Dahlgren Division.
- Naval Air Warfare Center
- Naval Information Warfare Center Pacific
