= Bureau of Supplies and Accounts =

Former bureau of the U.S. Navy (1892-1966)

The Bureau of Supplies and Accounts (BuSandA) was the United States Navy's supply organization between 1892 and 1966. Established in 1842 as the Bureau of Provisions and Clothing, the bureau was responsible for the procurement, receipt, storage, shipment, and issuance of food, fuel, clothing, general stores, and other materials. BuSandA also maintained and operated naval supply depots and similar units, and supervised activities of the Navy's Supply Corps officers. Duties also included the procurement, allocation, and disbursement of funds, and the holding of money and property accounts.

BuSandA was disestablished in 1966, as part of the Navy's general restructuring of its procurement system, and replaced with the Naval Supply Systems Command (NAVSUP).

== History ==
The bureau was established by Act of Congress on August 31, 1842 (5 Stat. 579) as the Bureau of Provisions and Clothing, one of the Navy Department's five original procurement bureaus replacing the Board of Navy Commissioners. The bureau was renamed the Bureau of Supplies and Accounts by the Navy Appropriation Act, July 19, 1892 (27 Stat. 243). This name carried BuSandA through World Wars I and II, and the Korean War.

During the 1960s, as part of Secretary of Defense Robert S. McNamara's emphasis on "systems engineering," the Navy essentially abolished the traditional "bureau system" of procurement and replaced it with a structure known as "systems commands." Effective May 1, 1966, BuSandA was replaced by NAVSUP, by Department of Defense reorganization order, March 9, 1966.

== See also ==
- United States Navy bureau system
