= Earl B. Fowler Jr. =

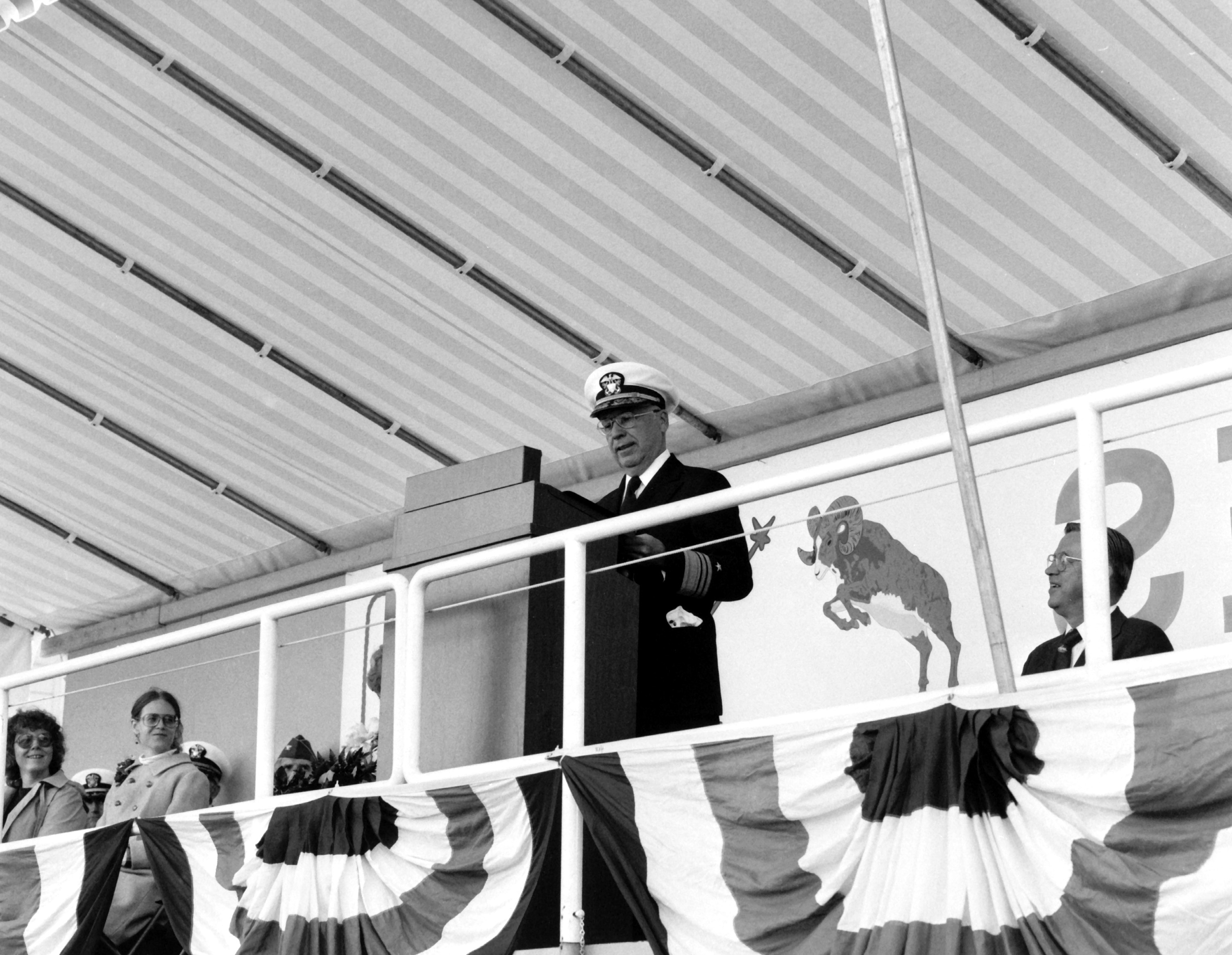
- Earl B. Fowler Jr.
- Born: Earl B. Fowler Jr. September 29, 1925; Jacksonville, Florida
- Died: February 8, 2008 (aged 82) at sea on the Seven Seas Mariner between Buenos Aires and Rio de Janeiro
- Spouse: Helen J. Fowler
- Military career
- Allegiance: United States of America
- Branch: United States Navy
- Service years: 1943–1982
- Rank: Vice Admiral
- Commands: Naval Sea Systems Command
- Awards: Navy Distinguished Service Medal; Legion of Merit

Earl Bealle Fowler Jr. (September 29, 1925 – February 8, 2008) was a Vice Admiral in the United States Navy.

Secretary of the Navy John Lehman described Fowler in 1988 as one of the "blue suiter superstars" in his book Command of the Seas: Building the 600 Ship Navy.

== Education ==
Fowler earned a bachelor's degree in mechanical engineering from Georgia Tech in February 1946 and a master's degree in electrical engineering from Massachusetts Institute of Technology in 1949.

Fowler attended the six-week Advanced Management Program at Harvard Business School in 1970.

== Career ==
Fowler joined in the United States Navy on May 18, 1943, joining the V-12 Navy College Training Program. He served on the USS Leary, aircraft carriers USS Wright and USS Ranger. From 1976 to 1980, he was commander of the Naval Electronics Systems Command and from March 1980 to his retirement in June 1985, he was commander of Naval Sea Systems Command.

== Awards ==
- Navy Distinguished Service Medal
- Legion of Merit
