= Naval Supply Systems Command =

One of the five "systems commands" of the United States Navy

Coordinates: 40°13′46″N 76°59′4″W

Naval Supply Systems Command (NAVSUP)
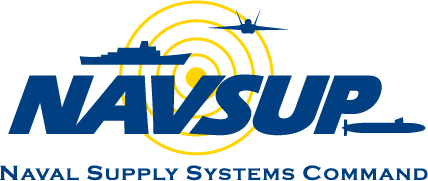
- Allegiance: United States of America
- Branch: United States Navy
- Type: SYSCOM
- Garrison/HQ: Mechanicsburg, Pennsylvania, U.S.

Commanders
- Chief of Supply Corps: Rear Admiral Kristin Acquavella, SC, USN
- Deputy Commander: Vacant
- Vice Commander: Karen Fenstermacher, SES
- Chief of Staff: CAPT Joseph R. Bossi, SC, USN
- Command Master Chief: Command Master Chief Petty Officer Ryan M. Colosimo, USN

The Naval Supply Systems Command (NAVSUP) is a military unit of the United States Navy that serves supply command for providing supplies and services to both the Navy and the United States Marine Corps. Located in Mechanicsburg, Pennsylvania, the NAVSUP team oversees supply chain management and security assistance. It replaced the Bureau of Supplies and Accounts (BuSandA), the previous Navy supply organization, in 1966.

The Naval Supply Systems Command was formed in 1962 under the name of the Naval Fleet Material Support Office (FMSO), later being renamed to Navy Supply Information Systems Activity (NAVSISA) and ultimately becoming Naval Supply Systems Command (NAVSUP) in 1966.

As of June 2023, Rear Admiral Kenneth W. Epps assumed the role of Commander for NAVSUP.

== NAVSUP Headquarters ==
Naval Supply Systems Command (NAVSUP) Headquarters acts as the authority for command administration and operations in regards to global naval logistics, supply chain management, contracting, financial management, information technology, and enterprise support. Being an Echelon II command of the United States Navy, NAVSUP develops policies and manages resources in order to support sustainment of naval operations throughout the world.

NAVSUP Headquarters consists of several directorates and offices responsible for particular functions.

=== Financial Management and Comptroller (SUP 01) ===
Financial Management and Comptroller (SUP 01) directorate provides financial planning, programming, budgeting, accounting, resource management, execution and control in the framework of NAVSUP enterprise. This directorate acts as the principal authority on financial management of the command.

=== Contracting (SUP 02) ===
Contracting (SUP 02) directorate acts as the strategic leader of NAVSUP contracting community and provides support for the Navy Field Contracting System. On behalf of the Head of the Contracting Activity, the directorate develops contracting policy, performs its operational oversight and manages contracting and purchasing authorities delegated to NAVSUP. The directorate also provides contracting support for those Department of the Navy organizations which do not have delegated contracting authority.

=== Corporate Operations (SUP 03) ===
Corporate Operations (SUP 03) directorate manages such enterprise support functions as human resources, talent management, administration, travel, knowledge and records management, innovation, research and development, process improvement, security, safety, and facilities management. In addition, this directorate acts as the Executive Agent of the Department of the Navy's Consolidated Card Programs.

=== Supply Chain Management Policy and Performance (SUP 04) ===
Supply Chain Management Policy and Performance (SUP 04) directorate develops logistics policy and provides oversight of the NAVSUP enterprise's global supply chain operations. The directorate ensures that Navy supply systems will provide responsive logistics support to fleet and shore commands during both peacetime and contingency operations. SUP 04 also manages enterprise information technology, supply chain information systems, business applications, and systems integration. The organization is responsible for information technology governance, certification, budgeting, and development of enterprise logistics information systems.

=== NAVSUP Ammunition Logistics Center (NALC) ===
NAVSUP Ammunition Logistics Center (NALC) develops policies and procedures for the management of Navy conventional ammunition stockpile. The center also conducts inspections, provides technical assistance and trains ordnance management and ammunition logistics.

=== Reserve Programs (SUP RES) ===
Reserve Programs (SUP RES) office acts as the principal advisor of the Commander and Vice Commander of NAVSUP in Navy Reserve matters. The office coordinates Navy Reserve manpower requirements, training, personnel utilization and career management. In addition, this office acts as the principle NAVSUP liaison with the Chief of Navy Reserve. The office also provides support to Reserve Supply Corps officers through personnel management and professional development programs.

=== Office of General Counsel (SUP OGC) ===
Office of General Counsel (SUP OGC) acts as the principal legal advisor to the Commander and Vice Commander of NAVSUP. The office provides legal advice on procurement, fiscal law, civilian personnel, labor relations, ethics, Freedom of Information Act requests, privacy, environmental law, congressional affairs, litigation, and NAVSUP field counsel offices network.

=== Public Affairs (SUP PA) ===
Public Affairs Office (SUP PA) manages strategic communications for the NAVSUP enterprise. The office provides public affairs guidance to senior leaders, develops internal and external communication strategies, manages media relations and produces informational and professional publications in support of NAVSUP mission and the Navy Supply Corps.

=== Office of Inspector General (SUP OIG) ===
Office of Inspector General (SUP OIG) provides independent oversight of NAVSUP programs and operations. The office conducts inspections, evaluations, investigations and special reviews in order to assess organizational effectiveness, ensure compliance with applicable policies and regulations, and identify areas of improvement. The Inspector General also maintains an additional duty relationship with the Naval Inspector General.

== Activities ==
In addition to its headquarters, NAVSUP consists of four major organizations and 11 commands situated across the globe.

NAVSUP Weapon Systems Support (NAVSUP WSS) provides program and supply support to Naval Weapon Systems. The NAVSUP Business Systems Center (NAVSUP BSC) develops and maintains information systems supporting supply chain management, transportation, and finance.

Navy Exchange Service Command (NEXCOM) facilitates the provision of goods and services to customers. It manages business programs such as Navy Exchange (NEX), the Navy Lodge Program, and the Uniform Program Management Office (UPMO).

NAVSUP Ammunition Logistics Center (NALC) is the fleet's ammunition support agent. They coordinate fleet requirements, conduct inspections, and perform other technical functions within the Navy Ordnance Enterprise.

The eight FLCs serve specific regions and naval activities:

- NAVSUP Fleet Logistics Center Bahrain, located in Manama, serves United States Naval Forces Central Command (CENTCOM) and the United States Fifth Fleet.
- NAVSUP Fleet Logistics Center Jacksonville serves naval activities throughout the Navy Region Southeast, from Texas to Cuba.
- NAVSUP Fleet Logistics Center Norfolk serves naval activities throughout the Navy Region Mid-Atlantic.
- NAVSUP Fleet Logistics Center Pearl Harbor serves naval activities throughout the Indo-Pacific.
- NAVSUP Fleet Logistics Center Puget Sound, located at Naval Base Kitsap, serves naval activities throughout the Pacific Rim.
- NAVSUP Fleet Logistics Center San Diego serves naval activities throughout the Navy Region Southwest.
- NAVSUP Fleet Logistics Center Sigonella serves naval activities throughout Europe, Africa, and the operations area of the United States Sixth Fleet.
- NAVSUP Fleet Logistics Center Yokosuka serves naval activities throughout the Western Pacific.

== See also ==
- Army Materiel Command
- Marine Corps Systems Command
- United States Navy systems commands
  - Naval Sea Systems Command
  - Naval Air Systems Command
  - Naval Information Warfare Systems Command
  - Naval Facilities Engineering Systems Command
- Air Force Materiel Command
- Space Systems Command
