= Bureau of Aeronautics =

1921–1959 United States Navy organization responsible for naval aviation

The Bureau of Aeronautics (BuAer) was the United States Navy's material-support organization for naval aviation from 1921 to 1959. The bureau had "cognizance" (i.e., responsibility) for the design, procurement, and support of naval aircraft and related systems. Aerial weapons, however, were under the cognizance of the Navy's Bureau of Ordnance (BuOrd).

== Origins ==
The USN's first attempt for naval aviation began in 1908 when it conducted observations of the Wright Brothers aircraft at Fort Myer.

== First tests and Naval Aviation Corps ==
The first test of an aircraft from naval vessel was in 1910 when a Curtiss Model D flown by Eugene Burton Ely took off from USS Birmingham (CL-2) and again on USS Pennsylvania (ACR-4) in early 1911. These tests were enough for the USN to establish naval aviation units in the summer of 1911. The purchase of the first naval aircraft in May 1911 and passage of naval appropriations act in August 1916 lead to the establishment of the Naval Reserve Flying Corps, which would train and deploy air corps for World War I.

== Formal Organization of Naval Aviation ==
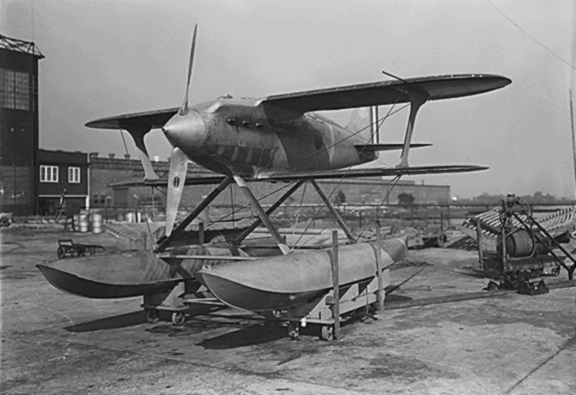
A Curtiss R3C at the Naval Aircraft Factory in Philadelphia in 1926

Congress established BuAer in 1921 in order to create a single organizational home for naval aviation. Prior to 1921, cognizance for aviation had been divided among various Navy bureaus and other organizations. The first Chief of BuAer was Rear Admiral William A. Moffett (1869–1933), a Medal of Honor recipient and battleship commander who had long supported the development of naval aviation. He served as bureau chief from 1921 until his death in 1933, in the crash of the airship USS Akron (ZRS-4). Working closely with RADM Moffett, CAPT Henry C. Mustin (1874–1923) served as BuAer's first Assistant Chief helping lead naval aviation to the forefront of American military strength.

A talented administrator, Moffett ensured the continued independence of naval aviation during the 1920s, when Army Brig. Gen. Billy Mitchell and others sought to merge all U.S. military aviation into a single, independent air force. Upon Moffett's death, he was succeeded as Chief of the Bureau by Rear Admiral Ernest J. King, a future fleet admiral and chief of naval operations during World War II. Other important bureau chiefs included Rear Admiral John S. McCain Sr., the grandfather of U.S. Senator John S. McCain III (R-Ariz.).

During the 1930s, BuAer presided over rapid technological change in naval aircraft. The bureau's policy was to limit its own production, in order to support the civilian aircraft industry. BuAer used the Naval Aircraft Factory in Philadelphia, Pennsylvania, as a facility for building small numbers of prototype aircraft.

== World War II and the postwar period ==
World War II brought immense changes as well. BuAer was forced to expand rapidly in order to comply with the nation's defense needs. By the war's end, the bureau had developed an administrative structure that oversaw thousands of personnel, and the procurement and maintenance of tens of thousands of aircraft. In 1943, the Navy established the position of Deputy Chief of Naval Operations for Air, or DCNO(Air), a move which relieved some of BuAer's responsibility for Fleet operations. RADM McCain, now promoted to vice admiral, was the first to fill the position.

BuAer downsized after the war, but continued its focus on aeronautical research and development. But as naval technology became increasingly complex, it became clear that the Navy's material organization was insufficient. In particular, the Navy needed better integration of aerial weapons with naval aircraft. There was also the question of "pilotless aircraft" (the ancestors of the late 20th century's unmanned aerial vehicles); BuAer considered these to be aircraft, while BuOrd saw them as guided missiles.

To fix the problem, in 1959 the Navy merged BuAer and BuOrd to create the Bureau of Naval Weapons (BuWeps). This was only a temporary solution, however, and in 1966 the Navy undertook a wholesale revision of its material organization. The bureau system, which had existed since the 1840s, was replaced with the "Systems Commands" (SYSCOMs). BuWeps was replaced with the current Naval Air Systems Command (NAVAIR).

== Bureau chiefs ==
Rear Admiral William A. Moffett	July 26, 1921 – April 4, 1933
Rear Admiral Ernest J. King	May 3, 1933 – June 12, 1936
Rear Admiral Arthur B. Cook	June 12, 1936 – June 1, 1939
Rear Admiral John H. Towers	June 1, 1939 – October 6, 1942
Rear Admiral John S. McCain Sr.	October 9, 1942 – August 7, 1943
Rear Admiral DeWitt C. Ramsey	August 7, 1943 – June 1, 1945
Rear Admiral Harold B. Sallada	June 1, 1945 – May 1, 1947
Rear Admiral Alfred M. Pride	May 1, 1947 – May 1, 1951
Rear Admiral Thomas S. Combs	May 1, 1951 – June 30, 1953
Rear Admiral Apollo Soucek	June 30, 1953 – March 4, 1955
Rear Admiral James S. Russell	March 4, 1955 – July 15, 1957
Rear Admiral Robert E. Dixon	July 15, 1957 – December 1, 1959

== See also ==
- Naval Aviation Photographic Unit
