= Naval Sea Systems Command =

Largest of the five "systems commands" of the United States Navy

Coordinates: 38°52′26.1″N 76°59′44.1″W

Naval Sea Systems Command (NAVSEA)
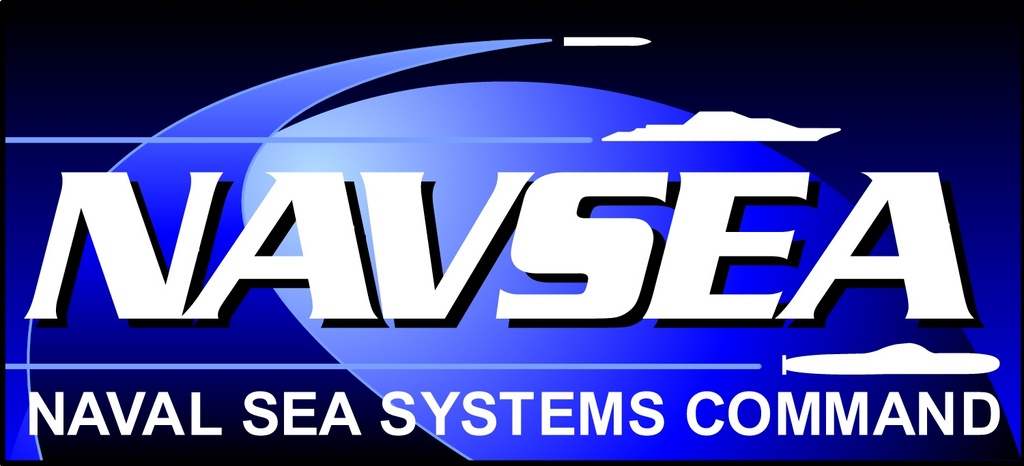
- Founded: 1974
- Allegiance: United States
- Branch: United States Navy
- Type: SYSCOM
- Role: Materiel support
- Garrison/HQ: Washington Navy Yard, Washington D.C., U.S.

Commanders
- Commander: VADM Pete Small
- Executive Director: Mr. Christopher Miller
- Chief of Staff: Captain Milton W. Troy, III
- Command Master Chief: CMDCM Blake G. Schimmel

The Naval Sea Systems Command (NAVSEA) is the largest of the United States Navy's five "systems commands," or materiel (not to be confused with "material") organizations. From a physical perspective, NAVSEA has four shipyards for shipbuilding, conversion, and repair, ten "warfare centers" (two undersea and eight surface), the NAVSEA headquarters, located at the Washington Navy Yard, in Washington D.C., and other locations in 15 states and 3 overseas continents.

NAVSEA's primary objective is to engineer, build, buy, and maintain the U.S. Navy's fleet of ships and its combat systems. NAVSEA's budget of almost $30 billion accounts for nearly one quarter of the Navy's entire budget, with more than 80,200 personnel and 150 acquisition programs under its oversight.

== History ==
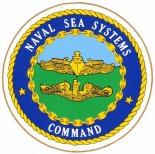
Seal of the Naval Sea Systems Command (historic)

The origin of NAVSEA dates to 1794, when Commodore John Barry was charged to oversee the construction of a 44-gun frigate and ensure that all business "harmonized and conformed" to the public's interest. Since then various organizations were established and succeeded them to oversee design, construction and repair of ships and ordnance.

Established in 1940, Bureau of Ships (BuShips) succeeded the Bureau of Construction and Repair, which had been responsible for ship design and construction, and the Bureau of Engineering, which had been responsible for propulsion systems. These bureaus traced their origins back to earlier organizations.

The Naval Ship Systems Command was established on May 1, 1966 replacing BuShips.

The Naval Sea Systems Command was established on July 1, 1974 with the merger of the Naval Ship Systems Command (NAVSHIPS) with the Naval Ordnance Command (NAVORD). NAVORD was the successor to the Bureau of Naval Weapons and the earlier Bureau of Ordnance.

=== Command history ===
The following are the current and previous NAVSEA commanders since 1974:

- Vice Adm. Pete Small, August 2026 – present
- Vice Adm. James P. Downey, January 2024 – August 2026
- Rear Adm. Thomas J. Anderson, September 2023 – January 2024 (acting)
- Vice Adm. William J. Galinis, June 2020 – September 2023
- Vice Adm. Thomas J. Moore, June 2016 – June 2020
- Vice Adm. William H. Hilarides, June 2013 – June 2016
- Vice Adm. Kevin M. McCoy, June 2008 – June 2013
- Vice Adm. Paul E. Sullivan, July 2005 – August 2008
- Vice Adm. Phillip Balisle, June 2002 – July 2005
- Vice Adm. Pete Nanos, May 1998 – June 2002
- Vice Adm. George R. Sterner, April 25, 1994 - May 1, 1998
- Vice Adm. Kenneth C. Malley, 1991–1994
- Vice Adm. Peter M. Hekman Jr., September 1988 – 1991
- Vice Adm. William H. Rowden, 1985–1988
- Vice Adm. Earl B. Fowler Jr., March 1980 – 1985
- Vice Adm. Clarence R. Bryan, September 1976 – 1980
- Vice Adm. Robert C. Gooding, July 1974 – 1976

== Directorates ==
NAVSEA's activities are organized under nine directorates at the Echelon II level. The directorates are:

- Comptroller (SEA 01): Provides financial policy, budgeting, accounting, and manages appropriation areas.
- Contracts (SEA 02): Awards nearly $24 billion in contracts annually for new construction ships and submarines, ship repair, major weapon systems and services.
- Cyber Engineering and Digital Transformation Directorate (SEA 03): Delivers enterprise digital capabilities and infrastructure for cyber-secure digital work and innovation.
- Logistics, Maintenance and Industrial Operations (SEA 04): Gets ships to sea and keeps them ready. SEA04 manages the four Naval Shipyards.
- Naval Systems Engineering Directorate (SEA 05): Provides the engineering and scientific expertise necessary to design, build, maintain, repair, modernize, certify, and dispose of the Navy's ships, submarines, and associated warfare systems.
- Undersea Warfare (SEA 07): Provides research, development, test and evaluation, engineering, and fleet support services to the in-service submarine and undersea forces.
- Naval Nuclear Propulsion (SEA 08): Also known as Naval Reactors or as the Naval Nuclear Propulsion Program, responsible for the safe and reliable operation of the Navy's nuclear propulsion program.
- Corporate Operations (SEA 10): Performs all operations support for NAVSEA directorates and field activities as well as PEOs.
- Surface Warfare (SEA 21): Manages the maintenance and modernization of non-nuclear surface ships currently operating in the fleet; also oversees the ship inactivation process, including ship transfers or sales to foreign navies, inactivation, and/or disposal.
  - Warfighting Capability and Enterprise Readiness (SEA 06): Disestablished and aligned within other directorates as of 1 October 2020.

== Program Executive Offices (PEO) ==
NAVSEA's eight affiliated Program Executive Offices (PEOs) are responsible for the development and acquisition of Navy and Marine Corps platforms and weapons systems. PEOs report to the NAVSEA commander for planning and execution of in-service support, and to the Assistant Secretary of the Navy (Research, Development and Acquisition) for acquisition-related matters.

The NAVSEA affiliated PEOs are:

- Program Executive Officer, Aircraft Carriers (PEO Carriers)
- Program Executive Officer, Integrated Warfare Systems (PEO IWS)
- Program Executive Officer, Unmanned and Small Combatants (PEO USC)
- Program Executive Officer, Ships (PEO Ships)
- Program Executive Officer, Undersea Warfare Systems (PEO UWS)
- Program Executive Officer, Attack Submarines (PEO SSN)
- Program Executive Officer, Strategic Submarines (PEO SSBN)
- AUKUS Direct Reporting Program Office, and Integration & Acquisition Office

== Field activities ==
NAVSEA has numerous field activities geographically dispersed throughout the country that are providing the engineering, scientific, technical and logistical expertise, products and support to the Fleet, Department of Defense, and other customers.

- Aegis Ballistic Missile Defense System
- Navy Experimental Diving Unit (NEDU)
- Naval Ordnance Safety and Security Activity (NOSSA)
- Submarine Maintenance Engineering and Planning and Procurement Office (SUBMEPP)
- Supervisor of Salvage and Diving (SUPSALV)
- Surface Combat Systems Center (SCSC)
- Surface Maintenance Engineering Planning Program (SURFMEPP)

== Facilities ==
=== NAVSEA Headquarters ===
Washington Navy Yard – Washington D.C.

=== Aegis Technical Representative (AEGIS TECHREP) ===
- Vice Admiral James H. Doyle Jr. Combat System Engineering Development Site (CSEDS).

=== Warfare Centers ===
==== Naval Surface Warfare Centers (NSWC) ====
- NSWC Carderock Division – Carderock, Maryland
- NSWC Corona Division – Norco, California
- NSWC Crane Division – Crane, Indiana
- NSWC Dahlgren Division – Dahlgren, Virginia
  - Dam Neck Combat Direction Systems Activity – Virginia Beach, VA
- NSWC Indian Head Division – Charles County, Maryland
  - EOD Technology Division – part of NSWC Indian Head
  - Expeditionary Exploitation Unit ONE (EXU-1)
- NSWC Panama City Division – Panama City, Florida
- NSWC Philadelphia Division – Philadelphia, Pennsylvania
- NSWC Port Hueneme Division – Port Hueneme, California

==== Naval Undersea Warfare Center (NUWC) ====
- NUWC Keyport Division – Keyport, Washington
- NUWC Newport Division - Newport, Rhode Island
  - Atlantic Undersea Test and Evaluation Center (AUTEC) (NUWC Newport Det. Newport) – Andros Island, Bahamas

==== Naval Sea Logistics Center ====
- Located in Mechanicsburg, PA

=== Supervisors of Shipbuilding (SUPSHIP) ===
- SUPSHIP Groton – Groton, Connecticut
- SUPSHIP Bath – Bath, Maine
- SUPSHIP Gulf Coast – Pascagoula, Mississippi
- SUPSHIP Newport News – Newport News, Virginia

=== Naval Shipyards ===
- Norfolk Naval Shipyard – Portsmouth, Virginia
- Portsmouth Naval Shipyard – Kittery, Maine
- Pearl Harbor Naval Shipyard – Hawaii
- Puget Sound Naval Shipyard – Bremerton, Washington

=== Navy Regional Maintenance Centers ===
- Forward Deployed Regional Maintenance Center (FDRMC) headquartered in Naples, Italy with Detachments in Yokosuka, Japan, Manama, Bahrain & Rota, Spain
- Mid-Atlantic Regional Maintenance Center (MARMC) in Norfolk, Virginia
- Southeast Regional Maintenance Center (SERMC) in Naval Station Mayport
- Southwest Regional Maintenance Center (SWRMC) in San Diego, California

=== NAVSEA Contracted U.S. Federal Laboratory ===
- Allegany Ballistics Laboratory – Rocket Center, West Virginia

== See also ==
U.S. Armed Forces systems commands

- Army Materiel Command
- Marine Corps Systems Command
- United States Navy systems commands
  - Naval Air Systems Command
  - Naval Information Warfare Systems Command
  - Naval Facilities Engineering Systems Command
  - Naval Supply Systems Command
- Air Force Materiel Command
- Space Systems Command
