= Kings =

Kings or King's may refer to:

- The plural of any King (disambiguation)
  - King, the sovereign head of state and/or nation
- One of several works known as the "Book of Kings":
  - The Books of Kings part of the Bible, divided into two parts
  - The Shahnameh, an 11th-century epic Persian poem
  - The Morgan Bible, a French medieval picture Bible
  - The Pararaton, a 16th-century Javanese history of southeast Asia

== Business ==
- Kings Family Restaurants, a chain of restaurants in Pennsylvania and Ohio
- Kings Food Markets, a chain supermarket in northern New Jersey
- King's Favourites, a brand of cigarettes
- King's Variety Store, a chain of stores in the USA
- King's (defunct discount store), a defunct chain of discount stores in the USA

== Education ==
- King's College (disambiguation), various colleges
- King's School (disambiguation), various schools
- The King's Academy (disambiguation), various academies

== Electoral districts ==
- King's (New Brunswick federal electoral district) (1867–1903)
- Kings (Nova Scotia federal electoral district) (1867–1924)
- Kings (Nova Scotia provincial electoral district) (1867–1956)
- King's (Prince Edward Island electoral district) (1892–1966)

== Entertainment ==
- Kings (card game), a popular drinking game also known as King's Cup
- Kings (play-by-mail game)

=== Film and television ===
- Kings (Australian TV series), an Australian TV series
- Kings (U.S. TV series), an American TV series
- Oi Vasiliades ("The Kings"), a Greek comedy show
- Los Reyes (TV series) ("The Kings"), a Colombian drama
- Kings (2007 film), a 2007 Irish language film by Tom Collins
- Kings (2017 film), a 2017 film starring Halle Berry and Daniel Craig

=== Music ===
- "Kings" (The Pierces song), a song by The Pierces on the album Creation
- "Kings" (Steely Dan song), a song by rock group Steely Dan on the album Can't Buy a Thrill
- The Kings, a Canadian rock band formed in 1977
- Kings (musician), a New Zealand producer, rapper and singer-songwriter
- Kings (album), by I Am Empire

== Places ==
- Kings Bay (disambiguation), the name of several bays
- Kings County (disambiguation)
- King County (disambiguation)
- Kings, Ogle County, Illinois, an unincorporated community in Ogle County, Illinois
- Kings Dominion, an amusement park in Doswell, Virginia
- Kings Island, an amusement park in Mason, Ohio

== Sports ==
- Barangay Ginebra Kings, a Philippine basketball team
- Brooklyn Kings RLFC, a rugby league team in Brooklyn, New York
- Chennai Super Kings, an Indian Premier League team based in Chennai, Tamil Nadu
- Chittagong Kings, former name of the Chattogram Challengers, a Bangladesh Premier League team based in Chittagong
- Cincinnati Kings, a USL Premier Development League soccer team based in Cincinnati, Ohio
- Eastern Province Kings, the former name of the Eastern Province Elephants, a provincial rugby union team based in Port Elizabeth, South Africa
- Karachi Kings, a Pakistan Super League team based in Karachi, Sindh
- Kings (handball), also known as "Chinese handball"
- Kings League, a seven-a-side football league based in Spain
- Punjab Kings formerly Kings XI Punjab, an Indian Premier League team based in Mohali, Punjab
- The Kings of Wrestling or The Kings of Wrestling (TNA)
- Los Angeles Kings, an NHL team based in Los Angeles, California
- Powell River Kings, a junior ice hockey team in Powell River, British Columbia
- Rethymno Cretan Kings B.C., a Greek basketball team
- Sacramento Kings, an NBA team based in Sacramento, California
- Saint Lucia Kings, a Caribbean Premier League cricket team, affiliated with Punjab Kings
- Southern Kings, a Super Rugby team based in Port Elizabeth, South Africa
- Sydney Kings, an Australian basketball team

== See also ==
- Kings River (disambiguation)
- King (disambiguation)
