= Timeline of Bujumbura =

The following is a timeline of the history of the city of Bujumbura, Burundi.

== Prior to 20th century ==
- 1885 - Mohamed Bin Khalfan in power in region.
- 1899 - Germans establish military settlement at village of Usumbura in colonial German East Africa.

== 20th century ==
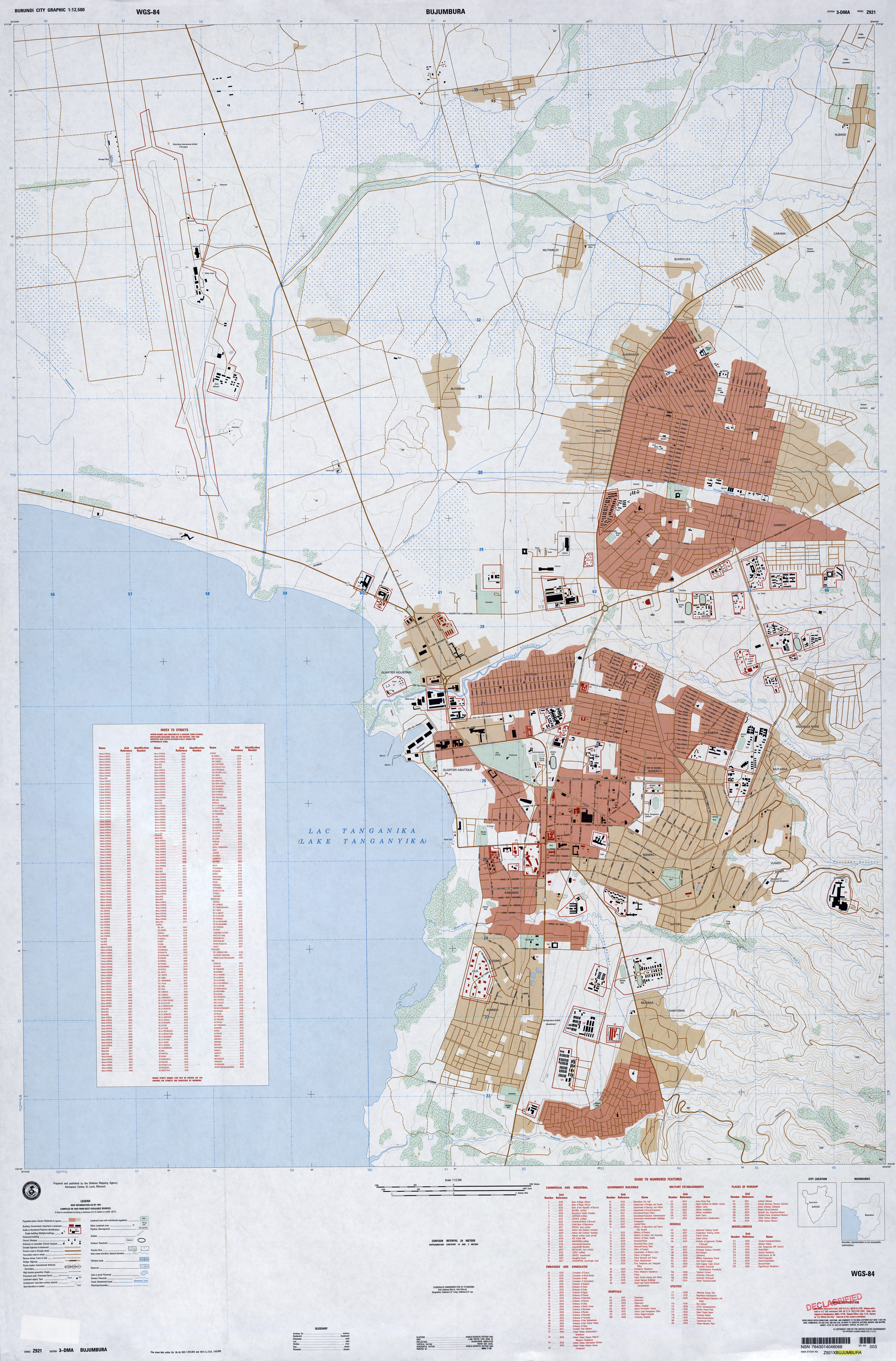
Map of Bujumbura, 1991

- 1912 - Usumbura becomes capital of Ruanda-Urundi.
- 1916 - Belgians in power in Ruanda-Urundi.
- 1928 - Buyenzi neighborhood created.
- 1932 - Kabondo neighborhood created.
- 1941 - Kabondo neighborhood razed due to poor public health.
- 1945 - Kamenge and Kinama neighborhoods created.
- 1952 - Bujumbura Airport opens.
- 1955 - Holy Spirit Lycée (school) active.
- 1959
  - Port of Bujumbura is built
  - Roman Catholic diocese of Usumbura established.
- 1960
  - University of Burundi founded.
  - Radio nationale begins broadcasting.
- 1962
  - City becomes national capital of newly formed Burundi; Usumbura renamed "Bujumbura."
  - Gérard Kibinakanwa becomes mayor.
- 1963
  - Cibitoke neighborhood created.
  - Maniema FC (football club) formed.
- 1965 - École Belge de Bujumbura (school) opens.
- 1970 - Population: 78,810 (urban agglomeration).
- 1978 - Renouveau du Burundi government newspaper begins publication.
- 1984 - Télévision nationale begins broadcasting.
- 1990 - Population: 235,440.
- 1991 - Kamenge Youth Centre established.
- 1995
  - Ethnic violence during the Burundian Civil War.
  - 11 March: Government official Ernest Kabushemeye killed.
- 1996
  - Army-rebel (Tutsi-Hutu) conflict, especially in Kamenge.
  - Radio Umwizero begins broadcasting.
- 1998 - Civilians killed by Hutu rebels at airport.
- 2000
  - 13 October: Army-rebel (Tutsi-Hutu) conflict occurs near city.
  - 31 December: Civilians killed by Hutu rebels near city.

== 21st century ==
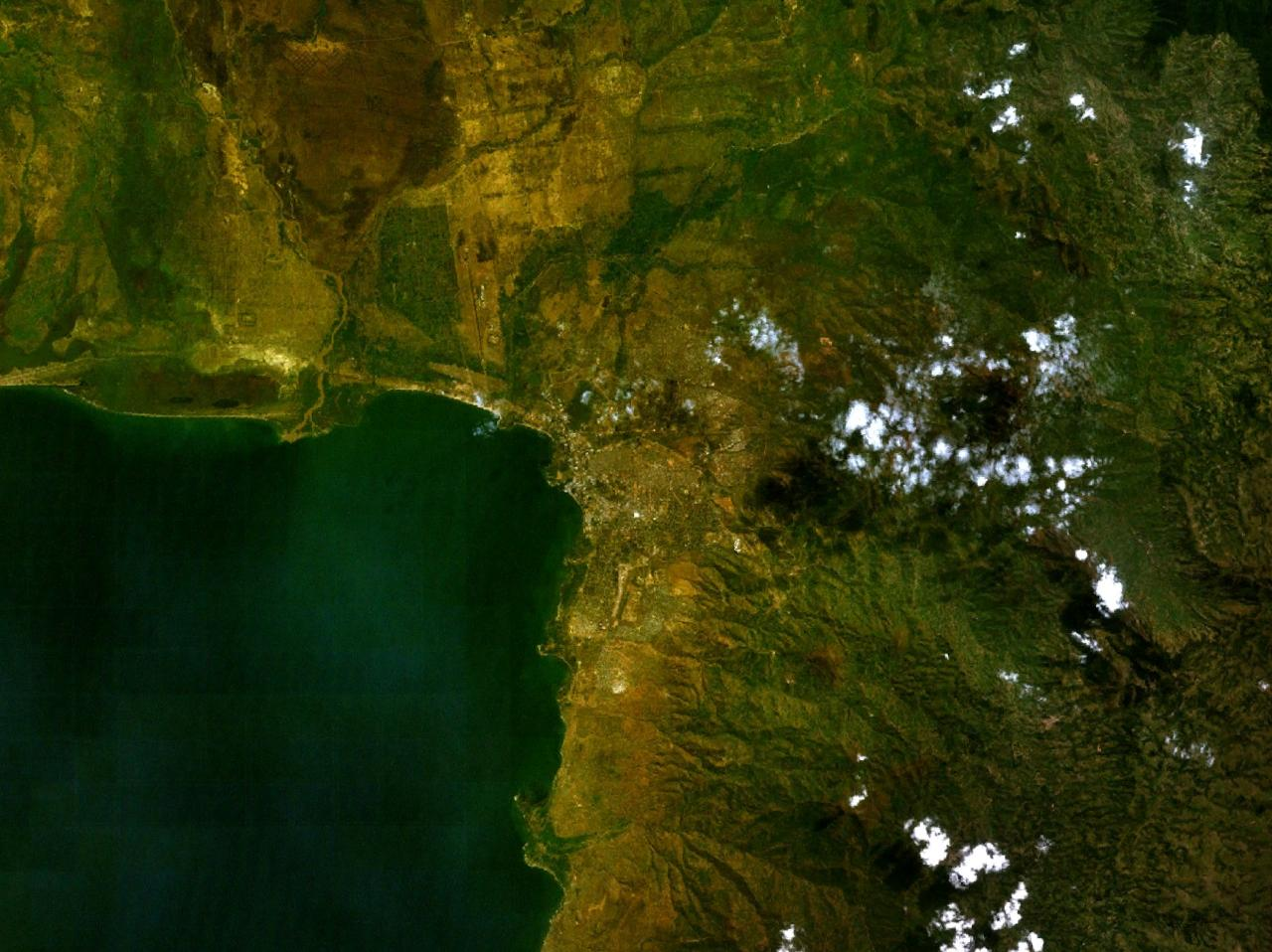
Satellite view of Bujumbura, 2005

- 2003
  - City besieged by rebel forces.
  - April: Peacekeeping African Union Mission in Burundi headquartered in city.
- 2005 - City administration divided into 13 neighborhoods: Buterere, Buyenzi, Bwiza, Cibitoke, Gihosha, Kamenge, Kanyosha, Kinama, Kinindo, Musaga, Ngagara, Nyakabiga, and Rohero. Each has its own council and leader.
- 2007 - September: Conflict between factions of the National Forces of Liberation.
- 2008 - Population: 497,169.
- 2011 - 30 November: East African Community summit held in city.
- 2012
  - March: Labor strike.
  - Saidi Juma becomes mayor.
- 2013 - Central market burns down.
- 2015 - Burundian unrest (2015–present).
- 2018 December 24 - Bujumbura was designated as Economic capital and Gitega as the new Political capital.
- June 2025 - Bujumbura increased in overall size under the new administrative subdivision by ecompassing neighboring Bujumbura Rural, Bubanza and Cibitoke.

== See also ==
- Bujumbura history (fr)
- List of mayors of Bujumbura
- Timeline of Burundian history

== Bibliography ==
in English

- C. Achikbache; et al. (1982). "Bujumbura: Muslim demographic and socio-economic aspects". Journal of the Institute of Muslim Minority Affairs. 4 (4): 145–174. doi:10.1080/02666958208715865. ISSN 0266-6952.
- Nancy Rose Hunt (1990). "Domesticity and Colonialism in Belgian Africa: Usumbura's Foyer Social, 1946-1960". Signs. 15 (3): 447–474. doi:10.1086/494605. JSTOR 3174423. S2CID 145204059.
- Paul Tiyambe Zeleza; Dickson Eyoh, eds. (2003). "Bujumbura, Burundi". Encyclopedia of Twentieth-Century African History. Routledge. ISBN 0415234794.
- Eric Young (2010). "Bujumbura, Burundi". In Kwame Anthony Appiah; Henry Louis Gates (eds.). Encyclopedia of Africa. Oxford University Press. p. 209. ISBN 9780195337709.
- Roman A. Cybriwsky (2013). "Bujumbura". Capital Cities around the World: An Encyclopedia of Geography, History, and Culture. ABC-CLIO. ISBN 978-1-61069-248-9.

in French

- Sylvestre Ndayirukiye, Bujumbura centenaire : 1897-1997 : croissance et défis, L'Harmattan, Paris, 2002, 375 p. ISBN 2-7475-1302-5
- S. Ndayirukire (2006). "La rehabilitation et la protection du patrimoine culturel national: les monuments et les édifices anciens dans la ville de Bujumbura". Culture et société (in French). 16. Bujumbura: Centre de civilisation burundaise. ISSN 0255-6308.
- Pascal Rutaké; et al. (2011). "Planification et politiques de santé en milieu urbain: cas de la mairie de Bujumbura". Cahier du CURDES (12). University of Burundi, Centre Universitaire de Recherche pour le Développement Economique et Social.
- Burundi: Profil Urbain De Bujumbura (in French). United Nations Human Settlements Programme. 2012.

in German

- "Usumbura". Deutsches Kolonial-Lexikon (in German). 1920 – via Universitätsbibliothek Frankfurt.
