= King's School =

The King's School may refer to:

== Schools ==
=== United Kingdom ===
The original seven schools established or renamed by King Henry VIII in 1541:

- The King's School, Canterbury
- King's School, Chester
- King's Ely, Cambridgeshire
- The King's School, Gloucester
- The King's (The Cathedral) School, Peterborough
- King's School, Rochester
- King's School, Worcester

Other schools of this name in the United Kingdom include:

- King's School, Bruton, Somerset
- King's College School, Cambridge, Cambridgeshire
- The King's School, Fair Oak, Hampshire
- The King's School, Grantham, Lincolnshire
- The King's School (Harpenden), Hertfordshire
- King's School, Hove, East Sussex
- King's School, Macclesfield, Cheshire
- The King's School, Ottery St Mary, Devon
- King's School, Pontefract, West Yorkshire
- Kings Priory School, Tynemouth, Tyne and Wear
- King's College School, Wimbledon, London
- Kings' School, Winchester, Hampshire
- King's School, Witney, Oxfordshire

=== Other countries ===
Australasia

- King's School (Auckland), Remuera, Auckland, New Zealand
- King's High School, Dunedin, New Zealand
- The King's School, Parramatta, Sydney, New South Wales, Australia

Others

- King's School (Burundi)
- King's School (Gütersloh), Gütersloh, Germany
- The King's School, Manila, Philippines
- King's School, Mugalli, Goa, India
- King's Schools, a private Christian school in North Seattle, Washington

== Other uses ==
- King's School (PAT station), a light railway stop in Bethel Park, Pennsylvania

== See also ==
- The King's Academy (disambiguation)
- King's College (disambiguation)
- Kings (disambiguation)
- King School
- King Schools, Inc.
- King Schoolhouse
