= Naval Information Warfare Center Atlantic =

Echelon III activity of the United States Navy

Coordinates: 32°57′55.8″N 79°58′16.7″W

Naval Information Warfare Center Atlantic (NIWC Atlantic)
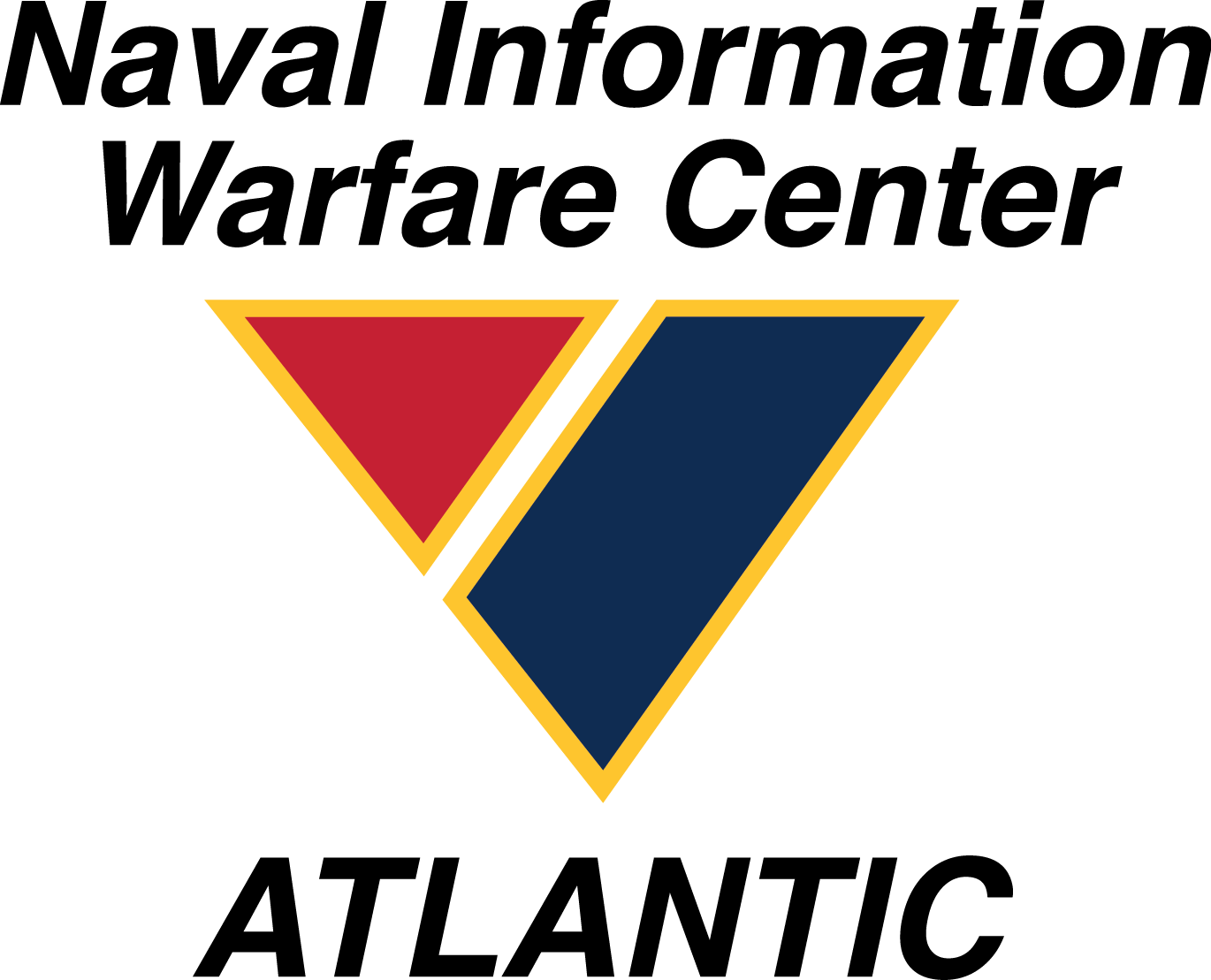
- Founded: 1978; 48 years ago
- Allegiance: United States of America
- Branch: United States Navy
- Part of: Naval Information Warfare Systems Command
- Garrison/HQ: Naval Support Activity Charleston, South Carolina, U.S.

Commanders
- Commander: CAPT Matthew R. O'Neal, USN
- Executive Director: Peter C. Reddy, SES

The Naval Information Warfare Center Atlantic (NIWC Atlantic) is an Echelon III activity of the United States Navy located in North Charleston, South Carolina.

The center’s mission is to deliver information warfare solutions that protect national security Conduct research, development, prototyping, engineering, test and evaluation, installation, and sustainment of integrated information warfare capabilities and services across all warfighting domains with an emphasis on Expeditionary Tactical Capabilities & Enterprise IT and Business Systems in order to drive innovation and warfighter information advantage. This includes communication systems (radios), networking systems (routers/switches), cyber operations (red team/forensics/network defense), intelligence, surveillance, reconnaissance (sensors/decision support applications), business systems (benefits/personnel) and information security.

Effective February 18, 2019, the names of the systems center changed from Space and Naval Warfare Systems Center Atlantic (SPAWAR) to Naval Information Warfare Center Atlantic.

== Structure of NAVWAR ==
NIWC Atlantic is one of three Echelon III activities reporting to the Commander, Naval Information Warfare Systems Command (NAVWARSYSCOM) in San Diego, California. NAVWARSYSCOM, an Echelon II command, reports to the Echelon I Chief of Naval Operations on the military side and the Assistant Secretary of the Navy (Research, Development and Acquisition) on the civilian side.

The other two Echelon III activities under NAVWARSYSCOM are the Naval Information Warfare Center Pacific and NAVWAR Space Field Activity.

== Locations and personnel ==
NIWC Atlantic is headquartered at the Naval Support Activity Charleston in Hanahan, South Carolina, which is part of Joint Base Charleston. The center is staffed by almost 5,000 personnel, with 53% in science and engineering occupations.

In the Charleston area, about 3,050 personnel perform most activities in 71 buildings centered around the HQ Building in the southwestern corner of NSA Charleston. Two integration facilities reside on the grounds of the former Charleston Naval Shipyard.

Other major locations which are part of NIWC Atlantic include:

- Just below 1,000 personnel in Hampton Roads, Virginia, co-located with Fleet Forces Command and NAVIFOR.
- About 260 personnel in New Orleans, Louisiana.
- About 200 personnel in the Naval District Washington (NDW) (formerly, National Capital Region (NCR)), Washington, DC.
- About 560 personnel in other CONUS and OCONUS satellite locations in:
  - Tampa, FL
  - Fayetteville, NC
  - Pax River, MD
  - Kings Bay, GA
  - Mayport, FL
  - Groton, CT
  - Quantico, VA
  - Stuttgart, Germany
  - Naples, Italy
  - Manama, Bahrain
  - Rota, Spain
  - Okinawa, Japan

== Organization ==
NIWC Atlantic activities are organized into 5 departments with 107 integrated product teams and almost 629 projects.

The five departments are (with FY 2023 numbers):

- Fleet C4I and Readiness: About 1,500 personnel and 160 projects.
- Expeditionary Warfare: About 660 personnel and 75 projects.
- Enterprise Systems: About 600 personnel and 70 projects.
- Shore C2ISR and Integration: About 756 personnel and 125 projects.
- Science and Technology: About 200 personnel and 205 projects.

== See also ==
- Naval Information Warfare Systems Command
- Naval Information Warfare Center Pacific
- NAVWAR Space Field Activity
