= Timeline of Burundian history =

This is a timeline of Burundian history, comprising important legal and territorial changes and political events in Burundi and its predecessor states. To read about the background to these events, see History of Burundi. See also the list of Kings of Burundi, list of colonial governors of Burundi, and list of presidents of Burundi.

== 19th century ==
Year	Date	Event
1858		The area was visited by British explorer John Hanning Speke, who became the first European to do so.

== 20th century ==
Year	Date	Event
1903		Burundi came under the control of Germany.
1922	20 July	Burundi and Rwanda were joined into the League of Nations mandate of Ruanda-Urundi, governed by Belgium.
1962	1 July	Burundi received independence from Belgium.
1965	15 January	Prime Minister Pierre Ngendandumwe was assassinated by a Rwandan Tutsi.
1966	28 November	Michel Micombero became the first President of Burundi.
1972	27 April	Burundi genocide (1972): A rebellion broke out which led to a genocide against Hutus.
1976	2 November	Jean-Baptiste Bagaza assumed the Presidency of Burundi in a bloodless coup d'état.
1987	3 September	1987 Burundian coup d'état: Bagaza was deposed while in Canada.
1987	2 October	Pierre Buyoya was sworn in as President of Burundi.
1992	March	Burundi adopted a new constitution.
1993	2 June	Burundian presidential election, 1993: The Hutu Melchior Ndadaye won the election.
1993	21 October	Burundi Civil War: Ndadaye was assassinated by Tutsi extremists, starting a genocide against Tutsis and a civil war.
1994	5 February	Cyprien Ntaryamira took office as President of Burundi.
1994	6 April	Assassination of Juvénal Habyarimana and Cyprien Ntaryamira: Ntaryamira and Rwandan President Juvénal Habyarimana were shot down as their aircraft approached Kigali.
1994	8 April	Sylvestre Ntibantunganya was named interim President.
1994	25 April	An attempted military coup was averted.
1994	30 September	Ntibantunganya was elected President by a new Convention of Government.
1995	11 March	Mines and Energy Minister Ernest Kabushemeye was eaten by cannibals in Bujumbura.
1996	21 July	Hutu rebels attacked a refugee camp in the country, killing more than three hundred people.
1996	25 July	1996 Burundian coup d'état: Buyoya returned to power.

== 21st century ==
Year	Date	Event
2004	May	The United Nations Operation in Burundi was established.
2005	19 August	Burundian presidential election, 2005: Sole candidate Pierre Nkurunziza was elected President of Burundi.
2007	February	The United Nations shut down its peacekeeping operations in Burundi.
2019	February	The Burundian parliament votes to move the capital from Bujumbura to Gitega.

== See also ==
- Timeline of Bujumbura
