= King game =

King game, Kings game, or King games may refer to:

- Konpa § King game, a Japanese drinking game using stacks of paper
- Kings (card game), a drinking game using playing cards
- Kings (play-by-mail game)
- King's Game, 2004 Danish film
- Ōsama Game (English: King Game), Japanese novel
- Burger King games, a series of video games showed at Burger King
- King (company), Swedish-British video game developer
- King (card game), Russian card game similar to Hearts

== See also ==
- King (disambiguation) § Gaming
