= Naval Information Warfare Center Pacific =

Echelon III activity of the United States Navy

Coordinates: 32°44′57″N 117°11′50″W

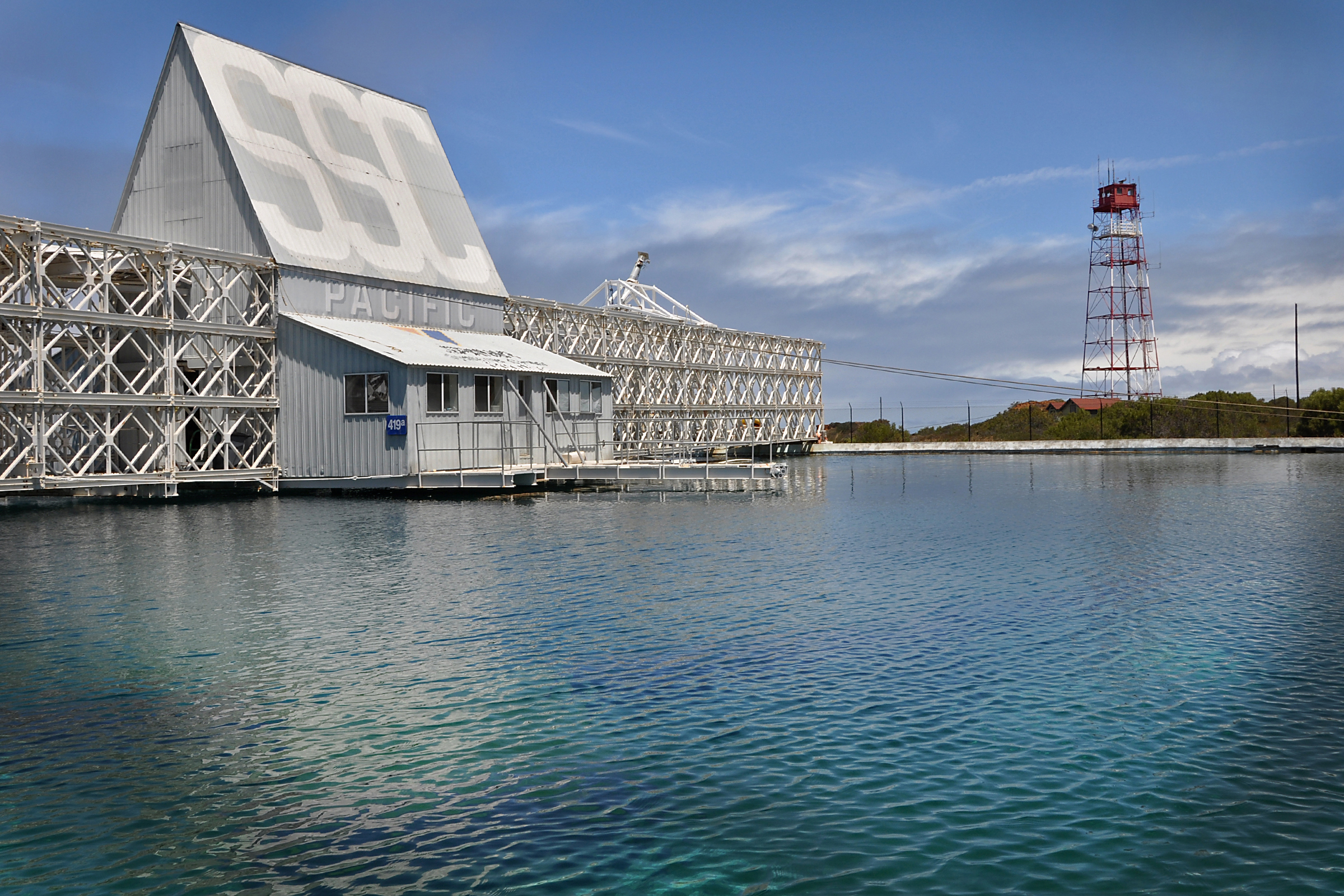
TRANSDEC testing facility at SPAWAR Systems Center Pacific

The Naval Information Warfare Center Pacific (NIWC Pacific), formerly the Space and Naval Warfare Systems Center Pacific (SPAWAR Systems Center Pacific or SSC Pacific), the Naval Command, Control and Ocean Surveillance Center (NCCOSC) RDT&E Division, the Space and Naval Warfare Systems Center San Diego, and the Naval Ocean Systems Center (NOSC), provides the U.S. Navy with research, development, delivery and support of integrated command, control, communications, computers, intelligence, surveillance and reconnaissance (C4ISR), cyber and space systems and capabilities across all warfighting domains. The only Naval technical center headquartered in a major fleet concentration area, NIWC Pacific manages strategic locations both in the Pacific theater and around the world.

NIWC Pacific is advancing the Navy's employment of next generation unmanned systems and autonomous vehicles, large data management, antenna design, clean and renewable energy sources, and both offensive and defensive cyber programs. As the primary research arm of the Naval Information Warfare Systems Command (NAVWAR), NIWC Pacific supports basic research and prototype development, basic and applied science, extensive testing and evaluation services, systems engineering and integration, installation and full spectrum life-cycle support of fielded systems with worldwide connectivity and numerous partnerships with private industry and academia, NIWC Pacific addresses warfighting requirements for Navy, Joint, National and Coalition war fighters.

The laboratory operates as a Naval Working Capital Fund organization and relies on funding from both Navy and non-Navy sponsors rather than direct Congressional appropriations. The vast majority of its workforce is located in San Diego, California, with detachments located in Hawaii, Guam, and Japan.

== History ==
On June 1, 1940, Secretary of the Navy Frank Knox established the Navy's first laboratory on the West Coast, the U.S. Navy Radio and Sound Laboratory. Its mission was to perform research and development in communications and radio propagation. In 1943, a second West Coast laboratory was established in the high desert at Inyokern, California, the Naval Ordnance Test Station (NOTS), charged with improving naval weapons systems, particularly those dropped from aircraft.

Over the next several decades, those two organizations changed names several times: the U.S. Navy Radio and Sound Lab became the U.S. Navy Electronics Laboratory, the Naval Command Control and Communications Laboratory Center, and the Naval Electronics Laboratory Center (NELC); while NOTS became the Naval Undersea Warfare Center, the Naval Undersea Research and Development Center, and the Naval Undersea Center (NUC). On March 1, 1977, NELC and NUC were consolidated to form the Naval Ocean Systems Center (NOSC).

These Navy research, development, test and evaluation (RDT&E) organizations specialized in command, control and communications (C3); Arctic submarine warfare; undersea weapons systems; intelligence and undersea surveillance technology, as well as a number of other important areas including lasers, underwater vehicles, environmental science, high performance computing, robotics, and marine mammal research.

During the 1990s, NOSC was renamed following several Base Closure and Realignment Commission (BRAC) actions starting with the Naval Command, Control and Ocean Surveillance Center (NCCOSC) RDT&E Division, then the Space and Naval Warfare Systems Center San Diego; also added were a number of other Navy commands, including the NCCOSC In-Service Engineering (NISE) West Coast Division; and some substantive changes in business areas, including the loss of leadership roles in anti-submarine warfare weapons systems and Arctic submarine warfare, and the gain of in-service engineering functions and navigation technology. In late 2008, the organization was assigned the name Space and Naval Warfare Systems Center Pacific (SSC Pacific). In early 2019, the organization was assigned its current name, Naval Information Warfare Center Pacific (NIWC Pacific).

== NAVWAR in San Diego ==
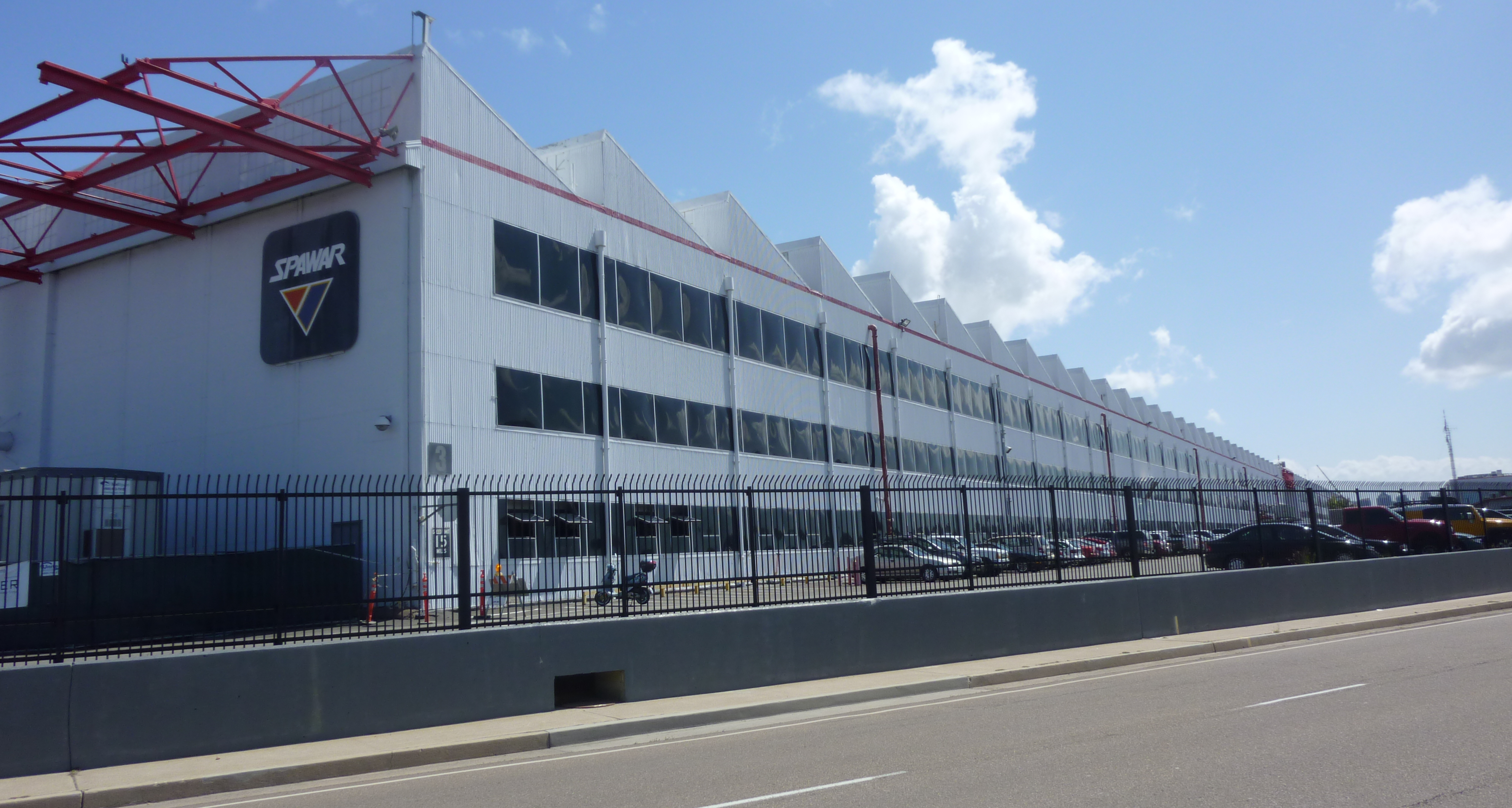
NAVWAR Headquarters

In 1997, San Diego became the headquarters of the Navy's Space and Naval Warfare Systems Command (SPAWAR), now the Naval Information Warfare Systems Command (NAVWAR), formerly located in the Washington, D.C., area and is now located in the Old Town neighborhood. NAVWAR and its subordinate Echelon III Activities provide much of the tactical and non-tactical information management technology required by the Navy to complete its operational missions. These include NIWC Pacific, its counterpart, NIWC Atlantic, located in Charleston, South Carolina, along with the NAVWAR Space Field Activity, located in Chantilly, Virginia.

NAVWAR headquarters in San Diego, California, is registered as an active superfund clean-up site by the EPA. In September 2014, more than 150 employees in the public affairs and engineering departments of SPAWAR's facility in the Old Town neighborhood had to be moved to other spaces within Old Town Campus to avoid toxic trichloroethylene (TCE) vapors. Soil and groundwater beneath the Naval site is contaminated with byproducts from World War II era missile and aircraft production. TCE is a volatile metal-cleaning agent. Since 2011, the Navy has been removing toxic waste, which has reduced TCE levels beneath the building. The Navy plans to complete its cleanup by 2018.

In October 2018, the Navy said it is planning to renovate or redevelop the Old Town site, and issued a Request for Interest to recruit possible private-sector partners in the endeavor.

=== Leadership areas ===
NIWC Pacific leads in the following areas:

- Command, control and communications systems
- Command, control and communications systems countermeasures
- Ocean surveillance systems
- Command, control and communications modeling and analysis
- Ocean engineering
- Navigation support
- Marine mammal operational systems
- Integration of space communications and surveillance

In addition, NIWC Pacific is involved in complementary areas of research including

- Ocean and littoral surveillance
- Microelectronics
- Communications and networking
- Ship topside design/antennas
- Command systems
- Computer technology
- Navigation and aircraft C3
- Intelligence/surveillance/reconnaissance sensors
- Atmospheric effects assessment
- Environmental quality assessment

=== Major initiatives ===
NIWC Pacific's major initiatives are:

- Enhanced Polar System (EPS)
- Enterprise Networks
- Cyber—including Cyber Security
- Mobile User Objective System (MUOS)
- C4ISR for UxVs—Autonomy
- Support to the Warfighter
- Networking on the Move
- Military Construction for (MILCON) C4I
- Unmanned Underwater Vehicles (UUV)
- Commander, Seventh Fleet (C7F)
- Consolidated Afloat Networks and Enterprise Services (CANES)

NIWC Pacific is located close to major operational commands of air, surface, submarine, and special operations Naval forces, as well as air, expeditionary, and electronic components of the U.S. Marine Corps. This support extends into the Pacific, with a SPAWAR Systems Activity in Hawaii supporting U.S. Pacific Command (PACOM) and U.S. Pacific Fleet (PACFLT), as well as facilities in Guam and Japan supporting U.S. Seventh Fleet (C7F).

=== Other activities ===
NIWC Pacific, formerly SSC Pacific, has been the host of the Association for Unmanned Vehicle Systems International annual Autonomous Underwater Vehicle competition since 2002.

== See also ==
- Naval Air Warfare Center
- Naval Surface Warfare Center
