= King's University =

King's University may refer to:

- King's University College, University of Western Ontario, a Roman Catholic college located in London, Ontario, Canada
- King's University (Canada) – formerly King's University College in Edmonton, Alberta, Canada
- King's University (Texas) – formerly The King's College and Seminary in Los Angeles, California
- King's University, Dublin, Ireland, a fictional Irish university also known as King's College Dublin
- Kings University - A private university in Odeomu area of Osun State, Nigeria

== See also ==
- King's College (disambiguation)
- King's University College (disambiguation)
