= Ernest Nzigamasabo =

Burundian basketball player

Personal information
- Born: October 27, 1969 (age 57) Bujumbura, Burundi
- Listed height: 6 ft 9 in (2.06 m)
- Listed weight: 235 lb (107 kg)

Career information
- High school: Mound (Minnetrista, Minnesota, U.S.)
- College: Minnesota (1990–1994)
- NBA draft: 1994: undrafted
- Position: Center

Career history
- 1998–1999: West Sydney Razorbacks
- 1999: Bankstown Bruins
- 2000–2001: Sydney Kings

Ernest Nzigamasabo (born October 27, 1969) is a Burundian former professional basketball player. He moved to the United States as a teenager so he could play basketball and spent his collegiate career with the Minnesota Golden Gophers. Nzigamasabo played professionally in Japan, Malaysia and Australia.

== Early life ==
Nzigamasabo was born to Salvator and Immaculee Nzigamasabo as the third eldest of their eight children. He is a Tutsi. Nzigamasabo's father worked as a freelance economics consultant and his mother worked as a government secretary. He grew up playing soccer but his tall height meant that he was converted to playing as a goalkeeper and decided to quit. Nzigamasabo started playing basketball in the seventh grade.

Nzigamasabo attended school in his hometown of Bujumbura and played basketball in a city league. He was approached by a Soviet basketball coach who wanted him to attend school in the Soviet Union. Nzigamasabo's father wanted his son to instead study in the United States so he contacted Dan Phillips, the U.S. ambassador to Burundi, and his wife, Lucie. Lucie informed Ann Maxfield, her childhood friend and former classmate at Mound High School in Minnesota, who agreed to be a guardian for Nzigamasabo. Nzigamasabo arrived in the United States as a transfer student on November 7, 1987.

Nzigamasabo enrolled at Mound High School as a junior and successfully tried out for the basketball team. He had to adjust to having a coach because none of his teams in Burundi used one. Nzigamasabo sat out most of his junior season because of State High School League eligibility rules but played in the final eight games of the season. He averaged 24 points and 10 rebounds per game during his senior season. Nzigamasabo was contacted by 100 colleges during his senior season. In April 1989, he signed a national letter of intent to play for the Minnesota Golden Gophers.

== College career ==
Nzigamasabo gained 40 pounds during his senior season at Mound and joined the Minnesota Golden Gophers with knees that ached from carrying so much weight. He was subsequently redshirted for the 1989–90 season so he could focus on improving his strength and controlling his weight. Nzigamasabo debuted for Minnesota during the 1990–91 season and took over the starting center position midway through the Big Ten Conference season. He lost the starting center position to senior Bob Martin during the 1991–92 season. Nzigamasabo averaged 3.1 points per game as a junior during the 1992–93 season. He averaged 4.3 points per game during his senior season in 1993–94.

== Professional career ==
Nzigamasabo started his professional career in Japan and then played in Malaysia. His coach in Malaysia, Australian Murray Wardle, encouraged him to try playing in Australia so Nzigamasabo played at the state level in 1997. He was noticed by Gordie McLeod who recruited him to play for the West Sydney Razorbacks in the National Basketball League (NBL) in 1998. Nzigamasabo played for the Bankstown Bruins in the Waratah League in 1999. He played for the Sydney Kings in the NBL during the 2000–01 season before he was released in January 2001.

== Personal life ==
Nzigamasabo speaks five languages including English, French, Swahili and his native Kirundi. Four of his brothers followed his path to the United States and also stayed with Maxfield.
