= École Française de Bujumbura =

Location
- Boulevard de l'Uprona, Bujumbura, Burundi
- Coordinates: 3.3817526°S 29.37330529999997°E

Information
- Website: ecole-francaise-bujumbura.com

The École Française de Bujumbura is a French international school in central Bujumbura, Burundi. It is in proximity to the Prince Rwagasore Stadium. It has maternelle (preschool), élémentaire, collège (junior high school), and lycée (senior high school/sixth-form college) sections.

As of 2015 it has 550 students ranging in age from 2–18. The students include Burundians and French but the school also has persons from other countries.

As of 2016 the school directly teaches from toute petite section ("the littlest section", for students under three years of age) until seconde (first year of lycée) and uses the National Centre for Distance Education (CNED) distance learning programme for the remaining two years, première and terminale.
