= Naval Information Warfare Systems Command =

One of the five "systems commands" of the United States Navy

Coordinates: 32°41′52.7″N 117°14′53″W

Naval Information Warfare Systems Command (NAVWAR)
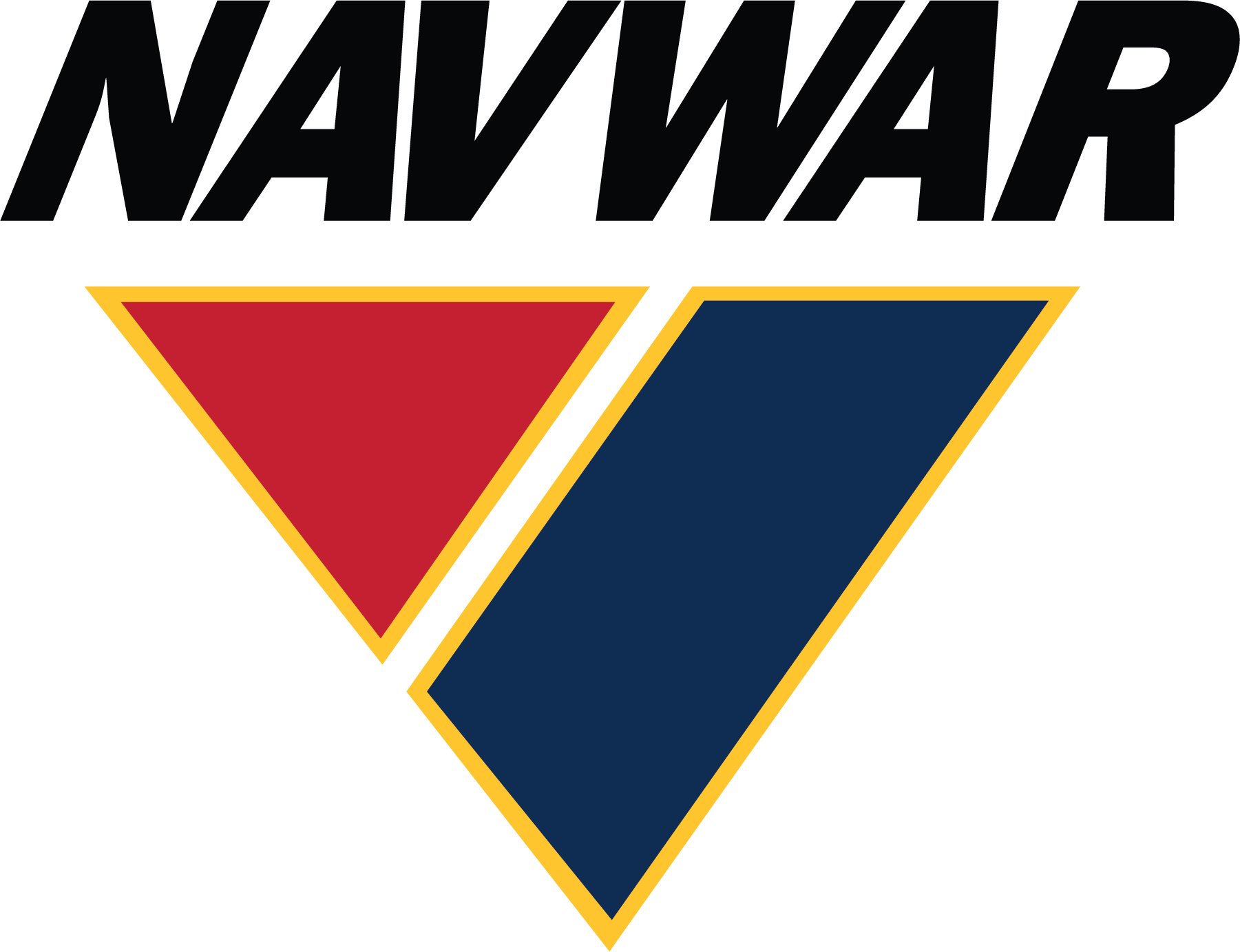
- Allegiance: United States of America
- Branch: United States Navy
- Type: SYSCOM
- Garrison/HQ: San Diego, California, U.S.

Commanders
- Commander: Rear Adm. Seiko Okano, USN
- Executive Director: John W. R. Pope III

The Naval Information Warfare Systems Command (NAVWAR), based in San Diego, California, is one of six SYSCOM Echelon II organizations within the United States Navy and is the Navy's technical authority and acquisition command for C4ISR (Command, Control, Communications, Computers, Intelligence, Surveillance and Reconnaissance), business information technology and space systems. Echelon II means that the organization reports to someone who, in turn, reports directly to the chief of naval operations on the military side. From a civilian perspective, NAVWAR reports to the assistant secretary of the Navy (RDA). The command was formerly known as Space and Naval Warfare Systems Command (SPAWAR) and was renamed in June 2019 to better align its identity with its mission.

NAVWAR supports over 150 programs managed by the Program Executive Office (PEO) for Command, Control, Communications, Computers and Intelligence (C4I), as well as the programs of PEO for Enterprise Information Systems (PEO EIS) and PEO Space Systems. These PEOs are located in the greater Washington, D.C. area. The Naval Information Warfare Center (NIWC) Atlantic is located in Charleston, South Carolina, and also includes facilities in Norfolk, Virginia, New Orleans and Stuttgart, Germany. NIWC Pacific is located in San Diego, and includes facilities in Japan, Guam and Hawaii. Effective February 18, 2019, the names of the systems centers changed to Naval Information Warfare Center Atlantic and Pacific.

== History ==
A number of mergers over the years have led to the current organization. Eighty percent of the Point Loma Military Reservation evolved into the Naval Electronics Laboratory Center (NELC) at the end of World War II. In the 1960s, NELC was tasked with 4C: Command, Control, Communications and Computers. In 1977 NELC was merged into the Naval Ocean Systems Center (NOSC) and eventually was merged into SPAWAR (now NAVWAR).

The Naval Command, Control and Ocean Surveillance Center (NCCOSC) was SPAWAR's warfare center for command, control, communications, and ocean surveillance. NCCOSC's mission, as part of SPAWAR, was to develop, acquire, and support systems for information transfer and management to provide U.S. naval forces a decisive warfare advantage, and to be the Navy's center for research, development, test and evaluation, engineering, and fleet support for command, control, communications, and ocean surveillance systems.

A BRAC '95 decision relocated SPAWAR from Crystal City, Virginia, to San Diego to collocate it with its RDT&E and engineering organizations. The command was established at the Old Town Campus in San Diego on October 1, 1997.

During the war in Afghanistan, NAVWAR was responsible for managing air traffic control contractors in Afghanistan, including the Kabul en route air traffic control center, the Kabul, Kandahar, and Bagram approach control radar facilities, and respective control towers.

In June 2019, the Space and Naval Warfare Systems Command was renamed the Naval Information Warfare Systems Command.

== Site redevelopment ==
In May 2021, the US Navy released an exposure draft of a proposal to re-develop the roughly 70 acres (28 hectares) NAVWAR site, to consist of:

- 19,600,000 square feet (1,820,000 m^{2}) of total development, of which:
  - 1,700,000 square feet (160,000 m^{2}) for all-new Navy cybersecurity buildings and employee parking spots, with that portion to be built by a private partner within the first five years;
  - the remaining approximately 17,900,000 square feet (1,660,000 m^{2}) for a mixed-use development in buildings up to 350 foot (110 m) tall. Possible concepts could include:
    - 10,000 units (and 14,400 parking stalls) for a neighborhood population of over 14,000 people,
    - 1,300,000 square feet (120,000 m^{2}) of commercial office space,
    - 250,000 square feet (23,000 m^{2}) of mostly ground-level stores,
    - a 140,000 square feet (13,000 m^{2}) transit center with 500 parking spots,
    - two hotels offering a total of 450 rooms, and
    - a 400-megawatt data center, though this specific proposal resulted in a 45-day moratorium on data centers in San Diego, which doesn't cover the NAVWAR site.

The Manchester Group won the contract for redevelopment.

== Responsibilities ==
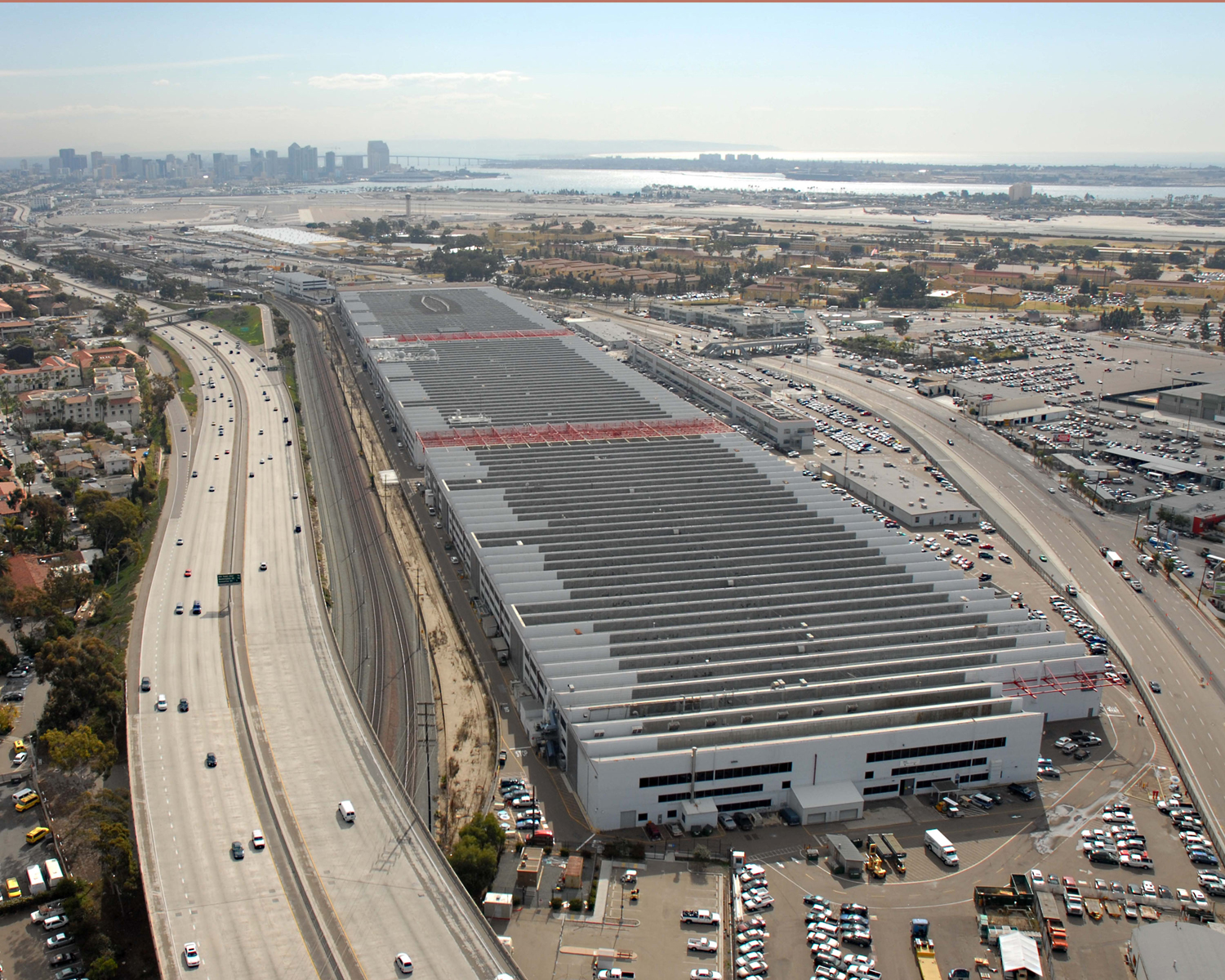
Aerial view of the NAVWARSYSCOM Headquarters in San Diego, California

NAVWAR designs and develops communications and information systems. They employ over 11,000 professionals located around the world and close to the United States Navy fleet.

NAVWAR provides systems engineering and technical support for the development and maintenance of C4ISR (command, control, communications, computers, intelligence, surveillance and reconnaissance), business information technology and space capabilities. These are used in ships, aircraft and vehicles to connect individual platforms into integrated systems for the purpose of information sharing among Navy, Marine, joint forces, federal agencies and international allies.

- Command and Control: to organize, direct, coordinate, deploy and control forces to accomplish assigned missions
- Responsible for managing Air Traffic Control contractors in the Afghanistan theater of operations. Includes the Kabul en route air traffic control center, Kabul, Kandahar, and Bagram approach control radar facilities, as well as control towers at all three locations.
- Intelligence, Surveillance, Reconnaissance and Information Operations: to collect, process, exploit and disseminate information regarding an adversary's capability and intent
- Cyberspace Operations: to operate and protect communications and networks, while exploiting and disrupting adversary's command and control
- Business Information Technology (IT) and Enterprise Information Systems: to enable business processes and to ensure standard IT capabilities
- Enterprise Systems Engineering: to develop solutions based on capability needs, design considerations and constraints
- Space Systems: to procure and manage narrowband communication satellites in support of the Department of Defense and other government agencies
- Communications and Networks: to provide information through voice, video and data

== Program Executive Offices (PEO) ==
NAVWAR's three affiliated Program Executive Offices (PEOs) are responsible for the prototyping, procurement, and fielding of C4ISR (Command, Control, Communications, Computers, Intelligence, Surveillance and Reconnaissance), business information technology and space systems. Their mission is to develop, acquire, field and sustain affordable and integrated state of the art equipment for the Navy.

PEOs report to the NAVWAR commander for planning and execution of in-service support, and to the Assistant Secretary of the Navy (Research, Development and Acquisition) for acquisition-related matters.

The NAVWAR-affiliated PEOs are:

- Program Executive Office Command, Control, Communications, Computers and Intelligence (PEO C4I) and Space Systems
- Program Executive Office for Digital and Enterprise Services (PEO Digital)
- Program Executive Office Manpower, Logistics and Business Solutions (PEO MLB)

== See also ==
- Naval Information Warfare Center Pacific
- Naval Information Warfare Center Atlantic
- NAVWAR Space Field Activity

U.S. Armed Forces systems commands

- Army Materiel Command
- Marine Corps Systems Command
- United States Navy systems commands
  - Naval Sea Systems Command
  - Naval Air Systems Command
  - Naval Facilities Engineering Systems Command
  - Naval Supply Systems Command
- Air Force Materiel Command
- Space Systems Command
