= Leonard Tangishaka =

Burundian basketball player

Personal information
- Born: c. 1970 (age 55–56) Bujumbura, Burundi
- Listed height: 6 ft 11 in (2.11 m)

Career information
- College: Mount Ida JC (1993–1995); Buffalo (1995–1997)
- NBA draft: 1997: undrafted
- Position: Center

Leonard Tangishaka (born c. 1970) is a Burundian former basketball player. Raised in Bujumbura, he was noticed by an American scout at a local clinic as a high school student and offered a scholarship to attend Mount Ida Junior College in 1993. Tangishaka transferred to play for the Buffalo Bulls from 1995 to 1997. He played for the Burundi national basketball team.

== Early life ==
Tangishaka was raised in Bujumbura, Burundi, as the oldest of seven children to his father, Epitac, and mother, Heaen. He is a Tutsi. His father worked as a salesman in a market. Two of Tangishaka's uncles studied in Europe when he was a child and he desired to study overseas. He played soccer and ran cross country while he was growing up. Tangishaka was encouraged to play basketball by two uncles who also played. He was selected as the most valuable player of his amateur team and led his high school team to two league championships.

In 1990, American basketball coach Rick Boyages went to Burundi to run clinics for the Institute of International Sport. He used the opportunity to scout local talent and discovered a 20-year-old Tangishaka who "was younger, brighter and more physically gifted than the others." Tangishaka had attended the clinics by running 10 miles up a mountain barefoot. Boyages told Tangishaka that he had the talent to play at a college in the United States but had to wait until after his high school graduation. Tangishaka graduated at the age of 21 which was standard in Burundi.

In 1993, Boyages contacted Tangishaka with the opportunity to attend Mount Ida Junior College in Massachusetts. Tangishaka accepted the offer and moved to the United States in June 1993. Tangishaka was met by Mount Ida coach, Rico Cabral, at the airport and collapsed into his arms with emotion after completing the journey.

== College career ==
Tangishaka led the Mount Ida basketball team to a 30–2 record during the 1994–95 season. He was selected as the New England Junior College Player of the Year. Tangishaka graduated from Mount Ida with a degree in individualized studies in 1995. He was able to continue his education on an NCAA Division I scholarship; he received interest from several schools including the University of Wisconsin–Madison and Boston College. Tangishaka was encouraged by Boyages to join the University at Buffalo because Boyages knew team head coach Tim Cohane and the university had a good international business program which was Tangishaka's desired field of study. Tangishaka was signed by Buffalo in May 1995.

With the Buffalo Bulls, Tangishaka was a disruptive force on defense but proved to be a liability on offence due to the physicality from his opponents. Tangishaka was easily maneuvered off the low post due to his light weight and lack of long-term strength training. He was used as a starter during his first season with the Bulls. Tangishaka's playing time was reduced during his senior season as Cohane elected to utilise a smaller line-up. He graduated from the University of Buffalo with an undergraduate degree in business.

Tangishaka was inducted into the Mount Ida College Athletic Hall of Fame in 2001.

== National team career ==
Tangishaka played for the Burundi national basketball team.

== Personal life ==
In October 1993, ethnic violence broke out in Burundi and Tangishaka had friends who were killed. He was distressed by the news and considered himself fortunate to be away. Tangishaka's family escaped the violence unscathed.

Tangishaka speaks French, Swahili, English and his native tribal dialect.

Tangishaka's son, Lenny, plays college basketball for the Assumption Greyhounds.
