= Kings Bay =

Kings Bay may refer to:

Svalbard, Norway

- Kongsfjorden, a fjord previously known as Kings Bay
- Ny-Ålesund, a town known as Kings Bay until 1925
- Kings Bay (company), a Norwegian government enterprise that runs the Ny-Ålesund research facility
- Kings Bay Affair, the political aftermath of a mining accident which caused a cabinet to resign

United States

- Kings Bay Base, Georgia, a census-designated place in Camden County, Georgia
- Kings Bay (Florida), a bay on Crystal River (Florida)
- Kings Bay (Georgia), a bay in Georgia
- Naval Submarine Base Kings Bay, a United States Navy base in Camden County, in southeast Georgia
