= King College =

King College may refer to:

- King College of Technology, Namakkal, Tamil Nadu, India
- King University, formerly King College, Bristol, Tennessee, United States

== See also ==
- Kennedy–King College, Chicago
- King College Prep, high school in Chicago
- King's College (disambiguation)
