= The King's Academy =

The King's Academy may refer to:

== U.S. schools ==
- The King's Academy (California), Sunnyvale, California
- The King's Academy (Florida), West Palm Beach, Florida
- The King's Academy (Tennessee), Seymour, Tennessee
- The Kings Academy (Indiana), Jonesboro, Indiana

== Other locations ==
- The King's Academy, Middlesbrough, England, UK
- King's Academy Prospect, Reading, England, UK
- The King's Church of England Academy, Staffordshire, England, UK
- King's Academy, Madaba, Jordan

== See also ==
- King's Leadership Academy (disambiguation)
- King's College (disambiguation), various colleges
- King's School (disambiguation), various schools
