= Baptist Union of Burundi =

Baptist Christian denomination in Burundi

- Union des Églises baptistes du Burundi
- Classification: Evangelical Christianity
- Theology: Baptist
- Associations: Baptist World Alliance
- Headquarters: Bujumbura, Burundi
- Origin: 1962; 64 years ago
- Congregations: 230
- Members: 52,000
- Official website: bucburundi.org

The Baptist Union of Burundi (French: Union des Églises baptistes du Burundi) is a Baptist Christian denomination in Burundi. It is affiliated with the Baptist World Alliance. The headquarters is in Bujumbura.

== History ==
The Union has its origins in a Baptist mission of Baptist Union of Denmark in 1928. In 1962, it was founded under the name of Union of Baptist Churches in Burundi. According to a census published by the association in 2023, it claimed 230 churches and 52,000 members.
