= King's Leadership Academy =

King's Leadership Academy may refer to:

- King's Leadership Academy Hawthornes, a secondary school in Bootle, Merseyside, England
- King's Leadership Academy Liverpool, a secondary school in Liverpool, Merseyside, England
- King's Leadership Academy Warrington, a secondary school in Warrington, Cheshire, England

== See also ==
- The King's Academy (disambiguation)
