= Kings Family Restaurants =

Restaurant chain serving American cuisine

- Industry: Restaurant (food service), Food processing, Food retailing
- Founded: North Versailles, Pennsylvania (1967)
- Number of locations: 2
- Key people: Hartley C. King, Founder and President
- Products: Kings Family Restaurants, Hartley's Choice pies and ice cream
- Number of employees: unknown
- Website: kingsfamily.com

Kings Family Restaurants is a chain of family restaurants historically located throughout southwestern Pennsylvania. As of January 2026, the company operates two locations.

Kings logo has scarlet colored lettering, with a saffron outline.

== History ==
Kings was founded in 1967, when Hartley King purchased a restaurant called the "Pig-N-Go" in North Versailles, Pennsylvania and renamed it to "Kings Country Shoppes." He later changed the name to Kings Family Restaurants to more clearly indicate what kind of business it was. By 1980 the number of restaurants had grown to 7, and 24 by 1990. By 2006, there were 34 locations throughout Pennsylvania and one in Wintersville, Ohio.

Kings donated to many charity organizations, including the Veterans Leadership Program and the Make-A-Wish Foundation of Western Pennsylvania.

In July 2009, Kings Restaurants launched a new restaurant concept called Kings Hometown Grille. It featured a different design and layout, as well as a different menu from most other Kings locations. Unlike any other locations in the chain, Kings Hometown Grille also offered alcoholic beverages, including beer, wine and cocktails. All of these locations have since closed.

In 2015, Kelly Capital purchased the Kings Family Restaurants, after founder Hartley King announced his retirement. On March 26, 2017, it was announced that five of its earliest stores: Wexford, Bridgeville, Imperial, Harmarville, and Altoona restaurants would be shutting down at 7 p.m. that evening. Approximately 130 employees were given no notice, and were left jobless.

On January 31, 2025, Hartley King died at age 91.

In April 2025, the Kings restaurant in Canonsburg, Pennsylvania abruptly closed, leaving the chain with just three locations. Later that year, the Kings location in Hempfield also closed, leaving just two remaining locations in Franklin and Kittanning.

== Fare ==
Kings serves American cuisine, including sandwiches, salads, and burgers. The restaurant also serves ice cream and milkshakes. Kings is also famous for their Frownie Brownies, although the Frownie Brownie was discontinued with the chain's purchase by Kelly Capital, which prompted outrage from diners. The Frownie returned to the Menu in March 2019.

== Smoking ==
Kings maintained smoking sections in most of its restaurants until a statewide smoking ban was enacted in Pennsylvania in September 2008.
