= École Belge Burundi =

Location
- Boulevard du Japon nº36 B.P 591 Bujumbura Burundi (former: Boulevard de Yaranda, Bujumbura, Burundi)
- Coordinates: 3.393879°S 29.360155°E

Information
- Website: ecolebelge.edu.bi

École Belge Burundi (EBB) formerly École Belge de Bujumbura is a Belgian international school in Bujumbura, Burundi. It serves students ages 3–18, in maternelle (preschool) through secondaire (secondary school). The school supports both Francophone and Dutch-speaking students. It is a part of the Association des écoles à programme belge à l'étranger (AEBE).

== History ==
The school opened in September 1965 and the Burundian government recognised the school through a ministerial decree passed on 3 July 1969. The school reopened in 1996 despite an embargo put on the Burundian government.

== Student body ==
As of 15 October 2014, the school had 509 students. This was an increase from its October 1996 figure, 233 students.
