= King's School (Burundi) =

Coordinates: 3.4015°S 29.3563°E

- Bujumbura; Burundi

Information
- Religious affiliation: Christian
- Established: 1998; 28 years ago
- Founder: Chrissie Chapman
- Age: 18 months to 18 years
- Language: English
- Website: https://thekingsschool.edu.bi/

The King's School is a Christian, English-language international school in Bujumbura, Burundi. Operated under African Revival Ministries, it serves children 18 months to 18 years of age and uses a British curriculum.

== History ==
Chrissie Chapman established a school in Kinindo in 1998, with a British woman serving as the school's teacher; the living room of the teacher's residence served as the classroom. The school stated that in 1997 God asked her to start a school. Chapman, at the time of starting the school, was caring for nine orphans, and they became students at the school. Originally the school only had these orphans as students.

In June 1998, Chapman asked the owner of a building to rent it for her school; the school moved to this building after renovations occurred and the school used this building by September 1998. Donors from the C.R.I.B. purchased this building. The school had 13 students in September 1998.

In September 1999, the school opened to the general public. The Burundian government had given authorization to the school the previous Easter Sunday.

The student body doubled in size to around 70 from 35 by June 2000, the end of the school's first official school year. The secondary school began operations in September 2001. The first IGCSE class graduated in June 2005. An A-level programme opened in September 2011.

== Teaching staff ==
In 1999, the school had a Burundian teacher who taught French and Kirundi, while the other three teachers were non-Burundians.
