= King's Variety Store =

American discount store chain

- Type: Discount store
- Industry: Retail
- Founded: 1915
- Defunct: 2017
- Headquarters: Burley, Idaho
- Number of locations: 27 (2017)
- Products: toys, hardware, housewares, clothing, domestics, electronics, seasonal merchandise, craft supplies, furniture, gift wear

King's Variety Store was a chain of discount stores founded in 1915 by M.H. King in Burley, Idaho. At its peak, King's had 27 stores in Idaho, Montana, Nevada, Oregon, Utah, and Wyoming.

A typical King's store ranged from 10,000 square feet (930 m^{2}) to 20,000 square feet (1,900 m^{2}) and carried a wide variety of value priced merchandise. Most King's stores were located in smaller towns that only had a grocery store as its major retail store.

In February 2017, King's announced it would close all of its stores, and ceased operations that May.
