= King's School, Witney =

The King's School

Location
- New Yatt Road; Witney, Oxfordshire, OX29 6TA; England
- Coordinates: 51.798756°N 1.472468°W

Information
- Type: Independent
- Religious affiliation: Christian
- Established: 1984
- Founder: Oxfordshire Community Churches
- Local authority: Oxfordshire
- Chairman of Governors: Alastair Barnett
- Principal: Lynne Weber
- Gender: Co-educational
- Age: 3 to 16
- Enrolment: 210 approx.
- Colours: Blue, Black White
- Website: http://www.tkswitney.org.uk/

The King's School is a co-educational independent Christian school in Witney, Oxfordshire, England that is part of Oxfordshire Community Churches (OCC). The school had 163 pupils at the time of its last Full Inspection and now has over 210 pupils from ages 3–16 years. The ISI inspection in Dec 2018 found the school fully compliant with all regulations. It has maintained the level of fees due to the support of the Oxfordshire Community Churches.

== History ==
The King's School was started in 1984 by the OCC group of churches with David Freeman as the founding principal. The school had several locations between 1984 and 1989. The school was first based at Merrifield house then it moved to Scout Houses and even spent some time based at the Cotswold Wildlife Park before a purpose built facility was provided by the churches, which includes a large sports hall. The School is on New Yatt Road, Witney.

In its early years (throughout the 1980s and beyond) the school used Accelerated Christian Education (ACE), a right-wing conservative evangelical syllabus from America. This material taught against evolution and in favour of racial segregation (including apartheid). The school no longer uses that material and now follows the national curriculum, with Christian teaching woven into all subjects. Christ is at the heart of the school and the values are being Christian in curriculum, character and community.

== Extracurricular activities ==
Among the extracurricular activities at the school are frequent Sports events, theatrical productions and educational visits and the Enrichment Week. The school supports local and national charities, raising over £1,500 for charities in 2022-23.

To help the students with learning languages and to experience other cultures the school provides trips to both Germany and France, along with the Year 11 trip, which can be to other parts of the world, including Zambia.
