= Kings County =

Kings County or King's County may refer to:

== Places ==
=== Canada ===
- Kings County, New Brunswick
- Kings County, Nova Scotia
- Kings County, Prince Edward Island
  - King's County (electoral district), abolished in 1892

=== Ireland ===
- County Offaly, formerly called King's County
  - King's County (Parliament of Ireland constituency)
  - King's County (UK Parliament constituency)

=== United States ===
- Kings County, California
- Kings County, New York, coextensive with Brooklyn
- Washington County, Rhode Island, called King's County until 1781

== Ships ==
- Kings County (barque), a large sailing vessel named after Kings County, Nova Scotia

== See also ==
- King County (disambiguation)
