= United States Navy Working Capital Fund =

Branch of the family of United States Department of Defense (DoD) Working Capital Funds

The United States Navy Working Capital Fund (NWCF) is a branch of the family of United States Department of Defense (DoD) Working Capital Funds. The NWCF is a revolving fund, an account or fund that relies on sales revenue rather than direct Congressional appropriations to finance its operations. It is intended to generate adequate revenue to cover the full costs of its operations, and to finance the fund's continuing operations without fiscal year limitation. A revolving fund is intended to operate on a break-even basis over time; that is, it neither makes a profit nor incurs a loss.

United States Navy activities financed through the NWCF perform a wide variety of functions including Supply Management, Depot Maintenance, Research and Development, Transportation, and Base Support. The NWCF continues to pursue some important efforts to improve efficiency and maximize effectiveness. Success in these endeavors is critical to ensuring that the Department of the Navy can afford both the ongoing support costs of fleet operations and the necessary reinvestment in new platforms and weapons systems.

== History of the NWCF ==
Historically, the U.S. military has had two categories of revolving funds; stock funds and industrial funds.

Stock funds, in use by the Navy since the 1870s, were aimed at financing the procurement of material (spare parts and other items) in volume from commercial sources, to be held in inventory. This material was intended to be sold to customers, in order to achieve weapon systems readiness or to provide personnel support. Industrial funds, in use by the Navy since the 1940s, provided industrial and commercial goods and services such as depot maintenance, transportation, and research and development. The 1949 amendments to the National Security Act of 1947 authorized the United States secretary of defense to establish revolving funds as the business model for the operation of these funds.

In 1991, all of DoD's stock and industrial funds were rolled into a single revolving fund, the Defense Business Operations Fund (DBOF), along with five additional defense commercial operations or business areas previously funded with direct appropriations. DBOF was capitalized at a level significantly less than the sum of the stock and industrial funds it replaced. The consolidation of stock and industrial funds caused overall cash levels to be reduced, by allowing funds or capital to be shared across all of the activities, resulting in cash flow problems. The Defense Authorization Act addressed this issue, requiring that DoD conduct a comprehensive study of DBOF and present its findings along with a proposed improvement plan to Congress for approval.

In December 1996, DBOF was reorganized into four working capital funds (Army, Navy, Air Force, and Defense-Wide). With the addition of a fifth fund—the Defense Commissary Agency in 1999—the new organization was now officially called the Defense Working Capital Fund (DWCF). The five funds and their corresponding business areas provide goods and services to DoD and authorized non-DoD activities.

== DWCF and NWCF operations ==
The support functions financed through the NWCF, as part of the DWCF, are grouped together at the DWCF level into business areas that are managed within DoD. Business areas receive their initial working capital through an appropriation or transfer of resources from an existing revolving fund. This working capital is called the "corpus" and is used to finance the initial costs of goods and services. Resources to replenish the corpus are generated by acceptance of customer orders. Customer orders are obligations on the appropriations of the ordering activity. The business area delivers the goods or services ordered using the funds in the corpus, and then bills the customer based on the rates set for those goods and services. The fund is replenished when the customer pays the bill to the fund.

Customer orders accepted by the NWCF activities must be either obligations of a federal government activity or cash advances from non-federal government customers. The acceptance of a customer order creates a quasi-contractual relationship between the NWCF activity and its customer. The customers of each NWCF activity are responsible for budgeting for and budgetary control of the cost of end products and services ordered from the NWCF activity. The customer cannot use its appropriated funds to do indirectly (through the NWCF activity) what it is not permitted to do directly. The availability of an appropriation cannot be expanded or otherwise changed by transfer to the NWCF. The customer bears the primary responsibility for the determination of the applicability of its appropriated funds in the orders placed with the NWCF activity.

=== Stabilized billing rates ===
One of the features of the NWCF that allows its customers to accurately plan and budget their appropriated funds for NWCF support requirements is the rate stabilization policy adopted by the NWCF. For each budget year, the NWCF establishes customer rates on an end product basis whenever feasible. These rates are set at levels estimated to recover the cost of products or services to be provided. This stabilized rate policy protects appropriated fund customers from unforeseen cost changes, and also minimizes fluctuations in planned NWCF work levels, permitting a more effective use of NWCF resources.

In conjunction with the stabilized rate policy, the NWCF uses a cost recovery, or breakeven policy. With stabilized rates, gains or losses in operations may occur as a result of variations in program execution. To maintain full cost recovery and thereby to break even over the long term, NWCF activities generally adjust their rates each year to reflect such realized gains and losses.

== NWCF requirements ==
To be included in the NWCF financial structure, a proposed business area must meet four criteria:

1. Outputs (i.e., goods produced and services provided) can be identified;
2. An approved accounting system is available;
3. Organizations (i.e., customers) that require and order products or services have been identified;
4. Advantages and disadvantages of establishing a buyer/seller relationship have been evaluated.

== Revolving funds ==
The funding of the NWCF is based on a revolving-fund concept of operations, under which the NWCF activities received their initial working capital through an appropriation or through a transfer of resources from existing appropriations of funds and used those resources to finance the initial cost of products and services. Financial resources to replenish the initial working capital and to permit continuing operations are generated by the acceptance of customer orders.

Revolving funds operate in a fashion similar to a personal checking account. An individual deposits income into their account. In order to maintain themselves as a "continuing operation," necessary goods and services must be purchased, reducing the fund total. In order to keep the fund balanced, expenditures must not exceed income. By keeping a positive account balance, and by looking for ways to stretch capital further, revolving fund activities are exercising sound financial management.

A revolving fund gets its name from the cyclic nature of the cash flow. Income from customer purchases is used to finance a service providers' continuing operations, i.e., the business areas in a working capital fund sell goods or services with the intent of recovering the total cost incurred in providing those goods and services. Income from sales is then used to buy or replace inventory and finance the production of future goods and services.

== NWCF funding process summary ==
1. Congress provides a one-time cash corpus to begin operation and in advance of customer orders.
2. Customers receive appropriations from Congress.
3. The customer sends a work order or project order to the working capital fund business area provider.
4. The business area furnishes the service or product, pays for expenses incurred, and bills the customer.
5. The customer pays the bill.
6. The business area incurs either a loss or a profit during the fiscal year, resulting in either an increase in the rate charged to the customer or a rebate (lowered rate) charged to the customer.
