= King County (disambiguation) =

King County is a county in Washington State that includes the city of Seattle.

King County may also refer to:

== Places ==
- King County, Texas, United States
- King County, New South Wales, Australia

== Ship ==
- King County (steam ferry), which operated on Lake Washington, Washington, United States, from 1900 to 1907 or 1908

== See also ==
- Kings County (disambiguation)
- King Country, a region of New Zealand
