= NAVWAR Space Field Activity =

Echelon III activity of the United States Navy

Coordinates: 38°52′55″N 77°27′01″W

NAVWAR Space Field Activity (NSFA)
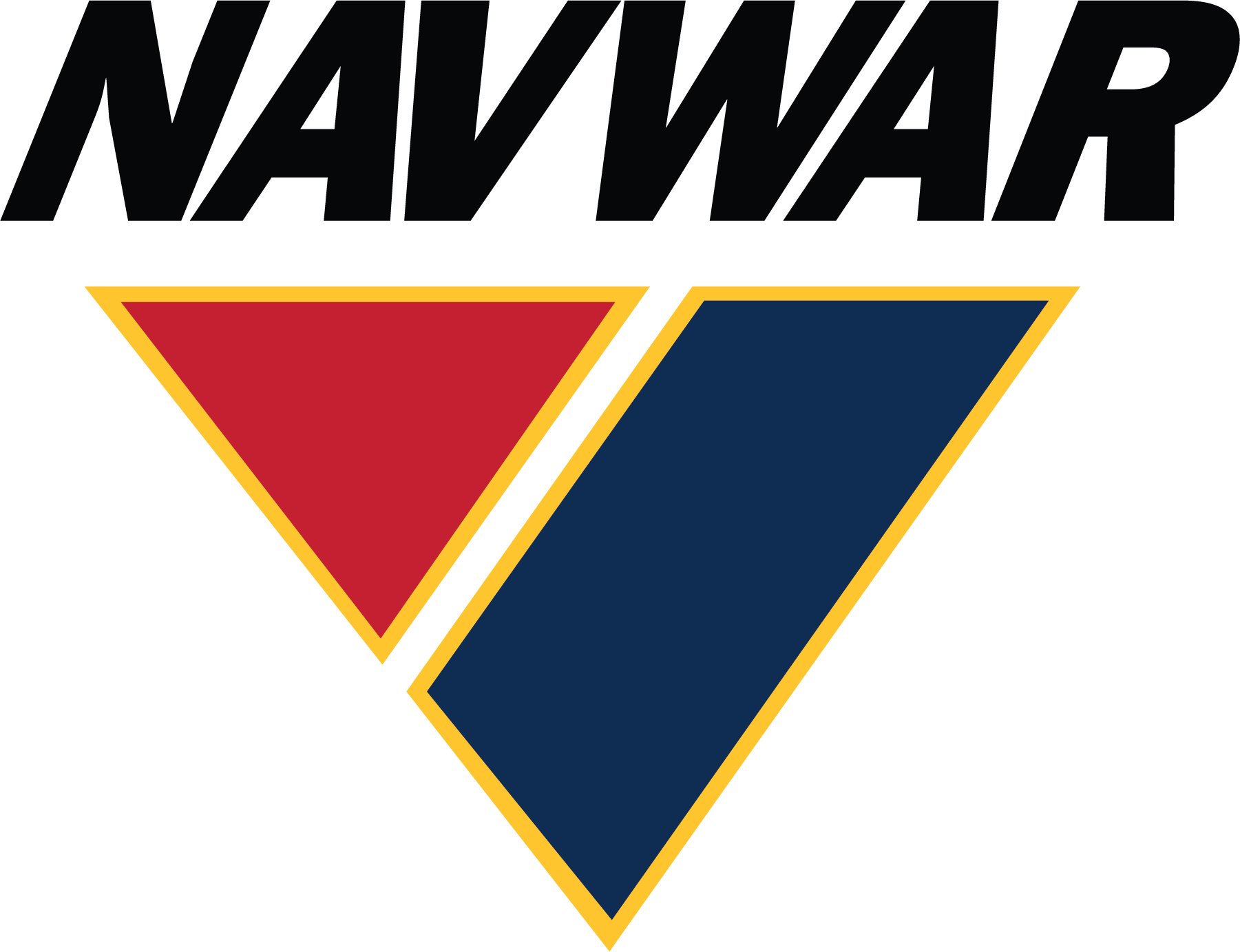
- Allegiance: United States of America
- Branch: United States Navy
- Part of: Naval Information Warfare Systems Command
- Garrison/HQ: Chantilly, Virginia, U.S.

Commanders
- Commanding Officer: CAPT Andy "Big Tuna" Berner, USN
- Executive Director: LCDR Steven Hood, USN
- Senior Enlisted Leader: SCPO Elizabeth Ornelas-Flowers, USN

The NAVWAR Space Field Activity (NSFA) is one of three Echelon III activities under the Naval Information Warfare Systems Command (NAVWARSYSCOM) of the United States Navy, co-located with the National Reconnaissance Office (NRO) in Chantilly, Virginia.

The activity was established to coordinate naval space and warfare systems activities within the National Reconnaissance Office. NSFA personnel provide naval warfare and acquisition expertise to national reconnaissance programs, coordinate naval space research, development, and acquisition activities with those same national reconnaissance programs, and provide and coordinate training and tools to enable the fleet to use national space capabilities.
