= King's University College =

King's University College may refer to:

- King's University College (Edmonton)
- King's University College (University of Western Ontario)
- King's University College, Accra, Ghana; see List of universities in Ghana
- University of King's College, Halifax, Nova Scotia

== See also ==
- King's College (disambiguation)
