= King's College =

King's College or The King's College often refers to three education institutions.

- King's College, Cambridge, a constituent of the University of Cambridge
- King's College London, a constituent of the University of London
- King's College School, Soto de Viñuelas, a group of British international schools

King's College or The King's College may also refer to:

== Australia ==
- King's College, University of Queensland, in St Lucia, Brisbane
- King's College, Warrnambool, an independent coeducational Presbyterian school
- King's College, a former school now incorporated into Pembroke School, Adelaide

== Canada ==
- University of King's College, in Halifax, Nova Scotia
- King's University College, University of Western Ontario, in London, Ontario
- King's University (Edmonton), formerly King's University College
- King's College, the predecessor institution to the University of New Brunswick
- King's College, the predecessor institution to the University of Toronto

== United Kingdom ==
- King's College, Aberdeen, the oldest part of the University of Aberdeen
- King's College School, Cambridge, a preparatory school linked to King's College, Cambridge
- King's College, Guildford, an International Baccalaureate school
- King's College, Newcastle, a former college of Durham University, which left to form Newcastle University
- King's College, Taunton, a private boarding secondary school in Taunton, Somerset
- King's College Hospital, a hospital in the Borough of Southwark, London
- King's College School, Wimbledon, London, a leading Eton Group school founded by King George IV linked to King's College London

== United States ==
- King's College, the colonial-era name of Columbia College, part of Columbia University, in New York City, New York
- King's College (Charlotte, North Carolina), a former private, for-profit college in Charlotte, North Carolina
- King's College (Pennsylvania) in Wilkes-Barre, Pennsylvania
- King's College (New York City), a former Christian liberal arts college in New York City
- The King's University (Texas) in Southlake, Texas

== Other locations ==
- King's College, Auckland, New Zealand
- King's College Budo, in Wakiso district, Uganda
- King's College, Hong Kong, a secondary school in Hong Kong
- King's College, Kathmandu, Nepal
- King's College, Lagos, Nigeria
- King's College, Madrid, Spain
- King's College, Panama, a British international school
- King's College, Doha, Qatar (sister of King's College Taunton)

== See also ==
- Kings International College, a secondary school in Camberley, Surrey
- Oriel College, Oxford, known as King's College from about 1326 to 1526
- Eton College, founded in 1440 by King Henry VI as "The King's College of Our Lady of Eton besides Wyndsor"
- King's School (disambiguation)
- Kings (disambiguation)
- King College (disambiguation)
- King's University College (disambiguation)
- King's University (disambiguation)
