= Bujumbura =

Largest city of Burundi

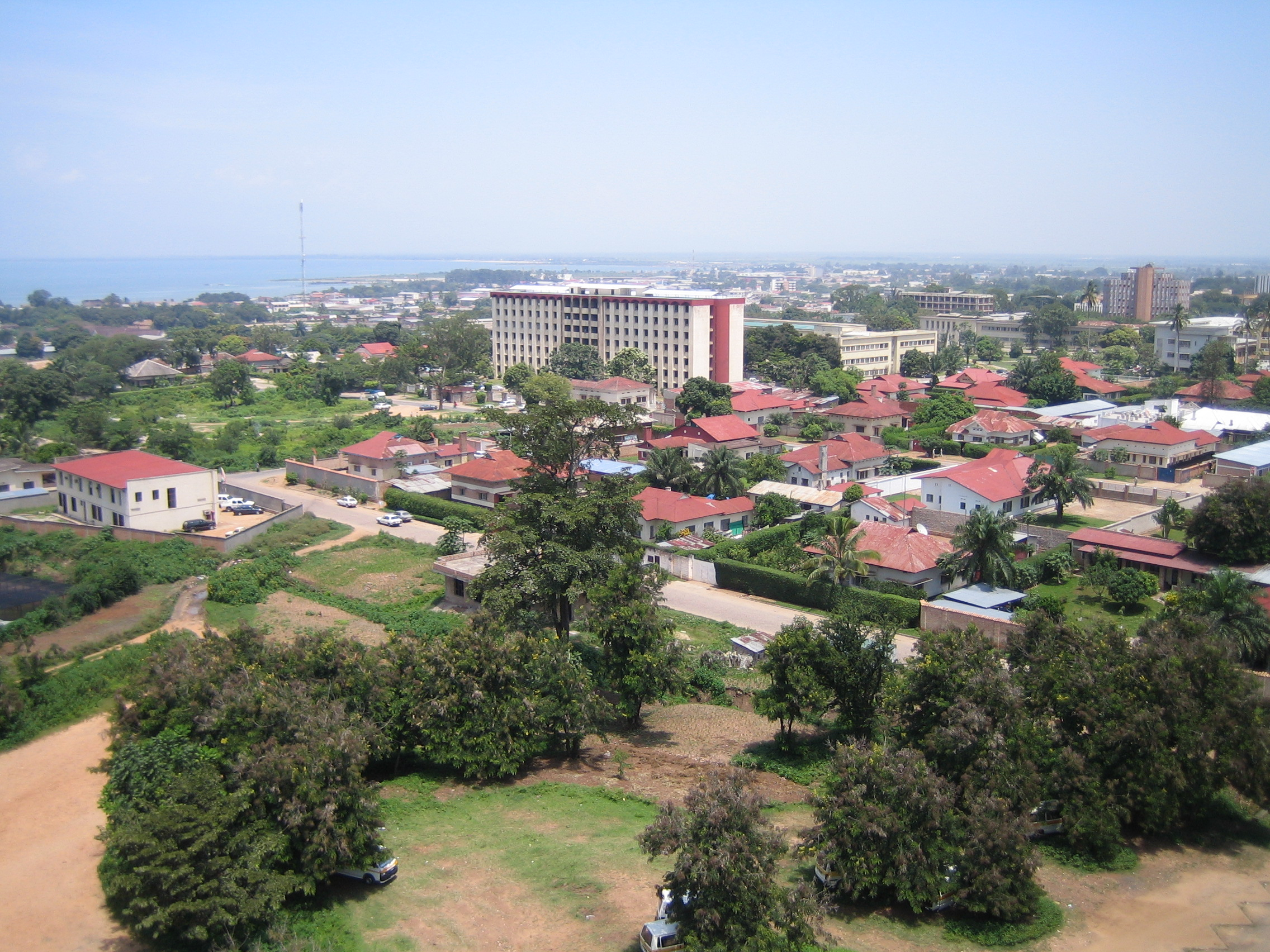
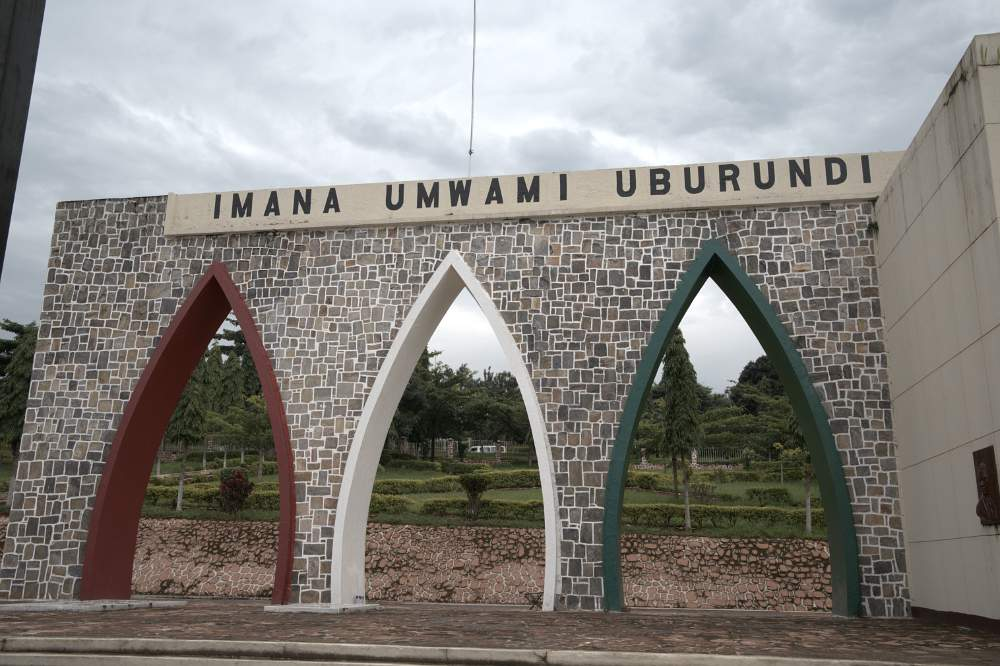
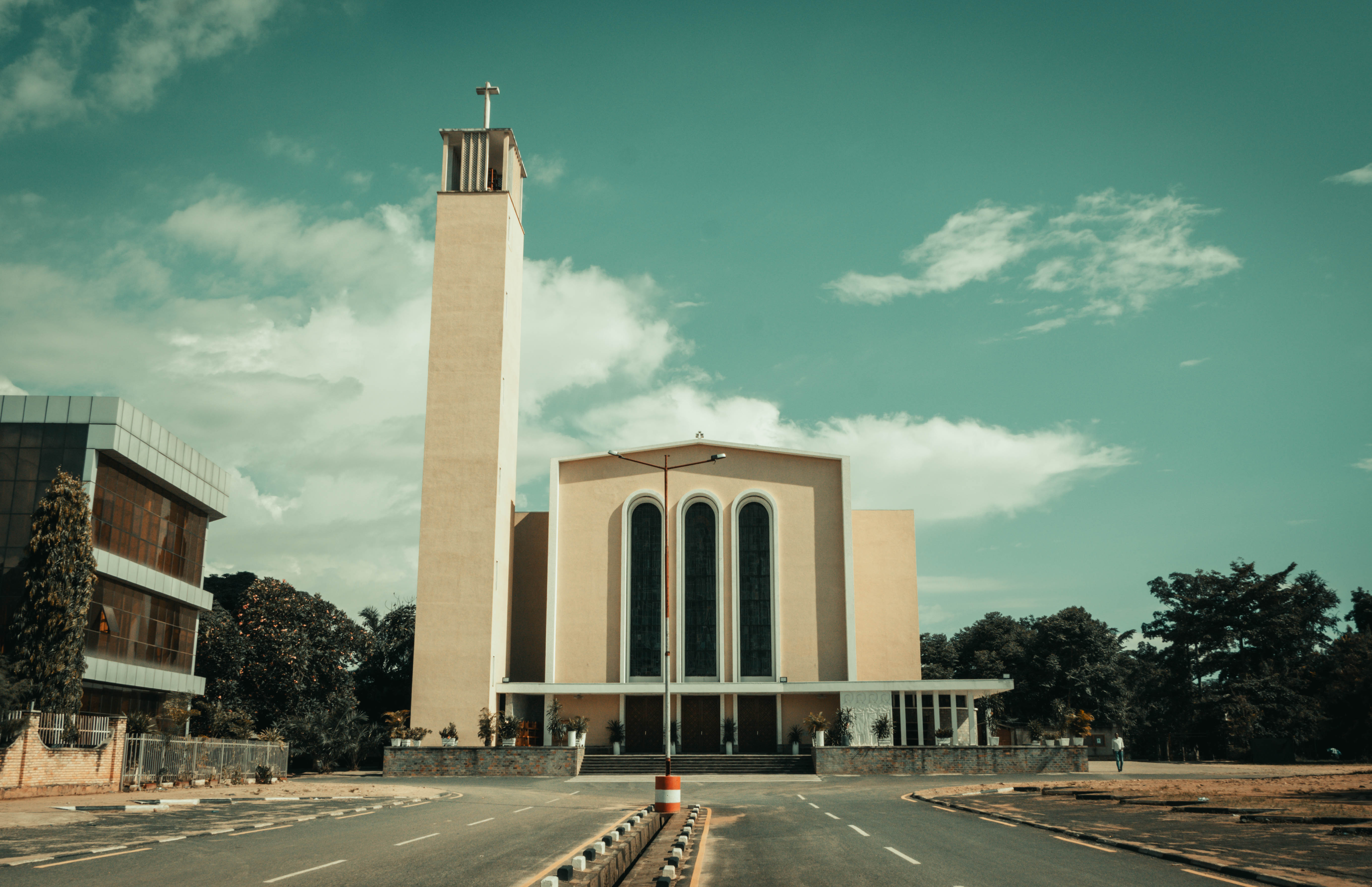
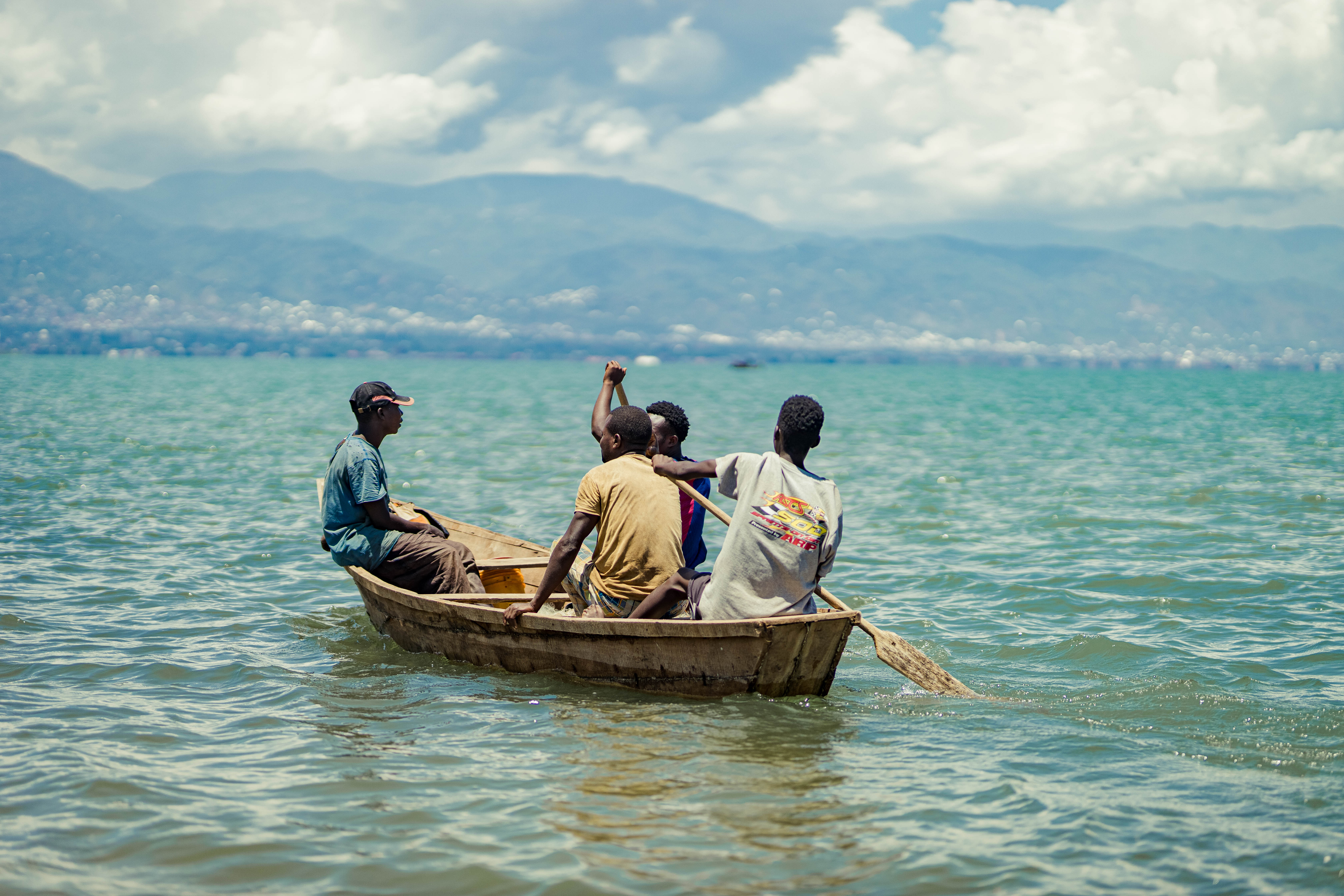
- Top, counterclockwise to the left: Bujumbura skyline, Monument to Independence Heroes, Regina Mundi Cathedral, Lake Tanganyika
- Nicknames: /ˌbʊdʒəmˈbʊrə/, /ˌbʊˈdʒʊmbʊrə/
- Interactive map of Bujumbura
- Location within Burundi
- Coordinates: 3°21′46″S 29°21′56″E
- Country: Burundi
- Province: Bujumbura Province
- Founded: 1871

Government
  - Governor: Aloys Ndayikengurukiye

Area
  - Urban: 127 km^{2} (49 sq mi)
- Elevation: 774 m (2,539 ft)

Population (2023)
  - City: 374,809
  - Rank: Within the five current provinces of Burundi, Bujumbura Province is ranked first in population density, making it the most densely populated province in the country.
  - Urban: 1,143,202
  - Urban density: 8,510/km^{2} (22,030/sq mi)
- Time zone: UTC+2 (CAT)
- Gerographic: 22
- Climate: Aw
- Website: www.mairiebujumbura.gov.bi

Bujumbura (French pronunciation: [buʒumbuʁa]; Kirundi pronunciation: [buʒuᵐbuɾa]), formerly Usumbura, is the economic capital, former political capital, largest city and main port of Burundi. It ships most of the country's chief export, coffee, as well as cotton and tin ore. Bujumbura was formerly the country's political capital. In late December 2018, Burundian president Pierre Nkurunziza announced that he would follow through on a 2007 promise to return Gitega its former political capital status, with Bujumbura remaining as economical capital and center of commerce. A vote in the Parliament of Burundi made the change official on 16 January 2019, and as of late 2025, the transition is still ongoing, having been estimated to end in 2022.

== History ==
Bujumbura grew from a small village after it became a military post in German East Africa in 1889. After World War I it was made the administrative center and de facto capital of the Belgian League of Nations mandate of Ruanda-Urundi. The name was changed from Usumbura to Bujumbura upon Burundi's independence in 1962. Since independence, Bujumbura was the scene of frequent fighting between the country's two main ethnic groups, with Hutu militias opposing the Tutsi-dominated Burundi Army during the Burundian Civil War in the early 90s.

During the 1990s civil war, battles between Burundi's two main ethnic groups destroyed hospitals, administrative buildings, the University of Burundi, and other schools in the city, severely crippling the local economy. The Belgian colonial period left a significant architectural mark on the city centre, with buildings constructed in styles popular in Europe during the first half of the 20th century, including elements of Modernism and Art Deco, many of which remain visible in the historical centre today.

== Geography ==
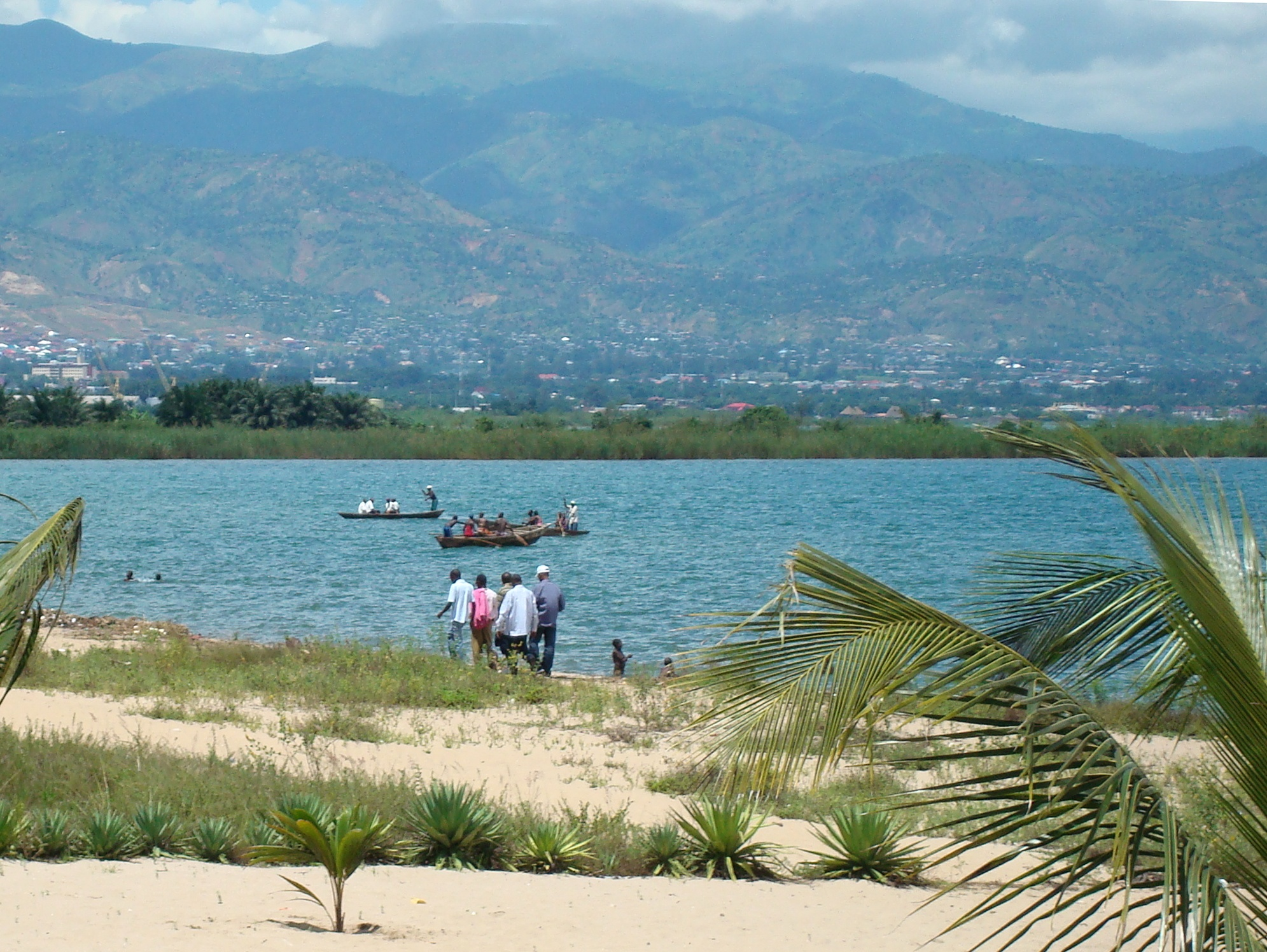
Lake Tanganyika

Bujumbura is on the north-eastern shore of Lake Tanganyika, the second deepest lake in the world after Lake Baikal. The city also lies at the mouth of the Ruzizi River and the smaller Mutimbuzi River, Ntahangwa, Muha and Kanyosha Rivers.

=== Climate ===
Bujumbura has a tropical savanna climate (Köppen: Aw) bordering on hot semi-arid (BSh). There are distinct wet and dry seasons; the wet season being from October to April. Being close to the equator, average temperatures in the city vary little over the year. However due to the moderate altitude, temperatures generally are not as high as expected for a city close to the equator. The high temperature is around 29 °C (84 °F) and the low around 19 °C (66 °F).

Climate data for Bujumbura (1991–2020, extremes 1950–present)
Month	Jan	Feb	Mar	Apr	May	Jun	Jul	Aug	Sep	Oct	Nov	Dec	Year
Record high °C (°F)	34.6 (94.3)	35.0 (95.0)	34.0 (93.2)	35.0 (95.0)	32.0 (89.6)	32.0 (89.6)	33.0 (91.4)	33.0 (91.4)	35.5 (95.9)	34.3 (93.7)	33.8 (92.8)	34.8 (94.6)	35.5 (95.9)
Mean daily maximum °C (°F)	28.5 (83.3)	28.5 (83.3)	28.6 (83.5)	28.3 (82.9)	28.6 (83.5)	28.9 (84.0)	28.8 (83.8)	29.8 (85.6)	30.3 (86.5)	29.7 (85.5)	28.3 (82.9)	28.2 (82.8)	28.9 (84.0)
Daily mean °C (°F)	23.7 (74.7)	23.7 (74.7)	23.8 (74.8)	23.7 (74.7)	23.7 (74.7)	23.2 (73.8)	23.0 (73.4)	24.0 (75.2)	24.8 (76.6)	24.6 (76.3)	23.8 (74.8)	23.7 (74.7)	23.8 (74.8)
Mean daily minimum °C (°F)	18.9 (66.0)	18.9 (66.0)	18.9 (66.0)	19.1 (66.4)	18.7 (65.7)	17.4 (63.3)	17.1 (62.8)	18.1 (64.6)	19.3 (66.7)	19.5 (67.1)	19.2 (66.6)	19.1 (66.4)	18.7 (65.7)
Record low °C (°F)	14.0 (57.2)	15.4 (59.7)	14.7 (58.5)	15.1 (59.2)	16.2 (61.2)	13.9 (57.0)	11.8 (53.2)	13.0 (55.4)	14.3 (57.7)	14.0 (57.2)	15.9 (60.6)	15.0 (59.0)	11.8 (53.2)
Average rainfall mm (inches)	95 (3.7)	102 (4.0)	122 (4.8)	135 (5.3)	55 (2.2)	8 (0.3)	4 (0.2)	12 (0.5)	42 (1.7)	90 (3.5)	142 (5.6)	115 (4.5)	935 (36.8)
Average rainy days (≥ 1 mm)	13	12	15	16	7	1	0	1	5	11	17	16	114
Average relative humidity (%)	77	75	78	79	76	67	63	60	62	68	76	77	72
Mean monthly sunshine hours	167.4	158.2	176.7	165.0	210.8	255.0	272.8	251.1	213.0	189.1	150.0	164.3	2,373.4
Mean daily sunshine hours	5.4	5.6	5.7	5.5	6.8	8.5	8.8	8.1	7.1	6.1	5.0	5.3	6.5
Source 1: World Meteorological Organization
Source 2: Deutscher Wetterdienst (mean temperatures 1950–1990, humidity 1953–1990, and sun 1951–1990)

== Administration ==
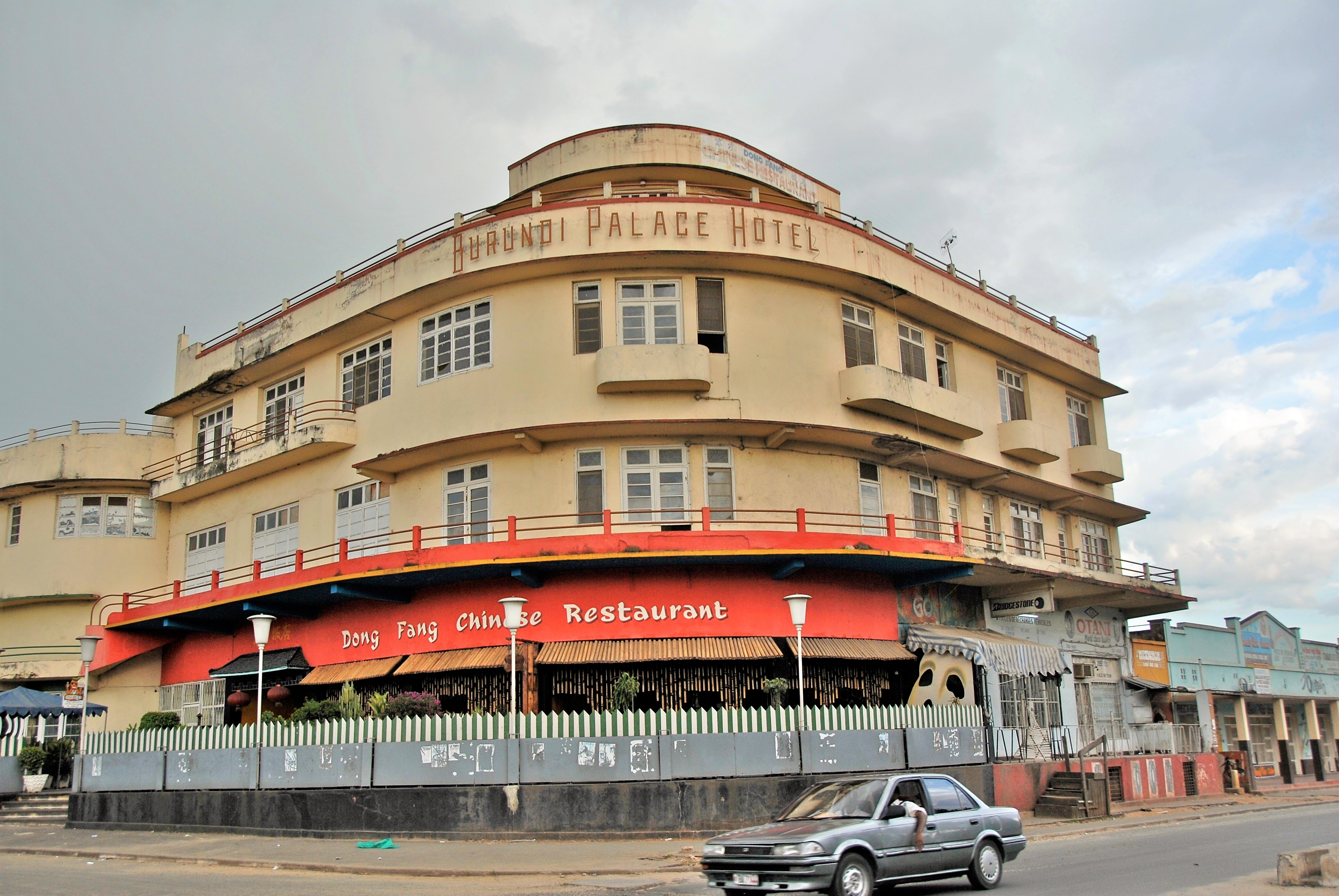
Downtown Bujumbura

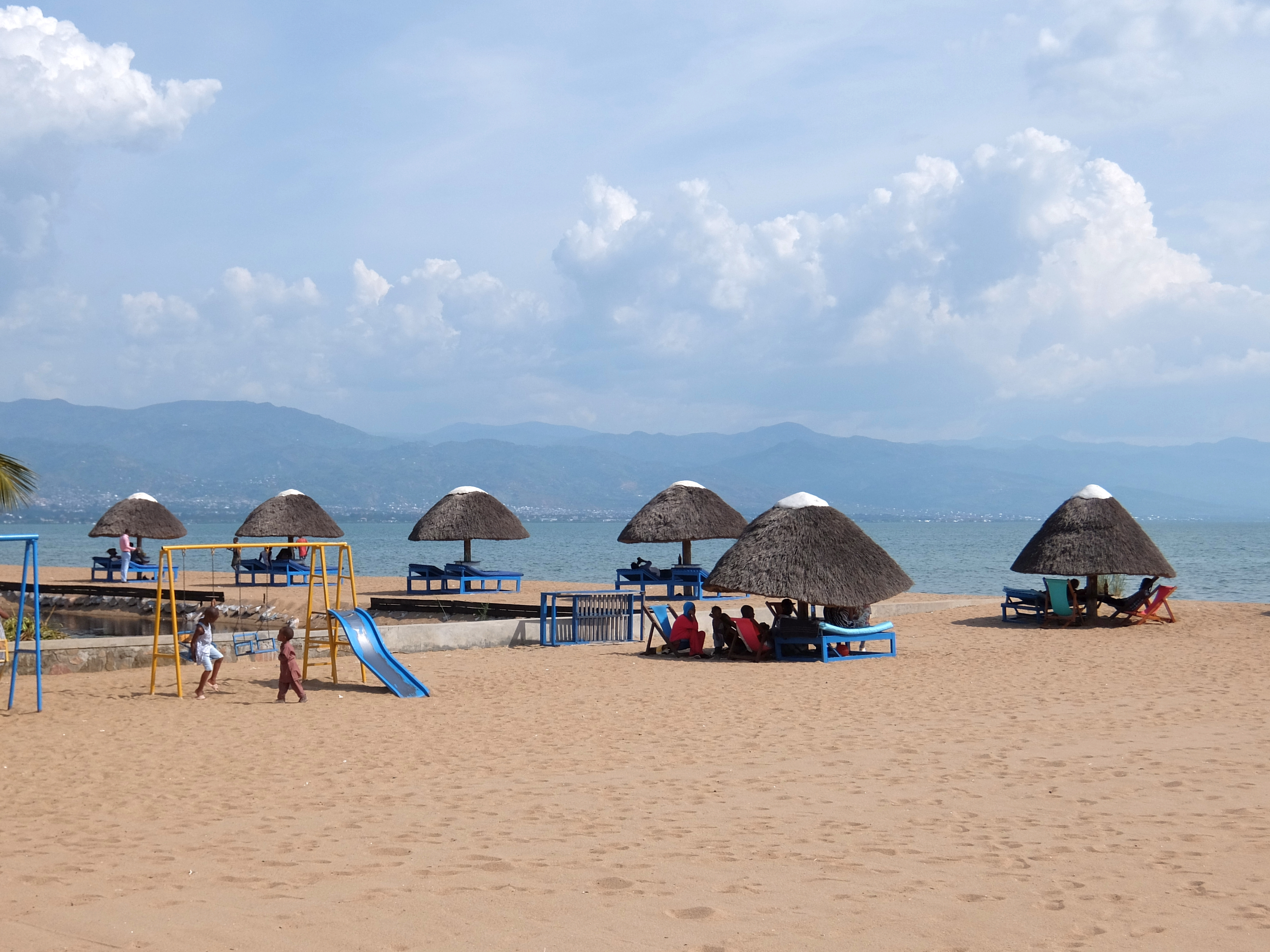
A beach in Bujumbura on the north side of Lake Tanganyika

Bujumbura is governed by a community council and community administrator. Until 2025, it was further divided into three communes, or neighborhoods, each with its own council and council leader.

Before 2025, each of the three communes were created from the 13 former communes (currently sub-communes), due to a 2014 reorganization, which in turn are further sub-divided into villages or zones:

- Commune of Muha
  - Kanyosha
    - Quarters: Gisyo-Nyabaranda, Gisyo, Musama I, Musama II, Musama III, Musama IV, Musama V, Nyabugete, Kizingwe-Bihara, Nkenga-Busoro, Ruziba, Kajiji
  - Kinindo
    - Quarters: Kibenga, Kinanira I, Kinanira II, Kinanira III, Kinanira IV, Kinindo, Zeimet-OUA
  - Musaga
    - Quarters: Gasekebuye-Gikoto, Gitaramuka, Kamesa, Kinanira I, Kinanira II
- Commune of Mukaza
  - Buyenzi
    - Quarters: I, II, III, IV, V, VI, VII
  - Bwiza
    - Quarters: Bwiza I, Bwiza II, Bwiza III, Bwiza IV, Kwijabe I, Kwijabe II, Kwijabe III
  - Nyakabiga
    - Quarters: Kigwati, Nyakabiga I, Nyakabiga II, Nyakabiga III
  - Rohero
    - Quarters: Centre Ville, Rohero I - Gatoke, Kabondo, Mutanga-Sud - Sororezo, Asiatique, I.N.S.S, Rohero II, Kiriri-Vugizo
- Commune of Ntahangwa
  - Buterere
    - Quarters: Buterere I, Buterere II A, Buterere II B, Kabusa, Kiyange, Maramvya, Mubone, Mugaruro, Kiyange
  - Cibitoke
    - Quarters: I, II, III, IV, V, VI, VII
  - Gihosha
    - Quarters: Gasenyi, Gihosha, Gikungu, Kigobe, Mutanga-Nord, Muyaga, Nyabagere, Taba, Winterekwa
  - Kamenge
    - Quarters: Gikizi, Gituro, Heha, Kavumu, Mirango I, Mirango II, Songa, Teza, Twinyoni
  - Kigobe
    - Quarters: Kigobe Nord, Kigobe Sud
  - Kinama
    - Quarters: Bubanza, Buhinyuza, Bukirasazi I, Bukirasazi II, Bururi, Carama, Gitega, Kanga, Muramvya, Muyinga, Ngozi, Ruyigi, SOCARTI.
  - Ngagara
    - Quarters: I, II, III, IV, V, VI, VII, VIII, IX, Industriel

== Economy ==
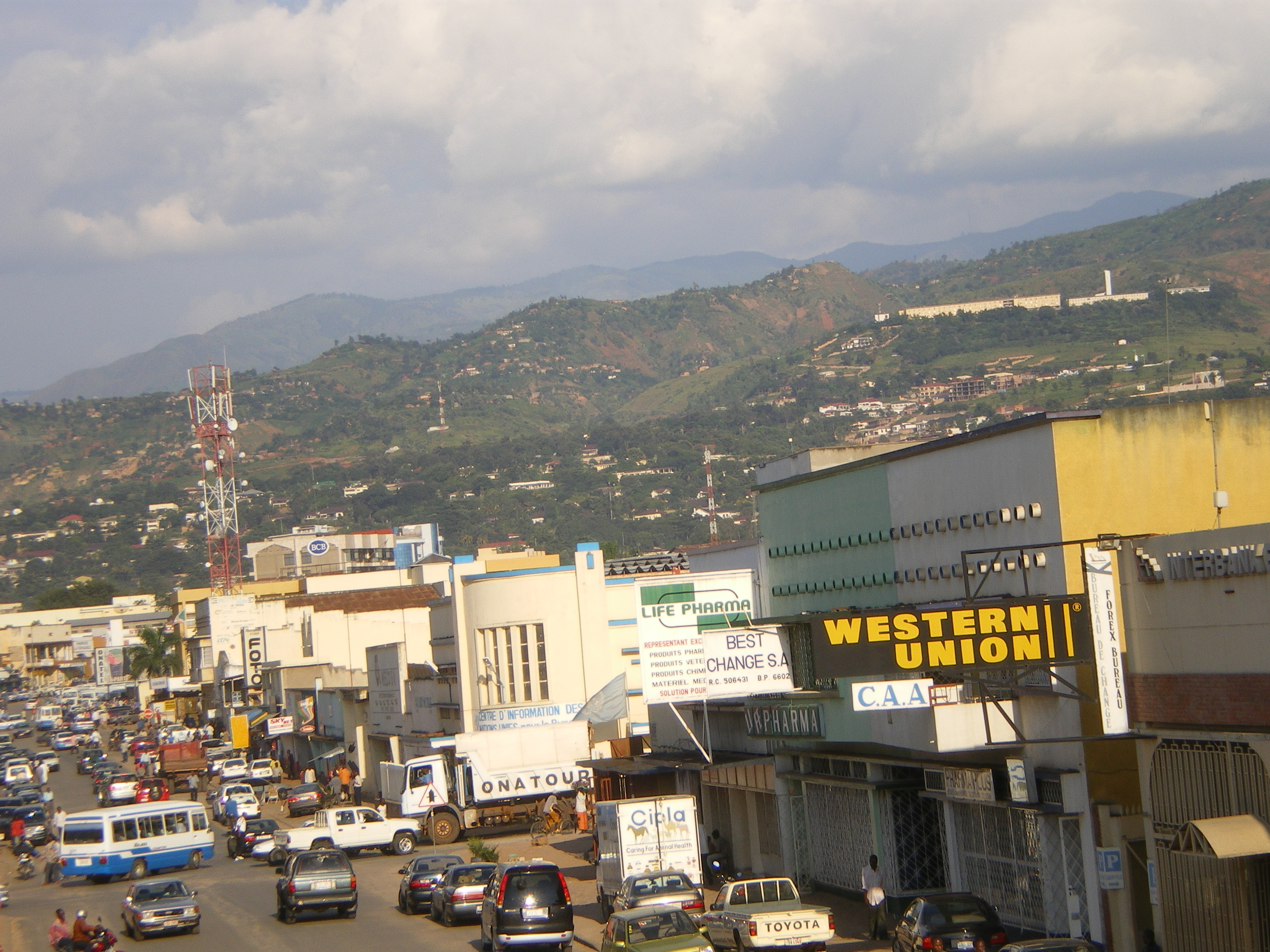
View of Bujumbura Market

The Port of Bujumbura is the largest port on Lake Tanganyika. Burundi depends on neighboring countries for access to the ocean. Goods may be carried by road via Rwanda, or by the lake and then by road or rail via Tanzania, Congo or Zambia. 80% of Burundi's external trade is carried via the last three routes, using the Port of Bujumbura. The port manages receipt and delivery of exports and imports, whether carried by ship or by truck. As of 2011 more than 90% of cargo handled was imports, of which about 60% entered by ship and 40% by truck.

Bujumbura Central Market was in the city centre, along Rwagasore Avenue. During the 1993 ethnic violence in Burundi, citizens became less likely to travel far from the city centre, and markets in neighbouring communities lost their business to the central market. At dawn on 27 January 2013 a serious fire ravaged the central market. Due to the poor emergency response, the fire lasted for hours, resulting in a serious blow to local exchanges. Hundreds of vendors, local and foreign, lost their goods to the fire and the reported looting.

== Politics ==
List of mayors of Bujumbura

Name	Took office	Left office	Notes
Gérard Kibinakanwa	1962	1967	
Thérence Ndikumasabo	1967	1969	
Pie Kanyoni	1969; 1976	1975; 1977	
Charles Kabunyoma	1976	1976	
Juvénal Madirisha	1977	1979	
Germain Nkwirikiye	1979	1981	
Lucien Sakubu	1981	1987	
Léonidas Ndoricimpa	1987	1991	
Arthémon Mvuyekure	1991	1992	
Anatole Kanyenkiko	1992	1993	
Léonce Sinzinkayo	1993	1994	
Pie Ntiyankundiye	1994	2002	
Pontien Niyongabo	2002	2005	
Célestin Sebutama	2005	2007	
Elias Buregure	2007	2007	
Evrard Giswaswa	c. 2008	2012	
Saidi Juma	c. 2012	2015	
Freddy Mbonimpa	2015	2020	
Jimmy Hatungimana	2020	2025	

Under new territorial subdivision, list of governors of Bujumbura:

Name	Took office	Left office	Notes
Aloys Ndayikengurukiye	2025	Present	

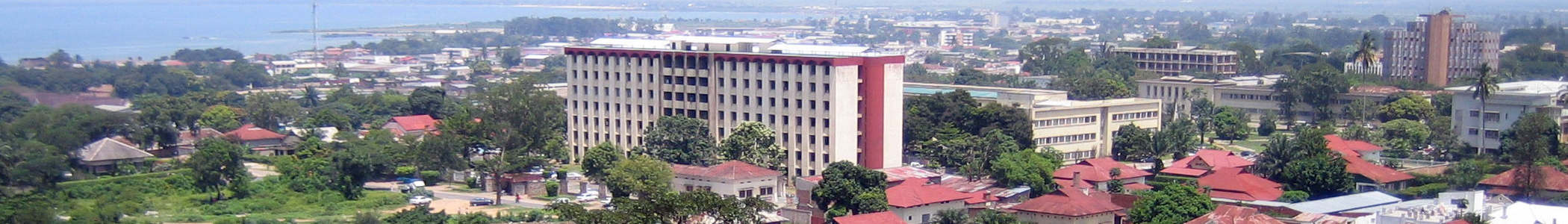
Wide panoramic view of Bujumbura

== Sports ==
Bujumbura is the location for the city's multisport Intwari stadium. Mainly used for football matches, it is the country's largest stadium with 22,000 seats.

The city is also home to many basketball and tennis courts, as well as a multitude of indoor and outdoor swimming pools.

The stadium was refurbished under a FIFA Forward-funded project and officially inaugurated on 31 January 2026. FIFA said the renovated venue’s capacity was 15,000 and that it now has an artificial pitch and floodlights.

== Education ==
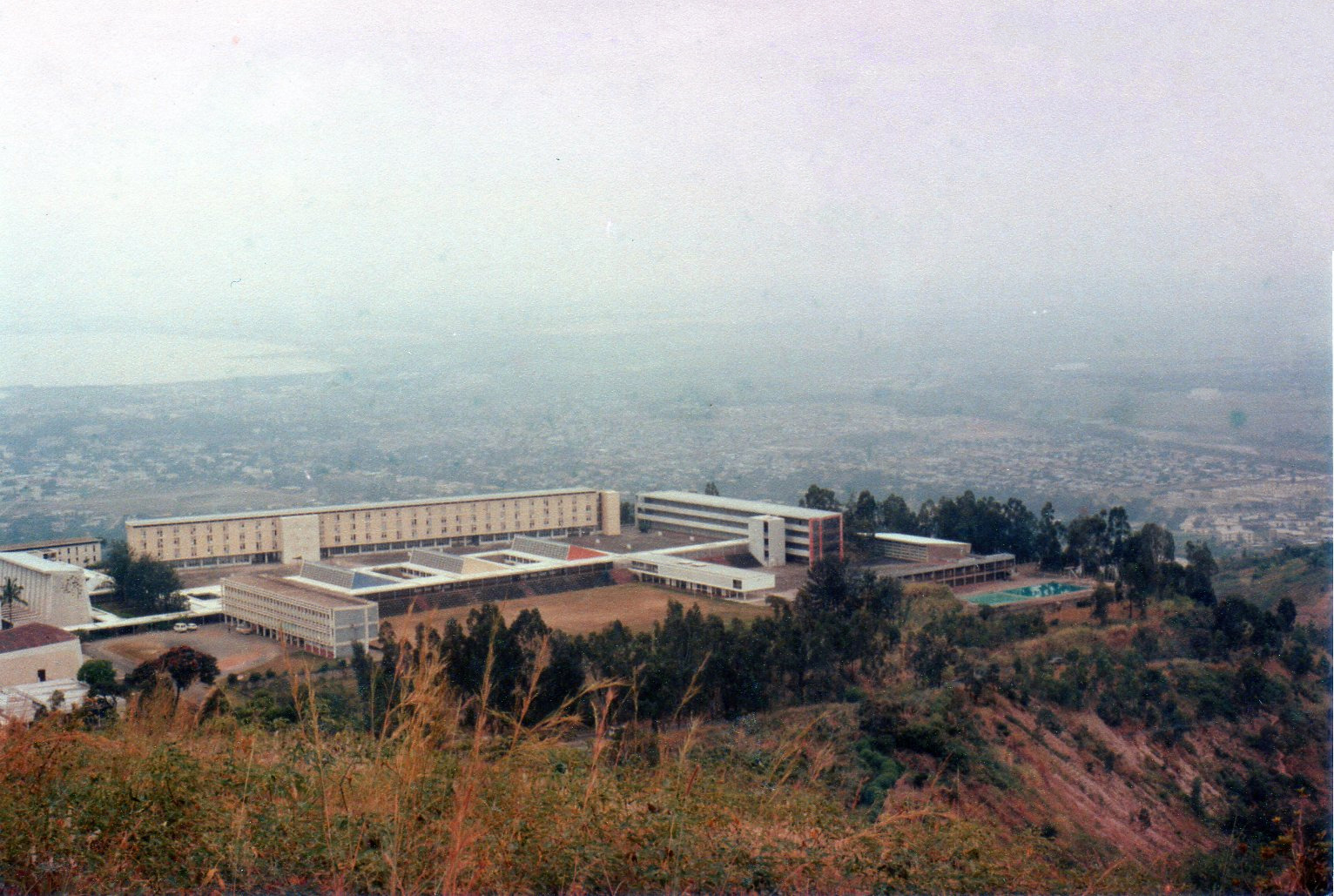
View of the Kiriri campus buildings of the University of Burundi in Bujumbura

Along side the University of Burundi, Bujumbura also hosts several other universities, namely:

- Hope Africa University
- Université Paix et Réconciliation
- Université des Grands Lacs "UGL"
- Université du Lac Tanganyika "ULT"
- Ecole Normale Supérieure "ENS"
- Université Lumière de Bujumbura
- Bujumbura International University "BIU"
- International University of Equator
- International Leadership University of Bujumbura
- Université Ntare Rugamba of Bujumbura
- Université Sagesse d'Afrique de Bujumbura
- Université Martin Luther King
- Institut Supérieur de Développement de Bujumbura "ISD"
- École Nationale d'Administration "ENA"
- Institut National de Santé Publique "INSP"
- Institut Supérieur de Gestion des Entreprises "ISGE"
- Institut Supérieur d'Ingénieurs et Cadres Techniciens en Génie Informatique, Télécommunications et Technologies Avancées "INITELEMATIQUE".

Bujumbura is also host to several international schools:

- École Belge de Bujumbura (Belgian school)
- École Française de Bujumbura (French school)
- King's School (British school)
- Bujumbura International Montessori School
- Burundi English School (English Language School)
- Cubahiro International School
- International Maarif Schools of Burundi (Turkish school)

== Transport ==
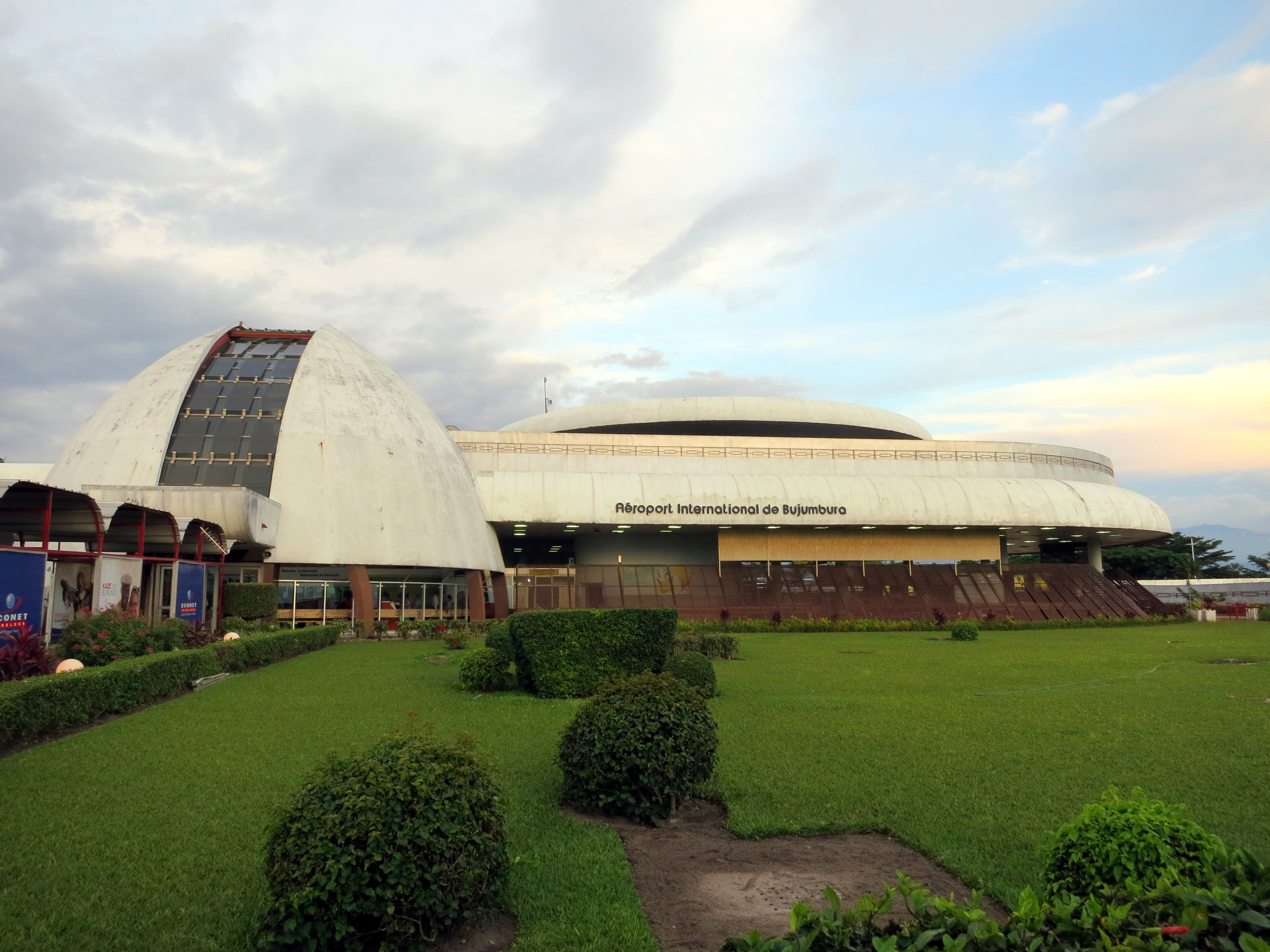
Bujumbura International Airport

The Bujumbura International Airport is situated on the outskirts of the city.

Public transport in Bujumbura mainly consists of taxis and mini-buses, locally known as the Hiace. Public transport vehicles are generally white and blue.

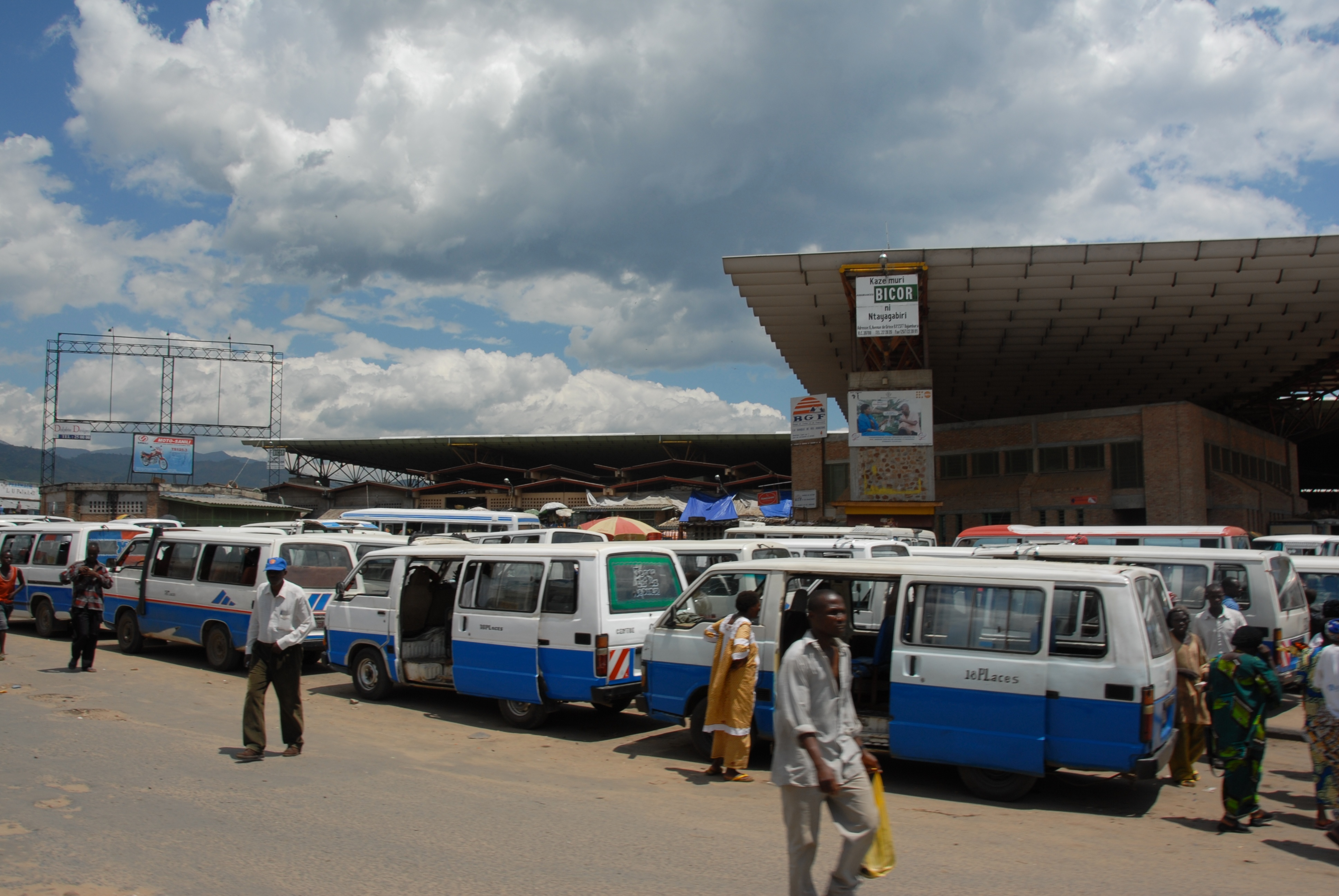
Central Market minibus station

Bujumbura's taxis are abundant all over the city, and are considered the safest form of transportation. There are taxi-motos (motorcycle taxis) and taxis-vélos (bicycle taxis), although they are only available in certain parts of the city.

For long-distance travel, locals prefer to take the many Hiace full-size vans, which travel regularly across Burundi. Bujumbura's main bus terminal is located by the Central Market.

== Health ==
Bujumbura is also home to many clinics along with the province's main hospitals:

- Prince Regent Charles Hospital,
- Roi Khaled Hospital
- Kamenge Military Hospital
- Kira Hospital
- Polyclinique Centrale de Bujumbura
- Tanganyika Care Polyclinic
- CMCK

== Places of worship ==
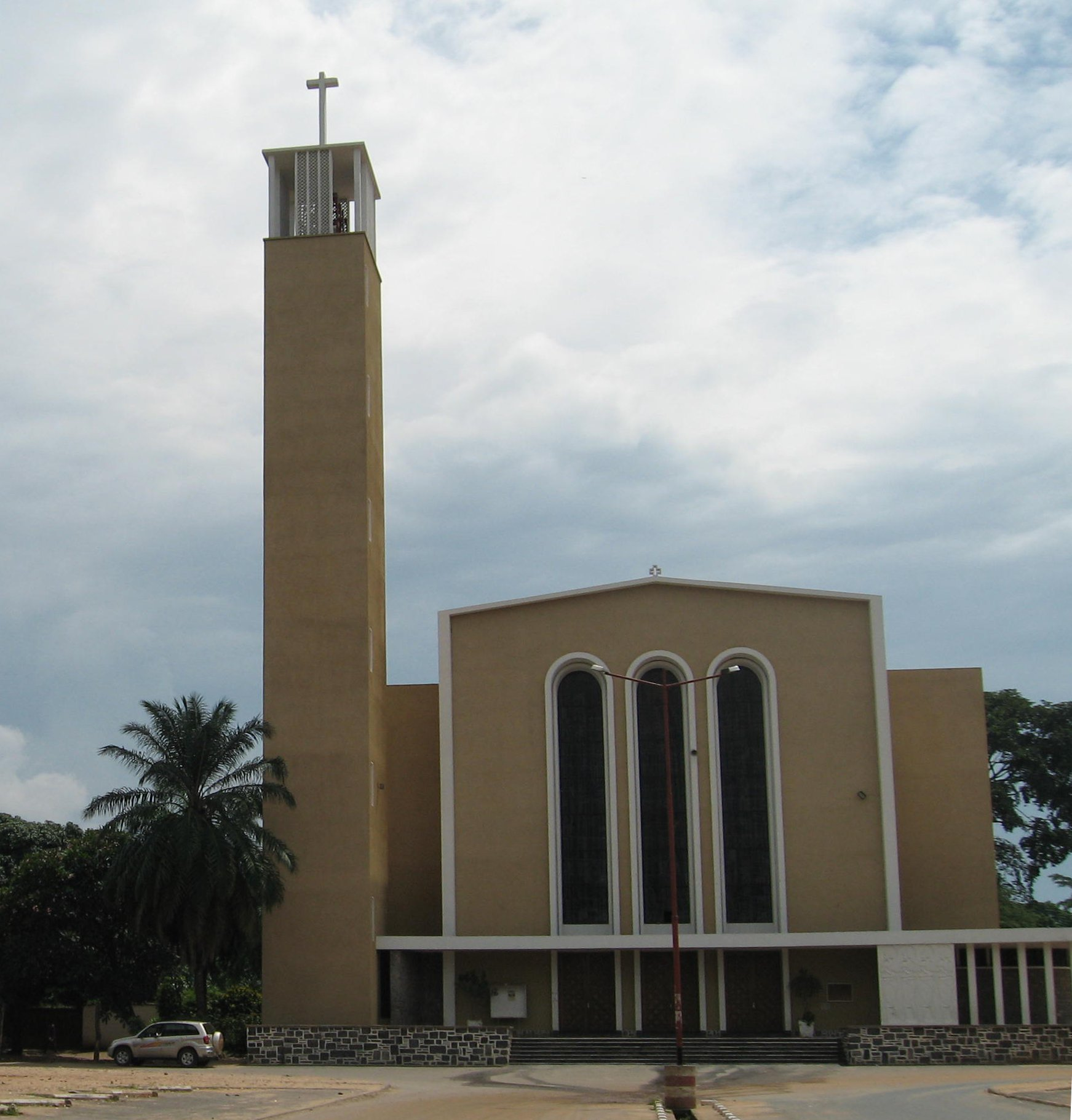
Regina Mundi Cathedral

Among the places of worship are predominantly Christian churches and temples:

- Roman Catholic Archdiocese of Bujumbura (Catholic Church),
- Province of the Anglican Church of Burundi (Anglican Communion)
- Union of Baptist Churches in Burundi (Baptist World Alliance)
- Assemblies of God.

There are also Muslim mosques scattered across the city.

== Culture ==
Bujumbura's main attractions are its many museums, parks and monuments. Museums in the city include the Burundi Museum of Life and the Burundi Geological Museum. Other nearby attractions are the Rusizi National Park, the Livingstone-Stanley Monument at Mugere (where David Livingstone and Henry Morton Stanley visited 14 days after their first historic meeting at Ujiji in Tanzania), the presidential palace and the source of the southernmost tributary of the Nile, described locally as the source of the Nile.

Bujumbura was also home of the independent weekly radio programme Imagine Burundi, the country's first locally produced English-language programme that focused on stories about life in the region. The show was broadcast from September 2010 to August 2013, and recordings are archived on the show's website at imagineburundi.com.

== Demographics ==
Bujumbura is projected to be the fourth fastest growing African continent city between 2020 and 2025, with a 5.75% growth.

== Twin towns and sister cities ==
Bujumbura is twinned with:

- Ubon Ratchathani, Thailand
- Corigliano Calabro, Italy

== Notable people ==
- Jeanne Gapiya-Niyonzima, activist
- Gaël Faye, Rwandan-French author who grew up in Bujumbura
- Ernest Nzigamasabo, basketball player
- Leonard Tangishaka, basketball player

== Sources ==
- Burundi Port of Bujumbura, Logistics Cluster
- Exploitation du Port de Bujumbura (EPB) (PDF), EPB, archived from the original (PDF) on 2024-10-07
- Study of Master Plan for Port Sector in the Republic of Burundi (PDF), Ministry of Transport, Public Works and Equipment, Japan International Cooperation Agency, September 2012
