= Kings Bay (Georgia) =

Coordinates: 30°47′30.85″N 81°29′49.34″W

Kings Bay is a bay in the U.S. state of Georgia.

Kings Bay was named after Thomas King, an early settler.

== See also ==
- Naval Submarine Base Kings Bay
