= Kings (play-by-mail game) =

Fantasy play-by-mail game

- Publishers: JF&L, Dragon Games
- Years active: 1983 to 1993 or later
- Genres: role playing, play-by-mail
- Languages: English
- Playing time: unlimited
- Materials required: Instructions, order sheets, turn results, paper, pencil
- Media type: Play-by-mail

Kings is a fantasy role-playing play-by-mail (PBM) game. Active as of 1983 with JF&L as publisher, it was updated and on its third publisher, Dragon Games, by 1990. Players roleplayed the monarch of a kingdom on a fantasy planet which combined elements of medievalism and heroic fantasy. After initial kingdom setup, players explored the world on a grid map. Economics, combat, intrigue and magic were part of gameplay. The game received neutral to positive reviews in the 1980s with a strong positive review in 1990.

== History and development ==
The game was active as early as 1983. At the time, it was published by JF&L. By 1990 it was updated and being run by Dragon Games, its third publisher.

== Gameplay ==
Kings was a PBM game of medium complexity. Players roleplayed the monarch of a kingdom on a fantasy planet which combined elements of medievalism and heroic fantasy. After initial kingdom setup, players explored the world on a grid map. Economics, combat, intrigue and magic were part of the game.

== Reception ==
Bob McLain reviewed the game in the November–December 1983 issue of PBM Universal calling it a "fairly routine game" and stating, "I've seen better and I've seen worse, but Kings delivers as advertised." Marty Kloeden reviewed the game in the Autumn 1985 issue of Flagship, recommending it for play. He assessed after two years of play that "KINGS is an exciting and challenging PBM game which offers a lot for a fair price."

Mark Macagnone gave the game a strong positive review in the September–October 1990 issue of Paper Mayhem. Out of 5 stars, he rated it 5 stars in every category—Rules, Gamemaster Response, Turn Sheets, Player Input, and Player Enjoyment—giving it an overall rating of 5 stars. In a 1993 issue of Paper Mayhem, the game, still published by Dragon Games, was rated 37 of 81 PBM games with a rating of 6.769 of 9 points.

== See also ==
- List of play-by-mail games

== Bibliography ==
- Editors (July–August 1993). "PBM Game Ratings as of 06/06/93". Paper Mayhem. No. 61. pp. 44–45.
- Macagnone, Mark (September–October 1990). "Kings: A Review". Paper Mayhem. No. 44. pp. 10, 12–13.
- McLain, Bob (November–December 1983). "Gamealog: Kings". PBM Universal. No. 1. p. 29.
- Kloeden, Marty (Autumn 1985). "Kings: The Game of Total Personalized Rule". Flagship. No. 8. pp. 21–22.
