= Deputy Assistant Secretary of the Navy =

Deputy Assistant Secretary of the Navy may refer to the following U.S. offices:

- Deputy Assistant Secretary of the Navy (Acquisition and Procurement)
- Deputy Assistant Secretary of the Navy (Air)
- Deputy Assistant Secretary of the Navy (C4I and Space)
- Deputy Assistant Secretary of the Navy (Civilian Human Resources)
- Deputy Assistant Secretary of the Navy (Environment)
- Deputy Assistant Secretary of the Navy (Expeditionary Programs and Logistics Management)
- Deputy Assistant Secretary of the Navy (Infrastructure Strategy and Analysis)
- Deputy Assistant Secretary of the Navy (Installations & Facilities)
- Deputy Assistant Secretary of the Navy (International Programs)
- Deputy Assistant Secretary of the Navy (Management and Budget)
- Deputy Assistant Secretary of the Navy (Military Personnel Policy)
- Deputy Assistant Secretary of the Navy (Research, Development, Test & Evaluation)
- Deputy Assistant Secretary of the Navy (Reserve Affairs)
- Deputy Assistant Secretary of the Navy (Safety)
- Deputy Assistant Secretary of the Navy (Ships)
- Deputy Assistant Secretary of the Navy (Total Force Transformation)
