= Deputy Assistant Secretary of the Navy (Ships) =

The Deputy Assistant Secretary of the Navy for Ship Programs (DASN Ships) serves as the principal adviser to the Assistant Secretary for Research, Development and Acquisition on issues involving surface ships, submarines and associated weapon systems.

The DASN monitors and advises the assistant secretary on programs managed by the Naval Sea Systems Command, Program Executive Officer (PEO) Ships, PEO Aircraft Carriers, PEO Attack Submarines, PEO Strategic Submarines, PEO Integrated Warfare Systems, PEO Undersea Warfare Systems, PEO Unmanned and Small Combatants, Military Sealift Command, and Strategic Systems Programs. DASN (Ships) also represents ASN (RDA) on the board of directors for the Naval Aviation Enterprise, the Under Sea Enterprise, and the Surface Warfare Enterprise.

The current acting DASN (Ships) is Lisa Radocha.

Name	Assumed office	Left office	Assistant Secretary served under
Allison Stiller	2004	2015	John J. Young, Jr. Delores M. Etter; John S. Thackrah; Sean Stackley
Gloria Valdez	2015	April 2018	Sean Stackley; James Geurts
Frederick J. Stefany	April 2018	November 2019	James Geurts
Bilyana Anderson	November 2019	October 2024	James Geurts; Frederick J. Stefany (acting) Nickolas Guertin
