= Deputy Assistant Secretary of the Navy (C4I and Space) =

The Deputy Assistant Secretary of the Navy for Information Warfare and Enterprise Services (DASN (IWAR)) is a civilian office of the United States Department of the Navy. The DASN (IWAR) reports to the Assistant Secretary of the Navy for Research, Development and Acquisition, and serves as the principal adviser to the assistant secretary on issues involving Command, Control, Communications, Computers and Intelligence (C4I) programs; enterprise information technologies; business systems; and enterprise services. DASN IWAR is dual-hatted as the Department of the Navy Chief Information Officer’s (DON CIO) Chief Technology Officer (CTO).

DASN IWAR works closely with Naval Information Warfare Systems Command (NAVWAR); PEO (C4I); PEO (Space Systems); PEO (Enterprise Information Systems); and other systems commands engaging in C4I.

The current DASN (IWAR) is Mr. Sean Moone (acting).

Name	Assumed office	Left office	Assistant Secretary served under
Dr. Gary Federici	September 2004	October 2010	John J. Young, Jr. Delores M. Etter; John S. Thackrah; Sean Stackley
Dr. John Zangardi	March 2011	October 2016	Sean Stackley
Mr. Victor Gavin	October 2016	June 2018	Sean Stackley; James Geurts
Ms. Jane Rathbun	June 2018	November 2023	James Geurts; Frederick J. Stefany (acting); Nickolas Guertin
Mr. Sean Moone (acting)	November 2023	Incumbent	Nickolas Guertin
