= Deputy Assistant Secretary of the Navy (International Programs) =

The Deputy Assistant Secretary of the Navy for International Programs (DASN (IP)) is an office of the United States Department of the Navy. The DASN (IP) reports to the Assistant Secretary of the Navy for Research, Development and Acquisition, and serves as the principal adviser to the assistant secretary on issues involving international programs.

The current DASN (IP) is Rear Admiral Raymond P Owens.

Name	Assumed office	Left office	Assistant Secretary served under
RDML Mark Milliken	2005	Oct 2007	Delores Etter
RADM Nevin Carr	2007	Aug 2009	Sean Stackley
RDML Steven Voetch	2009	August 2010	Sean Stackley
RADM Joseph Rixey	2010	August 2013	Sean Stackley
RADM James J. Shannon	Sept 2013	Sept 2016	Sean Stackley
RADM Francis D. Morley	Sept 2016	August 2021	Sean Stackley, James Geurts
RDML Anthony E. “Tony” Rossi	August 2021	June 2025	James Geurts, Frederick J. Stefany (PTDO), Tommy Ross (PTDO)
RDML Raymond P. Owens	June 2025	Present	Jason Potter
