= Assistant General Counsel of the Navy (Research, Development and Acquisitions) =

The Assistant General Counsel of the Navy (Research, Development and Acquisition) (AGC RDA) serves as the chief acquisition attorney for the Department of the Navy (under the General Counsel of the Navy) and as the senior legal adviser to the Assistant Secretary for Research, Development and Acquisition (ASN (RDA)).

The office of AGC (RDA) includes more than 30 attorneys who advise the ASN (RDA) and the DASNs on a wide range of acquisition issues involving multibillion-dollar shipbuilding, aircraft and weapons programs. The AGC also sets Departmental legal policy pertaining to government contracts and procurement matters.

The current AGC (RDA) is Thomas L. Frankfurt.

Name	Assumed office	Left office	Assistant Secretary advised
Thomas Frankfurt	2009	Current	Sean Stackley, James Geurts
