= Deputy Assistant Secretary of the Navy (Acquisition and Procurement) =

The Deputy Assistant Secretary of the Navy for Procurement (DASN P) serves as the principal adviser to the Assistant Secretary for Research, Development and Acquisition on contracting and acquisition policy.

The DASN P serves as the Navy's Competition Advocate General, and advises the ASN on Federal Acquisition Regulation (FAR), Defense Acquisition Regulations System (DFARS) and Navy-specific acquisition regulations and policies.

As of April, 2026 current DASN (P) is Mr. Michael Brown.

Name	Assumed office	Left office	Assistant Secretary served under
RADM Sean Crean	2007	2009	Sean Stackley
RDML David Baucom	2009	2011	Sean Stackley
Elliott Branch	2011	2019	Sean Stackley, James Geurts
