= Deputy Assistant Secretary of the Navy (Expeditionary Programs and Logistics Management) =

The Deputy Assistant Secretary of the Navy for Expeditionary Programs and Logistics Management (DASN (ELM)) is a civilian office of the United States Department of the Navy. The DASN (ELM) reports to the Assistant Secretary of the Navy for Research, Development and Acquisition, and serves as the principal adviser to the assistant secretary involving three areas: expeditionary and ground programs; rapid acquisition and urgent needs; and logistics and sustainability.

For expeditionary systems, DASN (ELM) oversees and advises the assistant secretary on programs managed by the Marine Corps Systems Command, Naval Facilities Engineering Command and Naval Sea Systems Command. The DASN is charged with overseeing systems which support operating forces in an expeditionary role, including U.S. Marine Corps programs such as combat and amphibious vehicles, tactical wheeled vehicles, tanks, ground radars, command and control, body armor, small arms, munitions, artillery and military working dogs. The DASN also engages on Navy expeditionary programs such as explosive ordnance disposal and counter measures for improvised explosive devices; biometrics; unmanned underwater vehicles; and programs supporting special forces. In addition, the DASN sets policy for the Department's marine mammals program.

For rapid acquisition and urgent needs, the DASN advises the assistant secretary on relevant programs within all six of the Naval systems commands as well as the Office of Naval Research, and encompasses Joint Urgent Operational Needs (JUONs), USMC Urgent Universal Needs (UUNs) and Navy Urgent Operational Needs (UONs).

For sustainability and logistics, the DASN advises the assistant secretary on programs managed by Naval Supply Systems Command as well as other Naval systems commands and the Office of Naval Research. Programs include the Department's Independent Logistics Assessment, a tool to evaluate sustainment operations; performance-based logistics; and other efforts to manage total ownership costs while meeting performance standards.

The current DASN (ELM) is Jimmy Smith.

| Name | Assumed office | Left office | Assistant Secretary served under |
|---|---|---|---|
| Brian Detter | August 2009 | August 2012 | Sean Stackley |
| Tom Dee | December 2012 | December 2016 | Sean Stackley |
| Jimmy Smith | March 2017 | Incumbent | Sean Stackley, James Geurts |
