= Carlos Del Toro =

Cuban-American entrepreneur and retired United States Navy officer (born 1961)

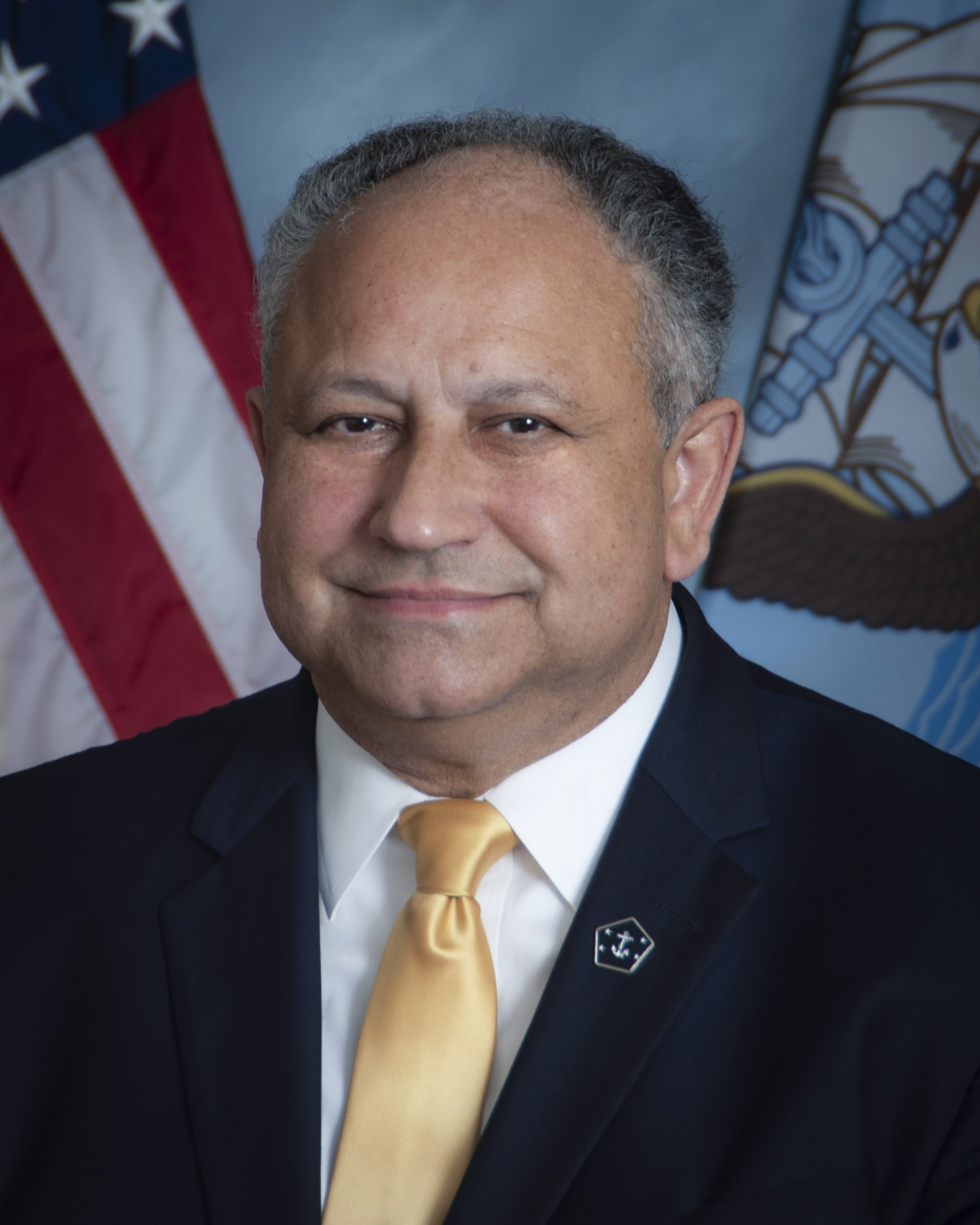
- Official portrait, 2021

78th United States Secretary of the Navy
- In office August 9, 2021 – January 20, 2025
- President: Joe Biden
- Deputy: James Geurts (acting); Meredith Berger (acting); Erik Raven; Thomas Mancinelli (acting)
- Preceded by: Kenneth Braithwaite
- Succeeded by: John Phelan

Personal details
- Born: 1961 (age 64–65) Havana, Cuba
- Party: Democratic
- Spouse: Betty Del Toro
- Children: 4
- Education: United States Naval Academy (BS); Naval Postgraduate School (MS); Naval War College (MA); George Washington University (MPS)

Military service
- Allegiance: United States
- Branch/service: United States Navy
- Rank: Commander
- Del Toro's voice Del Toro opening a Senate Appropriations subcommittee hearing on the FY2024 Navy and Marine Corps posture Recorded March 28, 2023

Carlos Del Toro (born 1961) is a Cuban-American entrepreneur and retired United States Navy officer who served as the 78th United States secretary of the Navy from 2021 to 2025. He is the second Hispanic American to serve as the secretary of the Navy, after Edward Hidalgo.

== Early life and education ==
Del Toro was born in Havana, Cuba, and immigrated to the United States with his parents as a child. He was raised in Hell's Kitchen, Manhattan. Del Toro earned a Bachelor of Science degree in electrical engineering from the United States Naval Academy in 1983. Del Toro later earned a Master of Arts in national security studies from the Naval War College and also a Master of Professional Studies degree in legislative affairs from George Washington University.

== Career ==
Del Toro was a White House Fellow in 1998–1999.

Del Toro served in the United States Navy as a Surface Warfare Officer for 22 years, retiring with the rank of commander. During his service, Del Toro served in the Office of the Secretary of Defense and special assistant to the director and deputy director of the Office of Management and Budget. He was also the commanding officer of the USS Bulkeley.

After retiring from the Navy, Del Toro founded SBG Technology Solutions, Inc., a program management and engineering firm that primarily works with government clients. In 2007, Del Toro was the Democratic candidate to represent the 88th District in the Virginia House of Delegates. He lost to Republican incumbent, Mark Cole. He served on the University of Mary Washington Board of Visitors from 2014 to 2018. From 2019 until 2021, Del Toro sat on the board of directors of the Stimson Center, a Washington-based security think tank.

== Secretary of the Navy ==
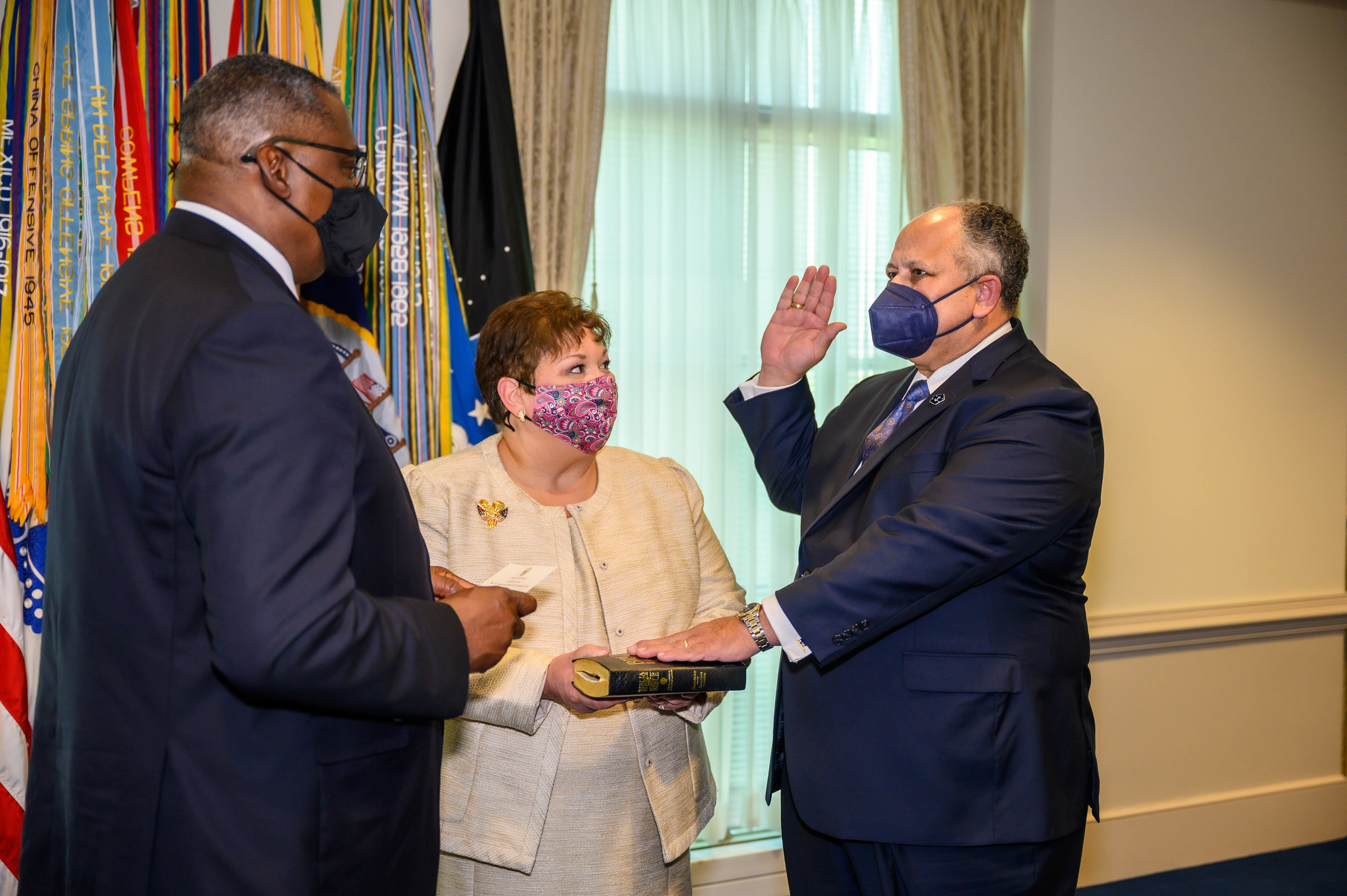
Secretary of Defense Lloyd Austin swears in Del Toro as the 78th secretary of the Navy at the Pentagon, August 24, 2021.

Del Toro's nomination as Secretary of the Navy was announced by President Joe Biden on June 11, 2021 and received by Congress on June 17. Del Toro's nomination received praise from Armed Services Committee Chairman Jack Reed, who described the nominee as an "excellent selection."

During a July 13 committee confirmation hearing before the Senate Armed Services Committee, Del Toro received "mostly friendly" questions from senators, although some Republicans expressed concerns about the size and perceived inadequacy of President Biden's FY2022 defense budget and America's commitment and ability to defend Taiwan amidst rising U.S.–China tensions and a recent American failure to defend the island nation in a military simulation.

In regard to the budget, Del Toro supported the Navy's plan to field 355 ships by 2030, but noted that the service would require more funds. In regard to Taiwan, Del Toro affirmed his commitment to the island's protection and stated that he would be "exclusively focused on the China threat" and seek to protect American security interests in the Indo-Pacific. Del Toro also expressed an intention to focus on climate change and modernization efforts.

On July 27, the Senate Armed Services Committee approved Del Toro's nomination, advancing him to the full Senate. On August 7, 2021, his nomination was confirmed by voice vote. He assumed office on August 9, 2021, and was ceremonially sworn in on August 24, 2021.

=== Controversies ===
In April 2023, the Military Religious Freedom Foundation shared a video of a town hall meeting where Del Toro made comments which some observers perceived as homophobic. When asked about combating homophobia in the navy, Del Toro said, "The battles that you face... they're defined by your choice to be homosexual." Del Toro's comments were criticized as promoting homosexuality as a "choice", and also being oblivious to homophobia within the military. Del Toro later said that he had misspoken, was "an unequivocal supporter of the LGBTQ+ community," and was talking about "an individual's decision to share their sexual orientation."

On September 5, 2024, the United States Office of Special Counsel announced that it had determined that Secretary Del Toro had violated the Hatch Act through his statements voicing support for President Joe Biden during a work trip to the United Kingdom that January.

== Personal life ==
Del Toro is married to Betty Del Toro, with whom he has four children, along with three grandchildren.

Political offices
Preceded by Kenneth Braithwaite	United States Secretary of the Navy; 2021–2025	Succeeded by John Phelan
