= Deputy Assistant Secretary of the Navy (Research, Development, Test & Evaluation) =

The Deputy Assistant Secretary of the Navy for Research, Development, Test and Evaluation (abbreviated DASN (RDT&E) or DASN RDTE) serves as the principal adviser to the United States Assistant Secretary for Research, Development and Acquisition on all matters pertaining to science, technology, advanced research and development programs; system prototype programs; and management of science and engineering.

The DASN (RDT&E) monitors and coordinates with senior Naval officials among the various warfare centers and labs, including the Naval Research Laboratory; the Office of Naval Research; the Naval systems commands; and others in the Naval enterprise to facilitate advancement of technology systems into the fleet.

The current DASN (RDT&E) is Pete Reddy.

Name	Assumed office	Left office	Assistant Secretary served under
Mary Lacey	2011	2015	Sean Stackley
John Burrow	2015	2017	Sean Stackley
William Bray	2017	2020	Sean Stackley; James Geurts
Joan Johnson	2020	present	James Geurts; Frederick J. Stefany (acting)
