= Deputy Assistant Secretary of the Navy (Management and Budget) =

Civilian office advising US Navy

The Deputy Assistant Secretary of the Navy for Management and Budget (DASN M&B) is a civilian office in the United States Department of the Navy serving as the principal adviser to the Assistant Secretary for Research, Development and Acquisition on issues involving programming, planning, budgeting, acquisition programmatics, analysis, and Congressional liaison issues.

The current DASN (M&B) is B.J. White-Olson.

Name	Assumed office	Left office	Assistant Secretary served under
B.J. White-Olson	December 2009	Current	Sean Stackley, James Geurts
