= Deputy Assistant Secretary of the Navy (Air) =

The Deputy Assistant Secretary of the Navy for Air/Ground Programs (DASN (Air/Ground)) is a civilian office in the United States Department of the Navy. The DASN (Air/Ground) reports to the Assistant Secretary of the Navy for Research, Development and Acquisition, and serves as the principal adviser to the Assistant Secretary on issues involving aircraft, sea-based cruise missiles, air-launched weapons and other airborne systems.

The DASN monitors and advises the assistant secretary on programs managed by the Naval Air Systems Command; tactical aircraft programs; air anti-submarine programs; Unmanned Aerial Vehicles; the Joint Strike Fighter and other programs. The DASN makes programmatic and technical development recommendations; conducts independent studies; and analyzes industry capability for production and repair of aircraft.

The current DASN (Air/Ground) is William "Bill" E. Taylor.

| Name | Assumed office | Left office | Assistant Secretary served under |
|---|---|---|---|
| Thomas Laux | August 2008 | April 2011 | Sean Stackley |
| Richard Gilpin | April 2011 | June 2014 | Sean Stackley |
| Gary Kessler | October 2014 | February 2018 | Sean Stackley, James Geurts |
| Daniel Nega | February 2018 | April 2020 | James Geurts |
