= Chris Bertram =

American government official

Christopher P. Bertram is a former Assistant Secretary for Budget and Programs, and Chief Financial Officer, for the United States Department of Transportation. As Assistant Secretary, he was responsible for the Department's budget, which totaled over $70 billion per year. He also oversaw the financial and performance management of the 12 agencies within the Department. Until August 2009, Bertram was a senior professional staff member with the Senate Committee on Commerce, Science, and Transportation. In that position, he was involved in developing legislation related to aviation, auto and highway safety, transportation security, pipelines, railroads, and fuel efficiency standards for automobiles. Prior to joining the Commerce Committee, Bertram was the Federal Aviation Administration's Assistant Administrator for Financial Services and Chief Financial Officer. He has also served as Staff Director for the House of Representatives' United States House Transportation Subcommittee on Highways and Transit, and in various positions at the Office of Management and Budget.
