= Brian Detter =

- Born: Brian R. Detter
- Education: University of Wisconsin-Madison, B.A.
- Occupation: business executive

Brian R. Detter is an American business executive and formerly served as a deputy assistant secretary of the Navy (DASN).

== Early life and education ==
Detter was raised in Madison, Wisconsin. He graduated from La Follette High School, and received a bachelor of arts degree from the University of Wisconsin-Madison, with a double major in journalism and political science.

== Defense, foreign policy and business experience ==
From 2009-12, he served as Deputy Assistant Secretary of the Navy (Expeditionary Programs and Logistics Management), managing a portfolio that included Navy and Marine Corps ground systems; research and development; urgent needs; and logistics and sustainment. He also had responsibility for several joint programs, including the MRAP program and the joint counter radio-controlled IED warfare (JCREW) program.

Previously, he served in the legislative affairs division at the U.S. Agency for International Development. He served with the U.S. State Department in Riyadh, Saudi Arabia as special assistant to the U.S. ambassador, and later in Washington as special assistant to the under secretary of state for Global Affairs.

Earlier in his career, he worked as a defense analyst for the nonpartisan Congressional Research Service, and has worked in senior position on Capitol Hill, both House and Senate sides. He also served as director of federal relations for the International Council of Shopping Centers.

== Personal and community service ==
Detter is active in his community. He currently serves on the board of trustees of the Code of Support Foundation, a military services organization. From 2015-19, he served on the board of visitors of the Virginia Military Institute. He has served as a member of the Army Science Board, and has served as a consultant to the board; additionally, he has served on panels to evaluate Army proposals for science and technology awards, and has worked with the Air Force and with NATO. He has served as an advisor to TRI-COR Industries, an IT services and cyber security firm. He is a resident of McLean, Virginia.

Government offices
Preceded by Roger Smith	Deputy Assistant Secretary of the Navy (Expeditionary Programs and Logistics Management); August 2009 – August 2012	Succeeded by Thomas Dee
