= Brian Corey =

U.S. Navy admiral

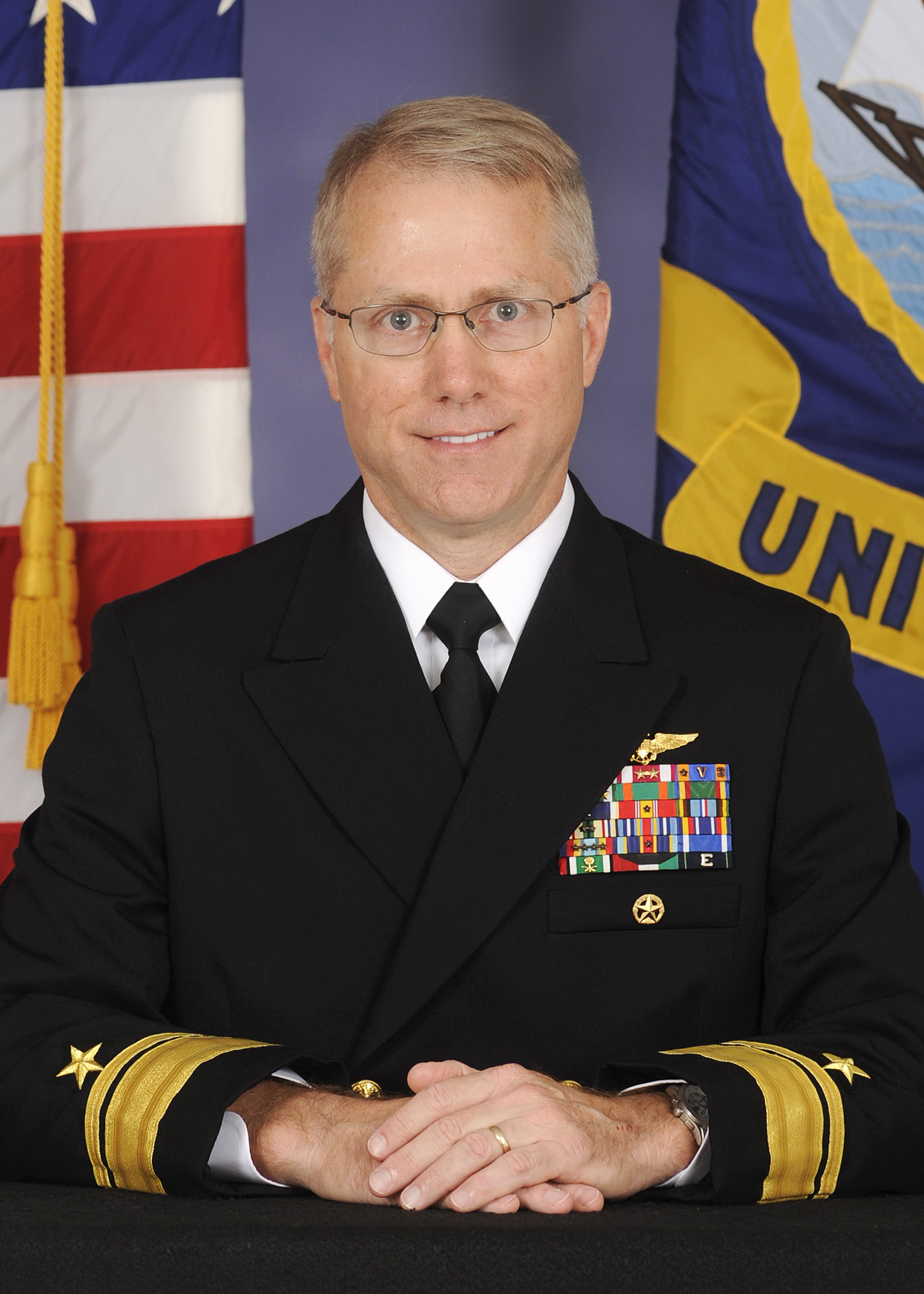
- Official portrait, 2018
- Born: 1963 (age 62–63)
- Military career
- Allegiance: United States
- Branch: United States Navy
- Service years: 198X–2024
- Rank: Rear Admiral
- Commands: Naval Air Warfare Center Weapons Division; PMA-242; VFA-192

Brian Keith Corey (born 1963) is a retired United States Navy rear admiral who is the Program Executive Officer for Unmanned Air Systems and Strike Weapons of the Naval Air Systems Command since May 3, 2018 to May 19, 2022. He was previously the Commander of the Naval Air Warfare Center Weapons Division from October 2015 to April 2018.

Raised in Granite City, Illinois, Corey graduated from Granite City North High School in 1981. He then attended the University of Illinois at Urbana–Champaign and earned a B.S. degree in chemical engineering. Corey later graduated from the Naval Test Pilot School and received a master's degree in national security and strategic studies from the Naval War College.

Military offices
Preceded by Michael T. Moran	Commander of the Naval Air Warfare Center Weapons Division; 2015–2018	Succeeded by William S. Dillon
Preceded by Mark W. Darrah	Program Executive Officer for Unmanned Air Systems and Strike Weapons of the Naval Air Systems Command; 2018–2024	Succeeded by Stephen R. Tedford
