= Scott Pappano =

U.S. Navy admiral

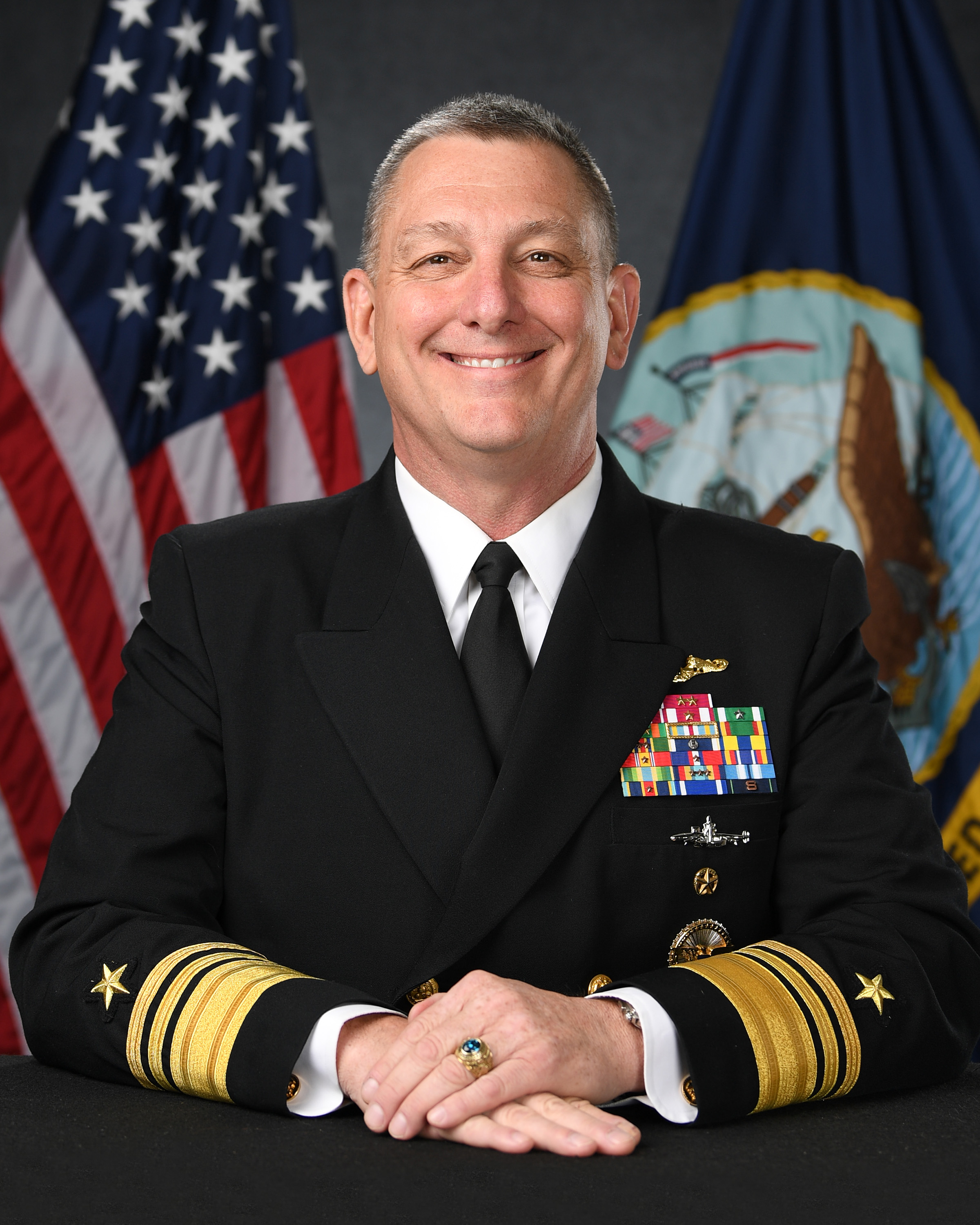
- Official portrait, 2024
- Born: c. 1967 (age 58–59); Bethlehem, Pennsylvania, U.S.
- Military career
- Allegiance: United States
- Branch: United States Navy
- Service years: 1989–2025
- Rank: Vice Admiral
- Commands: PEO Strategic Submarines; PEO Columbia; Naval Undersea Warfare Center; Comprehensive Test Facility; USS Buffalo (SSN-715); Submarine Development Squadron 12 Tactical Action Group
- Awards: Legion of Merit (3)

Scott W. Pappano (born c. 1967) is a retired United States Navy vice admiral who last served as the principal military deputy to the assistant secretary of the Navy (research, development, and acquisition) since 26 June 2024 to March 2025. He previously served as the program executive officer for strategic submarines, and as the commander of the Naval Undersea Warfare Center.

In May 2024, Pappano was nominated for promotion to vice admiral and assignment as principal military deputy to the assistant secretary of the Navy (research, development, and acquisition).

On February 3, 2025, President Donald Trump nominated Pappano to be Principal Deputy Administrator of the National Nuclear Security Administration. The U.S. Senate confirmed him on September 18, 2025, and he assumed office later that month.

Pappano retired from the Navy in March 2025 after over 33 years of service.

Military offices
Preceded by Moises DelToro III	Commander of the Naval Undersea Warfare Center; 2018–2019	Succeeded by Eric H. Ver Hage
New office	Program Executive Officer for Strategic Submarines of the United States Navy; 2019–2024	Succeeded by Todd S. Weeks
Preceded by Francis D. Morley	Principal Military Deputy to the Assistant Secretary of the Navy of the Research, Development and Acquisition; 2024–2025	Succeeded by E. Seiko Okano
