= Francis D. Morley =

U.S. Navy admiral

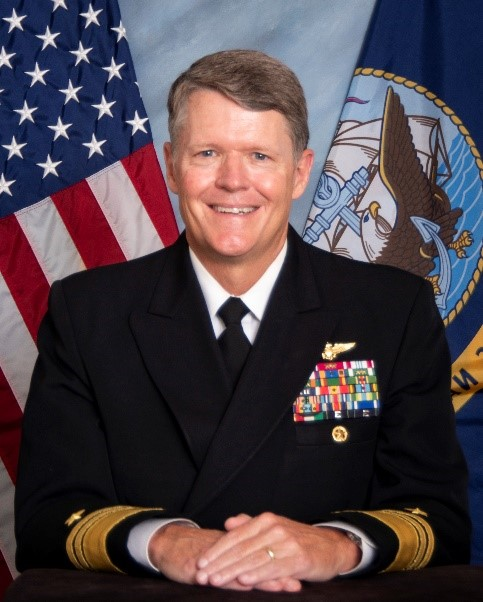
- Born: 1966 (age 59–60)
- Military career
- Allegiance: United States
- Branch: United States Navy
- Service years: 1988–2024
- Rank: Vice Admiral
- Nickname: Frank

Francis David Morley (born 1966) is a retired United States Navy vice admiral who served as the Principal Military Deputy to the Assistant Secretary of the Navy (Research, Development and Acquisition) from 2021 to 2024. He most recently served as the Deputy Assistant Secretary of the United States Navy for International Programs from 2016 to 2021. Previously, he was the Vice Commander of the Naval Air Systems Command from 2015 to 2016.

Raised in Phoenix, Arizona, Morley earned a B.S. degree in physics from San Diego State University. Designated a naval aviator, he also graduated from the United States Naval Test Pilot School. Morley later received an M.S. degree in aviation systems from the University of Tennessee as well as National Security Studies and International Security from George Washington University and Harvard Kennedy School of Government respectively.

Military offices
Preceded by James Shannon	Deputy Assistant Secretary of the United States Navy for International Programs; 2016–2021	Succeeded by Anthony E. Rossi
Preceded by Michael T. Moran	Principal Military Deputy to the Assistant Secretary of the Navy of the Research, Development and Acquisition; 2021–2024	Succeeded by Scott Pappano
