= Erik Raven =

American political advisor

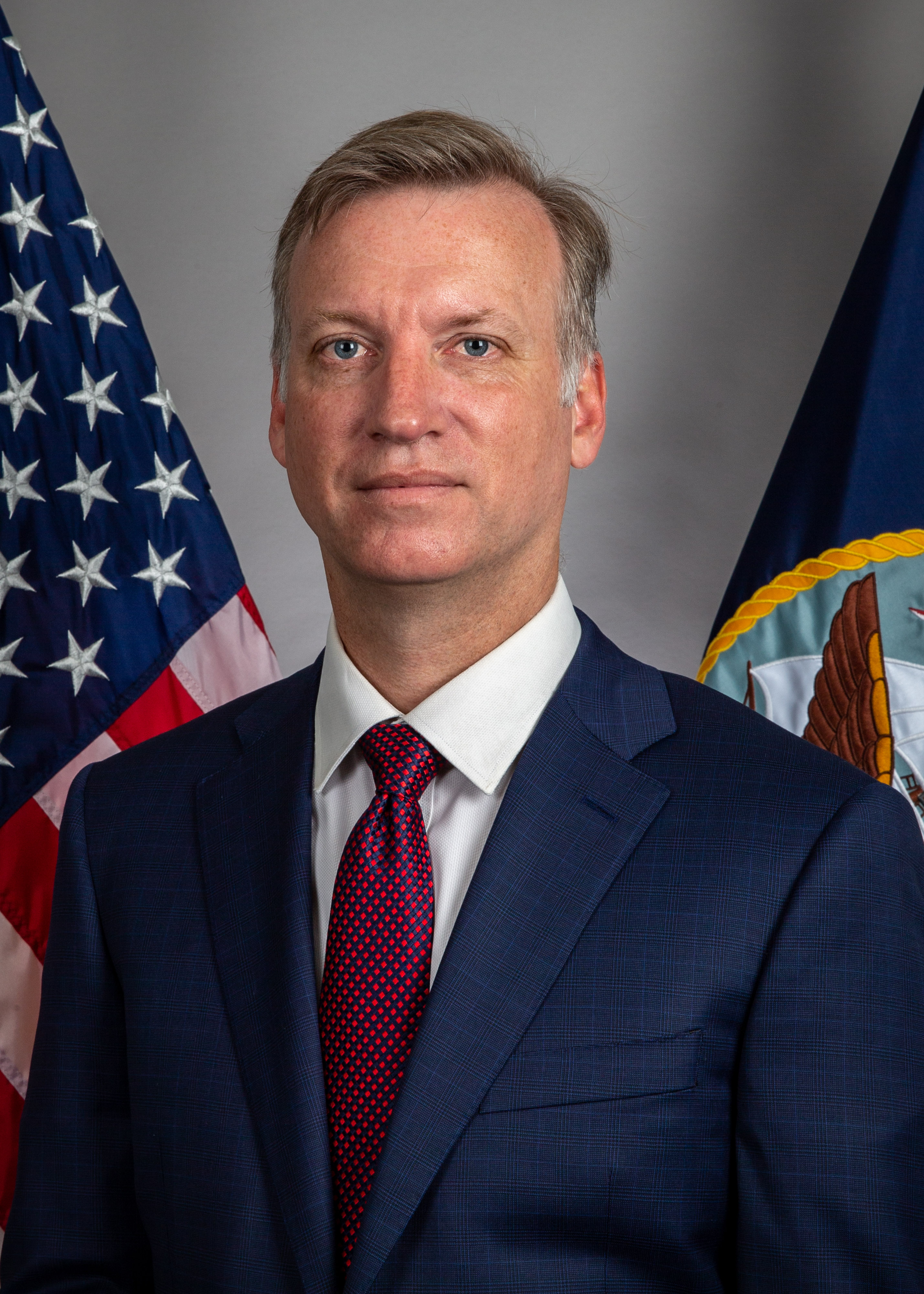
- Official portrait, 2022

34th United States Under Secretary of the Navy
- In office April 13, 2022 – August 1, 2024
- President: Joe Biden
- Preceded by: Thomas Modly
- Succeeded by: Hung Cao

Personal details
- Born: Erik Kristopher Raven
- Education: College of Marin (AA); Connecticut College (BA); London School of Economics (MA)

Erik Kristopher Raven is an American political advisor who served as United States under secretary of the Navy in the Biden administration. He held the post, the second-highest civilian office in the Department of the Navy, from April 2022 to August 2024, after a career on the staffs of Senate Democrats and of the Senate Appropriations Committee.

== Education ==
Raven earned an Associate of Arts degree from the College of Marin, a Bachelor of Arts degree in international relations from Connecticut College, and a Master of Arts degree in international history from the London School of Economics.

== Career ==
Raven began his career as a legislative assistant in the office of Senator Robert Byrd. He later served as Byrd's legislative director and national security advisor. He also worked in the offices of Senators Ted Kennedy and Dianne Feinstein. In 2006, Raven became a professional staffer for the United States Senate Committee on Appropriations. He has since served as majority clerk for the Senate Defense Appropriations Subcommittee. In that post he oversaw, in the White House's description, more than $700 billion a year of spending by the Defense Department and the intelligence community.

=== Biden administration ===
The post had been without a Senate-confirmed holder since Thomas Modly became acting Secretary of the Navy in November 2019, and James Geurts and then Meredith Berger had been performing its duties. On December 13, 2021, President Joe Biden nominated Raven to be the next undersecretary of the Navy. Hearings were held by the Senate Armed Services Committee on his nomination on March 22, 2022. His nomination was favorably reported by the committee on April 5, 2022. Raven was officially confirmed by the entire Senate via voice vote on April 7, 2022. He was sworn in on April 13, 2022. Secretary of the Navy Carlos Del Toro administered the oath at the Pentagon, and Raven became the first under secretary of the Navy confirmed under Biden. As under secretary he was the department's chief operating officer and chief management officer and testified before Congress on the Navy's budget. He resigned in August 2024. Del Toro announced on July 3, 2024, that Raven would step down the following month, and credited him with contributions to the AUKUS partnership, to infrastructure on Guam and to streamlining the department's business operations. A Navy spokesperson said Raven was leaving to pursue other opportunities and to focus on his family. Thomas Mancinelli, the principal deputy for legislative affairs in the Office of the Secretary of Defense, was designated to perform the duties of the office after his departure.

Political offices
Preceded by Meredith Berger; Acting	United States Under Secretary of the Navy; 2022–2024	Succeeded by Thomas Mancinelli; Acting
Order of precedence
Preceded by Gabe Camarillo as Under Secretary of the Army	Order of precedence of the United States as Under Secretary of the Navy	Succeeded by Marcia Bernicat as Director General of the Foreign Service
