= Admiral Moran =

Admiral Moran may refer to:

- Francis D. Moran (born 1935), NOAA Commissioned Officer Corps rear admiral
- Michael T. Moran (born 1962), U.S. Navy vice admiral
- William F. Moran (admiral) (born 1958), U.S. Navy admiral
