= Michael T. Moran =

U.S. Navy admiral

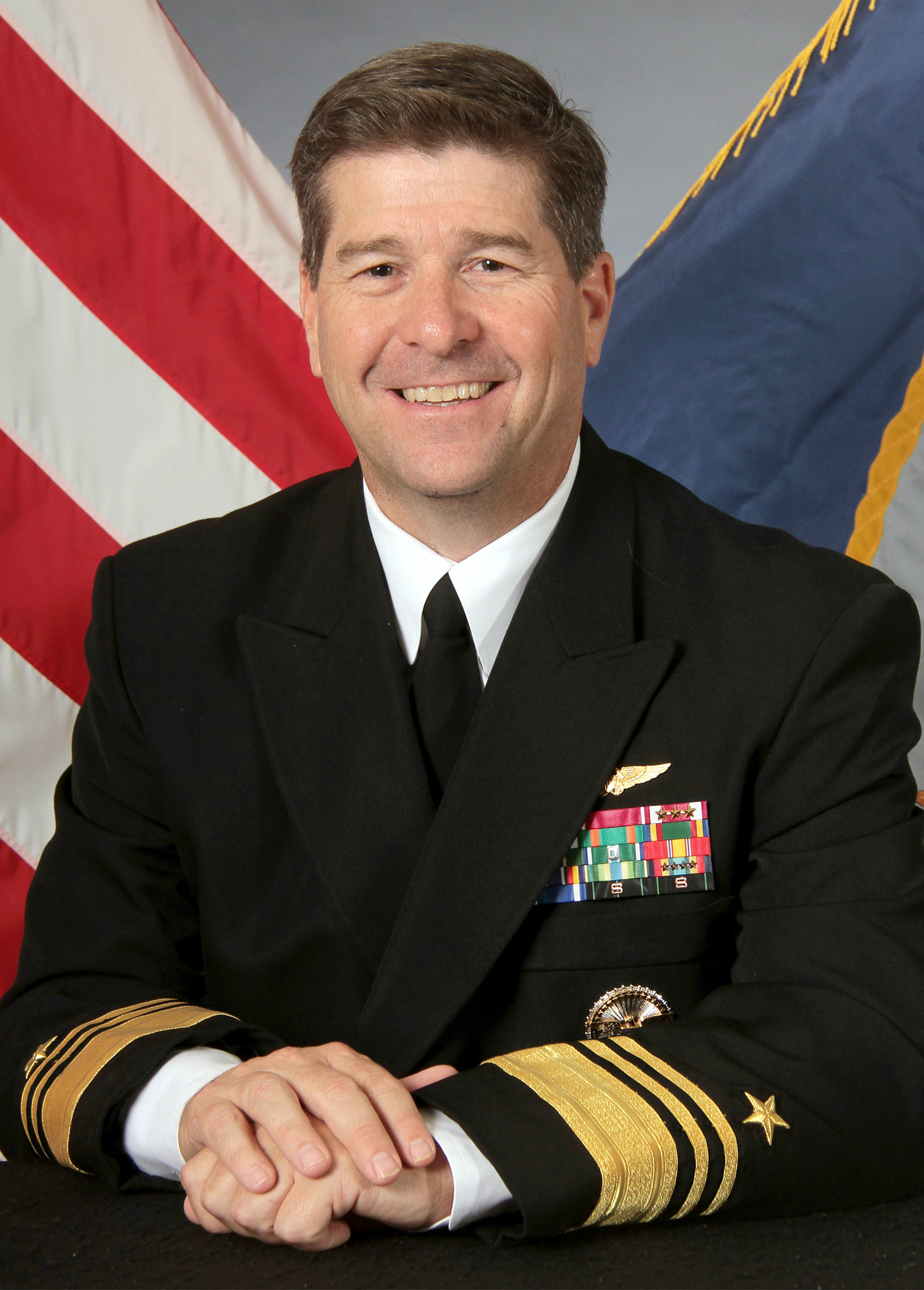
- Born: 1962 (age 63–64)
- Military career
- Allegiance: United States
- Branch: United States Navy
- Service years: 1984–2021
- Rank: Vice Admiral
- Commands: Naval Air Warfare Center Weapons Division
- Awards: Navy Distinguished Service Medal; Defense Superior Service Medal; Legion of Merit

Michael Thomas Moran (born 1962) is a United States Navy vice admiral who most recently served as Principal Military Deputy to the Assistant Secretary of the Navy (Research, Development and Acquisition) from October 12, 2018 to August 4, 2021. He previously served as the Program Executive Officer for Tactical Aircraft Programs. Raised in Walden, New York, Moran is a 1984 graduate of the United States Naval Academy with a B.S. degree in engineering. He was designated a naval flight officer in 1986 and later received an M.S. degree in human resources management from Troy State University.

== Awards and decorations ==
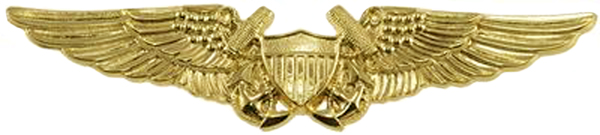

Naval Flight Officer insignia
Navy Distinguished Service Medal
Defense Superior Service Medal	Legion of Merit	Meritorious Service Medal with three gold award stars
Navy and Marine Corps Commendation Medal with two award stars	Navy and Marine Corps Achievement Medal	Navy Unit Commendation
Navy Meritorious Unit Commendation	Coast Guard Meritorious Unit Commendation with "O" device	National Defense Service Medal with one bronze service star
Global War on Terrorism Service Medal	Armed Forces Service Medal	Navy Sea Service Deployment Ribbon with four service stars
NATO Medal for Yugoslavia	Navy Rifle Marksmanship Ribbon with Sharpshooter Device	Navy Pistol Marksmanship Ribbon with Sharpshooter Device
Command at Sea insignia
Office of the Secretary of Defense Identification Badge

Military offices
Preceded by ???	Commander of the Naval Air Warfare Center Weapons Division; 2013–2015	Succeeded by Brian Corey
Preceded by ???	Program Executive Officer for Tactical Aircraft Programs of the United States Navy; 2016–2018	Succeeded by Shane G. Gahagan
Preceded by David C. Johnson	Principal Military Deputy to the Assistant Secretary of the Navy of the Research, Development and Acquisition; 2018–2021	Succeeded by Francis D. Morley
