= William A. Brown (admiral) =

United States Navy officer

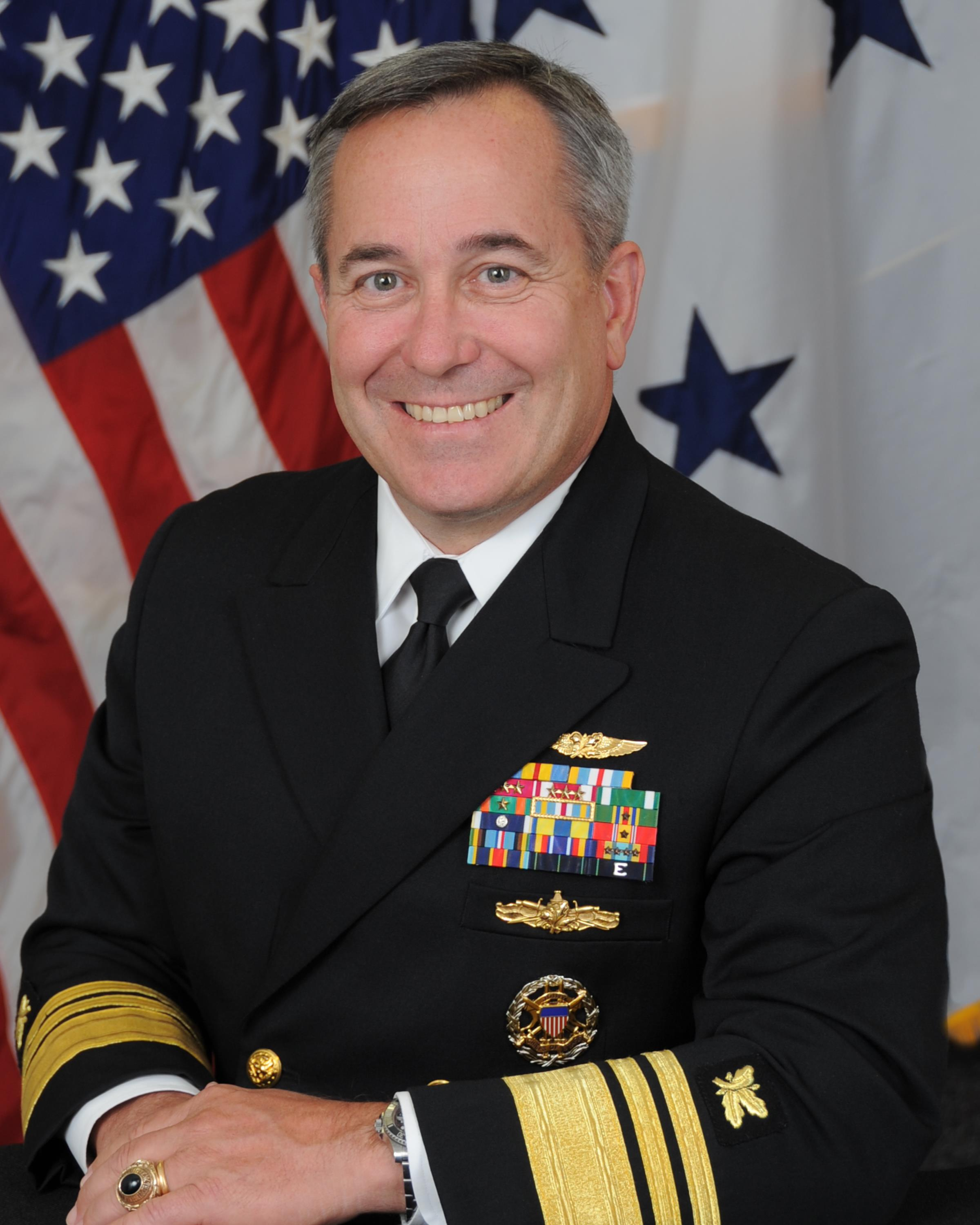
- Born: April 5, 1958 (age 68); Norfolk, Virginia, U.S.
- Military career
- Allegiance: United States
- Branch: United States Navy
- Service years: 1980–2017
- Rank: Vice admiral
- Commands: Director for logistics, J4 Joint Chiefs of Staff

William A. "Andy" Brown (born April 5, 1958) is a retired vice admiral in the United States Navy last serving as the director for logistics, J4 for the Joint Chiefs of Staff. He currently serves as President and CEO of NDTA (National Defense Transportation Association).

Brown previously served as the United States Transportation Command (USTRANSCOM) deputy commander at Scott Air Force Base, Illinois, and USTRANSCOM director of Strategy, Policy, Programs and Logistics (J5/4).

== Early life and education ==
Brown was raised in Gloucester County, Virginia, and attended the Virginia Military Institute as a Naval Reserve Officers Training Corps scholarship student. He graduated from the Institute in 1980 and was commissioned as a Navy ensign in the same year.

Brown went on to receive his master's degree in business administration in 1990 from the Naval Postgraduate School and later attended the Stanford Graduate School of Business Executive Training Program in 2004.

== Assignments ==
In the course of his career he has completed the following assignments:

- June 1980 – December 1980, Student, Navy Supply Corps School, Athens, Georgia
- December 1980 – April 1983, Disbursing Officer, Wardroom Officer, Stock Control Officer, USS John F. Kennedy (CV-67), Norfolk, Virginia
- September 1983 – January 1985, Naval Acquisition Contracting Officer Intern, Naval Air Systems Command, Washington, D.C.
- May 1985 – October 1986, Aide to the Commander, Naval Air Systems Command, Washington, D.C.
- January 1987 – May 1989, Supply Officer, USS Leftwich (DD-984), Pearl Harbor, Hawaii
- May 1989 – December 1990, Student, Naval Post Graduate School, Monterey, California
- December 1990 – November 1993, H-60 Weapons Manager and Contracts Division director, Naval Aviation Supply Office, Philadelphia, Pennsylvania
- November 1993 – November 1996, Carrier Supply Operations Officer, Naval Air Force, U.S. Atlantic Fleet, Norfolk, Virginia
- November 1996 – April 1999, Operations Officer, Naval Supply Systems Command, Mechanicsburg, Pennsylvania.
- April 1999 – March 2001, Supply Officer USS George Washington (CVN-73), Norfolk, Virginia
- March 2001 – April 2003, Operations Director, Naval Inventory Control Point, Philadelphia, Philadelphia
- April 2003 – July 2006, Force Supply Officer, commander, Naval Air Forces, San Diego, California
- August 2006 – July 2008, Director of Ordnance Supply/Fleet Supply Officer U.S. Fleet Forces Command, Norfolk, Virginia
- July 2008 – June 2009, Commander, Fleet and Industrial Supply Centers, San Diego, California
- July 2009 - July 2012, Director of Logistics, US European Command
- July 2012 - August 2015, J5/J4 and Deputy Commander, US Transportation Command
- August 2015 - October 2017, Director of Logistics (J4), Joint Staff

== Awards and decorations ==
Vice Adm. Brown has been awarded the following decorations and awards:

Defense Distinguished Service Medal 2 Awards
Defense Superior Service Medal
Legion of Merit 4 Awards
Meritorious Service Medal 4 Awards
Navy and Marine Corps Commendation Medal
Navy and Marine Corps Achievement Medal 2 Awards

Vice Admiral Brown is a qualified Naval Aviation Supply Corps Officer and Surface Warfare Supply Corps Officer. Admiral Brown is a 1989 recipient of the Navy League's Vice Admiral Robert F. Batchelder Award and a 2017 Distinguished Alumni Award from the Naval Postgraduate School

== Dates of promotion ==
- Ensign May 16, 1980
- Lieutenant (Junior Grade) May 28, 1982
- Lieutenant June 1, 1984
- Lieutenant Commander September 1, 1990
- Commander August 1, 1995
- Captain June 1, 2001
- Rear Admiral (Lower Half) April 1, 2008
- Rear Admiral August 1, 2011
- Vice Admiral October 18, 2013
- Retired from Active Duty 1 November 2017

Military offices
Preceded by Samuel D. Cox	Director of Strategy, Policy, Programs, and Logistics of the United States Transportation Command; 2012–2013	Succeeded by David Baucom
Preceded by Kathleen M. Gainey	Deputy Commander of the United States Transportation Command; 2013–2015	Succeeded by Stephen R. Lyons
Preceded by Robert R. Ruark	Director for Logistics of the Joint Staff; 2015–2017	Succeeded by Stephen R. Lyons
