= David Baucom =

Retired United States Navy Rear Admiral

David Folk Baucom
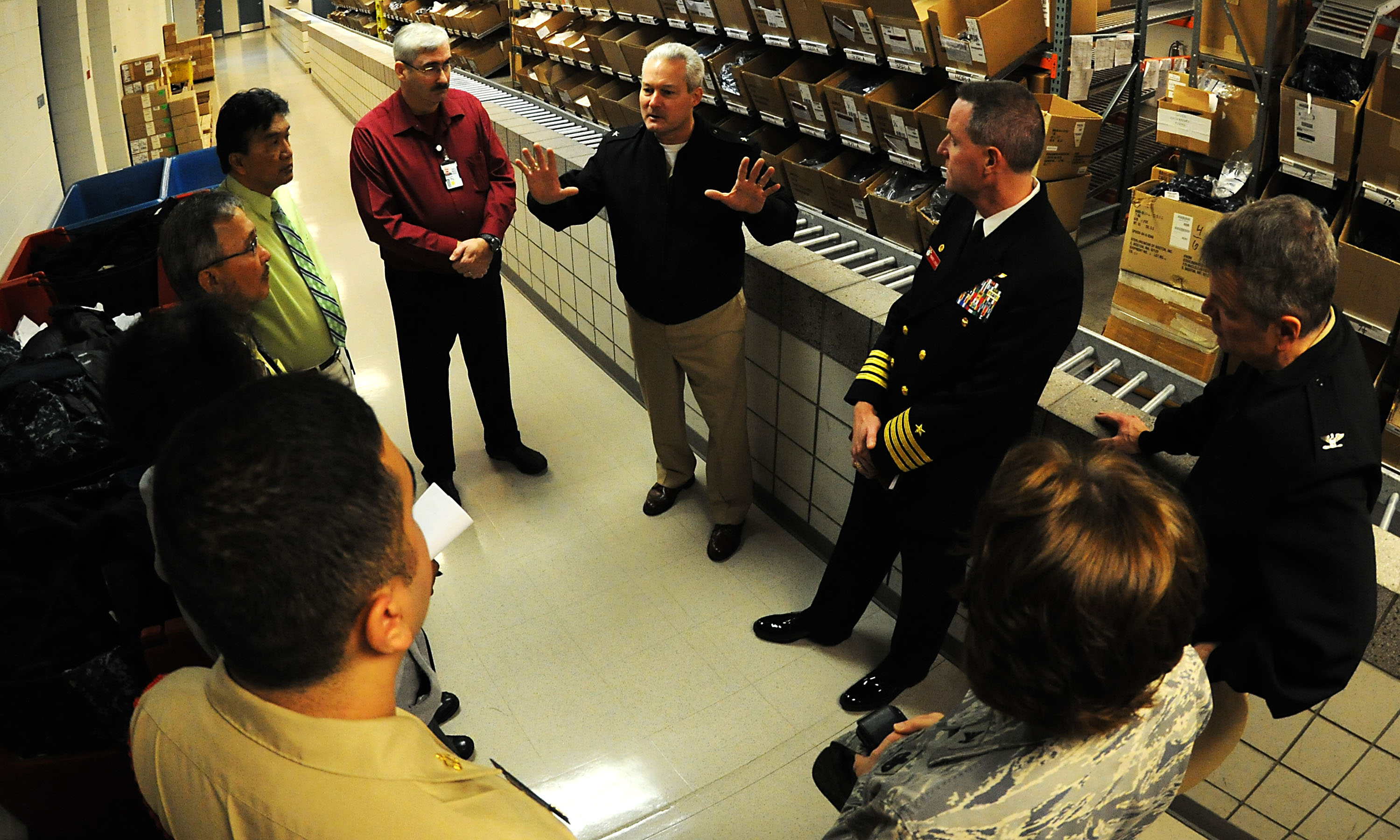
- Baucom (center) talking to Navy personnel
- Born: March 7, 1959 (age 67); Blythewood, South Carolina
- Military career
- Allegiance: United States
- Branch: United States Navy
- Service years: 1980s-2016
- Rank: Rear Admiral
- Awards: Legion of Merit (3); Defense Superior Service Medal (2)

David Folk Baucom (born 7 March 1959) is a retired United States Navy Rear Admiral. Among Baucom's military roles were White House military aide to the president, director of the US Central Command Deployment and Distribution Operations Center in Kuwait, commander of Defense Logistics Agency Troop Support, commander of Fleet & Industrial Supply Center in Norfolk, Virginia, and strategy and policy director of the US Transportation Command. Baucom is currently senior director at Vintun LLC.

== Early life and education ==
David Baucom was born in 1959 to Horace Clifford Baucom, Jr. and Rosalind Windhorn Baucom. A native of Blythewood, South Carolina, Baucom and his two brothers would all later join the United States Navy. Studying personnel and industrial management, he graduated with a bachelor's degree in industrial management from Auburn University in 1981, where he was commissioned into the Navy through the Naval Reserve Officers Training Corps program.

Later he received executive education degrees from the Darden School of Business at the University of Virginia and the University of North Carolina, Kenan-Flagler Business School. His first master's degree in acquisition and contract management was from the Naval Postgraduate School, while his second in national resource strategy was from the Dwight D. Eisenhower School for National Security and Resource Strategy at the National Defense University. He is also a Lean Six Sigma green belt.

== Military career ==
Early in his military career, Baucom's ship assignments included supply officer of the USS Edward McDonnell, stock control officer of the USS Theodore Roosevelt on its maiden voyage, and the first supply officer of the USS Ronald Reagan. He was also assigned to serve as White House military aide to president Ronald Reagan and first lady Nancy Reagan. Baucom worked with Acquisition and Sustainment for the Joint Staff from 1998 until 2000, and in 2003 he became director for logistics transformation with the NATO Supreme Allied Command Transformation. He held the role for three years. From August 2006 until July 2008 he was commanding officer of the Fleet and Industrial Supply Center in Norfolk, Virginia, while other roles have included director of contracting at the Fleet and Industrial Supply Center of Yokosuka, Japan and executive assistant to the deputy commander for logistics at Naval Supply Systems Command. For Headquarters, Supreme Allied Command Transformation, he was also the first deputy chief of staff for logistics.

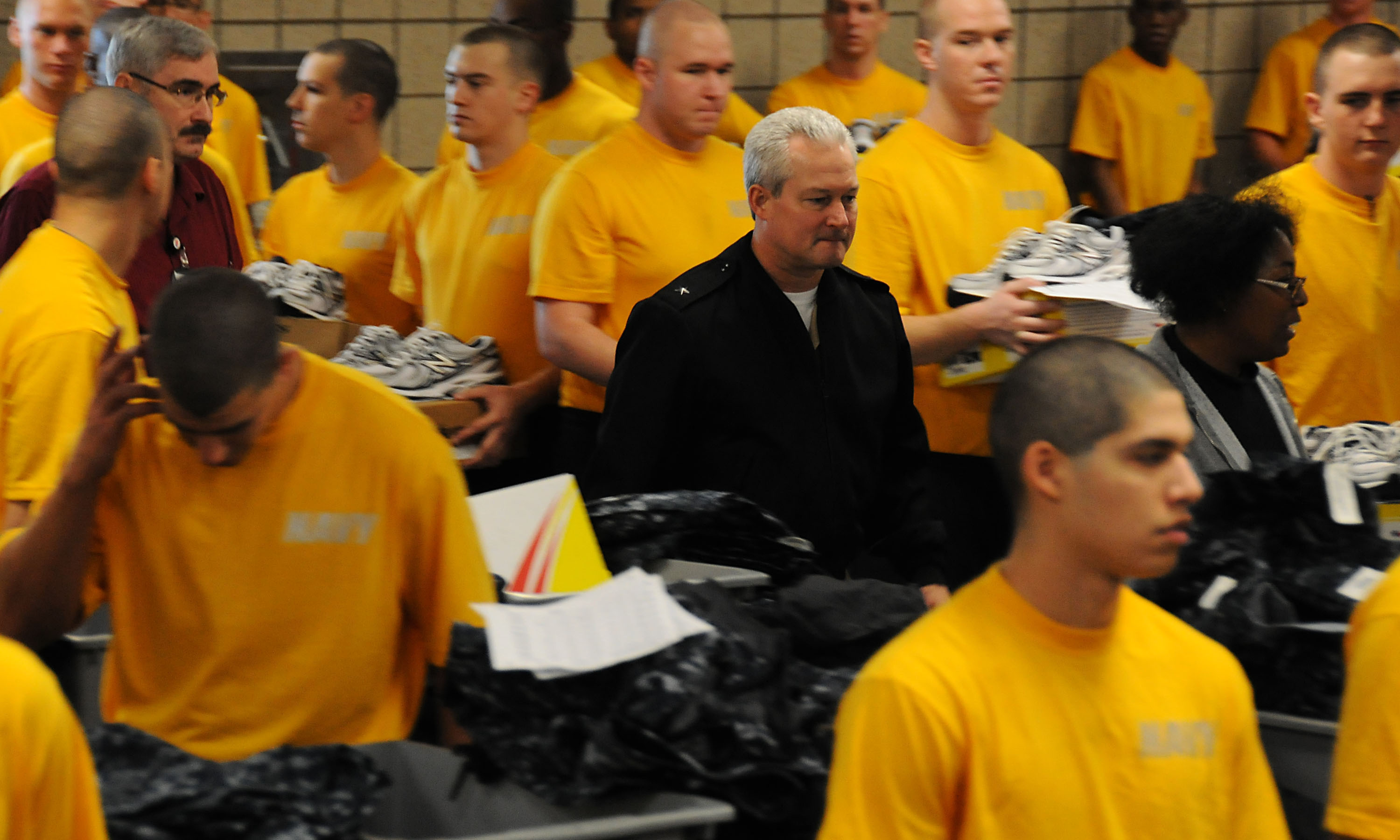
Baucom (in black) tours the United States Navy's uniform department at Great Lakes, Illinois.

Baucom was promoted to rear admiral on May 1, 2009. At the time he served as both assistant deputy chief of staff for fleet readiness & training and fleet supply officer for the US Fleet Forces Command, roles he held from July 2008 until September 2009. He was Deputy Assistant Secretary of the Navy for Acquisition and Logistics Management in Washington D.C. from September 2009 until August 2011 with oversight for acquisition and logistics in the Navy and Marine Corps.

He was the commander of Defense Logistics Agency Troop Support in Philadelphia from July 13, 2011 until August 2012. In support of Operation Enduring Freedom, from August 2012 until January 2013 he was director of the United States Central Command Deployment and Distribution Operations Center in Kuwait. Maintaining his command of DLA Troop Support during this time, he afterwards returned to commanding DLA Troop Support until October 2013. He joined the US Transportation Command (USTRANSCOM) in October 2013 as director, with roles in strategy, capabilities, policy and logistics. USTRANSCOM relieved Baucom of his position in October 2015, citing disorderly conduct. Baucom was assigned to Fleet Forces Command at The Pentagon on November 4, 2015, and in December 2015 he became the special assistant to the director for material readiness & logistics in the office of the Chief of Naval Operations. He retired in October 2016.

== Business career ==
Baucom joined the information services and management consulting firm of Vintun LLC in October 2016, where he assumed the post of senior director. He holds memberships in the Military Officers Association of America, the National Defense Transportation Association, and the National Contract Management Association.

== Awards and recognition ==
- Defense Superior Service Medal with bronze oak leaf cluster - for "superior service to the US Department of Defense"
- Legion of Merit with two Gold Stars - for "exceptionally meritorious conduct"

== Personal life ==
Baucom is a resident of Alexandria, Virginia. In years prior, Baucom lived in locales such as Norfolk, Virginia and Yokosuka, Japan.

== See also ==
- Deputy Assistant Secretary of the Navy (Acquisition and Procurement)
- Rear admiral (United States)

Military offices
Preceded by William A. Brown	Director of Strategy, Policy, Programs, and Logistics of the United States Transportation Command; 2013–2015	Succeeded by Lawrence B. Jackson
