= Deputy assistant secretary =

Title borne by government executives

Deputy assistant secretary is a title borne by government executives in certain countries, usually senior officials assigned to a specific assistant secretary.

== United States ==
In the United States, the rank of deputy assistant secretary generally sits below that of assistant secretary. The rank of deputy assistant secretary appeared in the federal government no later than 1952. In 1960, a rank of principal deputy assistant secretary — sitting between assistant secretary and deputy assistant secretary — was created in the U.S. Department of Defense. This rank had spread to seven cabinet departments by 1998. During the presidency of Bill Clinton, this rank had further expanded with the creation of the rank of associate principal deputy assistant secretary.

According to Robert D. Kaplan, writing in 2020, there are "hundreds" of deputy assistant secretaries spread across the U.S. Government. The U.S. Department of Veterans Affairs is alone authorized 19 deputy assistant secretaries.

Career deputy assistant secretaries are drawn from the Senior Executive Service and are generally appointed by the secretary who heads the department. Non-career deputy assistant secretaries are political appointees designated by the President of the United States and are assigned to a specific department.

== See also ==
- Assistant secretary
- Cabinet secretary
- Undersecretary
