= John S. Thackrah =

American naval administrator

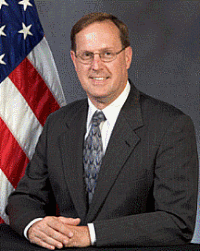
John S. Thackrah

John S. Thackrah was United States Assistant Secretary of the Navy (Research, Development and Acquisitions) in 2007–2008.

== Biography ==
Thackrah attended the University of Delaware, where he received a bachelor's degree in mechanical engineering and aerospace engineering. He received an M.B.A. from Rensselaer Polytechnic Institute.

In 1979, Thackrah joined United Technologies Corporation's Pratt & Whitney Division, where he worked in project and test engineering. He later worked in program management and model management and commercial flight test activities. He then became president of a Pratt & Whitney joint venture. Thackrah later went on to serve in a series of executive positions, culminating in vice president of commercial products. He then became vice president of UTC's Otis Elevator Company division, later returning to Pratt & Whitney as vice president of aftermarket services, and later serving as vice president and general manager of one of its strategic business units.

On April 18, 2005, Thackrah was sworn in as Deputy Assistant Secretary for Management and Budget of the United States Department of the Navy. In this capacity, he was responsible for all of the department's administrative matters, annual budget preparation, and human resource management, and served as chief of staff for the Assistant Secretary of the Navy (Research, Development and Acquisitions), who was John J. Young Jr. followed by Delores M. Etter.

In 2007, President of the United States George W. Bush nominated Thackrah as Assistant Secretary of the Navy (Research, Development and Acquisitions) and he subsequently held this office from November 16, 2007, until July 27, 2008. In that capacity, he was responsible for $50 billion annually of research, development and acquisition activities, and the management of over 100,000 people.

On December 8, 2008, he became Principal Deputy of the Navy's Strategic Systems Programs.

On April 4, 2017, Thackrah returned to Pratt & Whitney as vice president of Washington operations.

Government offices
| Preceded by Delores M. Etter | Assistant Secretary of the Navy (Research, Development and Acquisitions); November 16, 2007 – July 27, 2008 | Succeeded by Sean Stackley |
