= Thomas Mancinelli =

Acting United States Under Secretary of the Navy (2024–2025)

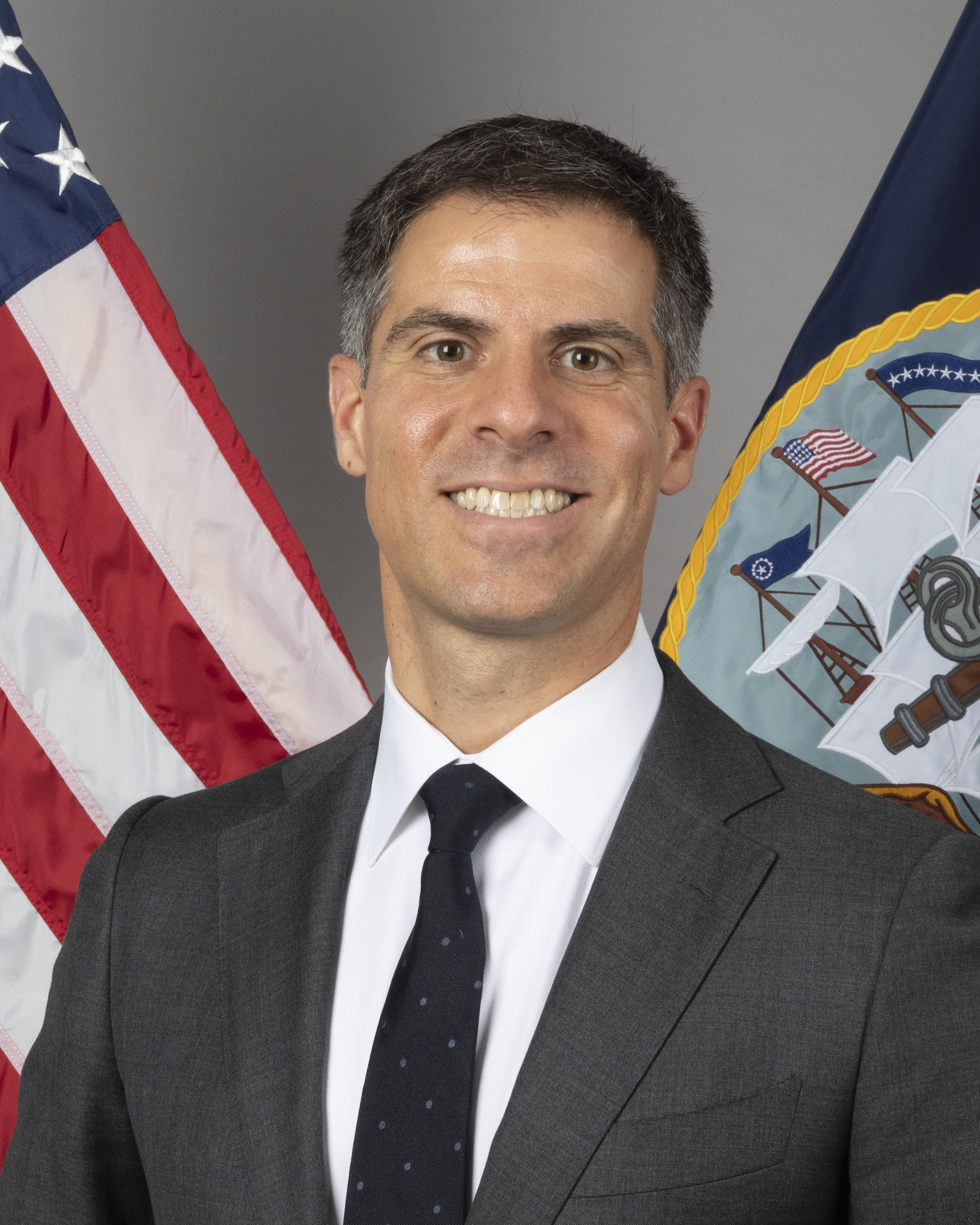
- Official portrait, 2024

Acting United States Under Secretary of the Navy
- In office August 20, 2024 – January 20, 2025
- President: Joe Biden
- Preceded by: Erik Raven
- Succeeded by: Victor Minella (acting)

Personal details
- Spouse: Sarah Mancinelli
- Children: 2

Military service
- Allegiance: United States
- Branch/service: United States Marine Corps
- Battles/wars: Iraq War; Anbar campaign

Thomas J. Mancinelli is an American naval officer and politician who served as the acting United States Under Secretary of the Navy from 2024 to 2025 as part of the Biden administration. He served in the United States Marine Corps, being deployed to fight in the Anbar campaign during the Iraq War on two occasions.

== Personal life ==
Thomas Mancinelli lives in Washington, D.C., with his wife, Sarah, and his two children.

== Career ==
Mancinelli serves as the head of strategy & policy at Antares, a Los Angeles startup that manufactures nuclear microreactors for defense and space applications. He and his CEO have argued that nuclear energy is critical to American space exploration and unlocking the celestial economy.

Political offices
Preceded by Erik Raven	United States Under Secretary of the Navy; Acting; 2024–2025	Succeeded by Victor Minella; Acting
