= Meredith Berger =

American government official

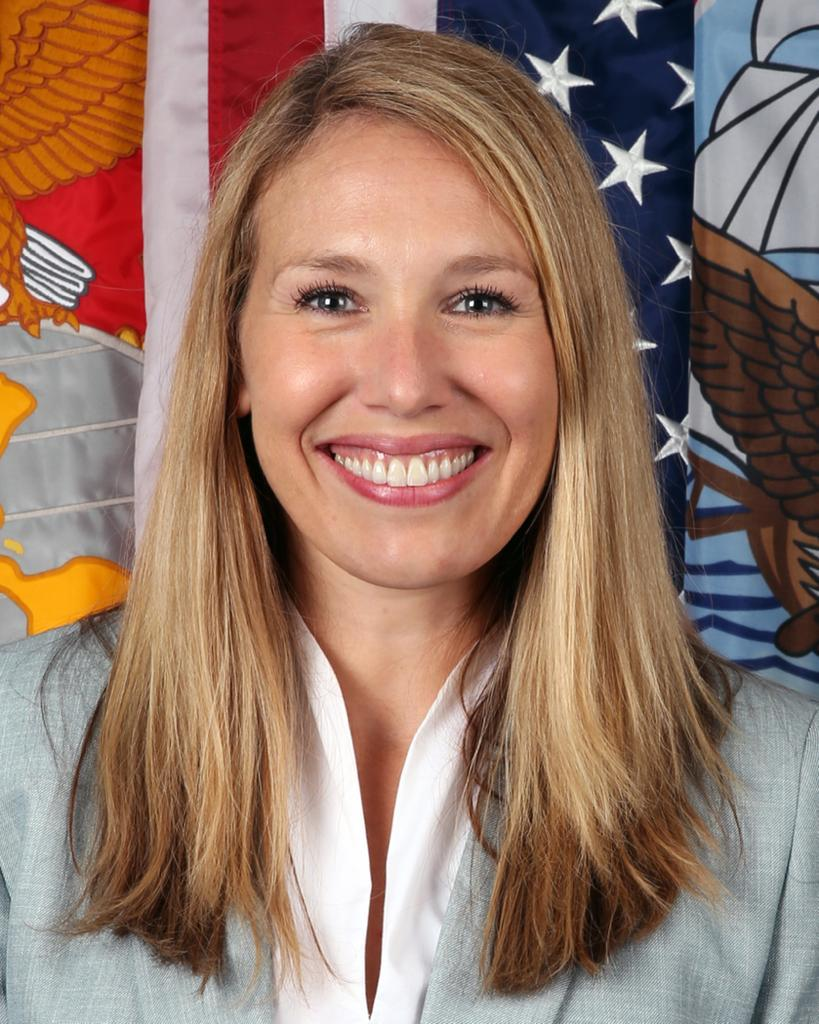
- Official portrait, 2022

United States Assistant Secretary of the Navy for Energy, Installations and Environment
- In office August 5, 2021 – January 20, 2025
- President: Joe Biden
- Preceded by: Charles A. Williams
- Succeeded by: Brendan Rogers

Performing the Duties of United States Under Secretary of the Navy
- In office August 25, 2021 – April 13, 2022
- President: Joe Biden
- Preceded by: James Geurts (acting)
- Succeeded by: Erik Raven

Personal details
- Education: Vanderbilt University (BA); Nova Southeastern University (JD); Harvard University (MPA)
- Awards: Navy Distinguished Civilian Service Award; Secretary of Defense Medal for Outstanding Public Service

Meredith Ashley Berger is an American government official who had served as the United States Assistant Secretary of the Navy for Energy, Installations, and Environment. From August 25, 2021, until April 13, 2022, she concurrently served as the designated official performing the duties of the United States Under Secretary of the Navy.

== Education ==
Berger holds a Bachelor of Arts in American Studies and Spanish from Vanderbilt University; a Juris Doctor from Nova Southeastern University; and a Master of Public Administration from the Harvard Kennedy School.

== Public service career ==
Berger began her career in public service at the state of Florida Chief Financial Officer's office where she developed and executed state policies on climate, insurance, risk, energy, public finance, and housing. She previously served for two years at the Pentagon as a Defense Fellow, providing support to key offices in the Department of Defense. She joined the Obama administration in 2011, serving as the policy advisor at the Environmental Protection Agency where she worked on the Presidential Task Force focused on the long-term recovery of the Gulf of Mexico and surrounding areas following the Deepwater Horizon oil spill. She then served as the Deputy Chief of Staff for the United States Department of the Navy during the Obama administration, where she advised the Secretary of the Navy on the formulation, prioritization, and execution of Department-wide strategy, policies, plans, and standards.

== Professional career ==
She worked at Microsoft with the Defending Democracy Program where she works to protect democratic processes, people, and institutions from cyber-enabled interference while advancing norms of responsible behavior in cyberspace. She has been a non-resident Fellow at the Belfer Center for Science and International Affairs at the Harvard Kennedy School.

=== Assistant Secretary of the Navy ===
On April 23, 2021, President Joe Biden announced Berger as his nominee to be the United States Assistant Secretary of the Navy for Installations and Environment. On April 28, 2021, her nomination was sent to the United States Senate.

On July 22, 2021, Berger was confirmed by the Senate by unanimous consent as Assistant Secretary of the Navy for Installations and Environment. She was sworn into office on August 5, 2021.

== Awards and recognition ==
Berger is the recipient of the Secretary of the Navy Distinguished Civilian Service Award, the Secretary of Defense Medal for Outstanding Public Service, and the Environmental Protection Agency Gold Medal for Exceptional Service. She is the sponsor of the USS Fort Lauderdale (LPD-28).

Government offices
Preceded by Todd L. Schafer; Acting	United States Assistant Secretary of the Navy for Installations and Environment; 2021–2025	Succeeded by Peter S. Lynch
Political offices
Preceded by James Geurts; Acting	United States Under Secretary of the Navy; Acting; 2021–2022	Succeeded by Erik Raven
Order of precedence
Preceded by Steven D. Poulin as Vice Commandant of the Coast Guard	Order of precedence of the United States as Assistant Secretary of the Navy (Energy, Installations and Environment)	Succeeded by Caral Spangler as Assistant Secretary of the Army (Financial Management and Comptroller)
