= Pacific Missile Test Center =

Californian naal proving ground

Coordinates: 34.115°N 119.107°W

Pacific Missile Test Center (PMTC) is the former name of the current Naval Air Warfare Center, Weapons Division. The name of the center was the Naval Air Missile Test Center prior to PMTC. It is located at Naval Base Ventura County/Naval Air Station Point Mugu in Ventura County, California. The nearest city to the installation is Oxnard.

The Naval Air Warfare Center consists of both the NAS Point Mugu airfield and a rocket launching site for the U.S. Navy. The center has been an active development and test facility for the Navy since the late 1940s. Among the missiles developed and tested there include the Sparrow family and the Phoenix, and AMRAAM air-to-air missiles and the Regulus surface-to-surface missile in addition to numerous prototypes of military rockets and sounding rockets.

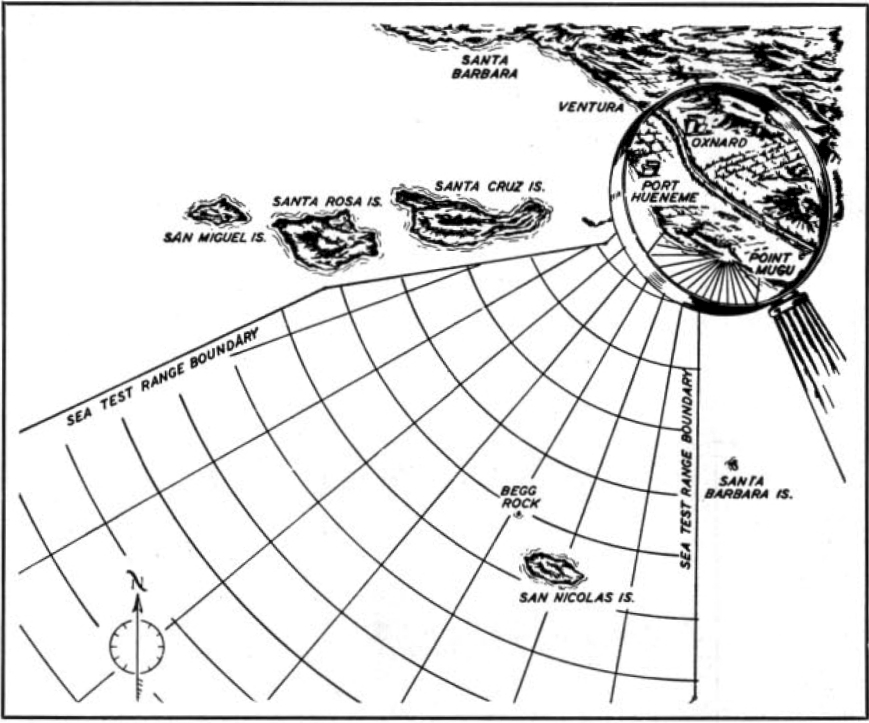
Map of the range

== History ==
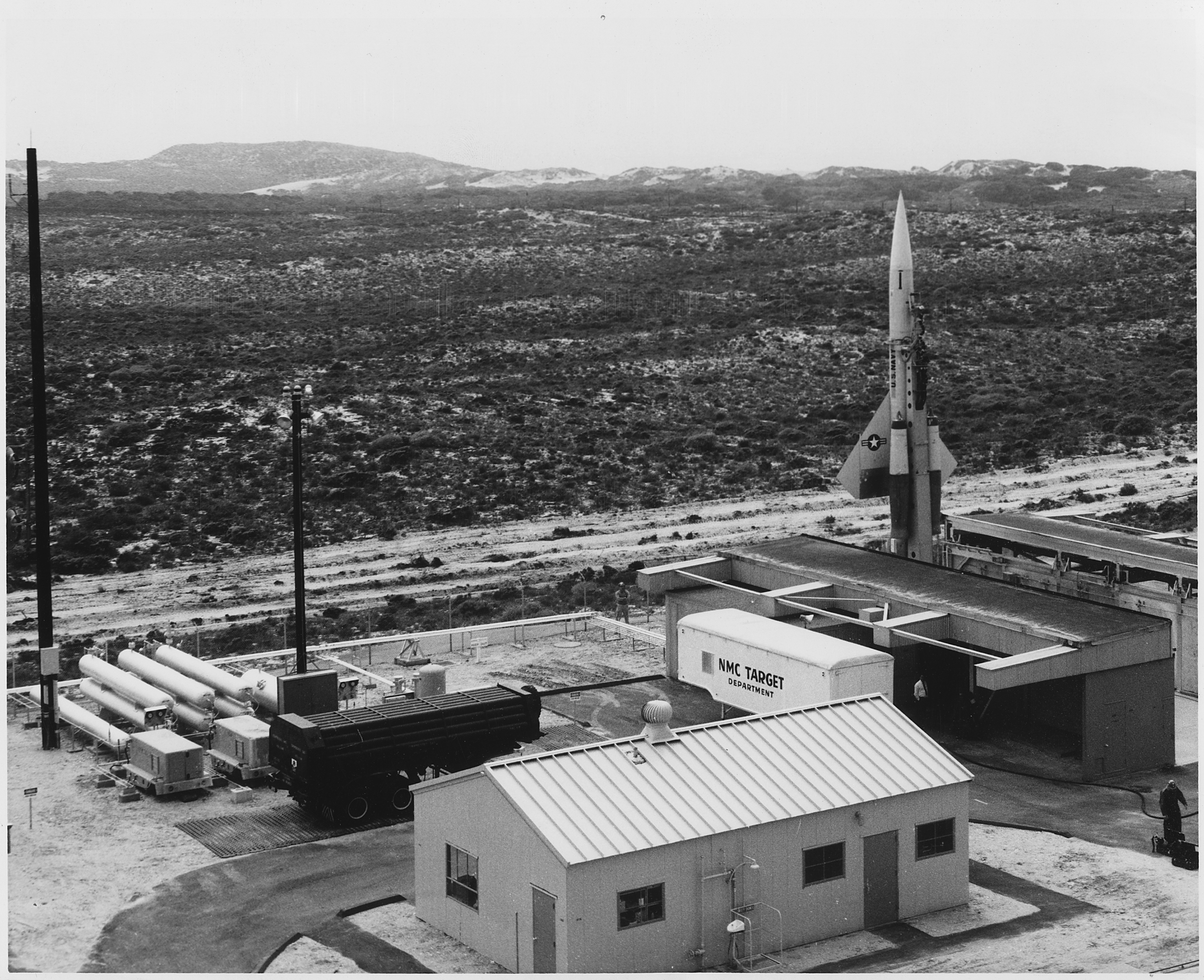
One CIM-10 Bomarc.

It was originally built for anti-aircraft training during World War II. The base later shifted from traditional anti-aircraft munitions training to become a test center for anti-aircraft missiles. Most of the missiles developed during the 1950s and 1960s were designed and tested at the base. This includes the AIM-7 Sparrow, AIM-54 Phoenix, SSM-N-8 Regulus and the AGM-12 Bullpup.

== Facilities ==
=== Naval Air Station Point Mugu ===
This base is where most of the aircraft are launched for testing on the range. It is home to the test squadron and also other groups including the Air National Guard. This was also the airfield that US President Ronald Reagan flew into when he came to visit his ranch in Santa Barbara.

=== Naval Base Ventura County ===
NBVC supports approximately 80 tenant commands with a base population of more than 19,000 personnel. Tenant commands encompass an extremely diverse set of specialties that support both Fleet and Fighter, including three warfare centers: Naval Air Warfare Center Weapons Division, Naval Surface Warfare Center Port Hueneme Division and Naval Facilities Engineering and Expeditionary Warfare Center. NBVC is also home to deployable units, including the Pacific Seabees and the West Coast E-2C Hawkeyes. Additionally, the base is home to the construction battalions that are used to create targets and facilities for the range. The Island of San Nicolas was transferred from the Naval Air Warfare Center to the base in 2004.

== VX-30 - Bloodhounds ==
VX-30 uses the aircraft to launch and track munitions for the range. VX-30 have used the F-4 Phantom (retired), F-14 (retired), F-18 (retired), S-3 Viking (retired), P3 Orion (active) and C-130s (active). This squadron is dedicated to this range and can be used for tracking and acquisition of targets also. VX-30 has conducted missions not only in the range but the Reagan Test Site in Kwajalein, Marshall Islands, to the waters off the Florida coast, supporting the Missile Defense Agency And the National Aeronautics And Space Administration. The squadron is also testing and evaluation for the US Navy.

== Targets ==
- The US Naval self defence ship is owned by the US Navy and is the refurbished USS Paul F. Foster (DD-964). This ship is a remote controlled, fully functioning ship. Being unmanned it avoids safety constraints, meaning it can be a weapons test platform for live missiles. Testing features an anti-missile platform on the ship and towing a decoy. The missile will be aimed at the decoy and the ship will try and defend the decoy. Tested weapons include the MK 57 Sea Sparrow, Rolling Airframe Missile, AN/SLQ-32 ESM and the Phalanx CIWS.

=== Aerial targets ===
The range offers both Supersonic and Subsonic targets. This includes both BQM-74E, BQM-34S, AQM-37C, GQM-163A, QRQ-2B Flycatcher. These are used for anti-Aircraft testing and is launched from Naval Air Station Point Mugu and also from San Nicolas Island. These can be used to simulate enemy targets and are capable of emitting different radar cross section to simulate different aircraft. They also offer the QF-4 Phantom II for testing and evaluation of live and dummy missiles.

=== Sea targets ===
The range also offers smaller boats for testing and evaluation of weapons. These are all remote controlled so that live weapons can be used. The range offers the HSMST, QST, FACT, and MST. These are capable of testing weapons that are air launched and also ones from land.

=== San Nicolas Island ===
The island is used as live munitions testing range. It supplies a realistic marine environment, Remote and Fixed telemetry sites, 50,000 pound missile rail( located at 33.264278,-119.539), target launcher, Inert Missile impact area, 10,000 foot airfield for C-5 and C-17 and dedicated ordnance and range staff. This gives them the ability to launch and control a wide variety of missiles, aerial and surface targets from a controlled secluded island. It was also one of the 8 candidates for the first detonation of the atomic bomb before White Sands Proving ground was selected for it. During WW2 there were stationed aircraft on the island Including J4F Widgeon Amphibians and TBF Avengers. In 1946 the Island became strictly used as an auxiliary landing field for the island. The island is now used for mostly target acquisition and live training for the US navy. They have continued to upgrade the island with new telemetry radar facilities.

=== Electronic targets ===
The range is capable of simulated GPS, radar and Active Denial Systems for weapons-survivability testing. This is used for testing of anti-radar and anti-GPS targets.

== Amateur radio restrictions ==
The US Code of Federal Regulations specifies that amateur radio operators within 322 kilometers of PMTC must not transmit with more than 50 watts of power on the 70-centimeter band.
