= Assistant Secretary of the Navy (Research, Development and Acquisition) =

Senior civilian official within the U.S. Department of the Navy

Assistant Secretary of the Navy for Research, Development and Acquisition
- Seal of the Department of the Navy

- Incumbent; William Mahan; Acting since May 26, 2026
- Style: Mr. Secretary; The Honorable (formal address in writing)
- Reports to: Secretary of the Navy; Under Secretary of the Navy
- Seat: The Pentagon, Arlington County, Virginia, United States
- Nominator: The president with Senate advice and consent
- Term length: No fixed term
- Constituting instrument: 10. U.S.C. § 8016
- Formation: March 1990
- First holder: Gerald A. Cann
- Succession: 18th in SecDef succession by seniority of appointment
- Salary: Executive Schedule, Level IV
- Website: Official website

Assistant Secretary of the Navy (Research, Development and Acquisition) (abbreviated ASN (RDA)) is a civilian office of the United States Department of the Navy. The assistant secretary of the Navy (research, development and acquisition) requires Senate confirmation, and engages in duties as directed by the secretary of the Navy.

The office was created in 1990 by merging the duties of the assistant secretaries of the Navy for shipbuilding and logistics and research, engineering and systems. The assistant secretary of the Navy (research, development and acquisition) is responsible for all of the acquisition functions and programs for the United States Navy and the United States Marine Corps, subject to the guidelines propounded by the under secretary of defense for acquisition and sustainment. The assistant secretary of the Navy (research, development and acquisition) is also in charge of the Office of Naval Research.

== Organization ==
- Principal Military Deputy (Research, Development and Acquisition)
- Principal Civilian Deputy (Research, Development and Acquisition)
- Deputy Assistant Secretaries of the Navy
  - Deputy Assistant Secretary of the Navy (Acquisition and Procurement) – DASN P
  - Deputy Assistant Secretary of the Navy (Air) – DASN Air
  - Deputy Assistant Secretary of the Navy (C4I and Space) – DASN C4I & Space
  - Deputy Assistant Secretary of the Navy (Expeditionary Programs and Logistics Management) – DASN ELM
  - Deputy Assistant Secretary of the Navy (International Programs) – DASN NIPO
  - Deputy Assistant Secretary of the Navy (Management and Budget) – DASN M&B
  - Deputy Assistant Secretary of the Navy (Research, Development, Test & Evaluation) – DASN RDT&E
  - Deputy Assistant Secretary of the Navy (Ships) – DASN Ships
- Assistant General Counsel of the Navy (Research, Development and Acquisitions)
- SYSCOM Commanders
  - Marine Corps Systems Command – MARCOR SYSCOM
  - Naval Air Systems Command – NAVAIR
  - Naval Facilities Engineering Command – NAVFAC
  - Naval Sea Systems Command – NAVSEA
  - Naval Supply Systems Command – NAVSUP
  - Office of Naval Research – ONR
  - Naval Information Warfare Systems Command – NAVWAR
- Program Executive Officers – PEOs
  - PEO for the Joint Strike Fighter – PEO(JSF)
  - PEO for Digital and Enterprise Services – PEO Digital
  - PEO for Manpower, Logistics, and Business Solutions – PEO MLB
  - PEO for C4I – PEO C4I
  - PEO for Space Systems – PEO Space
  - PEO for Littoral Combat Ships – PEO LCS
  - PEO for Unmanned Aviation and Strike Weapons – PEO(UASW)
  - PEO for Integrated Warfare Systems – PEO IWS
  - Direct Reporting Program Manager for the Strategic Systems Program – DRPM SSP
  - PEO for Submarines – PEO Subs
  - PEO for Aircraft Carriers – PEO Carriers
  - PEO for Ships – PEO Ships
  - PEO for the Air ASW Assault, and Special Mission Programs – PEO(A)
  - PEO for Tactical Air Programs – PEO(T)
  - PEO for Land Systems – PEO Land

== Assistant secretaries of the Navy (research, development and acquisitions), 1990—present ==
Image	Name	Assumed office	Left office	President appointed by	Secretary served under
	Gerald A. Cann	March 1990	January 20, 1993	George H. W. Bush	Henry L. Garrett III, Sean O'Keefe
	Nora Slatkin	October 22, 1993	May 16, 1995	Bill Clinton	John Howard Dalton
	John W. Douglass	November 1995	August 1998	Bill Clinton	John Howard Dalton
	H. Lee Buchanan III	October 2, 1998	January 20, 2001	Bill Clinton	Richard Danzig
	Paul A. Schneider (acting)	January 21, 2001	July 16, 2001	George W. Bush	Gordon R. England
	John J. Young, Jr.	July 17, 2001	November 6, 2005	George W. Bush	Gordon R. England
	Delores M. Etter	November 7, 2005	November 15, 2007	George W. Bush	Gordon R. England
	John S. Thackrah (acting)	November 16, 2007	July 27, 2008	George W. Bush	Donald C. Winter
	Sean Stackley	July 28, 2008	August 3, 2017	George W. Bush	Donald C. Winter
	Allison Stiller (acting)	August 4, 2017	December 5, 2017	Donald Trump	Richard V. Spencer
	James Geurts	December 5, 2017	January 20, 2021	Donald Trump	Richard V. Spencer
	Frederick J. Stefany (acting)	January 20, 2021	December 20, 2023	Joe Biden	Thomas Harker (acting), Carlos Del Toro
	Nickolas Guertin	December 20, 2023	January 20, 2025	Joe Biden	Carlos Del Toro
	Brett A. Seidle (acting)	January 20, 2025	July 16, 2025	Donald Trump	Terence G. Emmert (acting); John Phelan
	Jason L. Potter (acting)	July 16, 2025	May 26, 2026	Donald Trump	John Phelan; Hung Cao (acting)
	William Mahan (acting)	May 26, 2026	Present	Donald Trump	Hung Cao (acting)
