= Delores M. Etter =

American scientist and politician

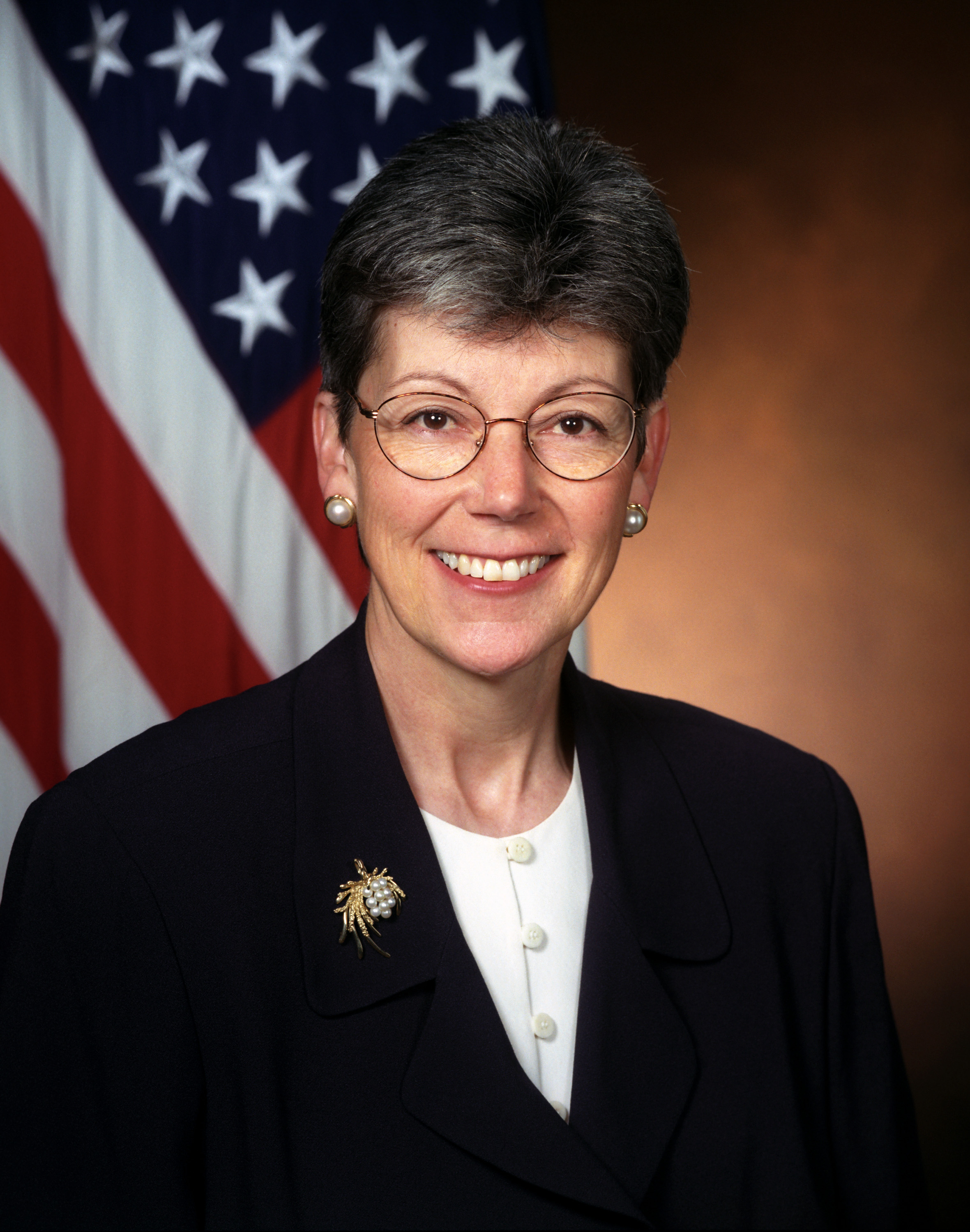
- Born: Delores Maria Van Camp; September 25, 1947 (age 79)

Delores Maria Etter (née Van Camp; September 25, 1947, in Denver, Colorado) is a former United States Deputy Under Secretary of Defense for Science and Technology from 1998 to 2001 and former Assistant Secretary of the Navy for research, science, and technology from 2005 to 2007.

== Education ==
Delores M. Etter attended the Oklahoma State University–Stillwater and the University of Texas at Arlington before going on to receive two degrees from Wright State University (B.S. in Mathematics, 1970; M.S. in Mathematics, 1972). She attended grad school at the University of New Mexico, receiving her Ph.D. in Electrical Engineering in 1979.

== Academic career ==
Upon receiving her Ph.D., Etter joined the faculty of the University of New Mexico's Department of Electrical and Computer Engineering. As a professor, Etter's research interests focused on adaptive signal processing; speech recognition; digital filter design; engineering education and software engineering. She would ultimately author several well-known textbooks on software engineering and computer languages. While a faculty member at the University of New Mexico, she served as Associate Chair of her department 1987–1989, and as the university's associate vice president for academic affairs in 1989. She also spent two summers working at Sandia National Laboratories (where her work focused on seismic signal processing) and was the National Science Foundation Visiting Professor in the Electrical Engineering Department at Stanford University for the 1983–84 academic year. A member of the Institute of Electrical and Electronics Engineers, Etter served as president of the IEEE Acoustics, Speech, and Signal Processing Society from 1988 to 1989, and was editor-in-chief of the IEEE Transactions on Signal Processing from 1993 to 1995.

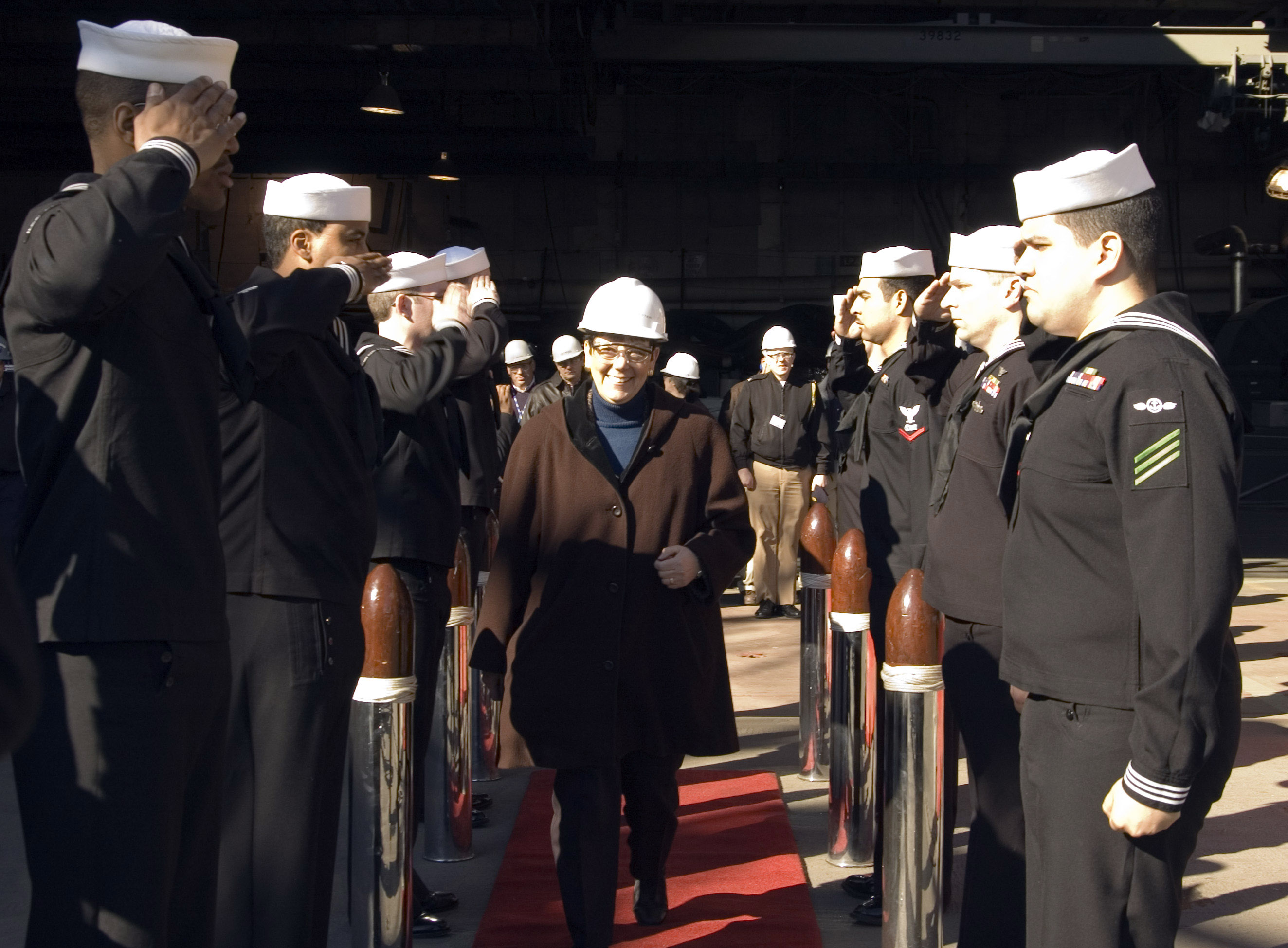
Sailors on board the USS Carl Vinson (CVN-70) saluting Delores Etter, January 26, 2007.

In 1990, Etter left New Mexico to become professor of electrical and computer engineering at the University of Colorado at Boulder. In 1991, while still a professor at the University of Colorado, Etter became a member of the Naval Research Advisory Committee, and would go on to chair that committee 1995–97.

== Naval service ==
Etter left the University of Colorado at Boulder in 1997 after President of the United States Bill Clinton nominated her as Deputy Under Secretary of Defense for Science and Technology, a post she held from June 1998 through July 2001. In this capacity, she was responsible for American Defense Science and Technology strategic planning, budget allocation, and program execution and evaluation for the United States Department of Defense Science and Technology Program. She was the principal U.S. representative to the NATO Research and Technology Organisation's Research and Technology Board and also oversaw the Defense Modeling and Simulation Office, the High Performance Computing Modernization Office, the Software Engineering Institute, and the Department of Defense's high-energy laser research program.

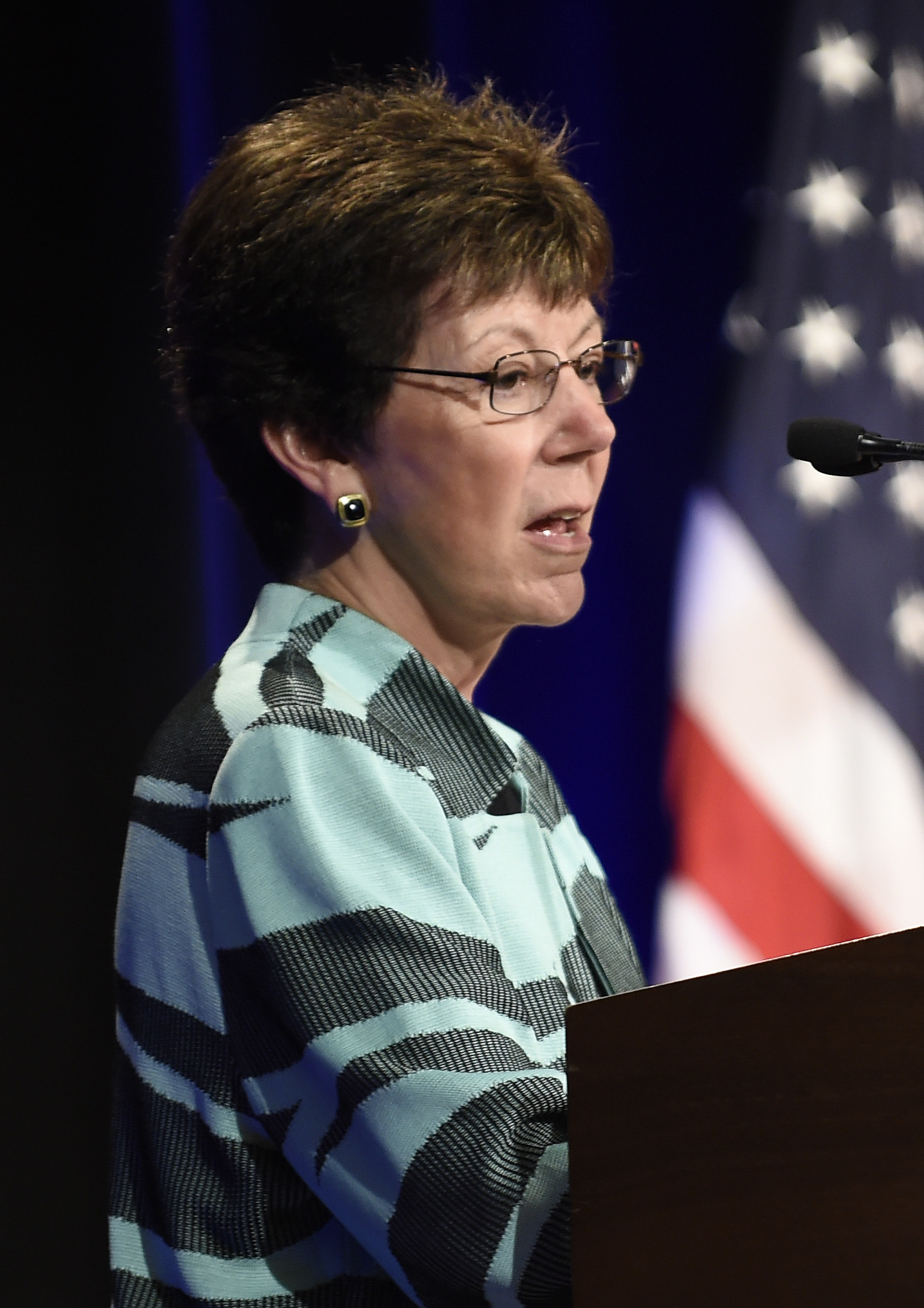
Delores M. Etter, 2015

Upon leaving office, Etter joined the Electrical Engineering faculty of the United States Naval Academy. There, she became the first-ever Office of Naval Research Distinguished Chair in Science and Technology.

In 2000, Etter was elected a member of the National Academy of Engineering for the authorship of textbooks on computer applications in engineering, contributions to digital signal processing, and service to the profession.

President George W. Bush nominated Etter as Assistant Secretary of the Navy (Research, Development and Acquisitions) on September 6, 2005, and she subsequently held this office from November 7, 2005, until November 15, 2007. In this capacity, she was senior acquisition executive for the United States Navy and the United States Marine Corps and the Navy's representative for joint acquisitions with other branches of the United States Armed Forces (for example: the F-35 Lightning II and the MRAP). She was responsible for the Navy and Marine Corps' acquisition of ships, aircraft, vehicles, and information technology. The Dr. Delores M. Etter Top Scientists and Engineers award was named for her.

== Post-naval career ==
In June 2008, Etter joined Southern Methodist University in a joint appointment between the Electrical Engineering and Computer Science departments. At Southern Methodist, she became the Texas Instruments Distinguished Chair in Engineering Education; director of the Caruth Institute for Engineering Education; and a Senior Fellow of the John Goodwin Tower Center for Political Studies. She retired in 2017.

Government offices
Preceded by John J. Young Jr.	Assistant Secretary of the Navy (Research, Development and Acquisitions); November 7, 2005 – November 15, 2007	Succeeded by John S. Thackrah
