= John J. Young Jr. =

American government official (born 1962)

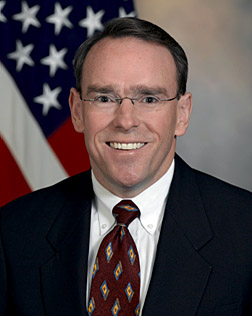
- Born: May 29, 1962 (age 64); Newnan, Georgia, U.S.
- Education: Georgia Institute of Technology; Stanford University
- Scientific career
- Workplaces: Lockheed Martin Aeronautics Rockwell International; Sandia National Laboratories; United States Senate Committee on Appropriations; United States Department of the Navy Office of the Secretary of Defense

John Jacob Young Jr. (born May 29, 1962 in Newnan, Georgia) was United States Assistant Secretary of the Navy (Research, Development and Acquisitions) from 2001 to 2005 and Under Secretary of Defense for Acquisition, Technology and Logistics from 2007 to 2009. He is the founder and principal of JY Strategies, LLC.

== Early life and education ==
John J. Young Jr. was educated at the Georgia Institute of Technology (bachelor's degree in Aerospace Engineering). Participating in Georgia Tech's cooperative education program, while in university, he worked for Lockheed Martin Aeronautics in Fort Worth, Texas, where his work included engineering work for the F-16 Fighting Falcon and advanced fighter technology. He next worked at the Braddock Dunn & McDonald facility in Huntsville, Alabama, where he provided engineering support for the United States Army's missile defense efforts.

Young then returned to school, attending Stanford University, receiving a master's degree in Aeronautics and Astronautics.

== Early career ==
After earning his master's degree, he took a job with Rockwell International's Missile Systems Division in Duluth, Georgia. He joined Sandia National Laboratories in 1988, and his work at Sandia focused on hypersonic weapons, the aerodynamics of maneuverable reentry vehicles, and standoff bombs.

Young won an American Institute of Aeronautics and Astronautics Congressional Fellowship that took him to Washington, D.C. to work for the United States Senate Appropriations Subcommittee on Defense; after his fellowship, he joined the professional staff of the United States Senate Committee on Appropriations as the staff analyst for United States Department of Defense procurement, research, development, test and evaluation (RDT&E). In this capacity, he was responsible for reviewing all Department of Defense aircraft procurement programs, the Ballistic Missile Defense Organization, and the Defense Advanced Research Projects Agency. He also reviewed the science and technology budgets of the United States Navy, the United States Army, and the Office of the Secretary of Defense.

== Later career ==
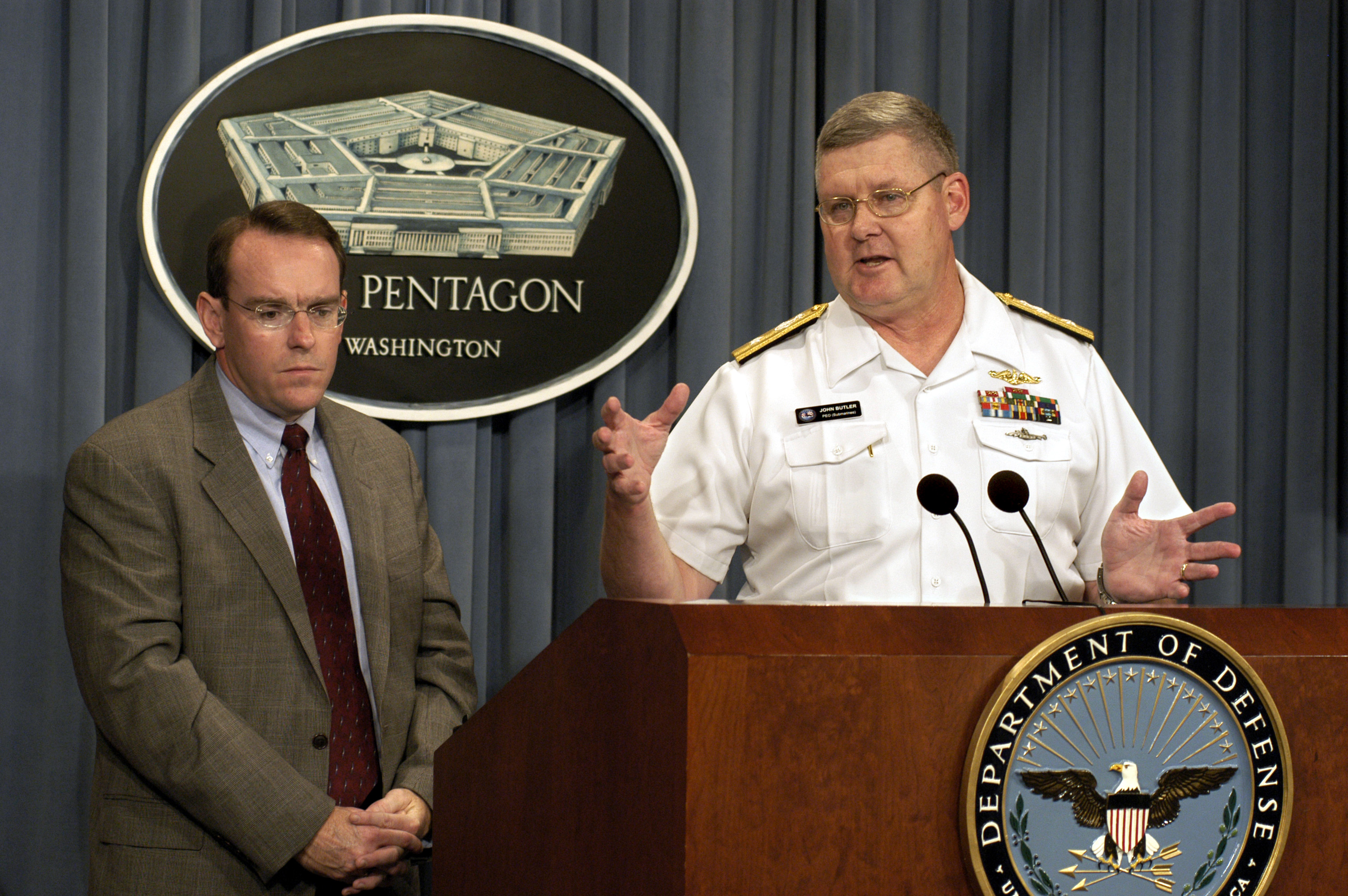
Young (left) and Rear Admiral John Butler at the announcement of plans for the United States Navy to acquire six Virginia class submarines, August 2003.

On June 24, 2001, President of the United States George W. Bush nominated Young as Assistant Secretary of the Navy (Research, Development and Acquisitions) and he was sworn in on July 17, 2001. He served in this office until November 6, 2005. During his time as Assistant Secretary of the Navy (Research, Development and Acquisitions), Young sought to help contain the research and development and procurement costs of the United States Department of the Navy.

A supporter of missile defense, he (along with Chief of Naval Operations Admiral Vern Clark and Lieutenant General Ronald T. Kadish), oversaw the transfer of the USS Lake Erie (CG-70) to the Missile Defense Agency; the procurement of the RIM-161 Standard Missile 3; and the modification of Arleigh Burke class destroyers to provide sea-based missile defense. Young began the RIM-174 Standard ERAM program and oversaw the addition of the AIM-120 AMRAAM to the Navy's Standard Missile. He also successfully earned Congressional approval for funding for the first Virginia class submarine. Other major initiatives included awarding contracts to begin construction of Zumwalt class destroyers, the P-8 Poseidon, the Lewis and Clark class dry cargo ships, the VH-71 Kestrel, and the Littoral Combat Ships. With his Air Force counterpart, he approved the Joint Tactical Radio System and the Distributed Common Ground System plan.

Upon leaving the post of Assistant Secretary of the Navy (Research, Development and Acquisitions) in 2005, Young became Director of Defense Research and Engineering for the United States Department of Defense. In addition to his duties as DDR&E, he successfully managed a task force that expanded the use of biometric systems to improve the security of U.S. forces and neighborhoods in Iraq. Defense Secretary Robert Gates then asked Young to lead a task for to expedite the production of Mine Resistant Ambush Protected (MRAP) vehicles. Under his leadership, DoD ramped up production to over 1,000 MRAPs per month, delivering over 14,000 MRAPs in roughly 18 months. These vehicles saved the lives of many soldiers from improvised explosive devices (IEDs), becoming one of the hallmarks of Secretary Gates' tenure. In 2007, President Bush nominated Young as Under Secretary of Defense for Acquisition, Technology and Logistics and, after confirmation by the United States Senate on October 4, 2007, Young took up this post in November 2007. As Under Secretary of Defense for Acquisition, Technology and Logistics, Young was responsible for providing United States Secretary of Defense Robert Gates and United States Deputy Secretary of Defense Gordon R. England with advice on all Department of Defense procurements, acquisitions, technological issues, and logistics. Notable work as AT&L included endorsing a remarkable swap of DDG-1000 and DDG-51 shipbuilding contracts between two industry teams and implementing new acquisition practices, management approaches and requirements reviews. He left this post in 2009 and founded JY Strategies, LLC, where he specializes in providing strategic insight to firms on defense programs, the Department of Defense, the Congressional authorization and appropriations process and change management. In addition to his work with JY Strategies, Young was VP of Business Development for E6 Partners, working with former Deputy Secretary of Defense, Gordon England. John is also a member of the Board of Directors of Saab Defense USA, SRI International, Ultra Electronics, Tenax Aerospace, Satelles, Assured Information Security and the Potomac Institute for Policy Studies. He serves on the advisory board of Georgia Tech Research Institute and Stevens Institute of Technology Acquisition Innovation Research Center, and he is a Senior Fellow and a member of the Board of Regents of the Potomac Institute. John is a Fellow of the American Institute of Aeronautics and Astronautics. He served as Commissioner on the Congressional Intelligence Research and Development (R&D) Commission from January 2012- December 2013.

Government offices
Preceded by H. Lee Buchanan III; Paul A. Schneider (acting)	Assistant Secretary of the Navy (Research, Development and Acquisitions); July 17, 2001 – November 6, 2005	Succeeded by Delores M. Etter
Preceded by Ronald M. Sega	Director of Defense Research and Engineering; 2005–2008	Succeeded by Zachary J. Lemnios
Preceded by Edward C. Aldridge Jr.	Under Secretary of Defense for Acquisition, Technology and Logistics; November 2007 – 2009	Succeeded by Ashton Carter
