= Sean Stackley =

American engineer & military officer (born 1957)

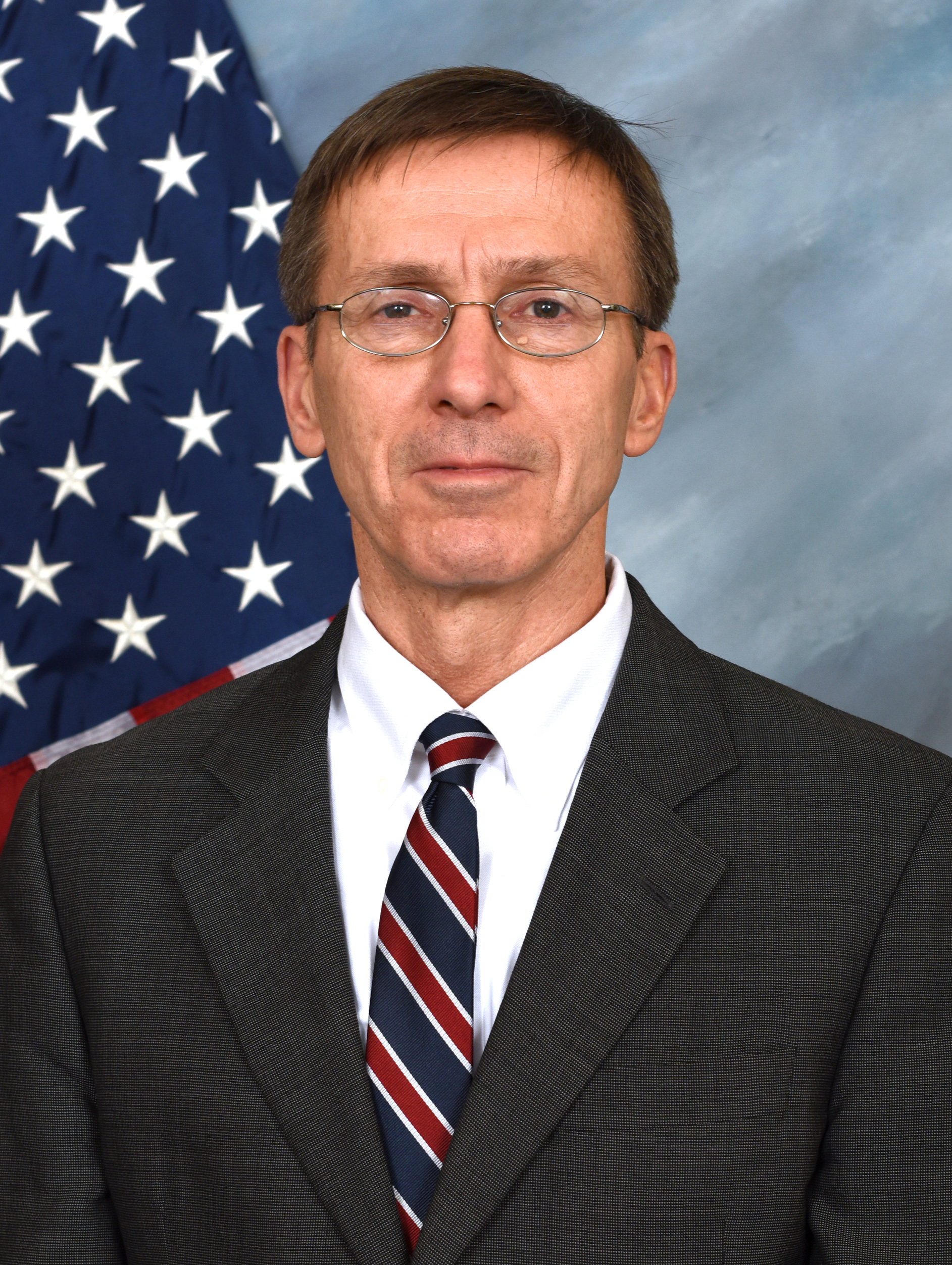
- Official portrait, 2017

Assistant Secretary of the Navy for Research, Development and Acquisition
- In office July 28, 2008 – August 3, 2017
- President: George W. Bush; Barack Obama; Donald Trump
- Preceded by: John S. Thackrah
- Succeeded by: James Geurts

Acting United States Secretary of the Navy
- In office January 20, 2017 – August 3, 2017
- President: Donald Trump
- Deputy: Thomas W. Hicks (acting); Thomas P. Dee (acting)
- Preceded by: Ray Mabus
- Succeeded by: Richard V. Spencer

Personal details
- Born: Sean Gerard Joseph Stackley; August 7, 1957 (age 69) Baltimore, Maryland, U.S.
- Spouse: Teresa Mullin
- Education: United States Naval Academy (BS); Massachusetts Institute of Technology (MS)

Military service
- Allegiance: United States
- Branch/service: United States Navy
- Years of service: 1979–2005
- Rank: Captain
- Awards: Legion of Merit (two awards); Meritorious Service Medal; Navy and Marine Corps Commendation Medal; Navy and Marine Corps Achievement Medal

Sean Gerard Joseph Stackley (born August 7, 1957) is an American engineer and former naval officer who served as the Assistant Secretary of the Navy for Research, Development and Acquisition from July 2008 to August 3, 2017. He also served as the acting secretary of the Navy from January 20 to August 3, 2017. As of September 2018, he is SVP and President, Communications & Networked Systems Segment at L-3 Technologies.

== Early career ==
Prior to his appointment to ASN (RDA), Stackley served as a professional staff member of the United States Senate Committee on Armed Services. During his tenure with the committee, he was responsible for overseeing Navy and Marine Corps programs, U.S. Transportation Command matters and related policy for the Seapower Subcommittee. He also advised on Navy and Marine Corps operations and maintenance, science and technology and acquisition policy.

=== United States Navy career ===
Stackley began his U.S. Navy career as a Surface Warfare Officer (SWO), serving in engineering and combat systems assignments aboard U.S.S. John Young (DD-973). Upon completing his warfare qualifications as a SWO, he transferred from the Unrestricted Line to the Restricted Line and was designated as an Engineering Duty Officer (EDO), serving in a series of industrial, fleet, program office and headquarters assignments in ship design and construction, maintenance, logistics and acquisition policy.

From 2001 to 2005, Stackley managed procurement for the Navy's LPD 17 program. His earlier career included serving as production officer for the U.S.S. Arleigh Burke (DDG-51) class and as a project Naval architect for the structural design of the Canadian Patrol Frigate, HMCS Halifax (FFH 330), involving him in the design, construction, and delivery of three lead ships.

Stackley was commissioned and graduated with distinction from the United States Naval Academy in 1979, with a Bachelor of Science in Mechanical Engineering. He holds the degrees of Ocean Engineer and Master of Science, Mechanical Engineering from the Massachusetts Institute of Technology. Stackley earned certification as professional engineer, Commonwealth of Virginia, in 1994.

== Assistant Secretary of the Navy for Research, Development and Acquisition ==
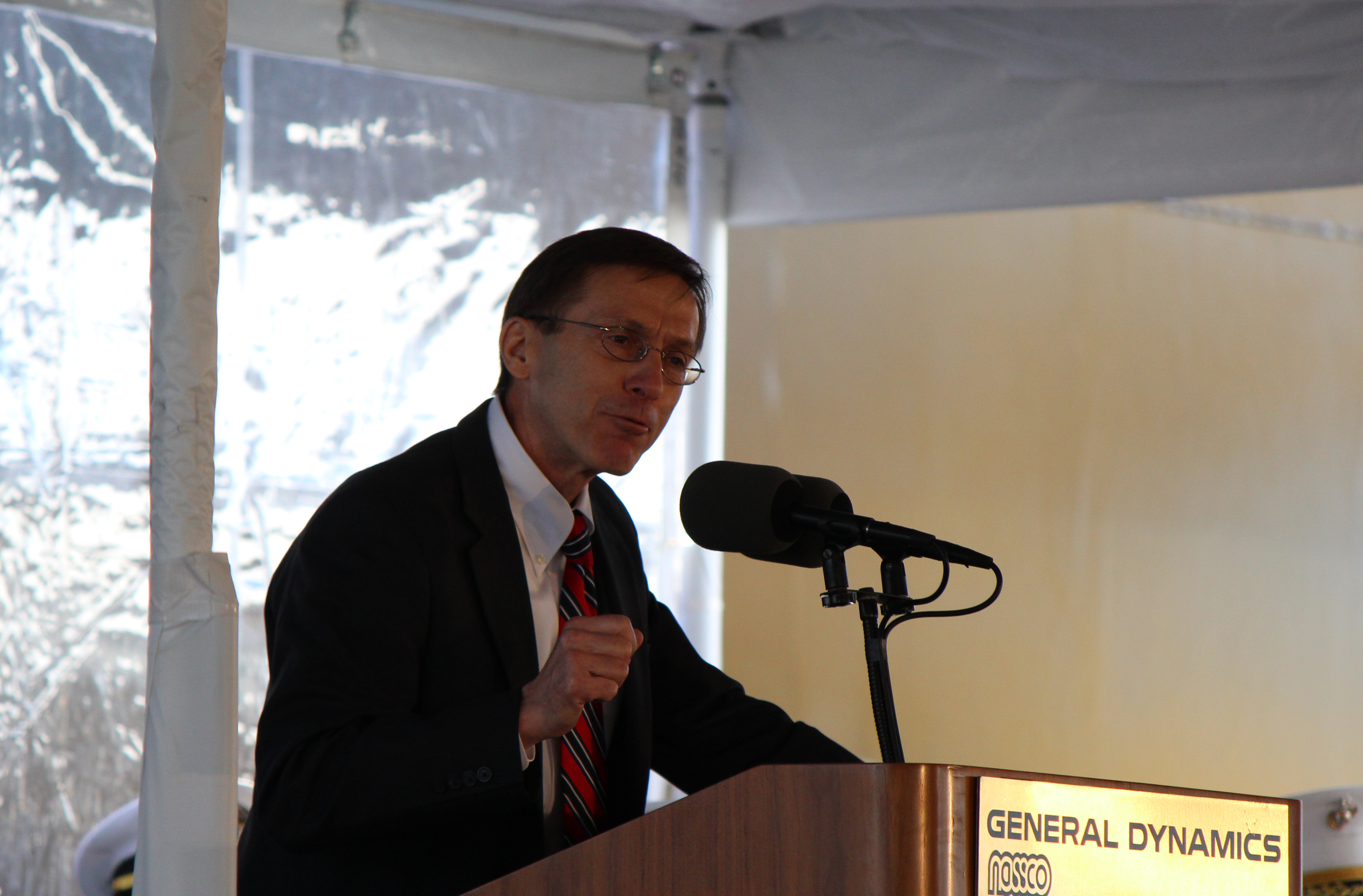
Stackley speaking at the christening of USNS John Glenn (T-MLP-2) in February 2014

On May 6, 2009, Stackley said at a Sea-Air-Space Exposition luncheon that the Navy would stress continuity and affordability in acquisition.

On May 15, 2009, Stackley defended the progress on the Electromagnetic Aircraft Launch System and supported longer terms for program managers.

Political offices
Preceded by John S. Thackrah	Assistant Secretary of the Navy for Research, Development and Acquisition; 2008–2017	Succeeded by James Geurts
Preceded by Ray Mabus	United States Secretary of the Navy; Acting; 2017	Succeeded by Richard V. Spencer
