= Assistant secretary =

Assistant secretary is a title borne by politicians or government officials in certain countries and territories, usually junior ministers assigned to a specific cabinet minister.

== Australia ==
The rank of assistant secretary denotes a high level government official who is positioned in the Government of Australia. The position falls under the Australian Public Service Act 1999, and holds the level of Senior Executive Service (SES) Level Band 1. The position also holds several other titles such as: branch head, national manager, group manager, and executive director. For those officials who hold diplomatic status and are positioned in Australian high commissions, embassies or state offices at the assistant secretary level hold the following titles: regional director, minister-counsellor, and ambassador. However, although most offshore Australian diplomatic staff at these levels are SES Band 1, some are SES Band 2. The median annual reward wage for a baseline assistant secretary level is $219,464 (AUD), excluding bonuses, superannuation or fringe benefits.

== Hong Kong, S.A.R. ==
An assistant secretary is a middle to senior official facilitating the work of the top officials, and is the subject officer for a specific policy domain among bureaux and departments. The position of assistant secretary belongs to the administrative officer grade in the Hong Kong Civil Service originated from the Colonial Administrative Service since 1862, being a cadet of multi-disciplined professional city administrators. As the top-calibre generalists in the government, they are the central policy-making and coordinating body in the Hong Kong Civil Service. The annual rate of pay for a baseline assistant secretary is pitched at Point 27 of the Master Pay Scale ($78,310 (USD) or $610,800 (HKD)) and will go up to Point 49 of the Master Pay Scale ($191,200 (USD) or $1,491,360 (HKD)). "Rank and Post (Rev Nov 2015)" (PDF). The grade has an established tradition of academic aristocracy. Over the 80 years between 1862, when the recruitment scheme was started, and the Japanese invasion of 1941, the majority of the cadets were educated at Oxford and Cambridge, although a substantial contingent (about 30 per cent) came from universities in Ireland and Scotland.

== India ==
From 1919 to 1945, the permanent posts of assistant secretary were filled by officers drawn from the Imperial Secretariat Service during the British Raj. Currently, the temporary position of assistant secretary is occupied by the officers of the Indian Administrative Service during their training period in Ministries of Central Government, as Ministry of Personnel, Public Grievances and Pensions has temporarily excluded section officers from Central Secretariat Service, which is later reverted.

== Ireland ==
The grade of assistant secretary is a position in the Irish Civil Service, which uses a nearly identical grading scheme to its British counterpart. It may now be alternatively styled, depending on the department or office.

== The Netherlands ==
An assistant secretary (in Dutch: "staatssecretaris") assists a specific minister. She or he is responsible for a specific domain (i.e., one or more important issues that require special attention—the assistant secretary can thus alleviate the minister's burden) and may be held accountable for his political actions, which means that he must resign once he has lost the support of the parliament. Not every department has an assistant secretary; whether one is installed depends on the importance of the department.

== United Kingdom ==
In the United Kingdom, the position of assistant secretary is a grade in the British Civil Service, now more commonly styled divisional manager or deputy director. In the grading scheme they are denoted Grade 5 (with basic salary starting at £73,000 as of 1 April 2022).

== United States ==
In the United States, the rank of assistant secretary denotes a high level civilian official within the United States federal government. An official of sub-Cabinet rank, assistant secretaries are appointed by the president of the United States with the consent of the United States Senate and are assigned to assist a specific Cabinet secretary. Assistant secretaries often manage major programs administered by a Cabinet department. Assistant secretaries are generally the lowest level "secretarial" positions appointed directly by the president.

Assistant secretaries are generally Level IV positions within the Executive Schedule, ranking below the position of under secretary. Since January 2022, the annual rate of pay for Level IV is $176,300.

== See also ==
- Cabinet secretary
- Deputy assistant secretary
- Parliamentary assistant
- Parliamentary secretary
- Permanent secretary
- Private secretary
- Secretary (title)
- Undersecretary
