= James Geurts =

American military officer and civil servant

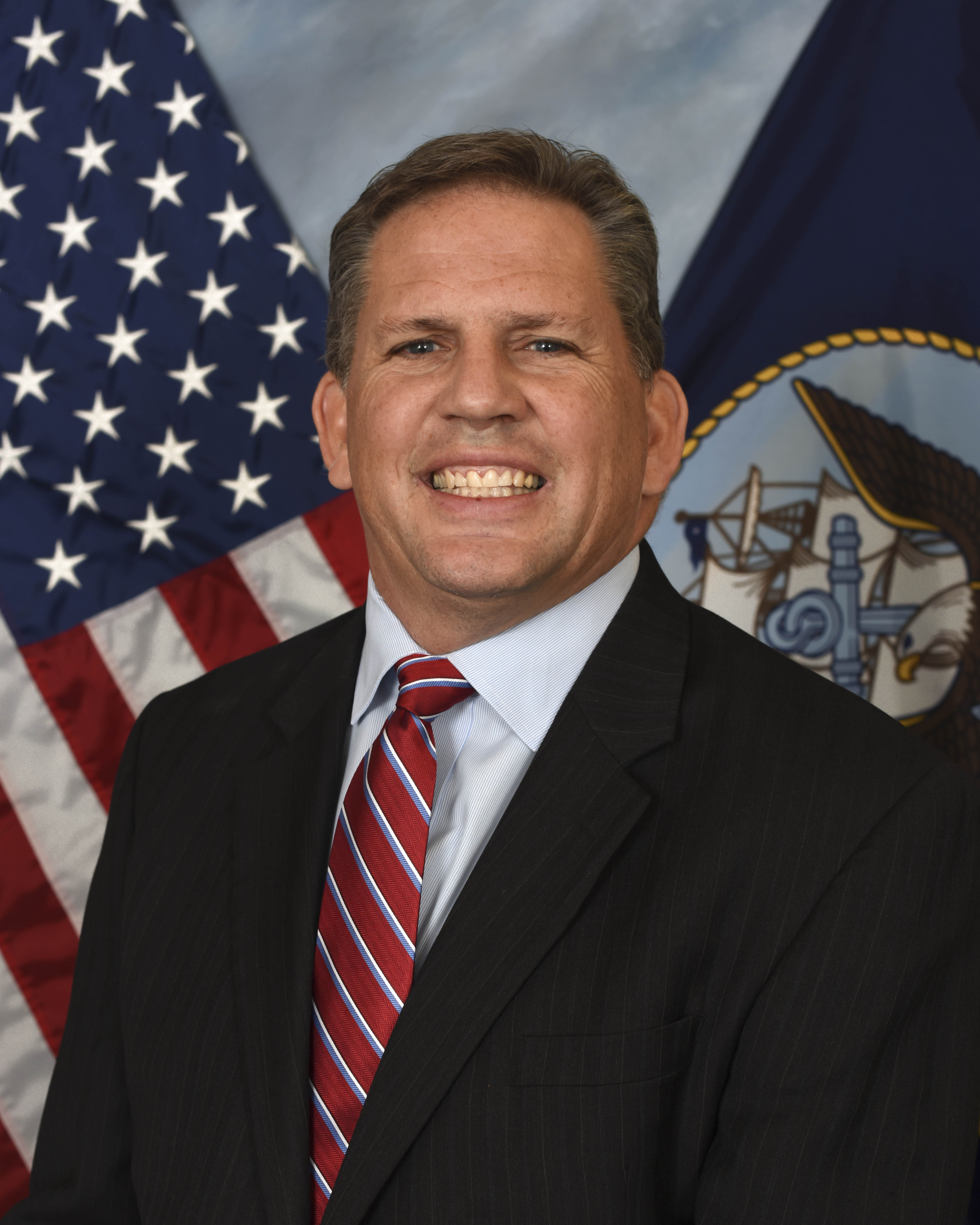

Performing the Duties of United States Under Secretary of the Navy
- In office February 4, 2021 – August 24, 2021
- President: Joe Biden
- Preceded by: Gregory J. Slavonic (acting)
- Succeeded by: Meredith A. Berger (acting)

Assistant Secretary of the Navy for Research, Development and Acquisition
- In office December 5, 2017 – January 20, 2021
- President: Donald Trump
- Preceded by: Sean Stackley
- Succeeded by: Nickolas Guertin

Personal details
- Education: Lehigh University; Air Force Institute of Technology; National Defense University

James F. Geurts is a senior American former government official who served as the official performing the duties of United States Under Secretary of the Navy, served as the Assistant Secretary of the Navy for Research, Development, and Acquisition, and served as the Acquisition Executive for United Stated Special Operations Command.

Guerts currently serves on the Department of War's Science, Technology, and Innovation Board.

== Career ==
Geurts served from 2017 to 2021 as Assistant Secretary of the Navy (Research, Development and Acquisition). Prior to that role, he served in the Senior Executive Service as Acquisition Executive for United States Special Operations Command, where he was responsible for all special operations forces research, development, acquisition, procurement, and logistics.

He previously served in the U.S. Special Operations Command as Deputy Director of Special Operations Research, Development and Acquisition Center, and as Commander of the Joint Acquisition Task Force Dragon. Geurts also served as Program Executive Officer for the Fixed Wing Aircraft at the U.S. Special Operations Command. He is a recipient of the Federal Executive of the Year Vanguard Award, Presidential Rank Award, William J. Perry Award, Defense Superior Service Medal, Legion of Merit, Defense Meritorious Service Medal with oak leaf cluster, Meritorious Service Medal, Air Force Commendation Medal, Joint Service Achievement Medal with oak leaf cluster, and Air Force Achievement Medal with oak leaf cluster.

Geurts was commissioned a United States Air Force officer after graduating from Lehigh University's ROTC program in 1987. While in the Air Force, he managed programs involving intercontinental ballistic missiles, surveillance platforms, tactical fighter aircraft, advanced avionics systems, stealth cruise missiles, training systems, and crewed and uncrewed special operations aircraft. In 2009, he retired from the Air Force as a colonel. Geurts was the driving force behind ThunderDrone and SOFWERX, two military-civilian idea incubators in Florida. These incubators helped develop the Tactical Assault Light Operator Suit, which is a robotic exoskeleton suit.

Political offices
Preceded by Gregory J. Slavonic; Acting	United States Under Secretary of the Navy; Acting; 2021	Succeeded by Meredith Berger; Acting
