= BDT & MSD Partners =

American merchant bank

- Type: Private
- Industry: Financial services
- Predecessor: BDT & Company; MSD Partners
- Founded: January 2023; 3 years ago
- Headquarters: Equitable Building, Chicago, U.S. 550 Madison Ave, New York City, U.S.
- Key people: Byron Trott (chairman and co-CEO); Gregg Lemkau (co-CEO)
- Products: Investment banking Private equity
- AUM: US$50 billion (2023)
- Website: bdtmsd.com

BDT & MSD Partners is an American merchant bank co-headquartered in Chicago and New York City. The firm has both an advisory platform and an investment platform.

== History ==
In January 2023, BDT & MSD was formed from the merger of BDT & Company, a merchant bank founded by Byron Trott that provides advice and capital to family and founder-led companies, and MSD Partners, an investment firm that manages the wealth of Michael Dell and his family.

Trott is currently the Chairman and co-CEO of the firm while Gregg Lemkau who was previously CEO of MSD Partners is the other co-CEO.

Dina Powell left Goldman Sachs to join the firm in May 2023. She departed the firm in January 2026 to become president and vice chair of Meta, while remaining a member of the BDT & MSD advisory board.

BDT & MSD is co-headquartered in Chicago and New York City.

In January 2025, it was announced that Goldman Sachs Group veteran Greg Olafson would join BDT & MSD as president, co-head of global credit and co-chief investment officer. Olafson joined Goldman in 2001 as an employee of its investment banking division and saw several achievements, including being selected as a partner in 2012.

== Investments and transactions ==
The bank was a financial advisor for Metropolis Technologies' $1.5 billion acquisition of SP Plus Corporation in 2023. It has acquired a minority stake in Auberge Hotels. In October 2024, the bank was part of a group of investors that acquired a majority stake in food manufacturer Badia Spices. In December 2024, the bank participated in a $273 million investment in Shell Bay, a luxury condominium development near Miami.

In June 2024, BDT & MSD Partners ranked 36th in Private Equity International's PEI 300 ranking among the world's largest private equity firms.

== Notable holdings ==
BDT & MSD's official strategy emphasizes "long-term" investments, with some notable holdings including:

=== Majority positions ===
- Alliance Laundry Systems
- The Boca Raton Resort
- Casa Dragones
- Coalition
- Culligan
- Four Seasons Resort Hualalai
- MJH Life Sciences
- Naples Beach Club
- Ring Container Technologies Inc.
- Universal Engineering Sciences
- Weber Inc.
- West Monroe Partners (50%)
- Whataburger

=== Minority positions ===
- Acrisure
- Auberge Resorts
- Badia Spices
- Brunswick Group (11%)
- Charlotte Tilbury Beauty
- Cognita
- East West Manufacturing
- Exyte
- Qualtrics
- Tory Burch LLC
- Under Armour (25%)
