= Bertha González Nieves =

Mexican businesswoman (born 1970)

Bertha González Nieves (born May 6, 1970) is a Mexican businesswoman in the tequila industry. She is the co-founder and CEO of Tequila Casa Dragones.

Forbes identified her as one of the 50 most powerful women in Mexico, and Revista Expansión named her one of Mexico's top young businesswomen.She is the first woman certified as a "Maestra Tequilera" by the Academia Mexicana de Catadores de Tequila, an organization recognized by the Tequila Regulatory Council. (CRT).

== Education ==
González Nieves graduated from Universidad Anáhuac in Mexico City with a BA in Business Administration. She holds a Master in Science in Integrated Marketing Communications from Northwestern University and in 2023, she was inducted into the Medill School of Journalism Hall of Achievement,

== Career ==
González Nieves worked as a consultant at Booz Allen & Hamilton, where she designed and implemented marketing strategies for global packaged goods companies. She then spent over 10 years as an executive for Grupo Jose Cuervo, the largest tequila company in the world. While at the company she held senior marketing and commercial positions, including Commercial Director for North America, Global Director of New Business and Innovation and Global Brand Director.

González Nieves is CEO of Casa Dragones Tequila Company, which she co-founded with businessman and founder of MTV Bob Pittman. Casa Dragones produces four tequilas: Casa Dragones Joven, a blend of silver and extra-aged tequila; Casa Dragones Blanco, an unaged silver tequila; Casa Dragones Añejo Barrel Blend, an añejo tequila matured in two types of custom barrels; and Casa Dragones Reposado Mizunara, a reposado tequila aged in Japanese oak casks.

González Nieves is a guest professor at the Universidad Autonoma de Guadalajara (UAG), where she teaches the university's first course on tequila, Tecnico Tequilero.

== Awards & Recognition ==
On December 17, 2009, González Nieves appeared on The Martha Stewart Show to demonstrate the tasting of Casa Dragones tequila. and demonstrated how to correctly taste Casa Dragones tequila. In May 2010, LA Times Magazine described González Nieves as "bolstering the top-tier-tequila movement" and referred to her as the "First Lady of Tequila.".

In November 2010, Casa Dragones received the "Grand Prix Stratégies du Luxe" design award for its product packaging.

In a March 2018 interview with The New York Times, she stated that the tequila industry could further develop Mexico culturally and economically. In March 2018, she was featured by CNN Travel in an article profiling San Miguel de Allende. She has been featured in El Universal, Harper's Bazaar, and Blackbook.

In 2018, she was named by Forbes as one of Mexico's 100 most powerful women of the year. In July 2018, Food & Wine En Español identified González Nieves as one of the most successful women in the world of Latin American gastronomy. In 2019, she was featured in a special segment of the Today Show called "Leading the Way'. In 2020, she was selected to participate in the 2020 "Marie Claire Power Trip" for female founders and executives.

In 2022, Revista Quién recognized her as “One of the 50 People Transforming Mexico” and she received a prestigious honorary mention from the Ernst & Young Entrepreneur of the Year Awards for her leadership in 2022.

== Other projects ==
In 2006, she helped launch Revista DF, Mexico's city magazine, an Editorial Mapas publication. She was one of the producers of the feature film "Matando Cabos," which was an official selection at the Sundance Film Festival in 2005.
