= Exyte =

German-based cleanroom design company

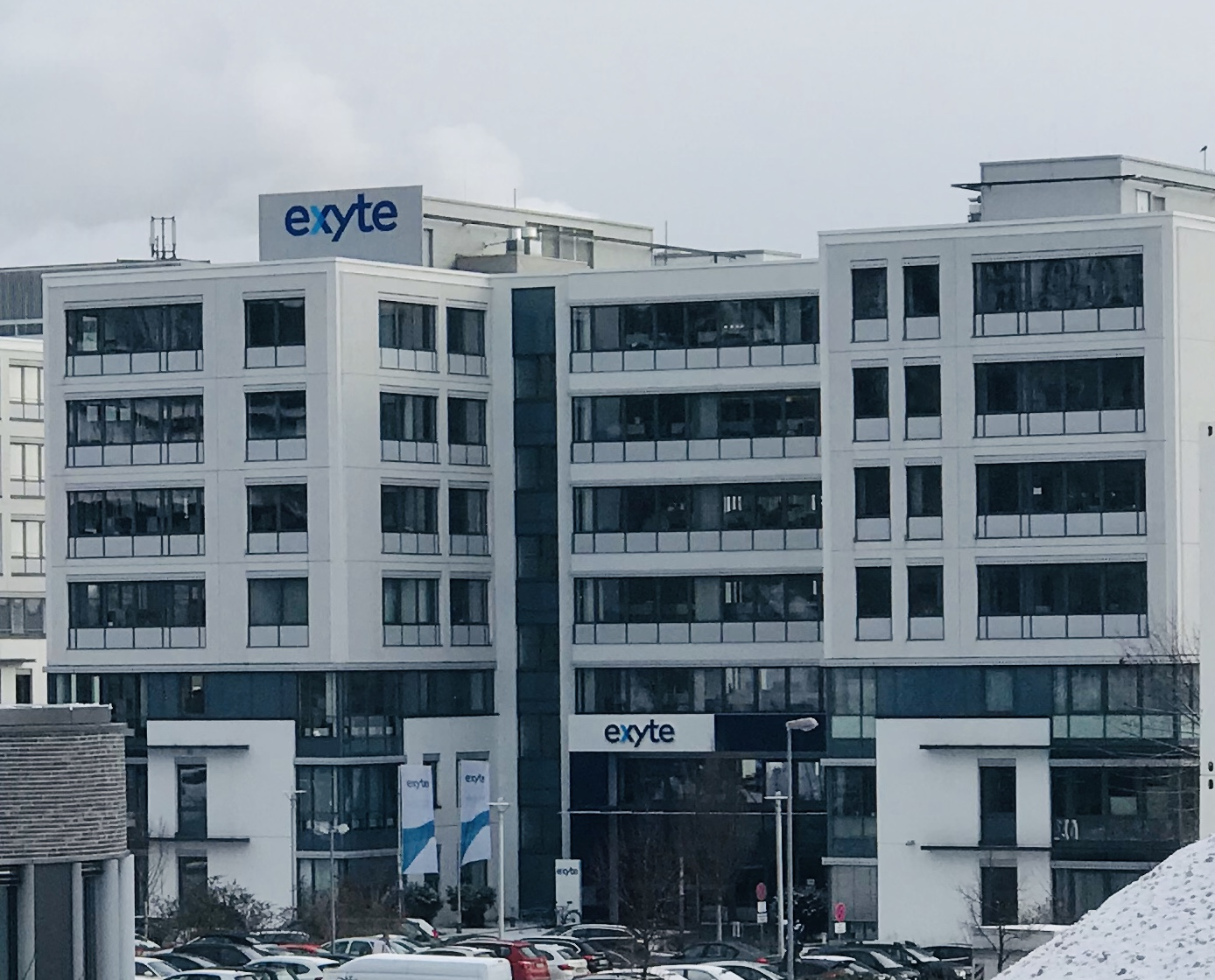
- Headquarters in Stuttgart, Germany
- Company type: GmbH
- Industry: Building design, engineering, procurement and construction
- Predecessor: M+W Group
- Founded: 1912
- Headquarters: Stuttgart, Germany
- Key people: Wolfgang Büchele (CEO); Peter Schönhofer (CFO); Georg Stumpf (Chairman of the supervisory board)
- Revenue: €4.9 billion (2021)
- Number of employees: 7400 (end of 2021)
- Website: www.exyte.net

Exyte is an international company for design, engineering, procurement, and construction in controlled and regulated environments. Its headquarters are located in Stuttgart, Germany. Exyte's core business includes solutions for the semiconductor, life sciences and chemical industries as well as data centers. The planning and design of high-tech production plants (especially cleanrooms) are the company's main focus.

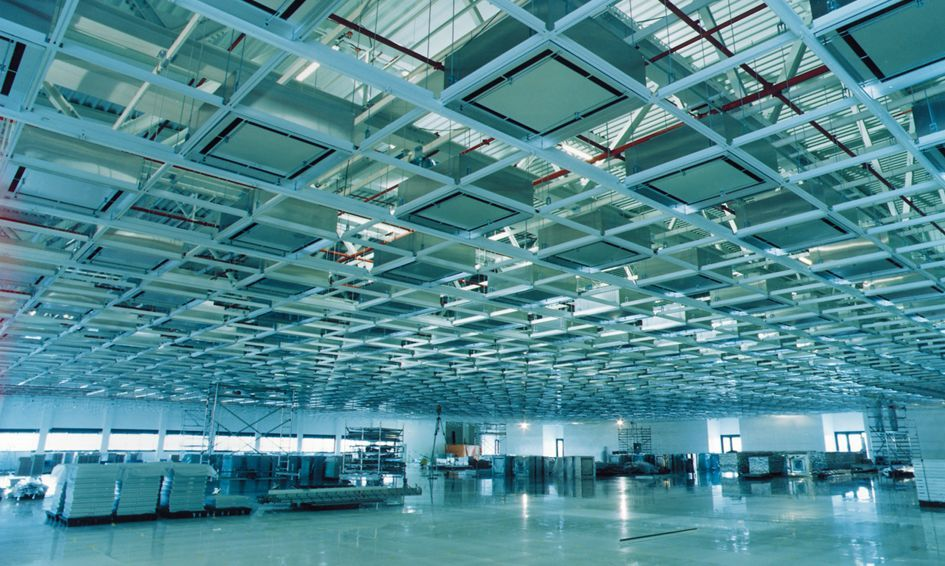
Cleanroom for microelectronic manufacturing

The company was founded in 1912 by Karl Meissner and Paul Wurst. For the first 50 years of its existence, Meissner + Wurst mainly produced extraction units, fans and equipment for ventilation technology. In the 1960s, Meissner + Wurst established itself as a pioneer in the development of cleanroom technology. Since the 1990s, the company expanded worldwide by extending its business areas, founding new branch offices and acquiring companies. Jenoptik took over Meissner + Wurst in October 1994 and merged it with Zander Klimatechnik AG from Nuremberg in August 1998 to form M+W Zander. The building services engineering division was spun off from the group in a management buyout under the name M+W Zander Gebäudetechnik GmbH in 2004 and was renamed Caverion Deutschland GmbH in February 2007. In 2005 the Swiss investor Springwater Capital took over M+W Zander, and in 2008 the facility management division was transferred to HSG, which belongs to the Bilfinger Group. Since then, the company has operated under the name of M+W Group, or M+W for short, and is 100% owned by the Austrian holding company Stumpf Group since 2009.

The Exyte Group was established in 2018 from a reorganization of the M+W Group. The core businesses (solutions for the semiconductor, batteries, biopharma and Life sciences as well as services for Data centers) were bundled within the Exyte Group, while all other business activities, which are mainly related to energy projects, are still conducted under the brand name M+W Group. In 2018, the company announced its plans for a public listing and that a larger minority stake would be sold via an IPO. This IPO was postponed in October of the same year due to unfavorable market conditions. In November 2022 BDT Capital Partners agreed to acquire a significant share of Exyte. In March 2024, it was announced Exyte had acquired CollabraTech Solutions, a Phoenix, Arizona-based delivery systems and contract manufacturing services company, for an undisclosed amount. Later that year Exyte acquired TTP Group, a European-focused pharmaceutical and chemical consulting and engineering firm.
