= TruAmerica Multifamily =

- Type: Private
- Industry: Real estate
- Founder: Robert E. Hart
- Headquarters: Los Angeles, CA, United States
- Area served: U.S.
- Website: www.truamerica.com

TruAmerica Multifamily is a Los Angeles-based multifamily investment firm that specializes in the acquisition and renovation of large class B apartment properties across the United States. Since its founding in 2013 by real estate investor Robert E. Hart, the company has acquired and/or asset manages a portfolio of more than 55,000 apartment units valued at roughly $16.1 billion.

== History ==
TruAmerica was formed in 2013 by a partnership between Hart and The Guardian Life Insurance Company of America. Hart founded the company after leaving Kennedy Wilson, a global real estate company where he served for 13 years as president and CEO of its multifamily management group. Since its founding, TruAmerica has largely focused on investing in and renovating older mid-level or “Class B” garden style and midrise apartment communities to attract a segment of the population that rents out of necessity. These properties are located in first or second ring submarkets outside major metros areas and employment hubs.

In 2015, TruAmerica partnered with Guardian and Allstate to purchase a 14 property apartment portfolio in Southern California for $482 million. While mid-level apartments remain its main focus, TruAmerica has also made investments in luxury properties. In 2014, TruAmerica in partnership with Capri Capital Partners acquired The Vermont, a luxury apartment community in Los Angeles' Koreatown for $283 million. In 2016, it purchased Millennium Woodland Hills, a luxury apartment community in Los Angeles, for $163 million.

In its first years of existence, TruAmerica focused on investments in major metro areas throughout the western U.S., including Northern and Southern California, Salt Lake City, Las Vegas, San Diego, Phoenix, Denver, Portland, and Seattle. In June 2016, the firm made its first investment East of the Rocky Mountains with a $187 million acquisition of a 1,004 unit apartment portfolio in Baltimore and Annapolis. It opened an East Coast office in Arlington, Virginia in September 2016 to support its increasing investment activities in select East Coast markets. Shortly thereafter, it partnered with Ares Management to purchase a 1,402-unit portfolio in the Baltimore area.

In 2017, it made a series of investments in Florida properties. In June 2017, TruAmerica partnered with InvestCorp to purchase two apartment complexes totalling 708 units in Orlando, Florida for $98 million. In September, it partnered with MSD Capital, the investment firm founded by Michael Dell, the founder of Dell Technologies, to purchase a $66 million apartment complex in Fort Myers, Florida. In October, it partnered with an unidentified investor to buy a 300-unit apartment complex in Orlando for $47.7 million. In 2017, TruAmerica was named the #43 largest apartment owner in the United States by the National Multifamily Housing Association. At the end of 2017, 15 percent of the company's portfolio was located in Maryland and Florida and it signaled plans to make major investments in other mid-Atlantic and southern states. Blackstone Real Estate Income Trust became the 16th institutional capital partner to joint venture with TruAmerica when they acquired a 635-unit portfolio of assets in Denver and Seattle in January 2018. TruAmerica ended 2018 with $1.3 billion in transaction activity.

In 2019, the firm continued its expansion into the southeast property markets entering Atlanta in January partnering with Tokyu Land US Corp on two metro Atlanta projects for $100 million. and North Carolina in September 2019 by acquiring an 830-unit portfolio in Raleigh, NC for $108.7 million.

In December 2021, the firm closed the TruAmerica Workforce Housing Fund, its first discretionary fund surpassing its $400 million goal with $575 million in equity commitments.
