= DFO Management =

American private investment firm

DFO Management, LLC
- Formerly: MSD Capital (1998–2022)
- Type: Private
- Industry: Family office
- Founded: 1998; 28 years ago
- Founder: Michael Dell
- Headquarters: One Vanderbilt, New York City, New York, United States
- Website: www.dellfamilyoffice.com

DFO Management, LLC (formerly MSD Capital) is an American family office that manages the capital of Michael Dell and his family. Established in 1998, it is headquartered in New York City and has offices in Santa Monica, California and West Palm Beach, Florida.

== Founding and management ==
In 1998, Michael Dell recruited John C. Phelan and Glenn R. Fuhrman to form MSD Capital to manage his family's wealth. For over 20 years, Phelan and Fuhrman had been co-managing partners of MSD Capital, until the end of 2019 when Fuhrman retired. In 2021, Gregg Lemkau joined as CEO and has run the firm since. Phelan continued as chief investment officer until his retirement in June 2022.

In December 2022, MSD Capital was restructured to form DFO Management.

== Activities ==
From 1998 to 2019, MSD Capital generated more than $17 billion in profits.

Based on the most recent Form 13F filings by MSD Capital, its holding of the equity of public companies include PVH Corp. and Dine Brands Global.

Among MSD Capital's real estate holdings are Four Seasons Resort Maui and Four Seasons Resort Hualalai.

In 2008, MSD Capital joined a consortium to acquire the assets of IndyMac Bank for around $13.9 billion, renaming it OneWest Bank.

In 2013, MSD Capital participated in the $24 billion acquisition of Dell Inc. by Michael Dell and Silver Lake, as well as Dell's $60 billion merger with EMC in 2016 and the company's 2018 IPO.

In July 2016, it was announced that MSD Capital and MSD Partners would provide preferred equity financing to support WME-IMG in its acquisition of UFC, the professional mixed martial arts (MMA) organization, alongside strategic investors KKR and Silver Lake Partners.

Also in 2016, MSD Capital bought an interest in Grand Central Terminal's air rights for $126 million. Two years later they sold some of the air rights to JPMorgan for $238 million.

In August 2017, MSD Capital partnered with TruAmerica Multifamily to acquire the Florida-based multifamily community Sienna at Lake Vista for $66 million.

== MSD Partners ==
In 2009, the principals of MSD Capital formed MSD Partners, an investment adviser registered with the U.S. Securities and Exchange Commission, to enable outside investors to invest in strategies that were developed by MSD Capital. Since then, MSD Partners has operated as a separate entity from MSD Capital. The firm operates from New York, Santa Monica and West Palm Beach. It focuses on four areas of investing: credit, private equity, real estate and growth equity.

MSD Credit invests in liquid corporate credit, including leveraged loans, private credit and real estate credit with an emphasis on long-term partnerships.

MSD Private Capital invests in control buyouts, significant minority and structured equity, with the flexibility for long-term investment. The Private Capital Group is primarily focused on control private equity investments. MSD's private equity team has invested in East West Manufacturing, West Monroe Partners, Owl Rock Capital Corp, Ultimate Fighting Championship, and WIRB-Copernicus Group. In 2017, MSD invested a combined $650 million in the acquisitions of Hayward Industries Inc. and Ring Container Technologies Inc.

MSD Real Estate seeks assets with significant barriers to entry and strong long-term growth characteristics. Since its founding in 2004, the MSD Real Estate team has committed approximately $2.5 billion of equity into more than 35 real estate and real estate-related transactions. The firm's real estate deals include Four Seasons Maui, Fairmont Miramar, and The Boca Raton.

MSD Growth is focused on high growth, founder-led, private technology companies with a preference for enterprise, consumer, fintech and healthcare industries. Investments range from $10 million to $100+ million in a single company.

In October 2022, MSD Partners merged with BDT & Co to form BDT & MSD Partners.
