= 2024 United States Senate election in Virginia =

- November 5, 2024
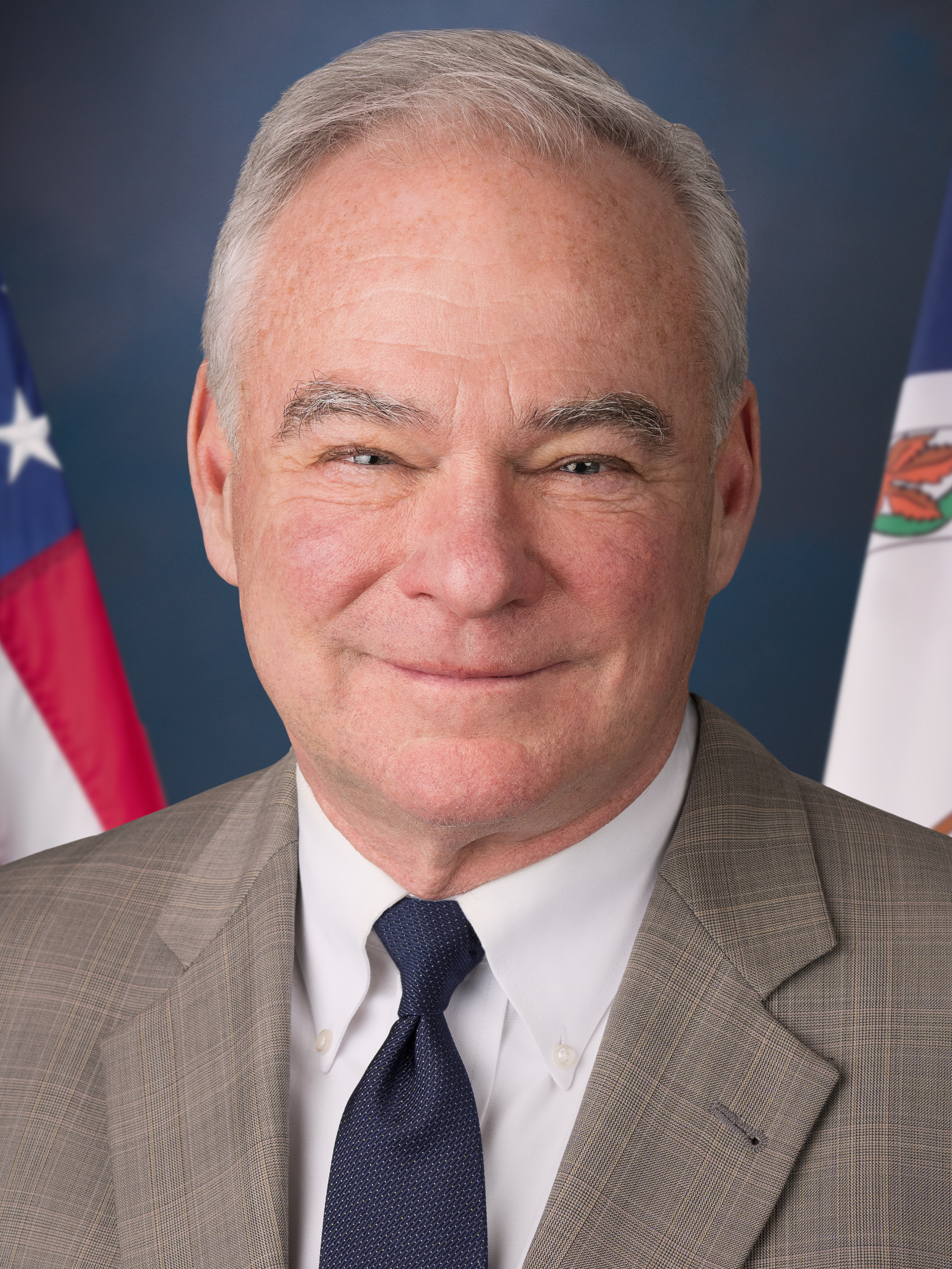

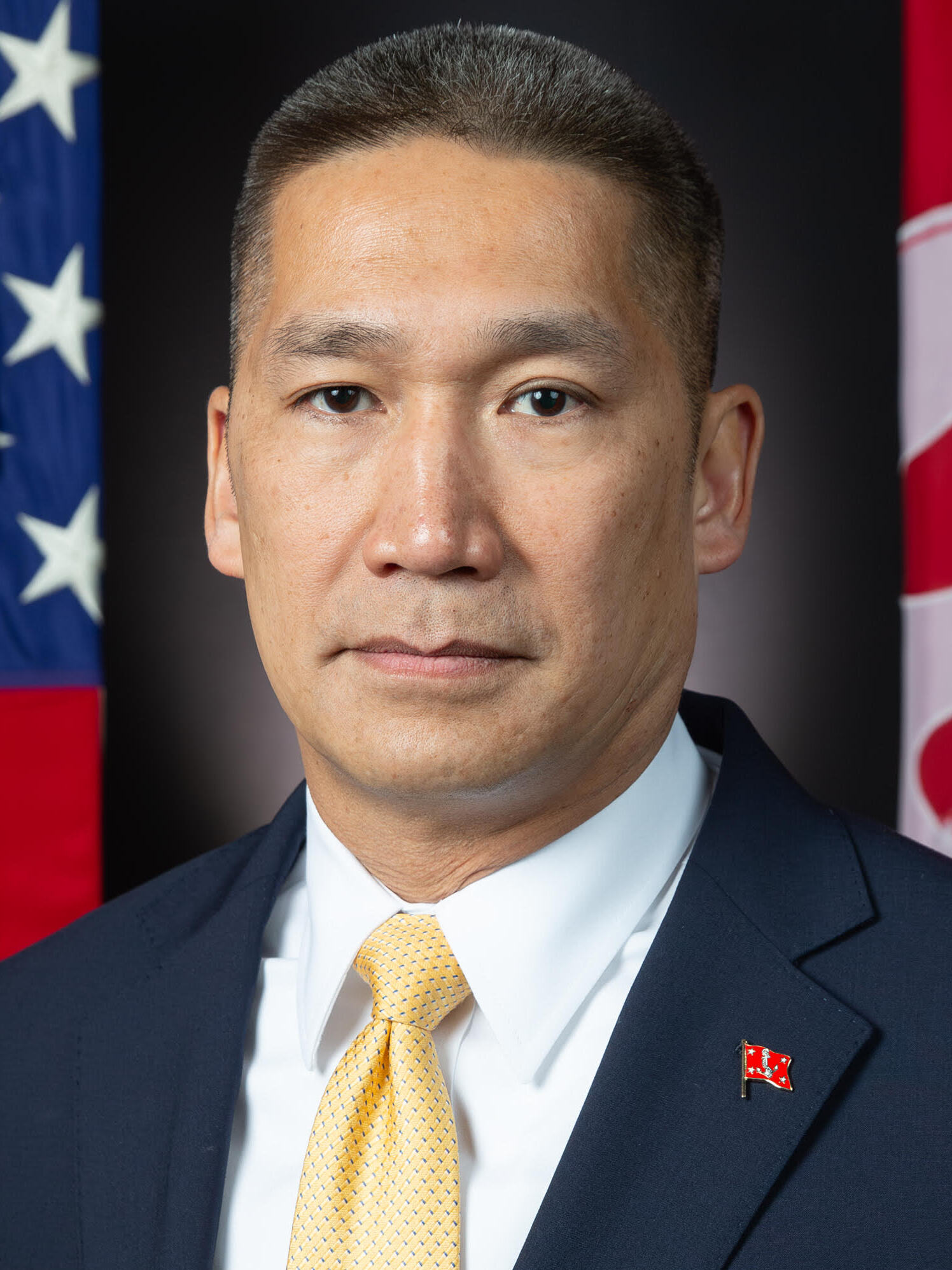
Nominee	Tim Kaine	Hung Cao
Party	Democratic	Republican
Popular vote	2,417,115	2,019,911
Percentage	54.37%	45.44%
- Kaine: 40–50% 50–60% 60–70% 70–80% 80–90% >90% Cao: 40–50% 50–60% 60–70% 70–80% 80–90% Tie: 50%
U.S. senator before election
Tim Kaine
Democratic
Elected U.S. senator
Tim Kaine
Democratic

The 2024 United States Senate election in Virginia was held on November 5, 2024, to elect a member of the United States Senate to represent the Commonwealth of Virginia. Democratic incumbent Tim Kaine won re-election to a third term, defeating Republican former U.S. Navy captain Hung Cao by an 8.93% margin. Primary elections took place on June 18, 2024. Although Kaine underperformed polling and won by his lowest margin since his first election in 2012, he outperformed Kamala Harris in the concurrent presidential election by 3.15 percentage points.

== Background ==
Virginia is considered to be a moderately blue state at the federal level, with Joe Biden carrying Virginia by about 10 percentage points in the 2020 presidential election. Democrats control both U.S. Senate seats, a majority in its U.S. representative congressional delegation, and the minimum majority in both houses of the Virginia General Assembly. However, Republicans flipped all three statewide constitutional offices in the 2021 elections.

Kaine was first elected in 2012 by 6 points, defeating former U.S. Senator George Allen, and won re-election in 2018 by 16 points. Republicans have not won a U.S. Senate race in Virginia since 2002.

This race was considered to be clearly favoring Kaine as he is popular amongst Virginian voters and typically over-performs other down-ballot candidates.

== Democratic primary ==
=== Candidates ===
==== Nominee ====
- Tim Kaine, incumbent U.S. senator (2013–present)

=== Endorsements ===
Tim Kaine

U.S representatives

- Gabby Giffords, former AZ-08 (2007–2012)

Individuals

- Cristina Tzintzún Ramirez, labor organizer and president of NextGen America PAC (2021–present)

Organizations

- Feminist Majority PAC
- Giffords
- Harvard College Democrats
- Humane Society Legislative Fund
- Jewish Democratic Council of America
- Joint Action Committee for Political Affairs
- J Street PAC
- League of Conservation Voters
- LGBT Democrats of Virginia
- National Committee to Preserve Social Security and Medicare PAC
- Natural Resources Defense Council
- NextGen America PAC
- Population Connection Action Fund
- Sierra Club

Labor unions

- United Mine Workers of America

=== Fundraising ===
Campaign finance reports as of May 29, 2024
Candidate	Raised	Spent	Cash on hand
Tim Kaine (D)	$14,583,509	$8,488,125	$8,615,046
Source: Federal Election Commission

== Republican primary ==
=== Candidates ===
==== Nominee ====
- Hung Cao, former U.S. Navy captain and nominee for Virginia's 10th congressional district in 2022

==== Eliminated in primary ====
- Jonathan Emord, constitutional lawyer
- Eddie Garcia, financial advisor and former congressional aide
- Scott Parkinson, former Club for Growth vice president of government affairs and former chief of staff to Ron DeSantis
- Chuck Smith, former chair of the Virginia Beach Republican Party, nominee for Virginia's 3rd congressional district in 2010, and candidate for attorney general in 2017 and 2021

=== Endorsements ===
Hung Cao

Executive branch officials

- Donald Trump, former president of the United States (2017–2021) and 2024 presidential nominee

Governors

- Bob McDonnell, former governor of Virginia (2010–2014)

Individuals

- Oliver North, former president of the National Rifle Association of America (2018–2019), nominee for this seat in 1994
Jonathan Emord

U.S. representatives

- Ron Paul, former TX-14 (1976–1977, 1979–1985, 1997–2013) (Libertarian)
- Barry Goldwater Jr., former CA-20 (1969–1983)
Scott Parkinson

U.S. senators

- Ted Cruz, Texas (2013–present)
- Jim DeMint, former South Carolina (2005–2013)
- Mike Lee, Utah (2011–present)
- Tommy Tuberville, Alabama (2021–present)

U.S. representatives

- Jim Banks, IN-03 (2017–2025)
- Andy Biggs, AZ-05 (2017–present)
- Dan Bishop, NC-09 (2019–2025)
- Lauren Boebert, CO-04 (2021–present)
- Josh Brecheen, OK-02 (2023–present)
- Eli Crane, AZ-02 (2023–present)
- Bob Good, VA-05 (2021–2025)
- Byron Donalds, FL-19 (2021–present)
- Mary Miller, IL-15 (2021–present)
- Barry Moore, AL-01 (2021–present)
- Anna Paulina Luna, FL-13 (2023–present)
- Scott Perry, PA-10 (2013–present)
- August Pfluger, TX-11 (2021–present)
- Matt Rosendale, MT-02 (2021–2025)
- Jason Smith, MO-08 (2013–present)

Individuals

- David Bossie, president of Citizens United

Organizations

- Citizens United
Chuck Smith

State legislators

- Amanda Chase, former SD-11 (2016–2024)

=== Fundraising ===
Campaign finance reports as of May 29, 2024
Candidate	Raised	Spent	Cash on hand
Hung Cao (R)	$2,508,562	$2,398,405	$202,637
Jonathan Emord (R)	$932,828 (Note: $528,167 of this total was self-funded by Emord)	$897,923	$34,905
Eddie Garcia (R)	$340,558	$315,309	$25,249
Scott Parkinson (R)	$930,240	$601,089	$329,151
Chuck Smith (R)	$556,762	$536,262	$20,499
Source: Federal Election Commission

=== Campaign ===
Hung Cao, the eventual Republican nominee, was embroiled in multiple controversies. Following the partial collapse of the Francis Scott Key Bridge after being struck by a container ship, Cao blamed Secretary of Transportation Pete Buttigieg for the accident, claiming that Buttigieg "spends more time talking about racial equity with regard to highways and about climate change than about focusing on the fundamentals of keeping our country and our infrastructure working." Later, Cao claimed that Monterey, California is "a very dark place now, a lot of witchcraft, and the Wiccan community has really taken over there," adding that "we can't let that happen in Virginia."

In February 2023, Cao announced the formation of a PAC called Unleash America, with the PAC's goal being "to get Republicans elected" in the House of Delegates elections and State Senate elections in 2023. However, in April 2024, the Staunton-based publication The News Leader published an article claiming that none of the $103,489 raised by the PAC was spent on state house or state senate elections, but were instead spent on Cao's Senate bid. Cao would respond by denouncing the article as a "hit job" by a "podunk local newspaper" that he claimed was run by "left-wing hacks." In a virtual town hall hosted by the Fauquier County Republican Committee, Cao would also say that it would be "ridonkulous" and "crazy" for him to “drive six and a half hours down to Abingdon or something like that and to stand there with four other dudes and to have 30 seconds to answer questions." His comments have drawn backlash and accusations of being dismissive to rural portions of the commonwealth.

Despite these controversies, Cao was endorsed by former president Donald Trump for the Republican nomination. He would later win the party's nomination easily.

=== Results ===
Results by county and independent city: Cao: 30–40%; 40–50%; 50–60%; 60–70%; 70–80%; 80–90%; Garcia: 30–40%

Republican primary results
Party	Candidate	Votes	%
Republican	Hung Cao	168,868	61.79%
Republican	Scott Parkinson	29,940	10.95%
Republican	Eddie Garcia	26,777	9.80%
Republican	Chuck Smith	24,108	8.82%
Republican	Jonathan Emord	23,614	8.64%
Total votes		273,307	100.00%

== General election ==
=== Predictions ===
Source	Ranking	As of
The Cook Political Report	Solid D	November 9, 2023
Elections Daily	Solid D	August 9, 2024
Inside Elections	Solid D	November 9, 2023
Sabato's Crystal Ball	Safe D	November 9, 2023
Decision Desk HQ/The Hill	Likely D	August 26, 2024
CNalysis	Solid D	November 21, 2023
RealClearPolitics	Likely D	August 5, 2024
Split Ticket	Likely D	October 23, 2024
538	Likely D	November 2, 2024

=== Post-primary endorsements ===
Tim Kaine (D)

U.S. representatives

- Barbara Comstock, former VA-10 (2015–2019) (Republican)
- Denver Riggleman, former VA-05 (2019–2021) (Independent)

Organizations

- CASA in Action
- People for the American Way

Newspapers

- The Washington Post
Hung Cao

Organizations

- Log Cabin Republicans PAC
- National Federation of Independent Business

=== Fundraising ===
Campaign finance reports as of June 30, 2024
Candidate	Raised	Spent	Cash on hand
Tim Kaine (D)	$15,990,927	$10,698,945	$7,811,645
Hung Cao (R)	$3,051,361	$2,729,334	$414,508
Source: Federal Election Commission

=== Polling ===
Aggregate polls

Source of poll aggregation	Dates administered	Dates updated	Tim Kaine (D)	Hung Cao (R)	Undecided (Note: Calculated by taking the difference of 100% and all other candidates combined.)	Margin
FiveThirtyEight	through November 4, 2024	November 4, 2024	51.9%	41.2%	6.9%	Kaine +10.7%
RealClearPolitics	October 19 – November 4, 2024	November 4, 2024	52.0%	41.2%	6.8%	Kaine +10.8%
270toWin	October 26 – November 4, 2024	November 4, 2024	51.2%	41.8%	7.0%	Kaine +9.4%
TheHill/DDHQ	through November 4, 2024	November 4, 2024	52.2%	42.4%	6.4%	Kaine +9.8%
Average			51.8%	41.6%	6.6%	Kaine +10.2%

Poll source	Date(s) administered	Sample size (Note: Key: A – all adults RV – registered voters LV – likely voters V – unclear)	Margin of error	Tim Kaine (D)	Hung Cao (R)	Other	Undecided
AtlasIntel	November 1–4, 2024	2,202 (LV)	± 2.0%	53%	44%	1% (Note: "Blank/Null/Won't vote" with 1%)	2%
Research Co.	November 2–3, 2024	450 (LV)	± 4.6%	53%	41%	–	6%
Chism Strategies	October 28–30, 2024	520 (LV)	± 4.3%	46%	45%	–	9%
Cygnal (R)	October 27–29, 2024	600 (LV)	± 4.0%	52%	42%	–	7%
Roanoke College	October 25–29, 2024	851 (LV)	± 4.6%	51%	40%	3% (Note: "Refused" with 2%; "Some other candidate" with 1%)	6%
ActiVote	October 2–28, 2024	400 (LV)	± 4.9%	55%	45%	–	–
The Washington Post/ George Mason University	October 19–23, 2024	1,004 (LV)	± 3.5%	54%	41%	1% (Note: "Would not vote" with 1%)	4%
The Washington Post/ George Mason University	October 19–23, 2024	1,004 (RV)	± 3.5%	54%	40%	1%	5%
ActiVote	September 9 – October 14, 2024	400 (LV)	± 4.9%	56%	44%	–	–
Christopher Newport University	September 28 – October 4, 2024	800 (LV)	± 4.4%	55%	35%	5% (Note: "Refused" with 3%; "Someone else" with 2%)	5%
Emerson College (Note: Poll sponsored by The Hill and Nexstar)	September 22–24, 2024	860 (LV)	± 3.3%	51%	41%	2%	6%
Research America (Note: Poll sponsored by University of Mary Washington)	September 3–9, 2024	1,000 (A)	± 3.0%	45%	38%	8% (Note: "None/Wouldn't Vote" with 5%)	9%
Research America	September 3–9, 2024	756 (LV)	± 3.5%	49%	43%	2%	6%
The Washington Post/ George Mason University	September 4–8, 2024	1,005 (RV)	± 3.5%	53%	41%	1%	5%
The Washington Post/ George Mason University	September 4–8, 2024	1,005 (LV)	± 3.5%	53%	41%	–	5%
ActiVote	July 24 – September 1, 2024	400 (LV)	± 4.9%	55%	45%	–	–
Roanoke College	August 12–16, 2024	691 (LV)	± 4.5%	49%	38%	10% (Note: "Someone else" with 10%)	3%
Emerson College (Note: Poll sponsored by The Hill)	July 14–15, 2024	1,000 (RV)	± 3.0%	49%	39%	4% (Note: "Someone else" with 4%)	8%
Mainstreet Research/FAU	July 14–15, 2024	301 (A)	± 3.2%	42%	33%	5% (Note: "Another party" with 5%)	20%
Mainstreet Research/FAU	July 14–15, 2024	265 (LV)	± 3.2%	44%	34%	4% (Note: "Another party" with 4%)	19%
Mainstreet Research/FAU	July 12–13, 2024	617 (A)	± 3.2%	45%	32%	7% (Note: "Another party" with 7%)	15%
Mainstreet Research/FAU	July 12–13, 2024	544 (LV)	± 3.2%	47%	34%	6% (Note: "Another party" with 6%)	13%
NYT/Siena College	July 9–12, 2024	661 (RV)	± 4.2%	52%	34%	–	14%
NYT/Siena College	July 9–12, 2024	661 (LV)	± 4.4%	52%	36%	–	12%
Virginia Commonwealth University	June 24 – July 3, 2024	809 (A)	± 4.8%	49%	38%	14% (Note: "Wouldn't vote" with 8%; "Someone else" with 6%)	–
Fabrizio Ward (R)/ Impact Research (D) (Note: Poll sponsored by Virginians Against Neighborhood Slot Machines)	April 26–28, 2024	500 (RV)	± 4.4%	48%	36%	1%	16%

Hypothetical polling

Tim Kaine vs. Glenn Youngkin

Poll source	Date(s) administered	Sample size	Margin of error	Tim Kaine (D)	Glenn Youngkin (R)	Other	Undecided
Virginia Commonwealth University	July 14–25, 2023	804 (A)	± 5.46%	47%	42%	3% (Note: None/Would not vote with 2%, other with 1%)	7%
University of Mary Washington	September 6–12, 2022	1,000 (A)	± 3.1%	41%	39%	10% (Note: None/Would not vote with 5%, other with 5%)	10%

=== Debates ===
2024 Virginia U.S. Senate election debate
No.	Date	Host	Moderators	Link	Democratic	Republican
Key: P Participant A Absent N Not invited I Invited W Withdrawn						
Key: P Participant A Absent N Not invited I Invited W Withdrawn					Kaine	Cao
1	Oct. 2, 2024	NSU	Tom Schaad & Deanna Allbrittin	YouTube	P	P

=== Results ===
State Senate district results

State House of Delegates district results

2024 United States Senate election in Virginia
Party	Candidate	Votes	%	±%
Democratic	Tim Kaine (incumbent)	2,417,115	54.37%	−2.63%
Republican	Hung Cao	2,019,911	45.44%	+4.44%
Write-in		8,509	0.19%	+0.03%
Total votes		4,445,535	100.00%	N/A
Democratic hold				

==== By county and independent city ====
Locality	Tim Kaine Democratic		Hung Cao Republican		Write-in Various		Margin		Total votes cast
Locality	#	%	#	%	#	%	#	%	Total votes cast
Accomack	7,672	45.03%	9,339	54.82%	26	0.15%	−1,667	−9.78%	17,037
Albemarle	43,968	66.66%	21,912	33.22%	76	0.12%	22,056	33.44%	65,956
Alexandria	62,597	78.25%	17,175	21.47%	222	0.28%	45,422	56.78%	79,994
Alleghany	2,786	34.15%	5,358	65.69%	13	0.16%	−2,572	−31.53%	8,157
Amelia	2,314	29.22%	5,600	70.71%	6	0.08%	−3,286	−41.49%	7,920
Amherst	5,790	33.62%	11,414	66.27%	20	0.12%	−5,624	−32.65%	17,224
Appomattox	2,562	26.98%	6,923	72.91%	10	0.11%	−4,361	−45.93%	9,495
Arlington	100,725	78.47%	27,269	21.24%	365	0.28%	73,456	57.23%	128,359
Augusta	12,517	28.33%	31,605	71.53%	61	0.14%	−19,088	−43.20%	44,183
Bath	684	26.66%	1,881	73.30%	1	0.04%	−1,197	−46.65%	2,566
Bedford	13,068	25.80%	37,536	74.10%	52	0.10%	−24,468	−48.30%	50,656
Bland	709	20.74%	2,707	79.20%	2	0.06%	−1,998	−58.46%	3,418
Botetourt	6,608	30.62%	14,950	69.27%	24	0.11%	−8,342	−38.65%	21,582
Bristol	2,629	35.86%	4,699	64.09%	4	0.05%	−2,070	−28.23%	7,332
Brunswick	4,324	56.14%	3,372	43.78%	6	0.08%	952	12.36%	7,702
Buchanan	2,331	25.81%	6,686	74.02%	16	0.18%	−4,355	−48.21%	9,033
Buckingham	3,242	41.39%	4,581	58.49%	9	0.11%	−1,339	−17.10%	7,832
Buena Vista	935	33.17%	1,881	66.73%	3	0.11%	−946	−33.56%	2,819
Campbell	8,526	27.49%	22,449	72.38%	39	0.13%	−13,923	−44.89%	31,014
Caroline	8,249	47.18%	9,218	52.72%	18	0.10%	−969	−5.54%	17,485
Carroll	3,637	22.78%	12,318	77.14%	14	0.09%	−8,681	−54.36%	15,969
Charles City	2,397	57.03%	1,802	42.87%	4	0.10%	595	14.16%	4,203
Charlotte	2,148	36.00%	3,815	63.95%	3	0.05%	−1,667	−27.94%	5,966
Charlottesville	19,439	83.98%	3,650	15.77%	58	0.25%	15,789	68.21%	23,147
Chesapeake	67,224	52.92%	59,657	46.96%	149	0.12%	7,567	5.96%	127,030
Chesterfield	115,364	55.20%	93,336	44.66%	279	0.13%	22,028	10.54%	208,979
Clarke	4,182	43.22%	5,487	56.70%	8	0.08%	−1,305	−13.49%	9,677
Colonial Heights	3,259	37.37%	5,456	62.57%	5	0.06%	−2,197	−25.19%	8,720
Covington	1,025	41.96%	1,418	58.04%	0	0.00%	−393	−16.09%	2,443
Craig	671	21.73%	2,415	78.21%	2	0.06%	−1,744	−56.48%	3,088
Culpeper	11,211	39.56%	17,105	60.36%	24	0.08%	−5,894	−20.80%	28,340
Cumberland	2,164	39.89%	3,256	60.02%	5	0.09%	−1,092	−20.13%	5,425
Danville	10,986	63.31%	6,335	36.50%	33	0.19%	4,651	26.80%	17,354
Dickenson	1,929	28.24%	4,884	71.51%	17	0.25%	−2,955	−43.27%	6,830
Dinwiddie	6,335	40.83%	9,163	59.06%	18	0.12%	−2,828	−18.23%	15,516
Emporia	1,415	67.70%	673	32.20%	2	0.10%	742	35.50%	2,090
Essex	2,858	48.13%	3,072	51.73%	8	0.13%	−214	−3.60%	5,938
Fairfax City	8,882	66.57%	4,407	33.03%	53	0.40%	4,475	33.54%	13,342
Fairfax County	393,906	67.67%	186,266	32.00%	1,932	0.33%	207,640	35.67%	582,104
Falls Church	7,163	79.82%	1,791	19.96%	20	0.22%	5,372	59.86%	8,974
Fauquier	17,441	39.23%	26,971	60.66%	51	0.11%	−9,530	−21.43%	44,463
Floyd	3,302	34.52%	6,251	65.35%	12	0.13%	−2,949	−30.83%	9,565
Fluvanna	7,992	48.15%	8,581	51.70%	24	0.14%	−589	−3.55%	16,597
Franklin City	2,367	63.42%	1,359	36.41%	6	0.16%	1,008	27.01%	3,732
Franklin County	9,114	29.67%	21,569	70.21%	37	0.12%	−12,455	−40.54%	30,720
Frederick	19,769	38.39%	31,659	61.49%	62	0.12%	−11,890	−23.09%	51,490
Fredericksburg	8,858	66.92%	4,346	32.83%	32	0.24%	4,512	34.09%	13,236
Galax	893	33.25%	1,788	66.57%	5	0.19%	−895	−33.32%	2,686
Giles	2,593	28.68%	6,435	71.18%	13	0.14%	−3,842	−42.50%	9,041
Gloucester	7,522	32.80%	15,391	67.11%	21	0.09%	−7,869	−34.31%	22,934
Goochland	7,956	40.54%	11,655	59.39%	14	0.07%	−3,699	−18.85%	19,625
Grayson	1,888	23.77%	6,045	76.10%	11	0.14%	−4,157	−52.33%	7,944
Greene	4,731	39.62%	7,193	60.24%	16	0.13%	−2,462	−20.62%	11,940
Greensville	2,416	57.59%	1,770	42.19%	9	0.21%	646	15.40%	4,195
Halifax	7,397	41.90%	10,218	57.88%	40	0.23%	−2,821	−15.98%	17,655
Hampton	44,201	71.41%	17,611	28.45%	83	0.13%	26,590	42.96%	61,895
Hanover	27,207	37.79%	44,715	62.12%	65	0.09%	−17,508	−24.32%	71,987
Harrisonburg	10,922	64.63%	5,946	35.19%	31	0.18%	4,976	29.45%	16,899
Henrico	116,336	65.45%	61,160	34.41%	242	0.14%	55,176	31.04%	177,738
Henry	9,583	38.25%	15,426	61.58%	43	0.17%	−5,843	−23.32%	25,052
Highland	497	32.91%	1,012	67.02%	1	0.07%	−515	−34.11%	1,510
Hopewell	5,173	59.96%	3,438	39.85%	16	0.19%	1,735	20.11%	8,627
Isle of Wight	10,292	42.05%	14,163	57.87%	20	0.08%	−3,871	−15.82%	24,475
James City	26,991	52.83%	24,033	47.04%	68	0.13%	2,958	5.79%	51,092
King and Queen	1,628	39.30%	2,513	60.66%	2	0.05%	−885	−21.36%	4,143
King George	5,843	38.14%	9,459	61.75%	16	0.10%	−3,616	−23.61%	15,318
King William	3,659	32.25%	7,678	67.67%	10	0.09%	−4,019	−35.42%	11,347
Lancaster	3,364	46.35%	3,888	53.57%	6	0.08%	−524	−7.22%	7,258
Lee	2,306	23.58%	7,452	76.21%	20	0.20%	−5,146	−52.63%	9,778
Lexington	1,817	63.71%	1,031	36.15%	4	0.14%	786	27.56%	2,852
Loudoun	133,436	58.59%	93,441	41.03%	860	0.38%	39,995	17.56%	227,737
Louisa	9,124	38.22%	14,726	61.69%	22	0.09%	−5,602	−23.47%	23,872
Lunenburg	2,344	41.33%	3,324	58.60%	4	0.07%	−980	−17.28%	5,672
Lynchburg	17,020	46.54%	19,478	53.26%	75	0.21%	−2,458	−6.72%	36,573
Madison	2,839	33.85%	5,546	66.12%	3	0.04%	−2,707	−32.27%	8,388
Manassas	9,375	59.15%	6,438	40.62%	36	0.23%	2,937	18.53%	15,849
Manassas Park	3,713	63.44%	2,112	36.08%	28	0.48%	1,601	27.35%	5,853
Martinsville	3,515	64.31%	1,942	35.53%	9	0.16%	1,573	28.78%	5,466
Mathews	1,872	31.75%	4,015	68.10%	9	0.15%	−2,143	−36.35%	5,896
Mecklenburg	6,699	42.15%	9,170	57.70%	23	0.14%	−2,471	−15.55%	15,892
Middlesex	2,570	37.58%	4,265	62.37%	3	0.04%	−1,695	−24.79%	6,838
Montgomery	25,037	53.59%	21,575	46.18%	107	0.23%	3,462	7.41%	46,719
Nelson	4,520	48.16%	4,849	51.67%	16	0.17%	−329	−3.51%	9,385
New Kent	5,700	34.75%	10,695	65.19%	10	0.06%	−4,995	−30.45%	16,405
Newport News	49,499	66.08%	25,323	33.80%	91	0.12%	24,176	32.27%	74,913
Norfolk	61,334	72.05%	23,657	27.79%	140	0.16%	37,677	44.26%	85,131
Northampton	3,687	54.69%	3,047	45.19%	8	0.12%	640	9.49%	6,742
Northumberland	3,253	39.81%	4,912	60.11%	7	0.09%	−1,659	−20.30%	8,172
Norton	606	38.33%	973	61.54%	2	0.13%	−367	−23.21%	1,581
Nottoway	2,800	41.12%	4,000	58.74%	10	0.15%	−1,200	−17.62%	6,810
Orange	8,725	39.56%	13,289	60.25%	43	0.19%	−4,564	−20.69%	22,057
Page	3,618	27.85%	9,354	71.99%	21	0.16%	−5,736	−44.15%	12,993
Patrick	2,391	25.42%	7,005	74.48%	9	0.10%	−4,614	−49.06%	9,405
Petersburg	11,254	87.52%	1,583	12.31%	22	0.17%	9,671	75.21%	12,859
Pittsylvania	10,523	31.61%	22,725	68.26%	42	0.13%	−12,202	−36.65%	33,290
Poquoson	2,273	28.37%	5,729	71.51%	10	0.12%	−3,456	−43.14%	8,012
Portsmouth	28,791	71.26%	11,581	28.66%	30	0.07%	17,210	42.60%	40,402
Powhatan	5,949	28.59%	14,844	71.33%	16	0.08%	−8,895	−42.75%	20,809
Prince Edward	4,617	50.20%	4,567	49.65%	14	0.15%	50	0.54%	9,198
Prince George	7,048	41.29%	10,010	58.64%	13	0.08%	−2,962	−17.35%	17,071
Prince William	137,060	60.89%	87,310	38.79%	711	0.32%	49,750	22.10%	225,081
Pulaski	5,655	32.47%	11,743	67.43%	16	0.09%	−6,088	−34.96%	17,414
Radford	3,423	52.74%	3,051	47.01%	16	0.25%	372	5.73%	6,490
Rappahannock	2,053	40.93%	2,947	58.75%	16	0.32%	−894	−17.82%	5,016
Richmond City	89,672	83.56%	17,400	16.21%	242	0.23%	72,272	67.35%	107,314
Richmond County	1,562	37.98%	2,550	62.00%	1	0.02%	−988	−24.02%	4,113
Roanoke City	26,676	63.76%	15,082	36.05%	82	0.20%	11,594	27.71%	41,840
Roanoke County	22,978	40.56%	33,609	59.32%	70	0.12%	−10,631	−18.76%	56,657
Rockbridge	4,526	35.53%	8,199	64.37%	13	0.10%	−3,673	−28.83%	12,738
Rockingham	16,180	33.47%	32,081	66.36%	81	0.17%	−15,901	−32.89%	48,342
Russell	3,326	25.14%	9,885	74.72%	18	0.14%	−6,559	−49.58%	13,229
Salem	5,653	43.41%	7,352	56.46%	17	0.13%	−1,699	−13.05%	13,022
Scott	2,431	22.49%	8,359	77.33%	20	0.19%	−5,928	−54.84%	10,810
Shenandoah	7,968	33.06%	16,097	66.79%	36	0.15%	−8,129	−33.73%	24,101
Smyth	3,885	27.27%	10,339	72.58%	20	0.14%	−6,454	−45.31%	14,244
Southampton	3,914	40.25%	5,801	59.65%	10	0.10%	−1,887	−19.40%	9,725
Spotsylvania	37,339	47.48%	41,199	52.39%	106	0.13%	−3,860	−4.91%	78,644
Stafford	42,603	51.64%	39,764	48.19%	140	0.17%	2,839	3.44%	82,507
Staunton	7,820	58.38%	5,552	41.45%	24	0.18%	2,268	16.93%	13,396
Suffolk	31,587	59.68%	21,255	40.16%	81	0.15%	10,332	19.52%	52,923
Surry	2,232	51.42%	2,100	48.38%	9	0.21%	132	3.04%	4,341
Sussex	2,605	53.87%	2,226	46.03%	5	0.10%	379	7.84%	4,836
Tazewell	4,952	25.96%	14,096	73.88%	31	0.16%	−9,144	−47.93%	19,079
Virginia Beach	118,920	52.70%	106,476	47.19%	238	0.11%	12,444	5.52%	225,634
Warren	7,529	33.70%	14,771	66.11%	42	0.19%	−7,242	−32.41%	22,342
Washington	8,259	28.32%	20,851	71.49%	57	0.20%	−12,592	−43.17%	29,167
Waynesboro	5,521	49.58%	5,598	50.27%	16	0.14%	−77	−0.69%	11,135
Westmoreland	4,774	45.90%	5,615	53.99%	12	0.12%	−841	−8.09%	10,401
Williamsburg	5,635	72.28%	2,151	27.59%	10	0.13%	3,484	44.69%	7,796
Winchester	6,804	58.00%	4,905	41.81%	23	0.20%	1,899	16.19%	11,732
Wise	4,494	27.54%	11,802	72.33%	20	0.12%	−7,308	−44.79%	16,316
Wythe	3,732	24.85%	11,268	75.02%	20	0.13%	−7,536	−50.17%	15,020
York	18,726	47.47%	20,685	52.44%	36	0.09%	−1,959	−4.97%	39,447
Totals	2,417,115	54.37%	2,019,911	45.44%	8,509	0.19%	397,204	8.93%	4,445,535

Counties and independent cities that flipped from Democratic to Republican

- Caroline (largest town: Bowling Green)
- Essex (largest town: Tappahannock)
- Fluvanna (largest city: Lake Monticello)
- Lynchburg (independent city)
- Nelson (largest community: Nellysford)
- Waynesboro (independent city)
- Westmoreland (largest town: Colonial Beach)

=== By congressional district ===
Kaine won seven of 11 congressional districts, including one that elected a Republican.

District	Kaine	Cao	Representative
1st	48%	52%	Rob Wittman
2nd	51%	49%	Jen Kiggans
3rd	69%	31%	Bobby Scott
4th	68%	32%	Jennifer McClellan
5th	45%	55%	Bob Good (118th Congress)
5th	45%	55%	John McGuire (119th Congress)
6th	41%	59%	Ben Cline
7th	53%	46%	Abigail Spanberger (118th Congress)
7th	53%	46%	Eugene Vindman (119th Congress)
8th	75%	25%	Don Beyer
9th	33%	67%	Morgan Griffith
10th	55%	45%	Jennifer Wexton (118th Congress)
10th	55%	45%	Suhas Subramanyam (119th Congress)
11th	67%	32%	Gerry Connolly

== See also ==
- 2024 Virginia elections

== Notes ==
Partisan clients
