= Robert Pittman (media executive) =

American businessman

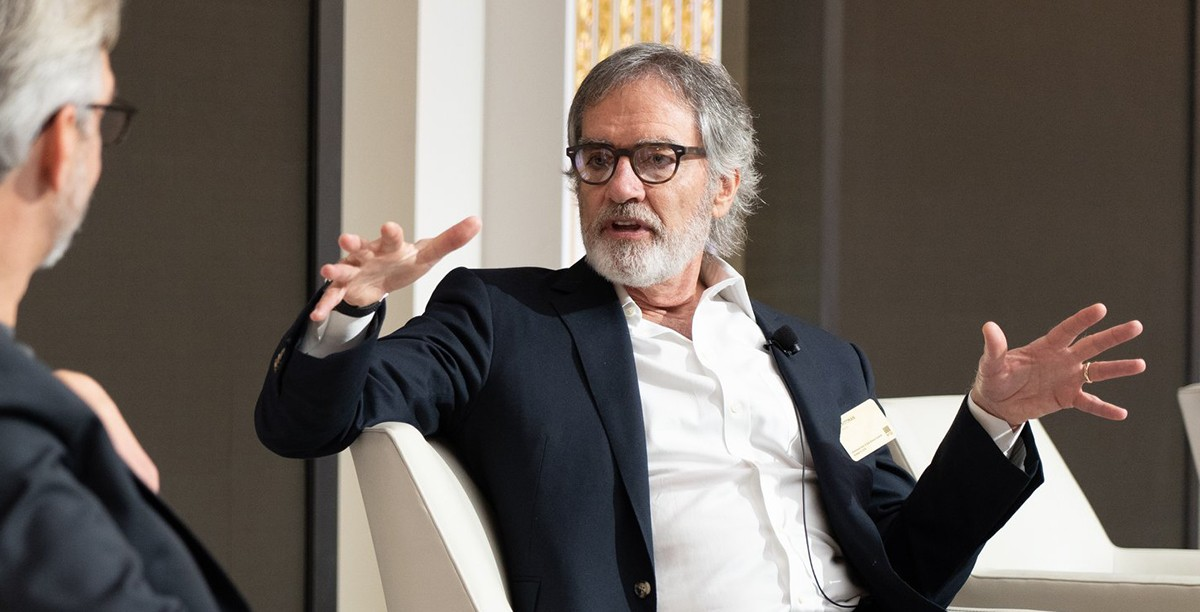
- Pittman at 2018 Interbrand Best Global Brands Summit
- Born: Robert Warren Pittman; December 28, 1953 (age 72); Jackson, Mississippi, U.S.
- Occupation: Businessman
- Known for: MTV iHeartMedia; AOL
- Spouse: Sandy Hill (m. 1979; div. 1997) Veronique Choa (m. 1997; div. 2024)
- Children: 3

Robert Warren Pittman (born December 28, 1953) is an American businessman. Pittman was the CEO of MTV Networks and the cofounder and programmer who led the team that created MTV, and is the CEO of iHeartMedia and the cofounder of Casa Dragones Tequila. Pittman joined iHeartMedia's predecessor company Clear Channel in November 2010 as an investor and the company's Chairman of Media and Entertainment Platforms, was named CEO in 2011 and chairman in 2013. Pittman led Clear Channel's transformation into iHeartMedia, Inc. in September 2014 to reflect its new multiplatform business and expanded mission. Pittman has also been the former chairman and CEO of Clear Channel Outdoor, CEO of AOL Networks, Six Flags Theme Parks, Quantum Media, Century 21 Real Estate and Time Warner Enterprises, and COO of America Online, Inc. and AOL Time Warner.

Pittman has also been a radio and TV programmer, marketer, investor and media entrepreneur who has had multiple careers in a number of consumer-focused industries. In giving him its first 'Media Visionary" award, advertising publication Adweek referred to him as a "jack of all media" and former MTV executive Tom Freston referred to him as "the wonder boy of branding".

== Biography ==
=== Early life ===
The son of a Methodist minister, Pittman was born in Jackson, Mississippi, but raised in Hattiesburg and Brookhaven, where he attended Brookhaven High School and became a radio announcer at age 15 to earn money for flying lessons. He was an announcer in a number of cities and then successfully programmed radio stations in Pittsburgh, Chicago (WMAQ AM 670 and WKQX FM) and finally at the NBC flagship station, WNBC (AM), in New York when he was 23. He also produced and co-hosted a music video and news show in 1978 that ran on NBC's O&O Television stations. He learned to fly and has been a pilot for almost 50 years: He now has over 6,000 flight hours, currently holds an Airline Transport Pilot's license for airplanes, and is rated for helicopters and three types of jets.

=== MTV Years ===
At Warner Amex, he oversaw the creation and growth of MTV and the transition of Nickelodeon from a failing network geared to preschoolers to the highest-rated channel aimed at older kids as well as the launches of VH-1 and Nick at Nite, and led the initial public offering for MTV Networks and its expansion into international markets. Under Pittman's leadership, MTV became the first profitable cable network; then-Warner Communications' Co-chairman and Co-Chief Executive Officer Steve Ross also noted that MTV became the most profitable basic cable network during Pittman's tenure there. During his tenure at MTV, the network was criticized harshly for its initial reluctance to play videos from African American artists. During Pittman's tenure, MTV responded to this criticism by Rick James by actively soliciting and championing videos by Black artists, including Michael Jackson and Tina Turner, and later launched Yo! MTV Raps to introduce rap music to the MTV audience. During Pittman's time at MTV the channel also launched what became an extremely successful live event business—broadcasting the entire groundbreaking Live Aid global concert for Ethiopian famine relief on June 13, 1985, and launching the MTV Video Music Awards show in 1984. For his development of the MTV brand, Advertising Age selected Pittman in 2010 as one of the ten most influential marketers who transformed American Culture. In 2023, Grunge Magazine named Pittman "One of the Unsung Heroes of Modern Pop Music," someone who made "contributions to popular music that were utterly, ridiculously game-changing" for his innovations to the music industry and popular culture as a co-founder of MTV. Pittman also received a 1984 Council of Fashion Designers of America (CFDA) Award in recognition of MTV's impact on fashion and popular culture.

=== Quantum Media and Time Warner ===
After MTV, Pittman founded Quantum Media with MCA (one of the company's ventures was the Morton Downey Jr. show, an early television shock talk show). The company was founded in 1986, and was initially bankrolled by MCA to handle the record labels of the company. As described in the October 15, 2020, episode of his podcast Math & Magic, in 1987 this joint venture company built an equity stake in the J. Walter Thompson advertising agency with the goal of acquiring the company, but after briefly discussing joining forces with Sir Martin Sorrell, founder of WPP, lost to him just as he was beginning to build his company. In 1989, Pittman bought out MCA, sold its assets to Warner Communications and became senior advisor to Warner Communications CEO Steve Ross just as Warner was merging with Time Inc. to create Time Warner. In 1990, Pittman was appointed president and CEO of Time Warner Enterprises, the new business group of Time Warner, and in 1991 became chairman and CEO of Six Flags Theme Parks where his team oversaw the revitalization of the Six Flags brand, taking attendance from 17 million to 25 million using a “classic second-place strategy” with their “Bigger than Disneyland, closer to home” positioning of the brand.

=== Century 21 Real Estate ===
After Pittman led a process that led to Time Warner selling a controlling interest in Six Flags to Boston Ventures in 1995, he left to join Century 21 Real Estate as CEO. Pittman and his team grew Century 21 Real Estate through a strategy that included brand-building and national marketing, a new franchise sales organization, and the early adoption of the Internet as a lead-generating tool.

=== America Online and AOL Time Warner ===
While at Century 21, Pittman met Steve Case and joined the board of directors of America Online, Inc.; he joined the company as president and CEO of AOL Networks in 1996 and later became president and COO of America Online Inc. While at AOL, Pittman led the operating team that moved AOL from 6 million members to over 30 million; took the company profitable; and continued the mission of making the Internet as easy for consumers to use as the telephone or television. During Pittman's tenure, AOL had almost 50% of all Internet traffic in the U.S. and pioneered the development of digital advertising. The company's most memorable ad of that time had the tagline “America Online: So easy to use, no wonder it’s number one”. After AOL merged with Time Warner in 2001, Pittman became the Co-COO (and eventually COO) of the combined AOL Time Warner before leaving the company in 2002.

=== Pilot Group ===
Pittman joined a number of his longtime operating team colleagues when he co-founded Pilot Group LLC, a private investment firm based New York in 2003. Pilot Group, which is no longer active, previously owned and sold investments including Thrillist, which is now part of Group Nine Media and in which Pilot Group is still a minority investor; DailyCandy, sold to Comcast Ventures for a reported $125 million; IdealBite, which was sold to the Walt Disney Company; and entertainment research company OTX (sold to Ipsos America). Pilot also owned and sold significant minority investments in David's Bridal and Nutrisystem, and owned and sold the Barrington Broadcasting television group to Sinclair Broadcast Group in 2013 for $370 million and its radio station group Double O Radio to a variety of regional radio station groups including Town Square Media. Pilot and Pittman have also held various minority positions in digital content and technology venture companies including social gaming company Zynga, in which Pilot was an early investor; Huffington Post and Facebook. In April 2018, Pilot Group sold its stake in Casa Dragones tequila brand to BDT Capital Partners LLC — Warren Buffett's banker—which is taking the lead investor role and providing capital to take Casa Dragones to the next level—although Pittman, as the co-founder, maintained his personal stake and remains on the board.

=== Clear Channel Media Holdings, Inc. and iHeartMedia, Inc. ===
In November 2010, Pittman took on the role of Chairman of Media and Entertainment Platforms for Clear Channel, and made a personal equity investment in the company. In this role, Pittman worked to leverage the company's media assets and spearhead the further development of a digital strategy for Clear Channel Radio, particularly for its iHeartRadio digital radio platform. At this time, the company was burdened with $20 billion in debt as the result of a 2008 leveraged buyout. In September 2014, Pittman led the company's transformation to iHeartMedia, Inc. to better reflect the company's multi-platform focus. Today Pittman is chairman and CEO of iHeartMedia, Inc., with multi-platform assets across broadcast radio; digital; podcasting; mobile; social; data; and live events. Under Pittman's leadership company debt was significantly reduced—from $16.1 billion to $5.75 billion—and the company emerged from restructuring in May 2019. At that time, T. Rowe Price referenced the company as one revived by disruptive change. In addition to being the number one audio company in America by reach, iHeartMedia, Inc. is the number one streaming radio company and now the number one podcast publisher globally. In October 2018 closed its acquisition of podcasting pioneer Stuff Media, LLC, the leading for-profit publisher of entertaining and informative podcast content, which includes the HowStuffWorks (HSW) brand and content. Pittman played a pivotal role in developing the iHeartRadio Music Festival, the biggest live concert festival in radio history, the first of which occurred in Las Vegas on September 23–24, 2011 along with the launch of the New iHeartRadio. The company has since expanded its national tentpole live events platform to include the nationally televised iHeartRadio Music Awards; the iHeartCountry Festival; iHeartRadio Fiesta Latina; the iHeartRadio Podcast Awards; iHeartRadio ALTer Ego and the iHeartRadio Jingle Ball Tour. In December 2016, the company launched its two new on demand subscription platforms, iHeartRadio Plus and iHeartRadio All Access.

In conjunction with this position, Pittman also maintains his role as Founding Member of Pilot Group and continues his activities as a venture investor; in an indication of his continued interest in emerging technologies and businesses, he also serves on the board of Cantina Labs, a social AI platform led by Sean Parker, cofounder of Facebook and Napster, that combines group chat, voice and video capabilities as well as AI character creation (formerly Airtime). With his return to radio, Huffington Postʽs media business expert Charles Warner dubbed him “best radio programmer ever” and in 2011 he was ranked by Radio Ink magazine as the "Most Powerful Man in Radio". "Never before has anyone taken the number one slot on the list in their inaugural year," stated Radio Ink Publisher/CEO B. Eric Rhoads. Pittman retained that designation in 2012, 2013, 2014, 2015, 2016, 2017, 2018, 2019, 2020, 2021, 2022, 2023 and 2024, and was also named Radio Ink's 2019 Radio Executive of the Year. In 2026, Pittman was selected for induction into the Museum of Broadcast Communications' Radio Hall of Fame

=== Recent years ===
Pittman is a philanthropist, building community and philanthropic projects into businesses he managed from Live Aid at MTV to educational efforts using the Internet at AOL. He is former chairman of the non-profit Robin Hood Foundation, which fights poverty in New York City, and still serves on the board; and is former chairman of the New York Public Theater. He is also on the boards of the Rock and Roll Hall of Fame and the Parker Institute for Cancer Immunotherapy and is a former board member of the non-profit Lupus Research Alliance, the New York City Ballet, the Smithsonian National Air and Space Museum, New York University Medical Center and the Corcoran Gallery of Art.

Pittman has also served on the boards of companies including Electronic Arts, Atari Games, Excite, 3DO, MTV Networks, America Online, HFS/Cendant/Realogy and AOL Time Warner.

Pittman was one of the minority owners of the New York Mets, holding a 4% stake in the baseball team, before selling his interest to Steven Cohen in 2020.

=== Awards and honors ===
Pittman's many honors include: Robert F. Kennedy Memorial's 2000 “Ripple of Hope Award” for his commitment to civic and community affairs and his contributions to the advancement of education; receiving the Broadcasters Foundation of America's 2016 'Golden Mike Award'; induction into the Advertising Hall of Fame and the Broadcasting and Cable Hall of Fame; received Adweek’s first Media Visionary award in 2013 and Cablevision Magazine's "20/20 Vision" award for the 20 people who have had the greatest impact on the cable industry; selection as one of Advertising Age’s "10 Marketers Who Changed American Culture” and "50 Pioneers and Visionaries of TV" and recognition as one of Business Week magazine's Top 25 Executives of 1998. He was also named one of Life magazine's "Five Original Thinkers of the '80s"; recognized as the eighth of Life magazine's "50 Most Influential Boomers"; included in Time magazine's 1984 Man-of-the-Year issue "Seven Others who Succeeded"; received the "Star of Hope Award” in January 2014 from the Community Foundation of Northwest Mississippi; was named Success Magazine’s “Pioneer of the New American Start-Up” in 1989; received the 1986 White House Conference on Small Business Award for Entrepreneurial Excellence and the 1984 Council of Fashion Designers of America award; Performance Magazine’s 1982 “Innovator of the Year” award for his work developing MTV and Billboard Magazine’s “Radio Program Manager of the Year” in 1977. In October 2012, he was awarded the Henry A. Grunwald Award for Public Service by Lighthouse International. He also received the American Academy of Achievement’s Golden Plate Award in 1990; International Teleproduction Society’s Lifetime Achievement International Monitor Award and The President's Award and an Honorary Doctorate from Bank Street College of Education, the school's highest honor, for his many contributions to the advancement of education.

=== "Math & Magic" podcast ===
On May 4th, 2019, Pittman announced his podcast "Math & Magic: Stories from the Frontiers of Marketing." The show is produced by iHeartRadio.

=== Personal life ===
Pittman married Sandy Hill, a merchandise editor at Mademoiselle, in July 1979; they divorced in 1997. They have one son. Pittman married Veronique Choa in 1997. Divorced in 2024, they have two children.

Business positions
Preceded by Barry Schuler	CEO of AOL; 2002	Succeeded by Jonathan Miller
