= DailyCandy =

Online media company

- Founded: 2000
- Founder: Dany Levy
- Defunct: 2014
- Headquarters: New York City, New York
- Website: dailycandy.com

DailyCandy was an online media company founded in 2000 by Dany Levy. The business originally consisted of a daily email newsletter that provided readers with information about hip and trendy events and businesses in their city. The emails first focused on New York City but eventually grew to include a dozen US cities and London. In August 2008, Comcast purchased the e-newsletter for $125 million and ultimately shut it down in 2014.

DailyCandy was a pioneer in terms of using the Internet as a distribution channel and in creating an email newsletter business. It inspired a number of similar email businesses including, Thrillist and Tasting Table.

A number of notable brands, including Drybar and Nasty Gal, launched via being spotlighted in DailyCandy newsletters.

== Founding ==
In the 1990s, Dany Levy was a staff writer for various magazines such as New York Magazine and Jane. Having grown frustrated with the long lead times of the traditional magazine business, Levy quit her job and set out to create a daily newsletter targeting young, urban women. Levy has said that she somewhat modelled DailyCandy after TheStreet.

On March 6, 2000, Dani Levy sent out the first edition of DailyCandy. At this time, the company was based out of Levy's West Village apartment. The initial recipient list consisted of 700 people, mostly journalist friends and people in Levy's personal rolodex.

By 2003, the subscriber list had grown to 285,000 people, and Bob Pittman, the former president and COO of AOL, bought controlling interest for $3 million.

In 2005, at DailyCandy's peak, The New York Times deemed the newsletter as being "the undisputed grande dame of style sites".

By 2008, the subscriber list had grown to over 2.5 million people and the company was earning $25 million in revenue. Comcast offered to purchase DailyCandy for $125 million, and the deal was finalized on September 12, 2008.

In 2014, NBCUniversal, the Comcast division that then controlled the company, shut down DailyCandy.
