= Byron Trott =

American merchant banker (born 1958)

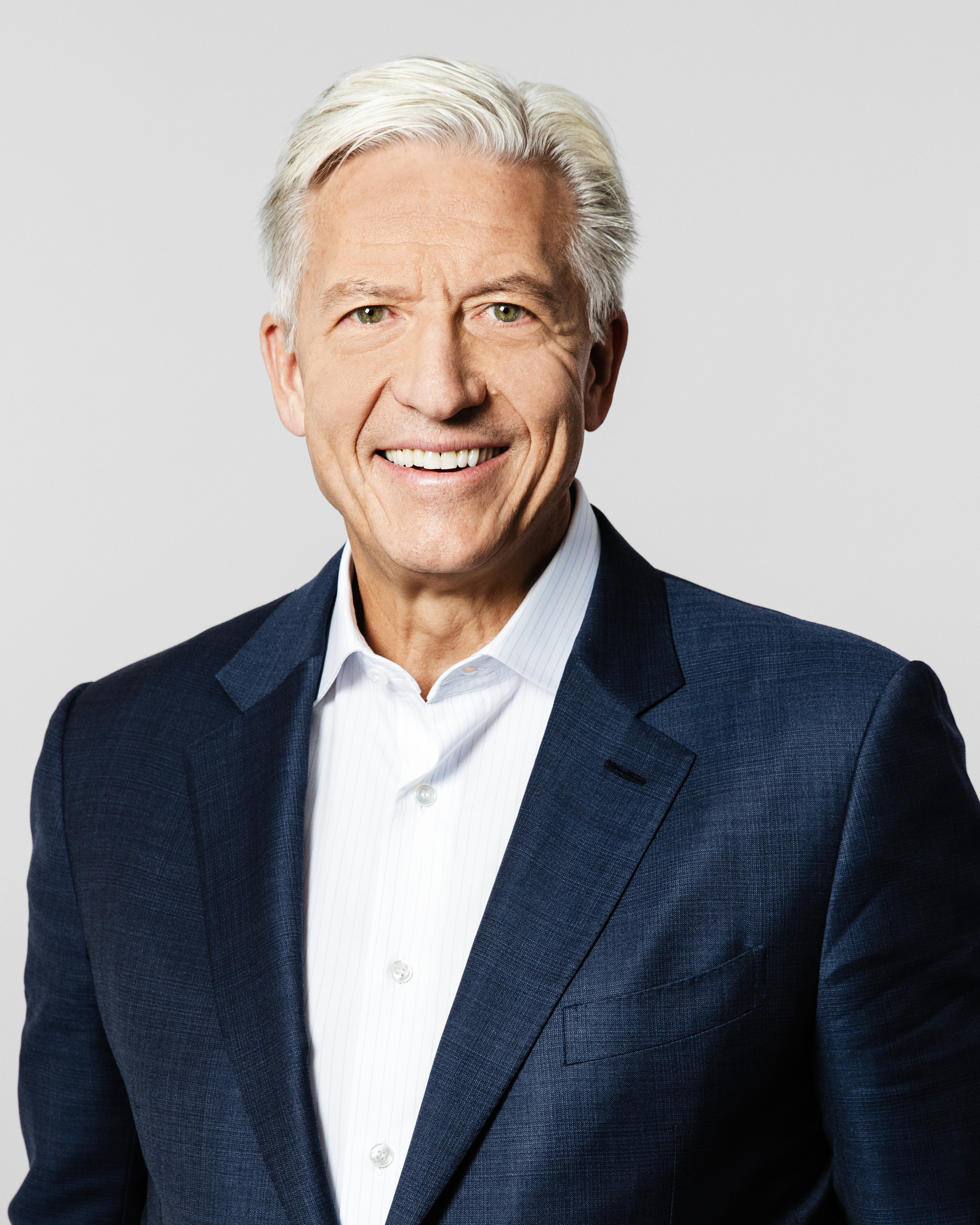
- Byron Trott
- Born: December 2, 1958 (age 67); Springfield, Missouri, United States
- Education: University of Chicago (AB, MBA)
- Title: Chairman and co-CEO of BDT & MSD Partners
- Spouse: Tina Trott

Byron David Trott (born December 2, 1958) is an American investment banker who is the founder, chairman and co-CEO of BDT & MSD Partners, a merchant bank that provides advice and capital to family and founder-led companies. Formerly, Trott was vice chairman of investment banking at Goldman Sachs.

== Early life and education ==
Raised in Union, Missouri, Trott received an AB from the University of Chicago in 1981, and an MBA from the University of Chicago Booth School of Business in 1982. As an undergraduate, he played on the varsity baseball and football teams, and joined the Chi Upsilon chapter of Phi Gamma Delta. Trott was the 1981 recipient of the Amos Alonzo Stagg Medal, an award presented to the senior male student-athlete at the University of Chicago with the best overall record for academics, athletics and character.

== Professional career ==
In 1982, Trott joined Goldman Sachs as a stockbroker, joining Goldman's investment banking division in 1988 and working under future U.S. Treasury Secretary Henry Paulson. He eventually rose to become vice chairman of investment banking at Goldman Sachs. He advised many of the wealthiest families and closely held companies in deals ranging from the $23 billion Mars-Wrigley combination, the Pritzkers’ $4.5 billion sale of Marmon Holdings to Berkshire Hathaway, and the $5 billion capital infusion from Berkshire Hathaway into Goldman Sachs in September 2008 during the financial crisis.

Trott left Goldman Sachs in early 2009 to open his own firm, Chicago-based merchant bank BDT & Company. BDT & Co.’s affiliate, BDT Capital Partners, managed more than $33 billion across its investment funds from its global limited partner investor base.

In 2023, BDT & Company merged with MSD Partners, run by Gregg Lemkau. Trott and Lemkau had previously worked together at Goldman Sachs. Together, they formed BDT & MSD Partners, an investment and advisory firm. Trott and Lemkau serve as co-CEOs of BDT & MSD.

Trott is a director of Cox Enterprises, Enterprise Holdings, Inc., IMA Group and Sunrise Group Holdings, LLC (“Whataburger”).

== Personal life ==
Trott is a trustee of the University of Chicago, founded the Jeff Metcalf Internship Program and helped to launch the Trott Business Program, which provides undergraduate UChicago students with practical work experience and mentoring. Trott is a director of Conservation International, and in 2011 was inducted into the Horatio Alger Association of Distinguished Americans and is now president of the Association.

In 2018, Byron and Tina Trott founded the rootEd Alliance, which places college and career counselors in high schools in rural America. They signed The Giving Pledge in 2021.
