= John C. Phelan =

American businessman and government official (born 1964)

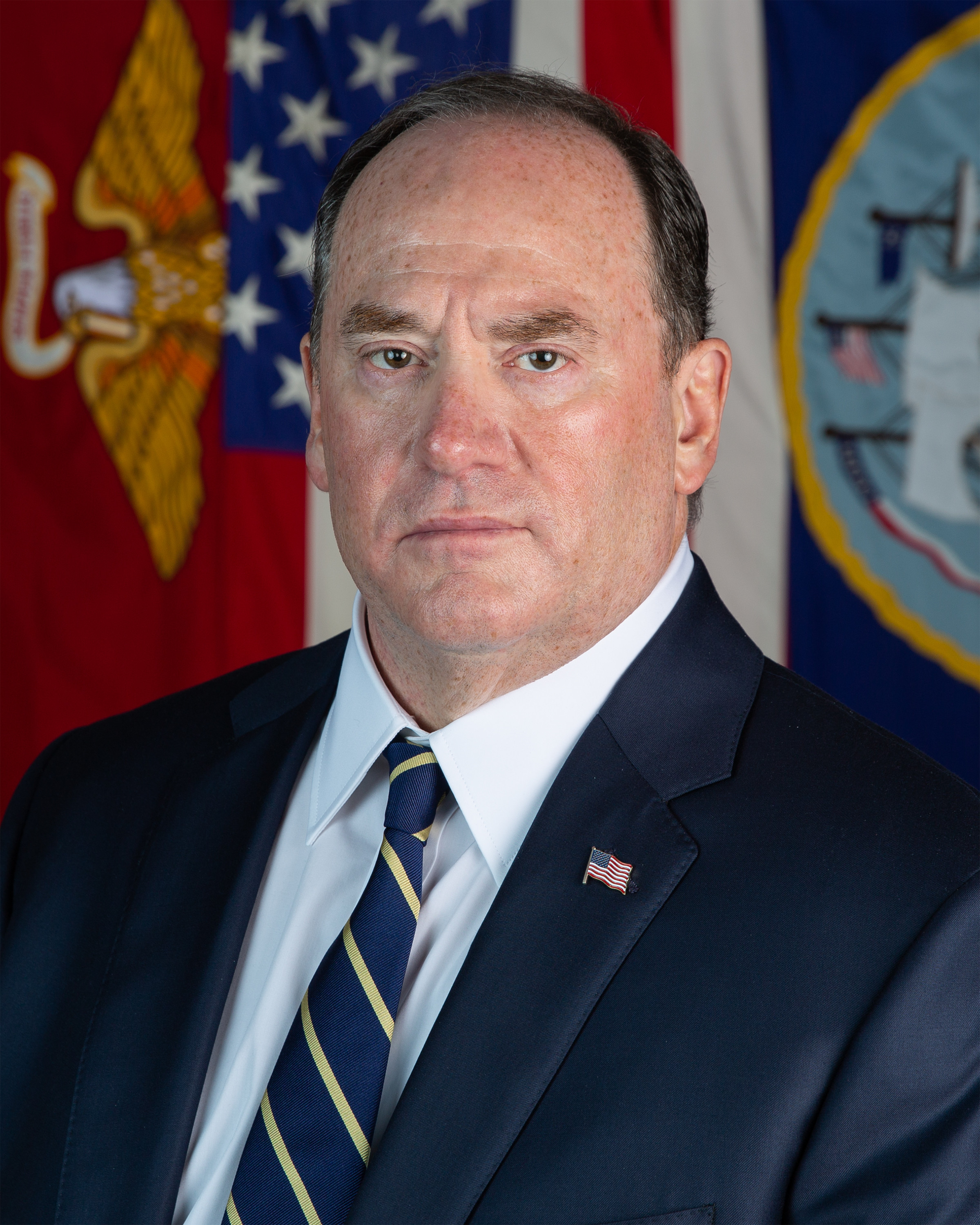
- Official portrait, 2025

79th United States Secretary of the Navy
- In office March 25, 2025 – April 22, 2026
- President: Donald Trump
- Deputy: Victor Minella (acting); Brett A. Seidle (acting); Hung Cao
- Preceded by: Carlos Del Toro
- Succeeded by: Hung Cao (acting)

Personal details
- Born: 1964 (age 61–62)
- Party: Republican
- Children: 1
- Education: Southern Methodist University (BA); Harvard University (MBA)

John Cartwright Phelan (born 1964) is an American businessman and political donor who served as the United States secretary of the Navy from 2025 to 2026. Phelan worked for several firms during his career in finance before co-founding MSD Capital. He then founded Rugger Management. He helped fundraising for Donald Trump's presidential campaigns before being appointed as Secretary of the Navy.

== Early life and education ==
John Cartwright Phelan was born in 1964.

Phelan earned a bachelor's degree in economics and political science, with distinction from Southern Methodist University in Dallas, Texas, in 1986. While he was an undergraduate, he took economics and international relations curriculum at the London School of Economics. He went on to earn an MBA from Harvard Business School, in 1990.

== Career ==
=== Business ===
Phelan worked as an investment banking analyst at Goldman Sachs, and then in acquisitions in the Zell-Merrill Lynch Real Estate Opportunity Funds. He was then a principal for seven years at ESL Partners responsible for Special Situation and Distressed Investments.

In 1998 Phelan became the co-founding partner and chief investment officer of MSD Capital, a private investment company established to manage the capital of Michael Dell.

In 2022, Phelan resigned as CEO of MSD and founded Rugger Management LLC, a private investment company based in Palm Beach, Florida.

=== Fundraising ===
The Phelans regularly host fundraising events at their homes in Palm Beach and Aspen. In 2022, they hosted a fundraiser for amfAR, a foundation for AIDS research, that raised $5.3 million.

In August 2024, the Phelans hosted a private fundraising dinner for then-former president Donald Trump, who was seeking a second term in office; the guests, who included Steve Wynn, Thomas Peterffy, Greg Abbott, Byron Donalds, Lauren Boebert and Cory Gardner, donated between $25,000 and $500,000 apiece.

FEC records show that in 2024, a "'John W. Phelan'[sic.] of MSD Capital in Palm Beach donated $834,600 to Trump’s joint fundraising committee..." and that earlier, a "'John C. Phelan'" of MSD Capital in Palm Beach donated $93,300".

=== Relationship with Jeffrey Epstein ===
Passenger manifests released as part of the Epstein files indicate that Phelan flew twice on the plane of Jeffrey Epstein several months before Epstein's first arrest on sex charges. The first flight took place on February 27, 2006, from New York’s John F. Kennedy International Airport to London Luton Airport. The manifest for the second flight, from London to New York on March 3, 2006, indicates that Phelan flew with 12 other passengers, including Epstein, modeling agent and Epstein associate Jean-Luc Brunel, and six people whose names are redacted on the version of the manifest released in October 2025 by the United States House Committee on Oversight and Government Reform.

== Secretary of the Navy (2025-2026) ==
On November 27, 2024, president-elect Trump announced Phelan as his nominee-to-be for United States Secretary of the Navy. Some defense experts noted his lack of experience with the Navy, the military, national-security policy, and the defense industry. "Not all service secretaries come into the office with prior military experience, but he'd be the first in the Navy since 2006," the Associated Press reported. Phelan testified before the United States Senate Committee on Armed Services on February 27, 2025. He was confirmed with bipartisan support by a vote of 62–30 on March 24, 2025, and sworn in as the 79th Secretary of the Navy the next day.

On April 21, 2026, Phelan presented on use of artificial intelligence by the United States Department of Defense and achieving recruiting targets. On April 22, following intense clashes with the Department of Defense over naval shipbuilding strategies and management protocols, Secretary of Defense Pete Hegseth told Phelan to resign or be fired. Phelan declined to resign and was consequently fired. Pentagon spokesperson Sean Parnell issued a statement saying that Phelan was departing immediately. Phelan was succeeded by Hung Cao, current Under Secretary of the Navy, as the Acting Secretary of the Navy. Phelan had promoted the Trump-class battleship, which Hegseth saw as a distraction from his strategy of smaller, uncrewed ships which increased animosity between the two. Phelan had a closer relationship with Trump than Pentagon leaders expected. Hegseth had already fired Jon Harrison, Phelan's chief of staff, in October 2025.

== Personal life ==
In 2000, Phelan met his future wife Amy on a blind date. A former cheerleader for the Dallas Cowboys, Amy was working as a management services and systems engineering consultant in Dallas. They have a daughter who is a New York City–based artist and socialite.

John and Amy Phelan own a house in Aspen, Colorado, valued at $38 million; a house in Palm Beach, Florida, valued over $100 million; and an apartment on Park Avenue in New York City.

They have an art collection worth millions of dollars; their Florida house holds works by Andy Warhol and Willem de Kooning.

Political offices
Preceded by Carlos Del Toro	United States Secretary of the Navy; 2025–2026	Succeeded by Hung Cao; Acting
