= Gregg Lemkau =

American business executive

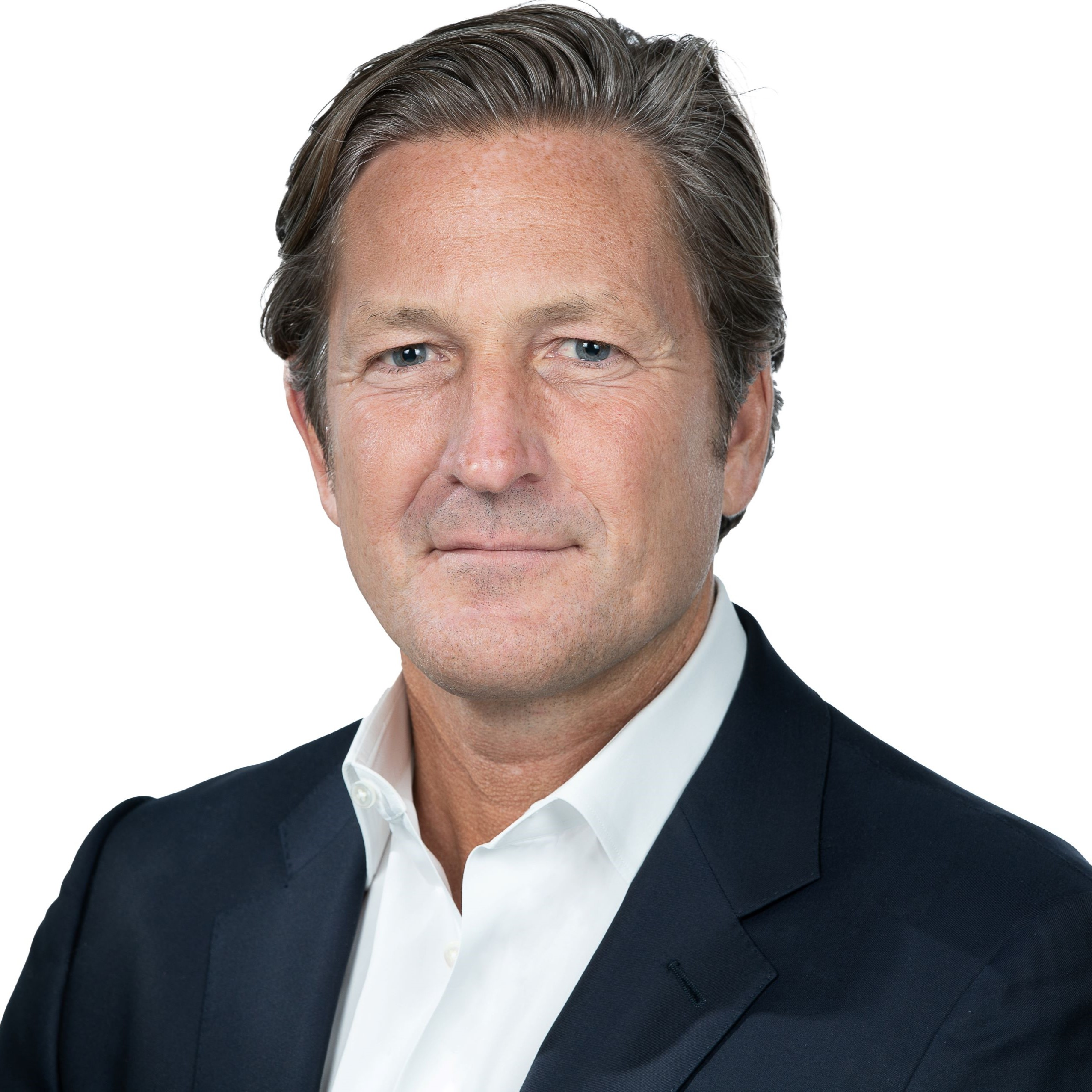
- Born: 1969 (age 56–57); Boston, Massachusetts, United States
- Education: Dartmouth College
- Occupation: Businessman
- Known for: Co-CEO of BDT & MSD Partners
- Board member of: BlackRock
- Spouse: Kate Lemkau
- Children: 4
- Parents: Curt William Lemkau (father); Susan Carroll Lemkau (mother)

Gregg Lemkau is an American businessman, who was born in 1969, is the co-CEO of BDT & MSD Partners, a merchant bank that provides advice and capital to family and founder-led companies. Additionally, he is the chairman of DFO Management, the office of Dell Technologies’ Michael Dell and his family, and since early 2026 is Board member of BlackRock.

Previously, Lemkau was CEO of MSD Partners, a predecessor firm of BDT & MSD Partners, and he spent 28 years in various roles and leadership positions at Goldman Sachs.

== Trajectory ==
Lemkau was born in Boston in 1969. His father, Curt Lemkau (d. 2013), also worked in finance. Lemkau attended Dartmouth College, where he played as a goalkeeper for the soccer team. After graduating in 1991, he briefly worked as a paralegal at Skadden, Arps, Slate, Meagher & Flom, before transitioning to investment banking.

He joined Goldman Sachs as an analyst in 1992 at the age of 22 and relocated to San Francisco during the 1990s to help expand the firm's technology mergers and acquisitions (M&A) business. Over a 28-year tenure at the bank, Lemkau rose through the leadership ranks, eventually being named co-head of global investment banking in 2017. During his time at Goldman, he worked closely with prominent technology figures such as Elon Musk, Travis Kalanick, Marc Benioff, and Daniel Ek, and led the firm’s significant investments in Facebook and Spotify.

Notably, he advised Michael Dell on the 2013 transaction to take Dell Technologies private and later collaborated on the company's return to the public market in 2018.

In 2020, Lemkau left Goldman Sachs to join MSD Partners, the investment firm managing the capital of Michael Dell and his family, serving as the firm's CEO. In this capacity, he was tasked with diversifying the company's investment portfolio and exploring new sectors. In 2023, MSD Partners merged with BDT & Company, a merchant bank led by Lemkau's former Goldman Sachs colleague Byron Trott, to form BDT & MSD Partners. Lemkau and Trott serve as co-CEOs of the combined entity, which provides advisory services and capital to family- and founder-led businesses.

Additionally, Lemkau serves as the chairman of DFO Management, the Dell family office, and in early 2026, he was appointed to the board of directors of BlackRock.

== Personal life ==
Lemkau is married. He and his wife, Kate, have four children.

He also served on the board of directors of Grassroot Soccer, which fights HIV/AIDS in Africa.

In 2015, Gregg and Kate Lemkau donated $2 million to Dartmouth to establish the Bobby Clark Head Coach of Men's Soccer position.
