= Hung Cao =

American politician (born 1971)

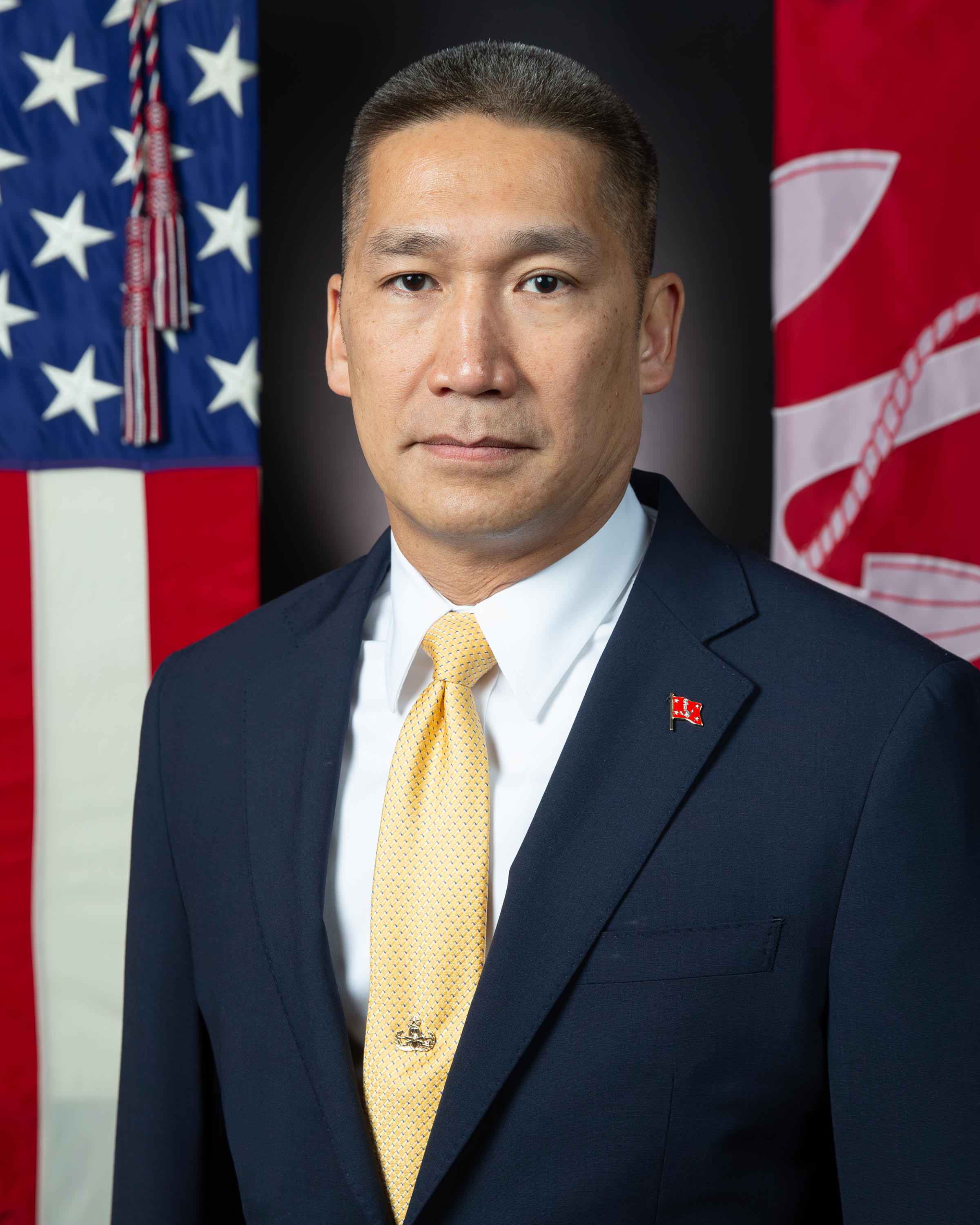
- Official portrait, 2025

Acting United States Secretary of the Navy
- Incumbent
- Assumed office April 22, 2026
- President: Donald Trump
- Preceded by: John C. Phelan

35th United States Under Secretary of the Navy
- Incumbent
- Assumed office October 3, 2025
- President: Donald Trump
- Preceded by: Erik Raven

Personal details
- Born: Cao Hùng; 3 August 1971 (age 55) Saigon, South Vietnam
- Party: Republican
- Spouse: April Cao
- Children: 5
- Education: United States Naval Academy (BS); Naval Postgraduate School (MS)

Military service
- Allegiance: United States
- Branch/service: United States Navy
- Years of service: 1989–2021
- Rank: Captain
- Battles/wars: Afghan War; Iraq War; Somali Civil War

Hung Cao (born 1971) is an American politician and former naval officer who has served as Under Secretary of the Navy since 2025. After the resignation of Secretary of the Navy John C. Phelan in April 2026, he became acting secretary; he has been nominated by President Donald Trump to take the role permanently. Cao has been the Republican Party's nominee in two Virginia elections: for the 10th congressional district in 2022 and for the Senate in 2024.

== Early life and career ==
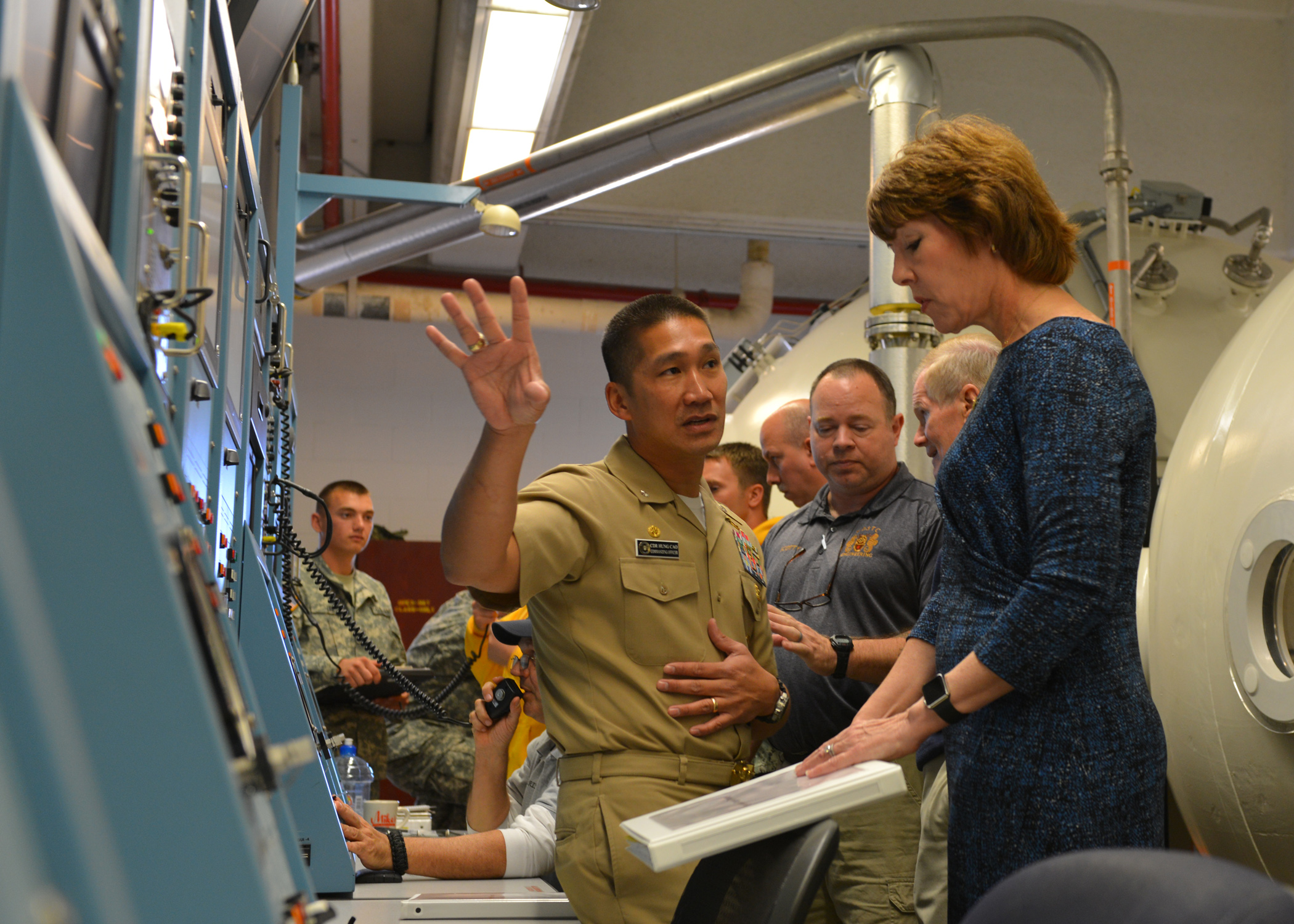
Cao as commanding officer of the Naval Diving and Salvage Training Center in 2015

Hung Cao (Vietnamese: Cao Hùng) was born in 1971 in Saigon, South Vietnam. His father, Quan Cao (Vietnamese: Cao Quản), was a native of Quảng Trị province who studied in the Philippines on a scholarship from the Rockefeller Foundation, earned a Ph.D. at Cornell University, and worked in the Ministry of Agriculture of South Vietnam, later serving as an assistant to the deputy prime minister. In 1975, shortly before the fall of Saigon, the Cao family fled to the United States. They spent some time in Niger because Cao's father, by then an agricultural specialist at USAID, was posted there.

Cao graduated from Thomas Jefferson High School for Science and Technology in 1989, as part of the first class to do so, and joined the U.S. Navy. During his years of active duty, he was deployed to Iraq, Afghanistan, and Somalia. A specialist in ordnance disposal and salvage diving, he obtained Navy Diving Officer and Explosive Ordnance Disposal Warfare Officers Badges, led recovery of the bodies of John F. Kennedy Jr., Carolyn Bessette, and Lauren Bessette after their plane crash off Martha's Vineyard, and was commanding officer of the Naval Diving and Salvage Training Center, near Naval Support Activity Panama City, from September 2013 to June 2016. He obtained a bachelor's degree in ocean engineering from the United States Naval Academy in 1996 and a Master of Science in Applied Physics from the Naval Postgraduate School in 2008.

Cao retired as a captain in 2021 and was hired as a vice president at CACI, a U.S. government contractor that provides services for defense, intelligence, and homeland security agencies.

In June 2024, Cao and his wife, April, published Call Me an American: Refugee to Patriot: Lessons Learned for a Strong America. The book recounts Cao's childhood and military service and shares his views on patriotism and citizenship.

== Congressional elections ==
=== 2022 House bid ===
Cao was one of 11 candidates in the Republican primary of the 2022 election for Virginia's 10th congressional district. He placed first by about 2,800 votes, advancing to the general election against Democratic incumbent Jennifer Wexton.

Cao was considered a strong candidate in a district that is the home of many Asian Americans and military families. He expressed support for the deregulation of government across nearly all facets of life, and his anti-abortion and pro-gun rights stances were targeted by Wexton as being too "extreme" for the district. He lost the election 53% to 47%. (Note: Attributed to multiple sources:)

=== 2024 Senate bid ===
In July 2023, Cao entered the Republican primary for the following year's Senate election in Virginia. Receiving endorsement by former President Donald Trump, he comfortably won, receiving 61.8% of the vote in a five-candidate race. In the general election, he was defeated by Democratic incumbent Tim Kaine by a margin of 54% to 45%.

In an interview during the campaign for the primary, Cao feared that "witchcraft" could intrude into Virginia, as it allegedly had in Monterey, California, and called himself an African American because of his time in Niger. In other media appearances, he claimed, as he did during his 2022 campaign, that he has lasting injuries from enemy fire. An investigation by USA Today found that he was awarded neither the Purple Heart nor the Combat Action Ribbon, both of them normally given to service members in these circumstances.

== Department of the Navy ==
=== Under Secretary of the Navy (2025–present) ===
On February 28, 2025, President Donald Trump nominated Cao for the position of Under Secretary of the Navy. Cao was confirmed by the Senate on October 1 by a margin of 52-45, with Republican Lisa Murkowski joining every Democrat present in rejecting the nomination, and was sworn in by Secretary of Defense Pete Hegseth on October 3. He was rarely involved in decisions made by the Department of the Navy and was forbidden from attending meetings on behalf of Secretary of the Navy John C. Phelan.

=== Acting Secretary of the Navy (2026–present) ===
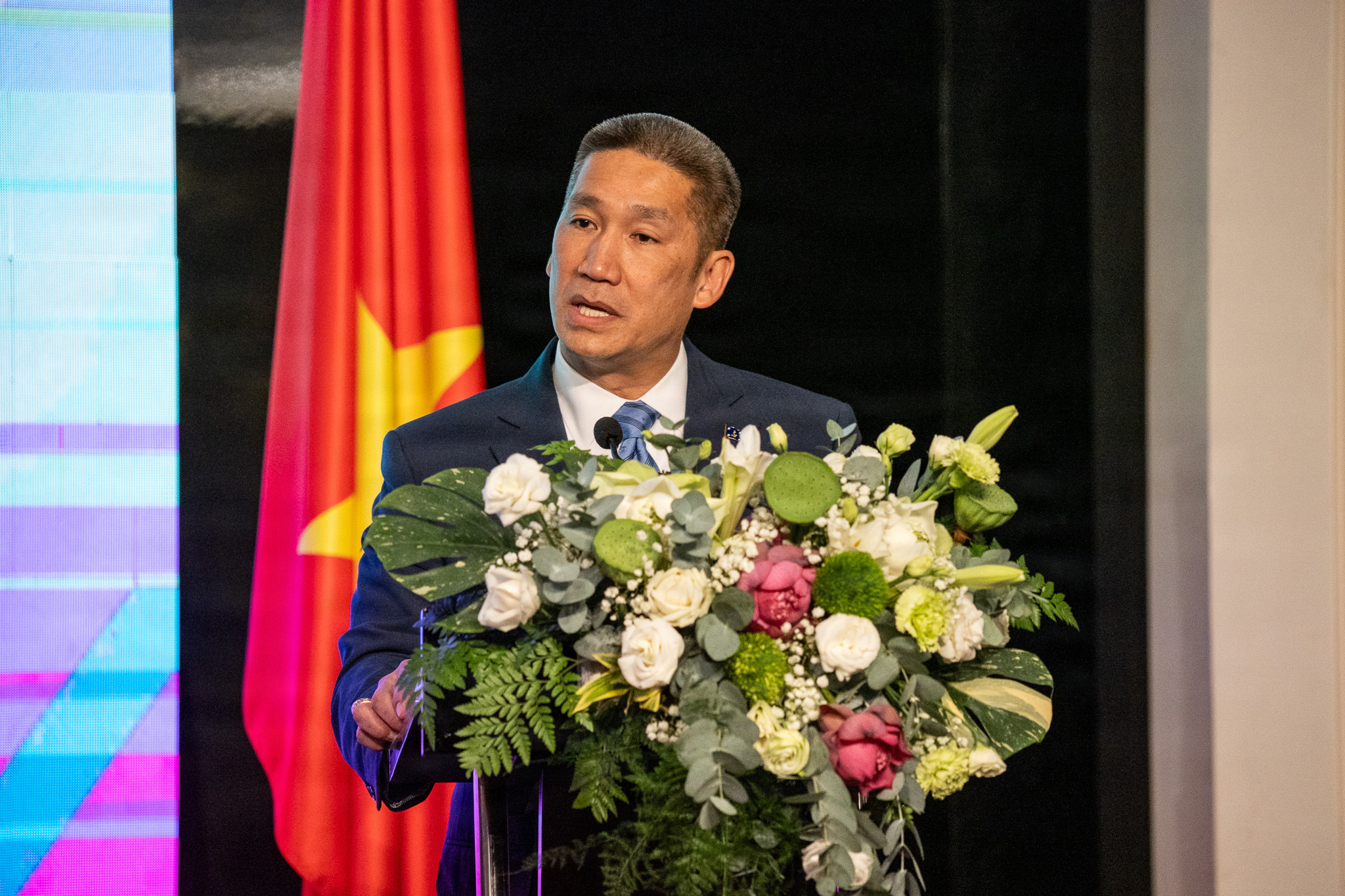
Cao visiting Vietnam in 2026

On April 22, 2026, Phelan resigned; as Under Secretary, Cao replaced him on an interim basis. Cao took charge during the Iran War.

On July 21, 2026, Cao awarded the Navy Unit Commendation to the crew of the USS Charlotte, credited with sinking Iranian warship IRIS Dena.

USS Abraham Lincoln, which had left its home port of Naval Air Station North Island on November 21, 2025, also became involved in the war, extending its deployment for many months. Politicians and families of the ship's crew became concerned about reports of deteriorating mental health, including suicide attempts by jumping overboard. On August 6, 2026, Cao attended two town halls with family members, revealing that the Abraham Lincoln would be relieved by the USS Theodore Roosevelt. On August 14, he released a statement that acknowledged the stresses the crew faced but called media coverage "dishonest".

On September 1, 2026, Trump nominated Cao to serve permanently as Navy Secretary. A 2021 U.S. law requires that nominees for military secretaries must have been retired from the military for at least seven years. Captain Cao retired in October 2021 and will not be eligible without a congressional waiver until 2028.

On September 9, 2026, Cao admitted that Naval Support Activity Bahrain had been heavily damaged by Iran in February 2026 and that the situation limited the Navy's ability to support USS Abraham Lincoln during its deployment. He also stated that the Navy would not be returning to the base "anytime soon." The Pentagon had previously denied any impact on the base and its facilities.

Cao spoke at an October 6, 2026, event at Sparrow's Point in Baltimore to announce a $7-billion Navy contract awarded to Anduril Industries. In comments directed to global interests, Cao said "Piss us off [and] we’ll sneak into your country in the middle of the night and snatch you and your wife while you sleep in your beds.”

== Personal life ==
Cao and his wife, April Lakata Cao, have two sons and three daughters: one adopted from Thailand and a pair of twins. All of their children have been homeschooled by April. The Caos live in Purcellville, Virginia, and attend Cornerstone Chapel in Leesburg.

== Military awards ==
Cao's decorations, awards, and badges are:

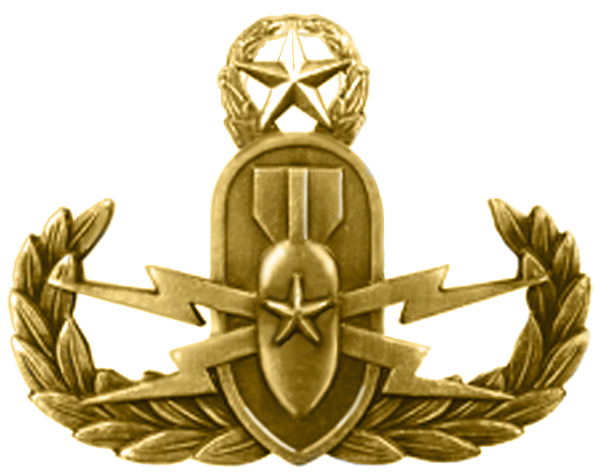

Badge	Explosive Ordnance Disposal Officer		
1st Row	Defense Superior Service Medal	Bronze Star Medal	
2nd Row	Meritorious Service Medal	Joint Service Commendation Medal	Navy Commendation Medal with two gold stars
3rd Row	Army Commendation Medal	Navy Achievement Medal with three gold stars	Joint Meritorious Unit Award
4th Row	Navy Unit Commendation ribbon	Coast Guard Unit Commendation with silver O	Meritorious Unit Commendation ribbon
5th Row	Navy E Ribbon with two silver E's	National Defense Service Medal with one bronze star	Iraq Campaign Medal with three bronze stars
6th Row	Global War on Terrorism Expeditionary Medal	Global War on Terrorism Service Medal	Humanitarian Service Medal
7th Row	Military Outstanding Volunteer Service Medal	Navy Sea Service Deployment Ribbon with four bronze stars	Navy Overseas Service Ribbon
8th Row	NATO Medal	Navy Marksmanship Rifle Medal with silver E	Navy Marksmanship Pistol Medal with silver E
Badge	Master Explosive Ordnance Disposal Insignia (United States Navy)		

== Electoral history ==
=== 2022 ===
2022 Virginia 10th district GOP firehouse primary
Candidate	Round 1		Round 2		Round 3		Round 4		Round 5		Round 6		Round 7		Round 8		Round 9	
Candidate	Votes	%	Votes	%	Votes	%	Votes	%	Votes	%	Votes	%	Votes	%	Votes	%	Votes	%
Hung Cao	6,363	42%	6,379	42.1%	6,393	42.2%	6,471	42.8%	6,562	43.5%	6,672	44.4%	6,998	46.6%	7,238	48.7%	7,729	52.3%
Jeanine Lawson	4,373	28.9%	4,382	30%	4,390	29%	4,433	29.3%	4,503	29.8%	4,564	30.4%	4,693	31.2%	4,800	32.3%	5,000	33.8%
Brandon Michon	1,538	10.2%	1,551	10.2%	1,555	10.3%	1,588	10.5%	1,612	10.7%	1,614	10.7%	1,733	11.5%	1,854	12.5%	2,052	13.9%
Mike Clancy	719	4.7%	721	4.8%	724	4.8%	739	4.9%	764	5.1%	794	6.3%	876	5.8%	979	6.6%	Eliminated	
Caleb Max	621	4.1%	623	4.1%	627	4.1%	646	4.3%	678	4.5%	707	4.7%	727	4.8%	Eliminated			
John Henley	612	4%	614	4.1%	619	4.1%	628	4.2%	641	4.2%	676	4.5%	Eliminated					
Dave Beckwith	308	2%	308	2%	312	2.1%	328	2.2%	333	2.2%	Eliminated							
Theresa Ellis	259	1.7%	262	1.7%	276	1.8%	285	1.9%	Eliminated									
John Beatty	232	1.5%	232	1.5%	237	1.6%	Eliminated											
Jeff Mayhugh	64	0.4%	66	0.4%	Eliminated													
Brooke Taylor	56	0.4%	Eliminated															

2022 Virginia's 10th Congressional District election
Party	Candidate	Votes	%	±%
Democratic	Jennifer Wexton (incumbent)	157,405	53.15%	−3.35%
Republican	Hung Cao	138,163	46.65%	+3.25%
Write-in		577	0.19%	+.09%
Total votes		296,145		
Democratic hold				

=== 2024 ===
2024 Virginia Republican U.S. Senate Primary Results
Party	Candidate	Votes	%
Republican	Hung Cao	166,737	61.7%
Republican	Scott Parkinson	29,623	11.0%
Republican	Eddie Garcia	27,403	10.1%
Republican	Chuck Smith	23,603	8.7%
Republican	Jonathan Emord	22,909	8.5%
Total votes		270,275	100.0%

United States Senate election in Virginia, 2024
Party	Candidate	Votes	%	±%
Democratic	Tim Kaine (incumbent)	2,417,115	54.37%	−2.63%
Republican	Hung Cao	2,019,911	45.44%	+4.43%
Write-in		8,509	0.19%	+0.04%
Total votes		4,445,535	100.00%	N/A
Democratic hold				

== Notes ==
Party political offices
Preceded by Corey Stewart	Republican nominee for U.S. Senator from Virginia (Class 1); 2024	Most recent
Political offices
Preceded by Brett Seidle; Acting	United States Under Secretary of the Navy; 2025–present	Incumbent
Preceded by John Phelan	United States Secretary of the Navy; Acting; 2026–present	Incumbent
