= Casa Dragones =

Mexican brand of tequila

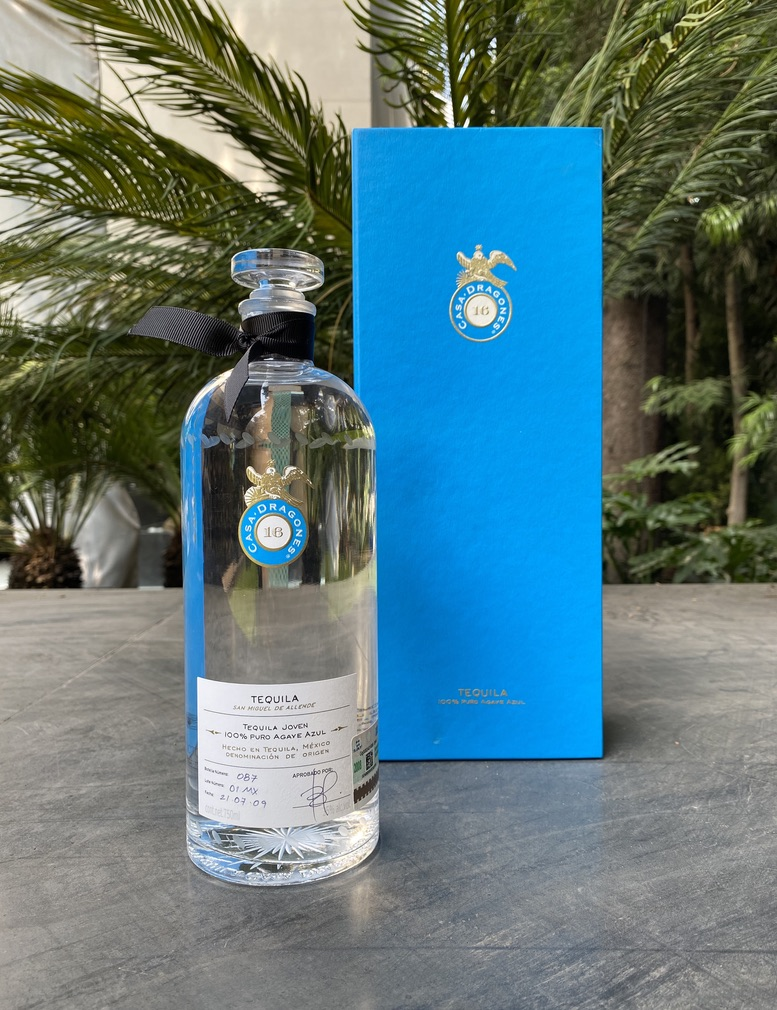
- Type: Ultra-Premium Tequila
- Origin: Tequila, Mexico
- Introduced: 2009 in United States
- Proof (US): 80
- Variants: Casa Dragones Joven, Casa Dragones Blanco, Casa Dragones Barrel Blend, Casa Dragones Reposado Mizunara
- Website: casadragones.com

Casa Dragones is a small batch tequila brand from San Miguel de Allende, Mexico. It was founded in 2009 by Bertha González Nieves, the first woman to be certified as ‘Maestra Tequilera’ by the Academia Mexicana de Catadores de Tequila, the organization recognized by The Tequila Regulatory Council, and MTV creator and iHeartMedia (iHeartradio) CEO Robert W. Pittman.

== History ==
Casa Dragones is named after the Dragones from San Miguel de Allende: a cavalry led by Ignacio Allende that eventually helped spark the independence movement from the Spanish, which led to the Mexican War of Independence.

Although made in Jalisco, Casa Dragones is based in San Miguel de Allende. The original stables of the Dragones cavalry, now called La Casa Dragones, is located at Recreo, 16, in San Miguel de Allende.

Casa Dragones originally only produced one blend, 'Tequila Casa Dragones Joven', but 5 years later, in 2014, they launched 'Tequila Casa Dragones Blanco'. Their latest product, 'Tequila Casa Dragones Barrel Blend' was launched in June 2020. In 2022, Casa Dragones launched its 4th expression, Casa Dragones Reposado Mizunara.

== Tequilas ==
Casa Dragones is classified as a 100% Blue Agave tequila, and offers four types of ultra-premium tequilas: Casa Dragones Joven, Casa Dragones Blanco, Casa Dragones Añejo Barrel Blend, and Casa Dragones Reposado Mizunara.

Released in 2009, Casa Dragones Joven is a blend of 100% Blue Agave new silver tequila and extra-aged tequila, rested in new American Oak barrels to naturally create a complex taste for sipping.

Casa Dragones Blanco was released in 2014 and is a 100% Blue Agave silver tequila, produced without aging, to deliver the unaltered taste of agave.

Casa Dragones Añejo Barrel Blend, is 100% Blue Agave Añejo tequila matured in two different custom-made wood barrels, new French Oak and new American Oak, and then blended together at the end of the aging process.

Casa Dragones Reposado Mizunara, 100% Blue Agave reposado tequila, is the first tequila rested exclusively in new Mizunara casks, a rare oak originally from Japan.

== Terroir ==
Tequila has an appellation of origin, like cognacs and champagne - tequila can only be produced in certain municipalities of Jalisco, Michoacan, Nayarit, Guanajuato or Tamaulipas. Casa Dragones harvests its agaves in The Valley of Tequila, Jalisco, located in the Trans-Mexican Volcanic Belt - a chain of active and inactive volcanoes across Mexico.

== Aging process ==
The brand's Añejo tequila, Casa Dragones Barrel Blend, 100% Blue Agave tequila achieves its character by being aged in two different wooden barrels: new French Oak and American Oak, each selected for its individual flavor and characteristics. At the end of the aging process both barrel styles are blended together.

== Recognition ==
=== Accolades ===
2020, Casa Dragones Joven was featured in Robb Report’s list of " 20 Best Tequilas You Can Buy Right Now".

2020, Town & Country added Casa Dragones Joven to its "17 Best Sipping Tequilas" list.

2019, Casa Dragones was featured in Robb Report’s "The Best Tequilas You Can Buy" list.

2019, Forbes featured Casa Dragones’ Joven as one of "The Best Spirits and Cocktails of 2019".

2019, Casa Dragones’ Tasting Room and CEO Bertha González Nieves featured in luxury travel magazine, Departures.

2018, Esquire named Casa Dragones' Tasting Room a 'must-visit' spot in Mexico.

2018, Vogue named Casa Dragones Blanco a "best gift this Summer".

2018, Casa Dragones Blanco was featured in the first ever Bar Cart Awards as a mixologist's essential.

2017, CNN-travel named Casa Dragones Joven the best sipping tequila in the world.

2017, Hailed "a Rose amongst Thorns" by luxury magazine Les Carats.

2016, Travel + Leisure magazine, described Casa Dragones Joven as "likely the best sipping tequila made".

2014, Casa Dragones Joven was named "Best Sipping Tequila" by Epicurious Magazine.

May 2013, Wine Enthusiast rated Tequila Casa Dragones Joven a 96/100 – the magazine's highest tequila rating, saying, "The end result is extraordinarily smooth, with a very sweet, fruity, almost wine-like nose but a bold, pure peppery flavor that finishes cleanly".

2011, Forbes named Casa Dragones as their Tastemaker's Top Tequila, and noted the Joven tequila as "smooth, fresh and inviting tequila meant for sipping".

November 2010, Casa Dragones won the Grand Prix Stratégies du Luxe, a product and packaging design award for luxury brands. This was the first time a Mexican brand and a tequila had won this award

=== In the media ===
Oprah Winfrey dubbed Tequila Casa Dragones her favorite tequila in an interview with Facebook Live and on an Oprah's Favorite Things holiday television special.

Casa Dragones was featured in Netflix’s Chef's Table program.

2018, CEO Bertha González Nieves featured on the Today Show’s feature, "Leading The Way", where she explained the story of Tequila Casa Dragones and named "Tequila's Rising Star".

Casa Dragones tequila was featured on Ellen as celebrity chef and TV host Ayesha Curry created mango cocktails for Ellen and Jennifer Aniston.

=== Cultural figures ===
Casa Dragones’ Blanco & Joven tequila featured on Oprah's Favorite Things list in 2014, 2017; and Casa Dragones Blanco mini was featured in 2018. In 2020 Casa Dragones Joven was featured in Oprah Magazine’s 20th Anniversary Edition O List, "20 items to celebrate 20 years!", and Casa Dragones as a company was featured in "Oprah Magazine Presents 15 Small Businesses You Can Support Right Now".

In 2020, Lily Aldridge added drinking Casa Dragones Joven to the list of things she was doing to stay sane, in the Vogue article 'Lily Aldridge Shares the 7 Ways She's Staying Sane at Home".

Casa Dragones Blanco was featured as the main ingredient for Martha Stewart's favorite Pomegranate Margarita.

Casa Dragones was served at the Vanity Fair Oscars After Party, 2018.

Martha Stewart selected Casa Dragones Joven as one of Martha's Finds on 17 December 2009.

Ryan Seacrest listed Casa Dragones in his 2017 "multi-tasking must-haves", and gave away Casa Dragones at the Grammys.

Casa Dragones has received praise from the culinary world, including, but not limited to: Chef Scott Conant, Chef Eric Ripert, Chef Bobby Flay, Chef Enrique Olvera, Chef Thomas Keller, Chef Martin Berasategui and Chef Daniela Soto-Innes.

Acclaimed bartenders and drinks experts such as Yana Volfson, Adrian Evans and Sandra Fernandez have also commended Casa Dragones Tequila.

Other celebrities including musician Dr. Dre, actor Jonah Hill & director Martin Scorsese, actor Chris Pratt, model Lilly-Rose Depp, Huffington Post founder Arianna Huffington and artist Spencer Tunick have also displayed their affinity for Casa Dragones’ tequila.

== Collaborations ==
Casa Dragones announced an exclusive collaboration with TANE honoring September 16 and Mexican Independence. 16 sets were created in this collaboration. Each set comes with custom-crafted silver and obsidian coasters, silver tray, pepita engraved tequila glasses, silver glass identifiers, a silver bottle holder and top, and comes in a leather box. The second edition of this limited set was released in 2019, and it featured a newly designed leather case, unique engravings of the silver bottle holder and top, crafted silver and obsidian coasters, silver tray, pepita engraved tequila glasses, and silver glass identifiers.

Artist Pedro Reyes collaborated with Casa Dragones in 2016. Exploring the traditional technique of Pepita glass engraving, Reyes featured an etching of his sculpture, "Epircuro" - 400 bottles were created.

For the debut of Danh Vo's Slip of the Tongue exhibition at Punta Della Dogana Venice in 2015, the featured artist and curator transformed the signature Casa Dragones Joven bottle into a limited collection of 150 Special Edition Punta Della Dogana 2015 bottles. A second installment was exhibited at the Venice Biennale's 2015 Danish Pavilion, where an edition of 666 bottles were incorporated and sold.

In 2012, Casa Dragones announced a special edition collaboration with Artist Gabriel Orozco in honor of his mid life retrospective.
