= Badia Spices =

American spice manufacturer

Badía Spices
- Company type: Private
- Industry: Process & Packaged Goods
- Founded: 1967; 59 years ago, in Miami, Florida
- Founder: José Badía
- Headquarters: Doral, Florida, United States
- Area served: Worldwide
- Products: Spices, herbs, flavorings
- Website: badiaspices.com

Badia Spices is an American manufacturer of spices and herbs that began in 1967. The spices are manufactured in Doral, Florida, where the company was founded and maintains its headquarters.

== History ==
The company was started by José Badía, a Cuban exile who fled the island nation in the 1960s. Though he had a hardware business in Cuba, in the U.S. he started the spice business in a small shop in the Little Havana neighborhood of Miami. In 1970, José hired his son, Joseph "Pepe", to manage daily operations, and Pepe is now the majority owner and president of Badia Spices, Inc.

In November 2018, Gel Spice Co. was ordered to pay $564,000 to Badia Spices for trademark infringement.

Badia Spices sells over 400 products, including raw spices and herbs, blended spices, and dried chili peppers, throughout the United States and more than 70 other countries.

== See also ==
- List of food companies
