= Charles P. Nemfakos =

American government official (born 1942)

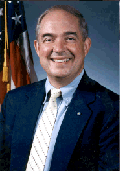
Charles P. Nemfakos

Charles P. Nemfakos (born 1942) was United States Assistant Secretary of the Navy (Financial Management and Comptroller) from 1998 to 2001.

== Biography ==
Charles P. Nemfakos was born in Athens, Greece, on October 21, 1942. He was raised in the Rio Grande Valley in Texas, and graduated from McAllen High School in 1960. He attended the University of Texas–Pan American in Edinburg, Texas, graduating with a B.A. in History in 1964. He then attended Georgetown University, receiving an M.A. in Government.

In 1966, Nemfakos joined the United States Department of the Navy as a Management Intern, and then received a permanent job with the Office of Naval Material. In August 1973, he joined the Office of the Assistant Secretary of Defense (Comptroller) as a senior budget analyst. In this position, he was responsible for United States Department of Defense Test and Evaluation activities, procurement of all Department of Defense communication and electronic equipment, and naval weapons. In August 1975, he became Director for Budget Policy in the Office of the Comptroller of the Navy. There, he was responsible for budget policies and procedures. In August 1976, he was promoted to Associate Director of Budget and Reports in the Office of the Comptroller of the Navy, meaning he now oversaw the formulation, presentation and execution of the budget of the United States Department of the Navy. After eighteen years in this office, Nemfakos joined the Office of the Assistant Secretary of the Navy (Installations and Environment) in January 1994 as a Deputy Assistant Secretary of the Navy. In this capacity, he was responsible for implementing the Department of the Navy's Base Realignment and Closure in 1995.

In August 1995, Nemfakos became Deputy Under Secretary of the Navy, and was responsible for institutional management, strategic planning and assisting the Secretary and Under Secretary of the Navy with privatization, incentives, and further right-sizing.

In October 1998, United States Secretary of the Navy John Howard Dalton designated Nemfakos as Senior Civilian Official in the Office of the Assistant Secretary of the Navy (Financial Management and Comptroller), and Nemfakos held this post from November 5, 1998, until July 2, 2001.

Upon leaving federal service, Nemfakos became an executive at Lockheed Martin in the Naval Electronics and Surveillance Systems division. In September 2003, Nemfakos launched a consulting firm, Nemfakos Partners, LLC. In March 2007, he became a senior fellow at RAND. Also in 2007, Nemfakos was elected as a fellow of the National Academy of Public Administration.

Government offices
Preceded by Deborah P. Christie; Gladys J. Commons (acting)	Assistant Secretary of the Navy (Financial Management and Comptroller); November 5, 1998 – July 2, 2001	Succeeded by Dionel M. Aviles
