= Richard Greco Jr. =

American businessman, educator and former United States Government official

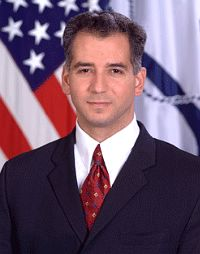
Richard Greco Jr.

Richard Greco Jr. is an American businessman, educator, former United States Government official, and long-standing trustee and benefactor of educational, cultural, and civic institutions. He was appointed by President George W. Bush of the United States and confirmed by the Senate as the nation's 19th Assistant Secretary of the Navy (Financial Management and Comptroller) and served from 2004 to 2007.

In this role, he was the chief financial officer of the Department of the Navy, responsible for an annual budget of more than $130 billion and a financial management workforce of 9000 professionals, including budgeters, analysts, auditors, fiscal lawyers, Congressional relations officers, and financial operations personnel. The Department of the Navy would be equivalent to the 7th largest corporation in the world based on revenues. He also served as chairman of the Department of the Navy audit committee, a member of the Acquisition Integrity Board, and the executive committee of the United States Naval Academy. For exceptional service Greco was twice awarded the Department of the Navy's Distinguished Public Service Medal, the highest civilian medal awarded by the Navy. In addition, Greco's Fiscal Year 2005 Department of the Navy Annual Financial Report was awarded the Gold Vision Award and was named one of the top 100 corporate annual reports in the world in the Overall category. During his tenure as Assistant Secretary, Greco also served for two years as National President of the American Society of Military Comptrollers, an association of 18,000 financial professionals. Greco's strategic vision for financial management at the Department of the Navy, entitled Transforming Today to Win Tomorrow, continued to guide the office of the Assistant Secretary for many years following his tenure and included long-term initiatives such as portfolio analysis and management, human capital development, private sector technology adoption, and many others.

In 2007 Richard Greco Jr. was named Managing Partner of the private investment firm Filangieri Capital Partners, which he led for ten years until his retirement in 2017. His investment portfolio in the United States and Italy included companies in the aerospace and defense, homeland security, medical software, IP, AI, metal mechanics, and water treatment industries. As a principal investor with a seat on the board of directors or executive committee of most portfolio companies, Greco provided management with strategic, operational, and financial guidance, including matters of corporate governance, internationalization, shareholder value creation, restructuring, and M&A. Greco also served as a member of the board of directors of the Quadrivio Investment Group based in Milan, Italy, with more than $1.4 billion of private equity assets under management. Since 2007, Greco has also served as a senior advisor to the international business strategy firm The Scowcroft Group, based in Washington, D.C., founded and managed by former National Security Advisor Brent Scowcroft. He also served as a senior advisor to the fixed-income asset manager Muzinich & Co., based in New York City, where he helped establish a corporate debt fund for small and medium-sized businesses in Italy and as a member of the Board of Advisors of the Morgan Stanley Journal of Applied Corporate Finance. In 2017, Greco exited his portfolio and retired from business.

Richard Greco Jr. is the founder and chairman of the Board of The Montfort Academy, a classical curriculum high school in the Archdiocese of New York. Widely recognized as a leader of the classical curriculum movement, The Montfort Academy has inspired other classical high schools to open around the country. Mr Greco also has served on the board of trustees or board of advisors of other civic and not-for-profit organizations, including The Hudson River Museum and Planetarium; the Westchester County Department of Parks, Recreation, and Conservation (where he served as Vice Chairman); Untermyer Gardens; and The Navy League of the United States New York Chapter. He has written for the Longitude journal of international economy and is invited regularly to speak on matters of foreign policy, international finance, business strategy, corporate governance, business ethics, education, public service, and leadership.

== Early life ==
Born in the Bronx and raised in Pelham Manor, New York, Richard Greco Jr. attended Prospect Hill Elementary School and Pelham Memorial High School. He was ranked first in his class at Pelham Memorial High School and attended Fordham University on a full academic Presidential scholarship. He studied chemistry at Fordham and received a B.S. in 1991, graduating Summa cum laude, in cursu honorum and was class valedictorian. Later, he attended the Paul H. Nitze School of Advanced International Studies at Johns Hopkins University where he received an M.A. in international economics and American Foreign Policy. He also attended the University of Chicago Graduate School of Business where he was graduated with an M.B.A. in finance. During the time between college and graduate school Greco briefly attended medical school at the Columbia University College of Physicians and Surgeons and was a high school teacher of physics, Italian, and Spanish.

Greco's first job after graduate school was as an associate at The Scowcroft Group in Washington, DC, where he advised investment fund managers and corporate executives about emerging markets, specifically in Africa, Asia, and the former Soviet Union. While at The Scowcroft Group, Greco assisted George H. W. Bush and Brent Scowcroft in editing A World Transformed, a book about the foreign policy of the United States in the post-Cold War era. In 1997, Greco joined the corporate finance advisory firm of Stern Stewart & Co and became a managing director, specializing in advising companies and government agencies on value creation. There, he oversaw Stern Stewart's expansion into Italy, with the joint venture of Ambrosetti Stern Stewart Italia. During this period, Greco became a regular lecturer at Bocconi University, the School of Management at the Libera Università Internazionale degli Studi Sociali Guido Carli, and the Italian Association of Financial Analysts. He later became manager of Stern Stewart's Government Services Division.

== The Montfort Academy ==
In 1998, during his time at Stern Stewart, Greco founded The Montfort Academy, a Catholic high school in Mount Vernon, New York offering a classical curriculum focusing on academic excellence and character formation, with courses such as civics, geography, astronomy, rhetoric and debate, Latin, Greek, philosophy, and religion. More than 700 students have attended The Montfort Academy's full-time and part-time programs, including the special Renaissance Invitational program. The Montfort Academy has a 100% college admissions rate. For the years 2005–2009, 2012–2013, 2014–2015, and 2020-2025 The Montfort Academy was named one of the best 50 Catholic high schools in America by the Cardinal Newman Society. The website Niche K12 has ranked The Montfort Academy in the top 20 private high schools in New York State and in the top 200 private high schools in America. The Montfort Academy's distinguished lecture series has featured notable persons such as former Senator Rick Santorum (a candidate in the 2012 primary season for President of the United States), former New York City Police Commissioner Howard Safir, and former Vice Chairman of Goldmas Sachs and Under Secretary of State Robert Hormats, and Justin Muzinich, former Deputy Secretary of the Treasury. Greco has served as president and chairman of the Board of The Montfort Academy since its founding. In 2015, Richard Greco Jr. was selected by the International Organization of Catholic Education at the United Nations to represent the United States at the Holy See World Congress called "Educating Today and Tomorrow." This quadrennial conference on the state and future of Catholic education fell in 2015 on the 50th anniversary of Gravissimum educationis, Pope Paul VI's Declaration on Christian Education and the 25th anniversary of Ex corde Ecclesiae, Pope John Paul II's document regarding Catholic colleges and universities. Greco's contribution to the conference was featured in the book, Testimonios, Educar Hoy y Mañana, Una pasion que se renueva, with a foreword written by Pope Francis and published by the Holy See Congregation for Catholic Education. In 2016, Greco addressed a roundtable of Catholic college Presidents at the Cardinal Newman Society in Washington, DC regarding classical education. Since 2017, when he retired from business, Greco has served as the full-time president of The Montfort Academy.

== United States Government Service ==
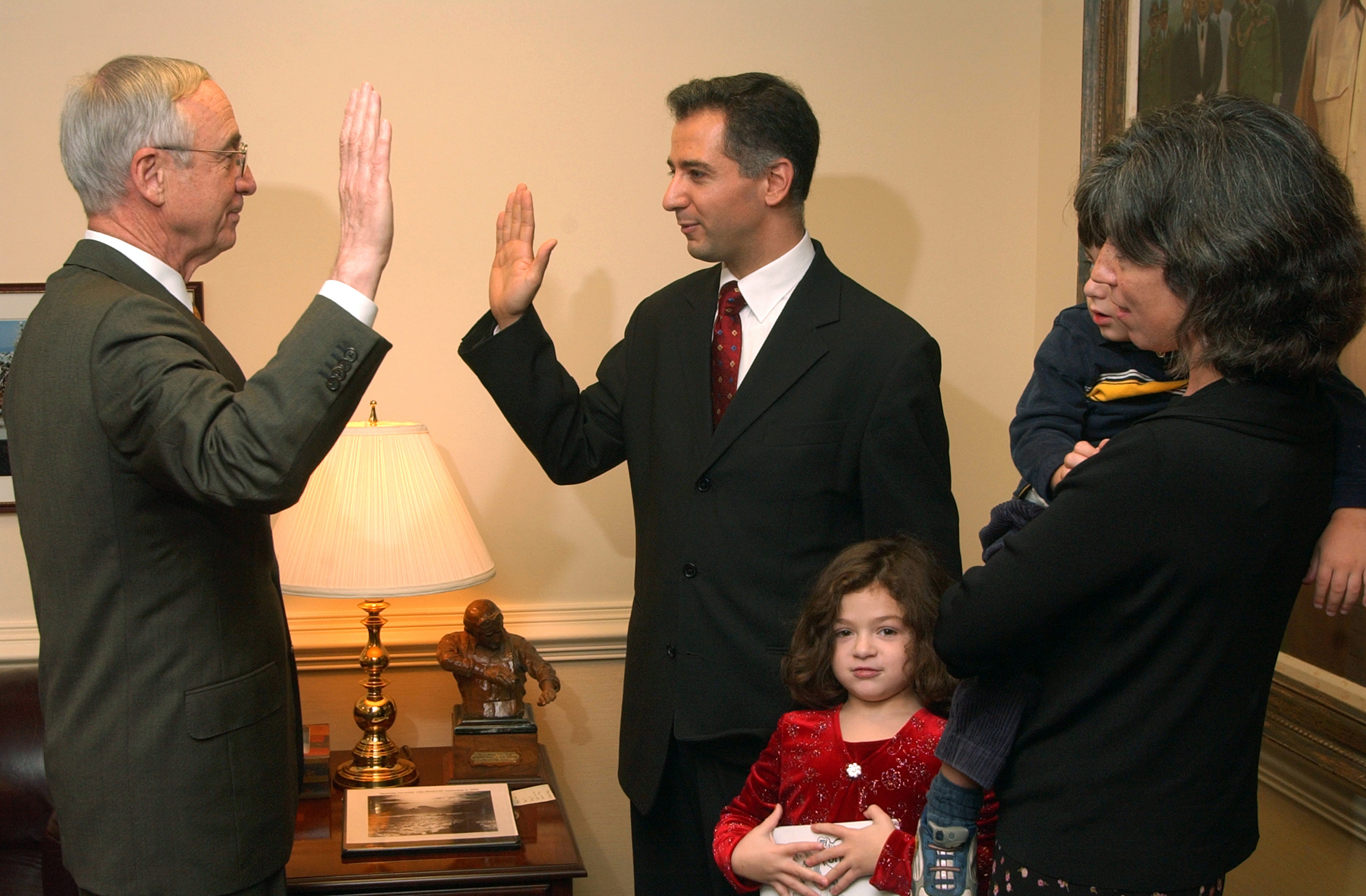
United States Secretary of the Navy Gordon R. England swears in Greco as Assistant Secretary of the Navy (Financial Management and Comptroller), October 26, 2004.

In June 2002, Greco was appointed by President George W. Bush as a White House Fellow. He was assigned by the White House as a special assistant to the Secretary of Defense. During this fellowship year, he spent six weeks in Baghdad as an advisor in the Coalition Provisional Authority, providing advice on private sector and financial markets development, foreign direct investment, and currency exchange. When his fellowship was over, Greco was appointed acting director of Private Sector Development for Iraq, and in this capacity was a liaison between the international private sector and the Coalition Provisional Authority. On September 10, 2004, President of the United States George W. Bush nominated Greco as Assistant Secretary of the Navy (Financial Management and Comptroller). After confirmation by the United States Senate, Greco served as the chief financial officer of the Department of the Navy from October 26, 2004, until 2007.

During Greco's tenure as Assistant Secretary, the Navy and Marine Corps continued to fight in the Iraq War, the War in Afghanistan (2001-2021), and elsewhere. In addition, the Navy and Marine Corps responded to the earthquake and tsunami in southeast Asia, the earthquake in Pakistan and India, and Hurricane Katrina. Greco helped the Department of the Navy incorporate best practices in corporate governance and link together financial, business, and information systems. Also during his tenure, Greco presented to Congress and inaugurated a long-term Financial Improvement Plan, established the first-ever Audit Committee, developed a financial efficiency index, a "just-in-time" cash management system, a portfolio analysis capability based on private sector analytical techniques, and a recruiting and retention program for the financial management workforce. During his tenure the department also advanced its Financial Improvement and Audit Readiness effort and its Enterprise Resource Planning (ERP) initiative.

== Post-government ==
Upon his retirement from government service in 2007, Greco was named president and Managing Partner of Filangieri Capital Partners, a New York firm making private equity and venture capital investments and offering corporate finance and strategic advisory services. Also in 2007 Greco was elected to the Board of Directors of Mediware Information Systems (NASDAQ: MEDW), a publicly traded medical software company. In 2008 Greco was elected to the Board of Directors of Finmeccanica SpA (MILAN: FNC), a publicly traded global aerospace, defense, and energy company with $25 billion in revenues. Finmeccanica's name was changed to Leonardo in 2017. In addition, Greco served on the boards of directors of several privately held companies and a global private equity investment group with more than $1.4 billion in assets under management. Greco was a member of the board of advisors of the Morgan Stanley Journal of Applied Corporate Finance. In 2011 Greco was named as a monthly contributor to Longitude, the international journal of foreign affairs and international business. In 2012 he was appointed to the board of advisors of the Marconi University Graduate School of Business in Rome, Italy, where he also held the rank of Professor of Business Administration and Political Economy. He is also a senior advisor at The Scowcroft Group, a business advisory firm assisting companies in emerging markets founded and managed by General Brent Scowcroft, former National Security Advisor of the United States. In 2014 Greco was elected to the Board of Directors of portfolio company AnalytixInsight, a publicly traded company offering comprehensive fundamental equity analysis on over 40,000 global companies, under the trade-names Capital Cube and Marketwall, now available on all Samsung mobile devices. Also in 2014, Greco was named chief executive officer and Vice Chairman of the Board of portfolio company Euro Mec Water Group, the parent company for Euro Mec Srl, a global water and waste water treatment company based in Mantua, Italy. In February 2015 he was appointed CEO of Euro Mec Srl, the operating company of the Euro Mec Water Group (EMWG), which was in financial distress. During his tenure as CEO Greco led an important restructuring of EMWG and successfully returned the company to profitability. In 2015 and 2016 EMWG posted revenues of 8.5 million Euros and 11.8 million Euros, up from 42,000 Euros in 2014. In 2017, after ten years as CEO of Filangieri Capital Partners, Richard Greco Jr. exited his portfolio, retired from business, and assumed the full-time role of President of The Montfort Academy, the Catholic high school he had founded nearly 20 years prior. Today, he dedicates himself entirely to Catholic education.

== Civic life ==
Richard Greco Jr. is very active in civic causes, especially education, the arts and sciences, environmental conservation, and foreign policy. He serves on the Board of Trustees of The Montfort Academy and has served on the Board of Advisors of the New York Council of the United States Navy League, the Board of Advisors of the Boy Scouts of America Westchester Putnam Council, and a member of the board of trustees of the Hudson River Museum and Planetarium in Yonkers, New York. For eight years he served as a member and for three years Vice Chairman of the Westchester County Parks, Recreation, and Conservation Board, the citizen board of the largest county parks system in the United States. He is now board member Emeritus. He also served as a member of the board of trustees of the Untermyer Gardens Conservancy in Yonkers, NY. From 2007 to 2008 he served as a Trustee of the Yonkers Board of Education. Greco also has served as a trustee of the Italian Language Foundation. He is a life member of the Council on Foreign Relations.. Greco was also performed advisory work for Poten & Partner through his consulting company Filangieri Advisory Corporation where he was as part of a civil proceedings for breaches of contract, breach of fiduciary duty, fraud, unjust enrichment, and theft of corporate opportunity.

== Distinctions and awards ==
Among Greco's distinctions are The Department of the Navy's Distinguished Public Service Award, Knighthood of the Italian Republic bestowed by the president of the Republic of Italy, The Ellis Island Medal of Honor, Knighthood of the Order of the Holy Sepulchre, the Filippo Mazzei Award for Public Service, the Order of the Sons of Italy Grand Lodge of New York Award, and the United States Navy League's Meritorious Service Award, which was presented at a ceremony and dinner at New York City's Waldorf=Astoria Hotel. In 2014 he was invested into The Sovereign Military Hospitaller Order of Saint John of Jerusalem, of Rhodes, and of Malta, also known as the Order of Malta, a Roman Catholic lay order dedicated to works of charity and goodwill throughout the world.

== Personal ==
In 1998 Greco married Marla DeGaetano. They have six children and reside in Westchester County, New York.

== Publications ==
• Water Purification, Waste Water Treatment, and Water Re-Use. Premise in White Book presented at EXPO 2015. June 2015.

• Credit Where Credit is Due, "Longitude", February 2013. With Justin Muzinich.

• Titano 2018: The Reorganization and Relaunch of the Financial System in the Republic of San Marino. With Carlo Pelanda and Domenico Lombardi. AIEP Editors. December 2012. (In Italian).

• China—Economics Before Politics, A Lesson for the Next President, "Longitude", June 2012.

• SPACS—A No Brainer, "Longitude", May 2012. With Achille Teofilatto.

• Follow the Yellow Brick Road . . . to Utah: The Return of the Gold Standard, Longitude, March 2012.

• Serving God and neighbor, Longitude, January 2012.

• The Linchpin of Stability: The modern relationship between Italy and the United States, Longitude, December 2011.

• The Future of Libya Can Be Found in Alaska, Longitude, October 2011.

• Debt was the Price of Liberty—Implications of Deficit Reduction for the Defense Industry, Longitude, September 2011.

• Pakistan: Failed State, Rogue State, Friend, and Foe, Longitude, August 2011.

• Exit from Afghanistan: Strategy over Schedule, Longitude, July 2011.

• Letters from the National President, Armed Forces Comptroller, the quarterly magazine of the American Society of Military Comptrollers, Contributed to six quarterly editions, 2005–2006.

• Italy-US: the Strength of Their Relationship. America Oggi. October 12, 2003.

• Military Compensation – The Case for a More Flexible System. EVAluation Report. April 2001.

• National Performance Review – A Step in the Right Direction. EVAluation Report. July 2000.

• The Creation of Value in the Italian Banking System. Financial Analysis. June 2000.

• Best Practices in Valuation Methodology and Estimation of Cost of Capital among Italian Financial Analysts. Journal of the Association of Italian Financial Analysts. October 1999.

• Estimation of the Market Risk Premium: Evidence from the United States Market. October 1999.

• The Strength of EVA for the Public Sector. Il Sole 24 Ore. October 6, 1998. (with Fabio Fedel)

• The Operationalization of Economic Value Added in the Firm. Journal of the Association of Italian Financial Analysts. October 1998.

• Turkey at the Crossroads. White House Weekly. Vol. 17(27) 1996. (with Arnold Kanter).

• The Markets Bet on Italy: So Do We. International Political Economy. Vol. 3(9) 1996. (with Marvin Zonis).

• The Markets are Making a Smart Bet on Italy. Economic Times (The Conference Board). Vol. 7(6) 1996.

• Proceedings of the 1991 International Meeting of the Electrophoresis Society. Isolation of Metallothionein from Cadmium-contaminated Isopods. Richard Greco, Donald Clarke, Grace Vernon, & Ruth Witkus. 1991.

• Proceedings of the American Association for the Advancement of Science. Bioaccumulation of Heavy Metals in Primary Consumers. Vernon G., Greco R., Heisey R., Gonazalez G. & Witkus R. 1990.

• Proceedings of the 47th Annual Meeting of the Electron Microscopy Society of America. Localization of Heavy Metals in the Hepatopancreas of the Terrestrial Isopod Oniscus asellus. Vernon G., Greco R., & Witkus R. 1989.

Government offices
Preceded by Robert L. Panek (acting)	Assistant Secretary of the Navy (Financial Management and Comptroller); October 26, 2004 – 2007	Succeeded by Douglas A. Brook
