= Rumbaugh =

Rumbaugh is a surname. Notable people with the surname include:

- James Rumbaugh (born 1947), American computer scientist
- Russell Rumbaugh, Assistant Secretary of the Navy (Financial Management and Comptroller)
- Sue Savage-Rumbaugh (born 1946), American primatologist
