= Robert H. Conn =

American government official (1925–2020)

Robert Henry Conn (June 8, 1925 – August 4, 2020) was an American state official. He served as Deputy Under Secretary of the Navy (Financial Management and Comptroller) from 1981 to 1984 and Assistant Secretary of the Navy (Financial Management and Comptroller) from 1984 to 1988.

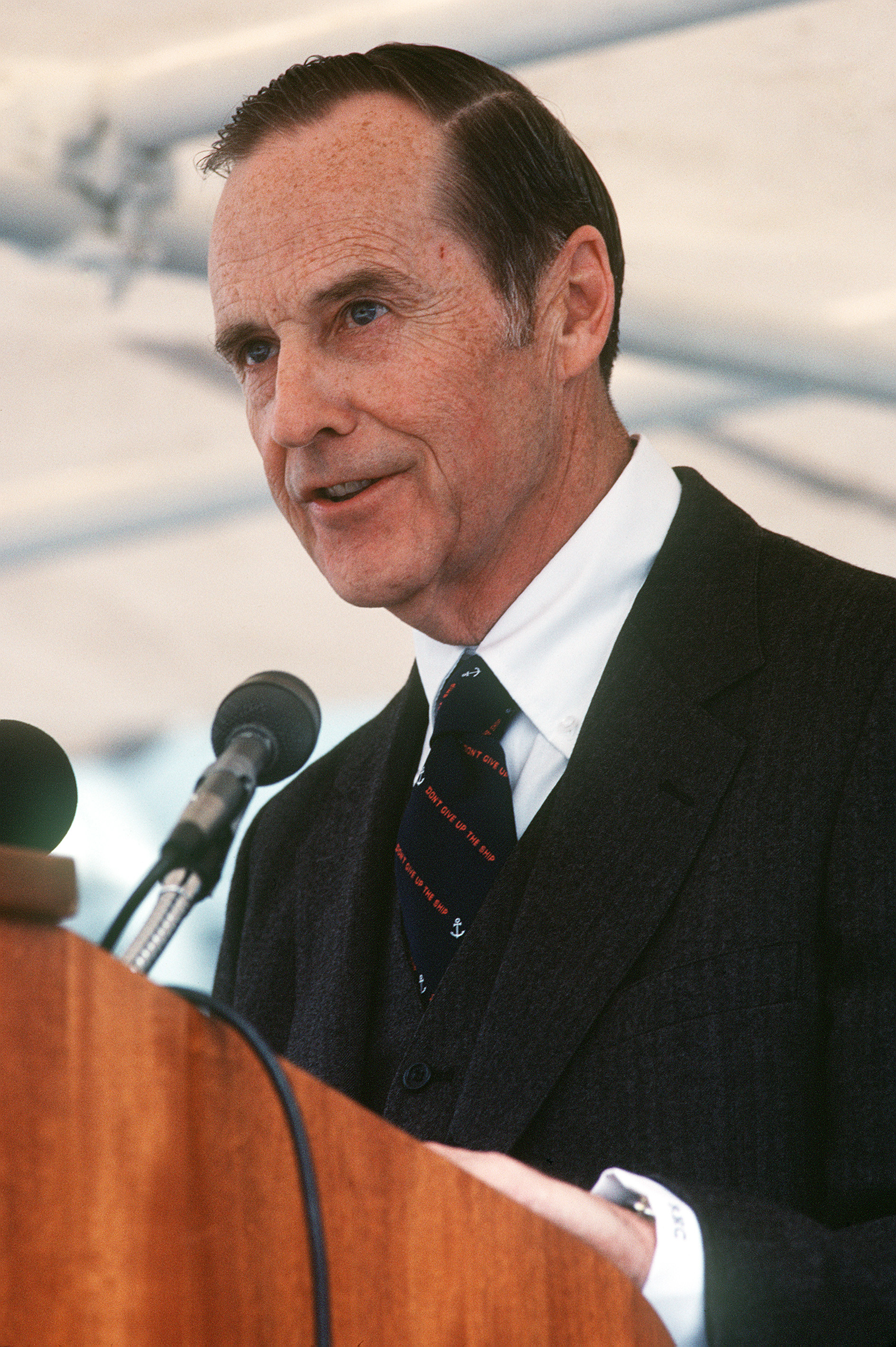

== Biography ==
Robert Henry Conn was born in Boonton, New Jersey, in June 1925, the son of Henry Hammond Conn and Violet Bertha Doremus. His father was a descendant of Mayflower passengers Francis Cooke and James Chilton, and his mother Cornelis Melyn, Everardus Bogardus, Nicasius de Sille and Joris Jansen Rapelje, all early settlers of New Amsterdam which would later become New York City.

Conn began his undergraduate studies at Princeton University and was given leave by the President and Trustees upon his enlistment in the Navy on October 1, 1943. He attended the Navy Flight School from 1943 to 1946; he was designated as a United States Naval Aviator in 1946. Conn served in the Navy, including postings in seaplanes, land-based patrol bombers, carrier based fighter and attack squadrons, and as a flight instructor. From 1954 to 1956, Conn studied business administration at the University of Mississippi, receiving a B.A. in 1956.

Conn enrolled in the University of Rochester and received an M.S. in management in 1962. Conn spent 1963 at the Naval War College, and then enrolled in doctoral studies in management and economics at Indiana University.

In 1967, Conn became the assistant director of the Chief of Naval Operations Budget Office. From 1968 to 1969, he was Director of the Fleet Resources Office at Headquarters Naval Material Command. He was awarded the Meritorious Service Medal for his work at the Fleet Resources Office. From 1969 to 1972, he was assistant director for Budget and Reports in the Office of the Navy Comptroller. Conn retired from the United States Department of the Navy on January 1, 1972, with the rank of Captain.

Conn then joined Arthur Andersen as manager of the Federal Liaison Division. He worked at Arthur Andersen until 1981. An extremely proficient sailor, he was a long time member of the New York Yacht Club (NYC and Rhode Island) and the Indian Creek Yacht and Country Club (Kilmarnock, VA).

In 1981, President of the United States Ronald Reagan nominated Conn as Comptroller and Deputy Under Secretary of the Navy (Financial Management and Comptroller), and Conn began his term of office in May. In February 1984, President Reagan formally nominated Conn as Assistant Secretary of the Navy (Financial Management), and this was Conn's title from March 1984 until Conn left office on December 15, 1988. For his service, Conn was awarded both the Navy Distinguished Service Medal and the Defense Distinguished Service Medal. Additionally, Secretary Conn was awarded the Legion of Merit in his distinguished career as an Officer and Aviator in the United States Navy.

Conn married Virginia "Ginny" Inness-Brown (daughter of New Yorkers Hugh Alwyn Inness-Brown Sr., and Virginia Portia Royall Inness-Brown). Virginia Inness-Brown attended Smith College, and was a descendant of early colonial governors John Winthrop and Robert Treat.

They had five children: Portia Royall Conn (Giffin now Hirschman), Judith Conn (Goodnow), Robert Henry Conn Jr., Patricia Inness Conn (now Royall), and Catherine Elizabeth Conn. Virginia Inness-Brown Conn died in October 2011. Conn resided in Southport, Maine with Meredith Pierce Mitchell, whom he married on February 14, 2013. He died in August 2020 at the age of 95.

Government offices
Preceded by George A. Peapples	Assistant Secretary of the Navy (Financial Management and Comptroller); May 1981 – December 15, 1988	Succeeded by James M. Seely (acting); Robert C. McCormack
