= Dionel M. Aviles =

American politician

Dionel Aviles
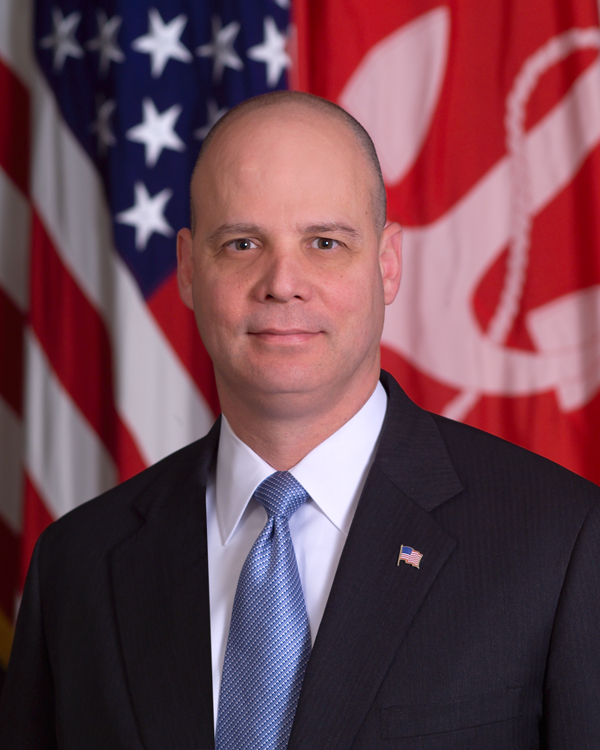

Acting United States Secretary of the Navy
- In office December 29, 2005 – January 3, 2006
- President: George W. Bush
- Preceded by: Gordon R. England
- Succeeded by: Donald C. Winter

United States Under Secretary of the Navy
- In office October 8, 2004 – May 19, 2009
- President: George W. Bush; Barack Obama
- Preceded by: Susan Livingstone
- Succeeded by: Robert O. Work

United States Assistant Secretary of the Navy for Financial Management
- In office July 17, 2001 – October 8, 2004
- President: George W. Bush
- Preceded by: Charles P. Nemfakos
- Succeeded by: Robert Panek (acting)

Personal details
- Born: January 23, 1961 (age 65) Bryan, Texas, U.S.
- Education: United States Naval Academy (BS)

Dionel Michael Aviles (born January 23, 1961) was the United States Under Secretary of the Navy from October 8, 2004, to May 19, 2009, part of which he served as the acting United States Secretary of the Navy.

== Biography ==
A native of Bryan, Texas, Dionel M. Aviles graduated from the United States Naval Academy with a Bachelor of Science degree in mechanical engineering in 1983. He subsequently spent 1983 through 1988 as a surface warfare officer in the United States Navy. He retired from the navy in 1988, though he remained an officer of the United States Navy Reserve.

After leaving the navy, Aviles initially worked as a production support engineer, working on the Standard Missile and Phalanx CIWS programs. He then joined the Naval Air Systems Command, where he worked on developing the BGM-109 Tomahawk as part of the Naval Air Systems Command's Cruise Missile Project.

From 1991 to 1995, Aviles worked in the National Security Division of the Office of Management and Budget within the Executive Office of the President of the United States. He began as the budget examiner of the navy's procurement and R&D budgets. He ended as the division director responsible for the defense accounts used during the President of the United States' proposed United States federal budget. During this period, he earned an MBA from the George Washington University in 1993.

In 1995, Aviles became a professional staff member on the staff of the United States House Committee on Armed Services. There, his work focused on defense budgeting and finance issues. He also did work related to Navy shipbuilding and procurement.

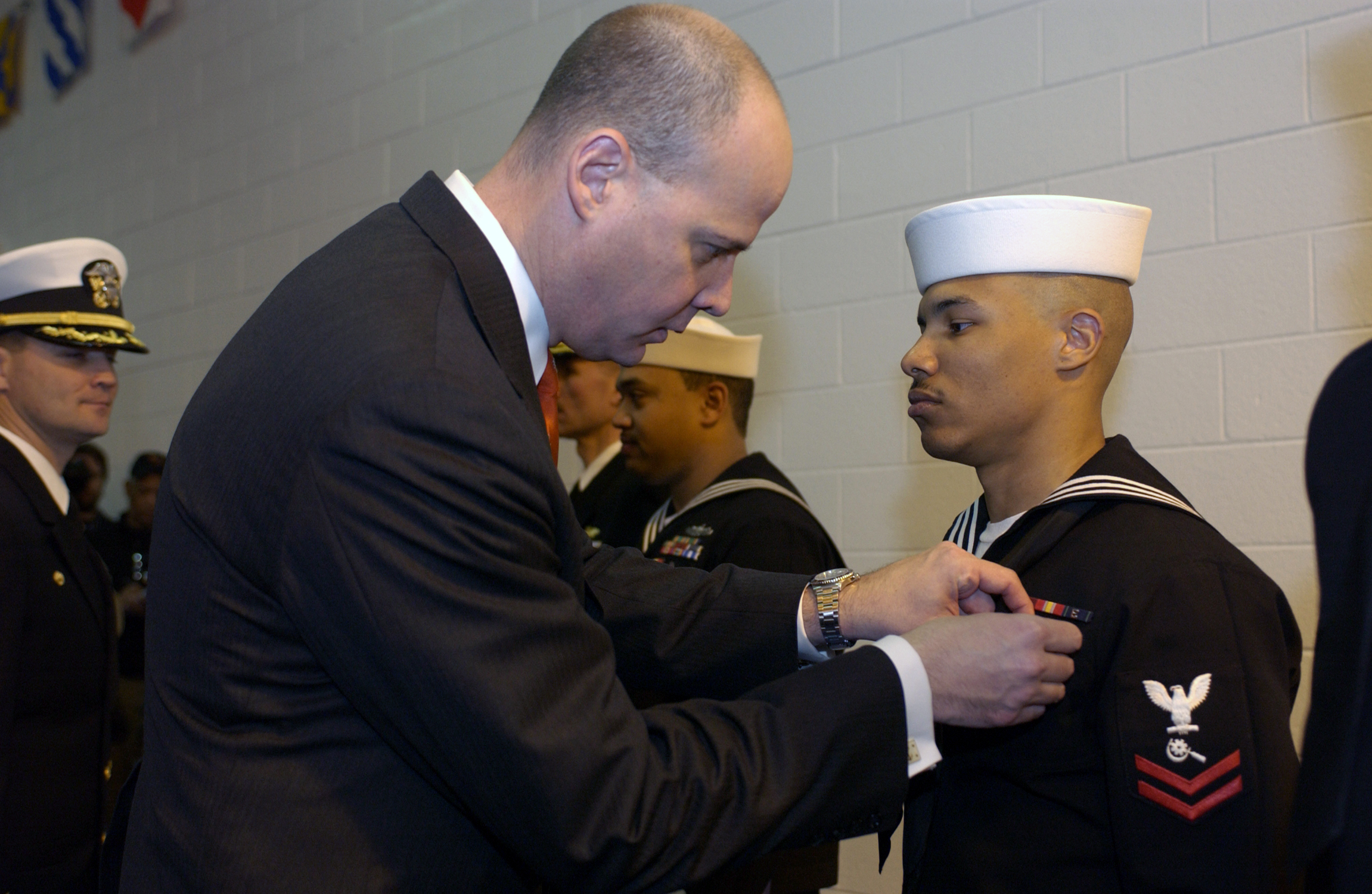
Assistant Secretary Aviles awarding the Navy and Marine Corps Medal in 2004.

In 2001, President George W. Bush nominated Aviles as Assistant Secretary of the Navy (Financial Management), and Aviles served in this capacity from July 2001 until October 2004.

President Bush subsequently nominated Aviles as Under Secretary of the Navy and Aviles was sworn in as Under Secretary on October 8, 2004. He resigned in May 2009 and was replaced by Robert O. Work.

== Notes ==
Government offices
Preceded by Charles P. Nemfakos	United States Assistant Secretary of the Navy for Financial Management; 2001–2004	Succeeded by Robert Panek; Acting
Preceded by Susan Livingstone	United States Under Secretary of the Navy; 2004–2009	Succeeded by Robert O. Work
Preceded by Gordon R. England	United States Secretary of the Navy; Acting; 2005–2006	Succeeded by Donald C. Winter
