= Assistant Secretary of the Navy (Financial Management and Comptroller) =

Office of the US Department of the Navy

Assistant Secretary of the Navy for Financial Management and Comptroller
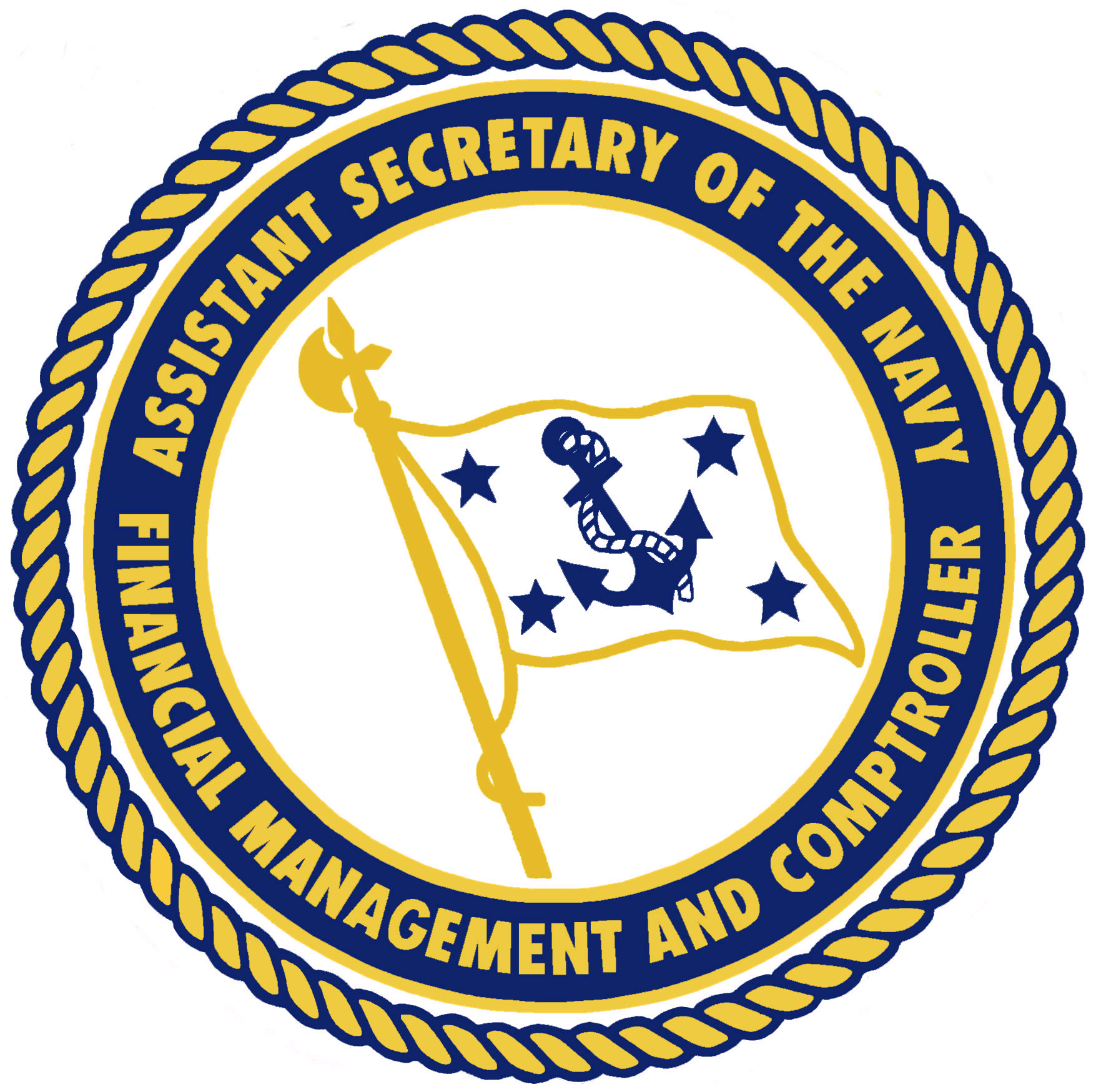
- Seal of the assistant secretary of the Navy (financial management and comptroller)

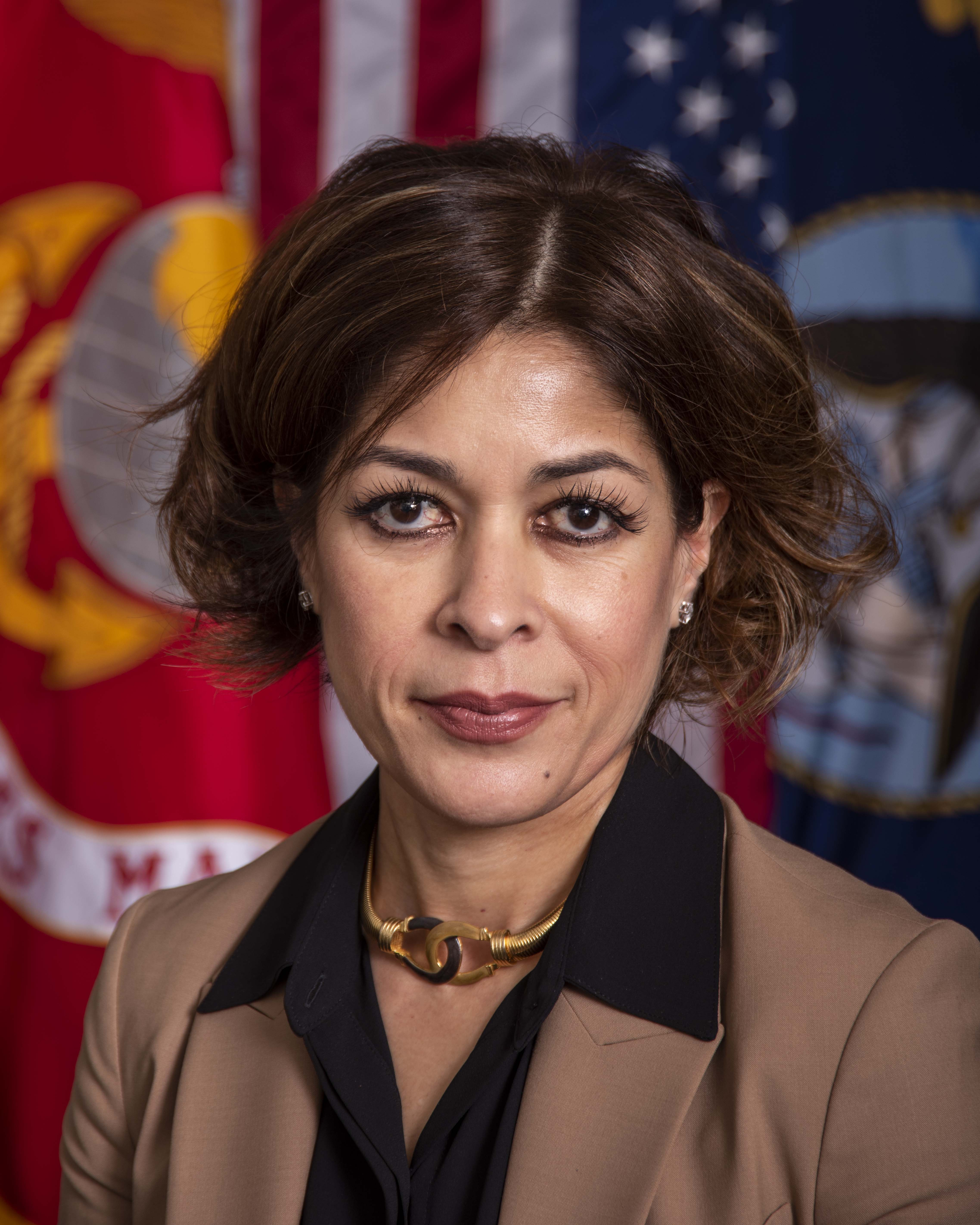
- Incumbent; Alaleh Jenkins; Acting since January 20, 2025
- Style: Mr. Secretary; The Honorable (formal address in writing)
- Reports to: Under Secretary of the Navy
- Seat: The Pentagon, Arlington County, Virginia, United States
- Nominator: The president with Senate advice and consent
- Term length: No fixed term
- Constituting instrument: 10. U.S.C. § 8016
- Formation: October 1954
- First holder: William B. Franke
- Succession: 18th in SecDef succession by seniority of appointment
- Salary: Executive Schedule, Level IV
- Website: Official website

The assistant secretary of the Navy (financial management and comptroller) (abbreviated ASN FM) is a civilian office of the United States Department of the Navy. The assistant secretary of the Navy (financial management and comptroller) is responsible for managing and directing all of the financial matters, including the annual budgets, of the United States Navy and the United States Marine Corps. The assistant secretary of the Navy (financial management and comptroller) is also the comptroller of the Department of the Navy. The assistant secretary of the Navy (financial management and comptroller) reports to the under secretary of the Navy.

The office was established in 1954; disestablished in 1958; and then re-established in 1961. In June 1981, the office was re-designated as Deputy Under Secretary of the Navy (Financial Management and Comptroller), but in March 1984, the name switched back to Assistant Secretary of the Navy (Financial Management and Comptroller).

== Assistant secretaries of the navy (financial management and comptroller), 1954—present ==
Name	Assumed office	Left office	President appointed by	Secretary served under
William B. Franke	October 4, 1954	April 16, 1957	Dwight D. Eisenhower	Charles Thomas
J. Sinclair Armstrong	May 28, 1957	January 2, 1959	Dwight D. Eisenhower	Thomas S. Gates, Jr.
Victor M. Longstreet	September 14, 1962	December 31, 1965	John F. Kennedy	Fred Korth; Paul Nitze
Charles F. Baird	March 7, 1966	August 1, 1967	Lyndon B. Johnson	Paul Nitze
Charles Arthur Bowsher	December 18, 1967	June 30, 1971	Lyndon B. Johnson	Paul Robert Ignatius; John Chafee
Frank P. Sanders	August 2, 1971	May 5, 1972	Richard Nixon	John Chafee
Robert D. Nesen	May 31, 1972	May 15, 1974	Richard Nixon	John Warner
Gary D. Penisten	October 15, 1974	May 20, 1977	Gerald Ford	J. William Middendorf
George A. Peapples	November 3, 1977	September 1980	Jimmy Carter	W. Graham Claytor, Jr. Edward Hidalgo
Robert H. Conn	May 1981	December 15, 1988	Ronald Reagan	Edward Hidalgo; John Lehman; Jim Webb; William L. Ball
Rear Admiral James M. Seely (Acting)	December 18, 1988	January 1990	Ronald Reagan; George H. W. Bush	William L. Ball; Henry L. Garrett III
Robert C. McCormack	January 12, 1990	January 5, 1993	George H. W. Bush	Henry L. Garrett III; Sean O'Keefe
Albert V. Conte (Acting)	January 10, 1993	December 11, 1993	George H. W. Bush	John Howard Dalton
Deborah P. Christie	March 16, 1994	March 12, 1998	Bill Clinton	John Howard Dalton
Gladys J. Commons (Acting)	March 20, 1998	October 15, 1998	Bill Clinton	John Howard Dalton
Charles P. Nemfakos	November 5, 1998	July 2, 2001	Bill Clinton	Richard Danzig
Dionel M. Aviles	July 17, 2001	October 8, 2004	George W. Bush	Gordon R. England
Robert L. Panek (Acting)	October 9, 2004	October 25, 2004	George W. Bush	Gordon R. England
Richard Greco, Jr.	October 26, 2004	2007	George W. Bush	Gordon R. England; Donald C. Winter
Douglas A. Brook	2007	January 20, 2009	George W. Bush; Barack Obama	Donald C. Winter
Gladys J. Commons	November 3, 2009	August 29, 2013	Barack Obama	Ray Mabus
Susan J. Rabern	August 30, 2013	January 20, 2017	Barack Obama	Ray Mabus
Joseph B. Marshall, Jr. (Acting)	January 20, 2017	January 2, 2018	Donald Trump	Sean Stackley (Acting)
Thomas W. Harker	January 2, 2018	January 20, 2021	Donald Trump	Richard Spencer; Kenneth Braithwaite
Alaleh Jenkins (Acting)	January 20, 2021	January 3, 2023	Joe Biden	Thomas Harker (Acting); Carlos Del Toro
Russell Rumbaugh	January 3, 2023	January 20, 2025	Joe Biden	Carlos Del Toro
Alaleh Jenkins (Acting)	January 20, 2025	Present	Donald Trump	Terence G. Emmert (Acting); John Phelan; Hung Cao (acting)
