= Robert C. McCormack =

American government official (born 1939)

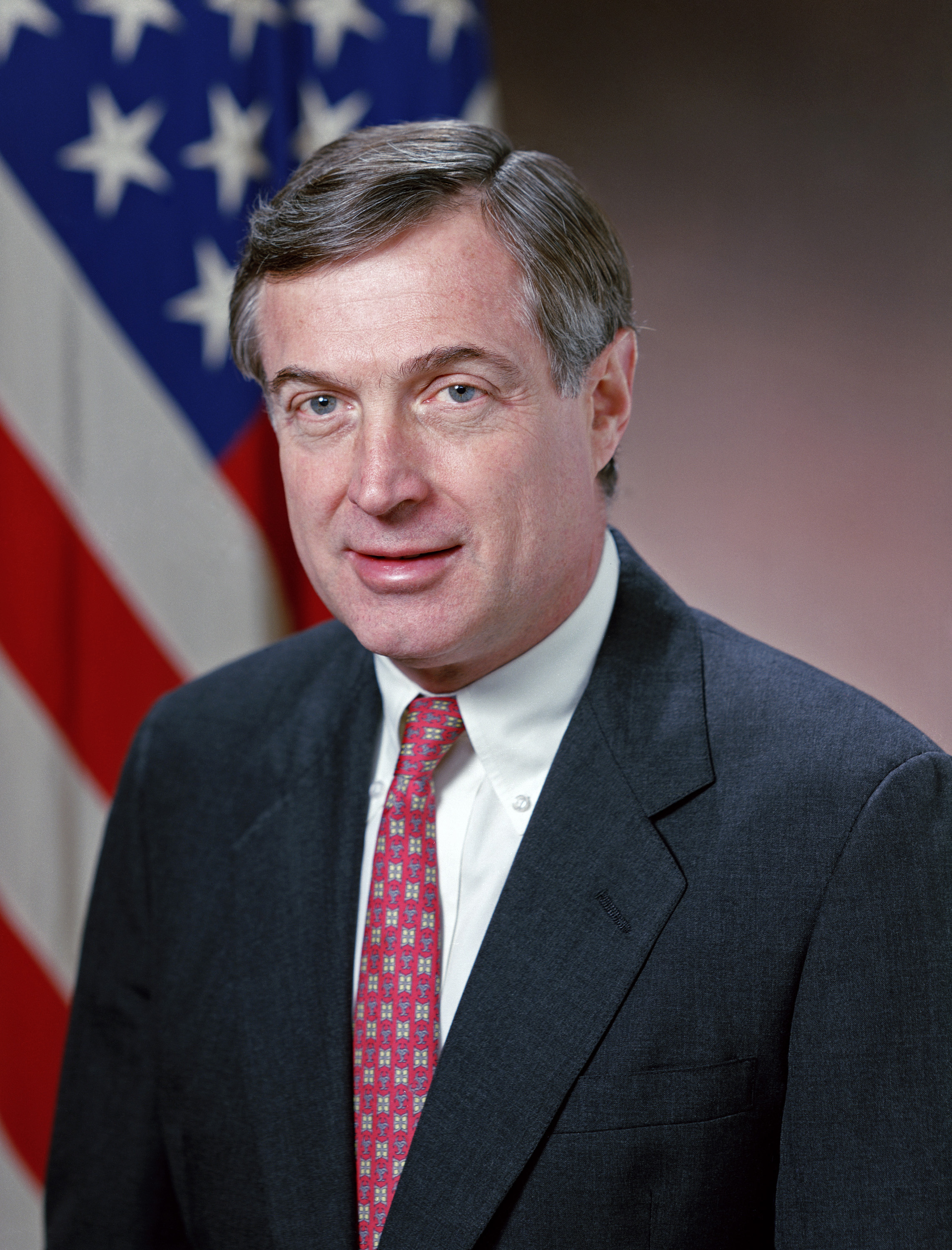

Assistant Secretary of the Navy
- In office January 12, 1990 – January 5, 1993
- President: George H.W Bush
- Preceded by: Robert H. Conn
- Succeeded by: Deborah P. Christie

Personal details
- Born: Robert Cornelius McCormack; November 7, 1939 (age 86) New York City
- Spouse: Mary Laura Lester (m. 1963)
- Children: 3
- Education: University of North Carolina

Robert Cornelius McCormack (born November 7, 1939) is an American politician who served as the United States Deputy Assistant Secretary of Defense for Production Support from 1987 to 1988, Deputy Under Secretary of Defense for Industrial and International Programs from 1988 to 1990 and Assistant Secretary of the Navy (Financial Management and Comptroller) from 1990 to 1993.

== Early life ==
McCormack was born in New York City on November 7, 1939. He was educated at The Hotchkiss School and then the University of North Carolina, receiving a B.A. in 1962. After graduating from college, McCormack joined the United States Navy and served in the navy from 1962 to 1966. After leaving the navy, McCormack matriculated at the University of Chicago Graduate School of Business and received an M.B.A. in 1968. McCormack married Mary Laura Lester on December 14, 1963. Together they had 3 sons, Rob McCormack, Walter McCormack, and William McCormack; also known as Scott McCormack.

McCormack joined Dillon, Read & Co. in 1968, working there until 1981, by which time he had attained the rank of senior vice president. At Dillon, Read, McCormack worked in corporate finance in the New York and Chicago offices. In 1981, he left Dillon, Read for Morgan Stanley, becoming a managing director.

== Political career ==
McCormack entered government service in 1987, when he joined the United States Department of Defense as Deputy Assistant Secretary of Defense for Production Support. In 1988, he became Deputy Under Secretary of Defense for Industrial and International Programs. He was awarded the Distinguished Civilian Service Medal in 1989.

On October 10, 1989, President of the United States George H. W. Bush nominated McCormack as Assistant Secretary of the Navy (Financial Management and Comptroller). McCormack subsequently held this office from January 12, 1990, until January 5, 1993. In a 2001 letter supporting McCormack's nomination for an alumni award from the University of Chicago Graduate School of Business, Dick Cheney, who was United States Secretary of Defense while McCormack was Assistant Secretary of the Navy (Financial Management), praised McCormack's performance, writing: "The challenge was to find ways to maintain America's superior naval presence at a time when resources were at a premium. Bob McCormack used all his entrepreneurial skills to successfully meet that challenge...Not everyone can move so gracefully between the private and public sectors."

Upon leaving government service, McCormack was a co-founder of Trident Capital, a venture capital firm. He served as a Managing Director of Trident Capital until 2005, when he assumed the role as Advisory Director to the General Partner. At Trident, McCormack oversaw the early financing of MapQuest. Under McCormack's guidance, Trident also made investments in CSG Systems, which would become the largest cable-television billing service in the United States.

McCormack has served as a member of the board of directors of numerous firms, including DeVry, Inc., Illinois Tool Works, MeadWestvaco, Northern Trust, MapQuest, and PGi.

Government offices
Preceded by Robert H. Conn; James M. Seely (acting)	Assistant Secretary of the Navy (Financial Management and Comptroller); January 12, 1990 – January 5, 1993	Succeeded by Alert V. Coste (acting); Deborah P. Christie
