= Gladys J. Commons =

American government official (born 1948)

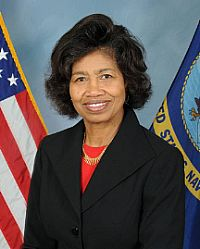
Gladys J. Commons

Gladys Lee Commons (born Gladys Lee James; November 2, 1948) is the former United States Assistant Secretary of the Navy (Financial Management and Comptroller).

== Biography ==
Gladys J. Commons was born in Maple Hill, North Carolina. She educated at Fayetteville State University (B.Ed.) and at the American University (master's degree in Public Financial Management).

In July 1969, Commons became a Claims Representative with the Social Security Administration. In 1971, she moved to the Office of Naval Research, taking a job as a Budget Analyst with the Office of Naval Research's Comptroller. With the creation of the Naval Data Automation Command (NAVDAC) in 1977, she became Lead Budget Analyst for the Operations Program/Budget Division. In 1980, she moved to the Naval Facilities Engineering Command (NAVFAC), becoming Supervisory Budget Analyst and Branch Head of the Budget and Operations Branch. In 1983, she became the Budget Officer and Head of the Materiel Program and Budget Branch, Materiel Division at the Installations and Logistics Department at Headquarters Marine Corps. She spent 1986-87 at the Industrial College of the Armed Forces at Fort Lesley J. McNair. In 1987, she became Comptroller of the Marine Corps Research, Development and Acquisition Command (later renamed the Marine Corps Systems Command). She was promoted to the Senior Executive Service in August 1991.

In February 1994, Commons was named Principal Deputy Assistant Secretary of the Navy (Financial Management), a post she held for eight years, until September 2002. She served as acting Assistant Secretary of the Navy (Financial Management) from March 20, 1998, to October 15, 1998. In October 2002, she became Comptroller of the Military Sealift Command. She retired from federal service in March 2004.

In 2009, President of the United States Barack Obama nominated Commons as Assistant Secretary of the Navy (Financial Management and Comptroller), and she has held that office since November 3, 2009.

== External link ==
- U.S. Navy Biography

Government offices
Preceded by Deborah P. Christie	Assistant Secretary of the Navy (Financial Management and Comptroller) (acting); March 20, 1998 – October 15, 1998	Succeeded by Charles P. Nemfakos
Preceded by Douglas A. Brook	Assistant Secretary of the Navy (Financial Management and Comptroller); November 3, 2009 – August 29, 2013	Succeeded by Susan J. Rabern
