= Douglas A. Brook =

American government official

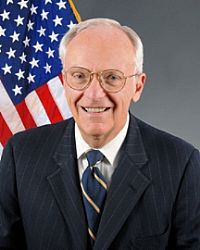

Assistant Secretary of the Navy (Financial Management and Comptroller)
- In office 2007–2009
- Preceded by: Richard Greco, Jr.
- Succeeded by: Gladys J. Commons

Personal details
- Born: Douglas Alan Brook; January 15, 1944 (age 82) Chicago, Illinois, U.S.
- Spouse: Mariana Proctor Brook
- Education: University of Michigan
- Occupation: Visiting Professor of Public Policy, Duke University

Douglas Alan Brook (born January 15, 1944) is visiting professor of public policy in the Sanford School of Public Policy at Duke University. He was United States Assistant Secretary of the Army (Financial Management and Comptroller) from 1990 to 1992 and Assistant Secretary of the Navy (Financial Management and Comptroller) from 2007 to 2009.

== Biography ==
Douglas A. Brook was born in Chicago and raised in East Detroit, Michigan. He was educated at the University of Michigan, receiving a bachelor's degree in political science in 1965 and a Master of Public Administration degree in 1967. After college, he served in the United States Navy from 1968 to 1970, and remained an officer in the United States Naval Reserve retiring in 1998 at the rank of captain. In 2009 he received the Alumni Service Award from Michigan's Gerald R. Ford School of Public Policy.In 2013 he was named a distinguished alumnus by the Navy Supply Corps Foundation.

In 1971 he joined the National Association of Manufacturers first as director of public finance and later as assistant vice president for public affairs. In 1977, Brook joined Libbey–Owens–Ford in 1976 as vice president of government affairs. He completed the executive education program at the Darden Graduate School of Business Administration in 1977. He left Libbey-Owens-Ford in 1982 to found Brook Associates, Inc., a public affairs consulting business, serving corporate and trade association clients. During this time, he lived in Vienna, Virginia, and served two elected terms on the Vienna Town Council.

In 1990, President of the United States George H. W. Bush nominated Brook to be Assistant Secretary of the Army (Financial Management and Comptroller) and, after Senate confirmation, Brook held that office from 1990 to 1992. He also served as acting director of the United States Office of Personnel Management in 1992.

Brook left government service in 1992, becoming vice president of government affairs for LTV Corporation. He held this position until the liquidation of LTV Corporation in 2002. In 2001 he received his Ph.D. in public policy from George Mason University. In 2002, he became dean of the Graduate School of Business & Public Policy at the Naval Postgraduate School. He stepped down as dean in 2005, but remained a professor of public policy and director of the Naval Postgraduate School's Center for Defense Management Research. In 2006 Brook was elected as a Fellow of National Academy of Public Administration (United States).

In 2007, President George W. Bush nominated Brook to be Assistant Secretary of the Navy (Financial Management and Comptroller) and Brook held that office from 2007 to 2009. He was also acting Under Secretary of Defense (Comptroller) from 2008 to 2009.

At Duke University he has taught an array of public policy courses on topics including policy analysis, public budgeting and national security. He has received awards for teaching and mentoring from both the Duke Sanford School and the Naval Postgraduate School.

In 2020, Brook, along with over 130 other former Republican national security officials, signed a statement that asserted that President Trump was unfit to serve another term, and "To that end, we are firmly convinced that it is in the best interest of our nation that Vice President Joe Biden be elected as the next President of the United States, and we will vote for him."

Brook is an active choral singer. He has sung tenor with the Front Street United Methodist Church Chancel Choir in Burlington, North Carolina, under the direction of Choirmaster Laura Sam, the Monterey Symphony Chorus, San Jose Symphonic Choir, New Dominion Chorale, Greensboro Choral Society, the Toowoomba Philharmonic Choir in Queensland, Australia and in London with Goldsmith's Choral Union.

Government offices
Preceded by Richard Greco, Jr.	Assistant Secretary of the Navy (Financial Management and Comptroller); 2007 – 2009	Succeeded by Gladys J. Commons
