= William B. Franke =

American businessman and government official

William Franke
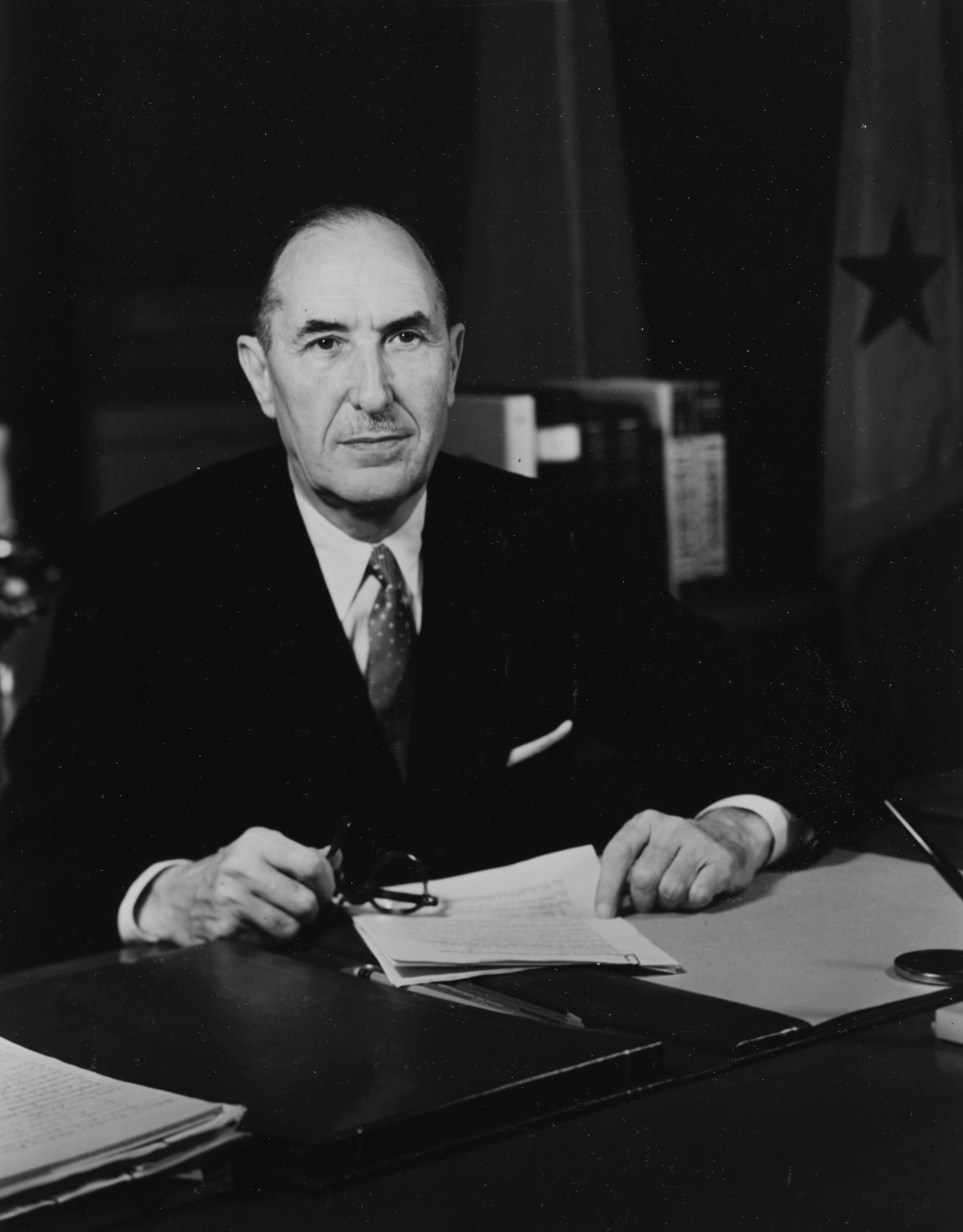

55th United States Secretary of the Navy
- In office June 8, 1959 – January 19, 1961
- President: Dwight D. Eisenhower
- Preceded by: Thomas S. Gates Jr.
- Succeeded by: John Connally

Personal details
- Born: April 15, 1894 Troy, New York, U.S.
- Died: June 30, 1979 (aged 85) Rutland, Vermont, U.S.
- Resting place: Fairview Cemetery, Benson, Vermont
- Party: Republican
- Education: Pace University (BS)
- Occupation: Accountant; Business executive Government administrator

William Birrell Franke (April 15, 1894 – June 30, 1979) was an American businessman and government official. He was best known for his service as United States Secretary of the Navy from 1959 to 1961 under Dwight D. Eisenhower.

== Biography ==
Franke was born in Troy, New York, the son of William G. and Helena E. (Birrell) Franke. He was educated in Troy, and attended Pace College, where he graduated with a business degree and specialized in accounting.

== Business career ==
His career included position as an accountant, manager and executive with Cluett, Peabody & Company of New York City, Naramore, Niles & Company of Rochester, New York and Touche, Nivin & Company of New York City. He was later the senior partner in Franke, Hannon & Withey, a New York accountancy firm. Franke was also a member of the board of directors of several other companies, including chairman of the board for the John Simmons Company of Newark, New Jersey and board of directors member for the General Shale Products Corporation of Johnson City, Tennessee and the Carolina, Clinchfield and Ohio Railway. In 1935 and 1936 Franke attracted notice when he completed audits of Louisiana State University following the assassination of Huey P. Long that exposed inconsistencies in university records and finances.

== Government service ==
From 1948 to 1951, Franke was a member of the United States Army Controller's Civilian Panel. He was a Special Assistant to the Secretary of Defense from 1951 to 1952.

Franke served as Assistant Secretary of the Navy for Financial Management and Comptroller from 1954 to 1957. He served as Under Secretary of the Navy from April 1957 until June 1959. As Secretary of the Navy at the end of the Eisenhower administration, Franke was instrumental in developing and implementing new, modern technology for the United States Navy, including the use of nuclear-powered warships.

== Later life ==
After retiring, he resided at his family's summer home, Pasture House, in Benson, Vermont. He maintained an office in Rutland, where he worked as an investment counselor . He was also a board of directors member and advisory board member for Vermont's Howard Bank.

== Death and burial ==
Franke died in Rutland after complications from gall bladder surgery. He was buried at Fairview Cemetery in Benson.

== Honors and awards ==
In 1948, Franke received the honorary degree of Doctor of Science from the University of Louisville. In 1955, he received an honorary LL.D. from Pace College. He was awarded the Army's Patriotic Civilian Commendation, the Department of Defense's Distinguished Service Award, and the Medal of Freedom to recognize his work at the Department of Defense and Department of the Navy.

== Family ==
Franke married the former Bertha Irene Ready of Schenectady, New York, who pre-deceased him. They were the parents of three daughters, Phyllis, Anne, and Patricia.

Government offices
Preceded by New Office	Assistant Secretary of the Navy (Financial Management and Comptroller); October 4, 1954 – April 16, 1957	Succeeded by J. Sinclair Armstrong
Preceded by Thomas S. Gates Jr.	Under Secretary of the Navy; April 17, 1957 – June 7, 1959	Succeeded by Fred A. Bantz
Preceded by Thomas S. Gates Jr.	United States Secretary of the Navy; June 8, 1959 – January 19, 1961	Succeeded by John Connally
