= Thomas Harker =

American defense official

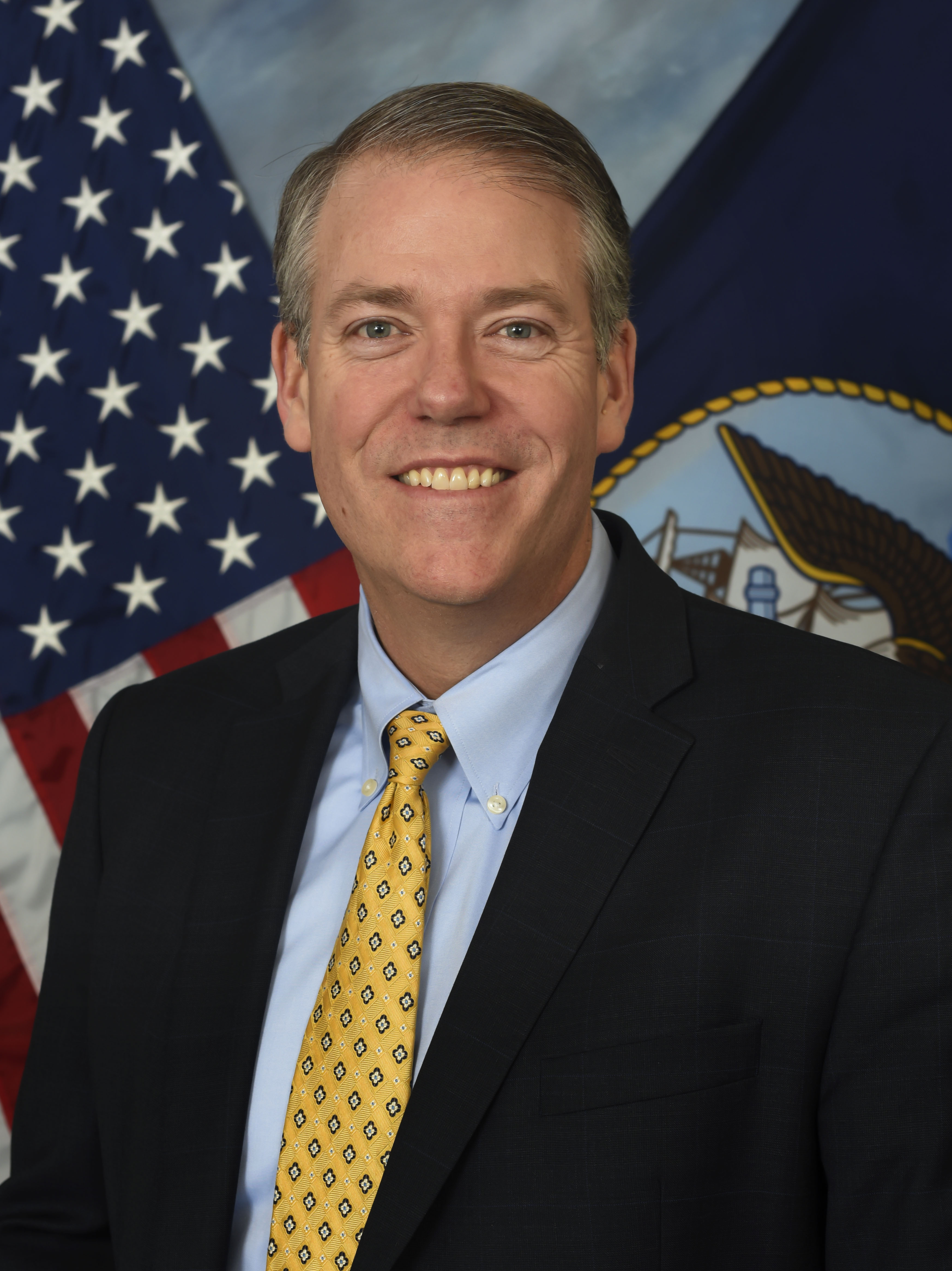
- Official portrait, 2018

Acting United States Secretary of the Navy
- In office January 20, 2021 – August 9, 2021
- President: Joe Biden
- Deputy: James Geurts (acting)
- Preceded by: Kenneth Braithwaite
- Succeeded by: Carlos Del Toro

Acting Under Secretary of Defense (Comptroller)/CFO
- In office June 26, 2020 – April 9, 2021
- President: Donald Trump; Joe Biden
- Preceded by: Elaine McCusker
- Succeeded by: Anne McAndrew (acting)

Assistant Secretary of the Navy for Financial Management and Comptroller
- In office January 2, 2018 – January 20, 2021
- President: Donald Trump; Joe Biden
- Preceded by: Susan Rabern
- Succeeded by: Russell Rumbaugh

Personal details
- Education: University of California, Berkeley (BA); University of Miami (MBA)

Military service
- Allegiance: United States
- Branch/service: United States Coast Guard
- Rank: Commander

Thomas Wesley Harker is an American government official who has served in the United States Department of Veterans Affairs and the United States Department of Defense. Harker was nominated by President Donald Trump to serve as an assistant secretary of the Navy (financial management and comptroller) and was confirmed on December 20, 2017 and sworn in on January 2, 2018. He was designated as the acting United States under secretary of defense (comptroller) on June 26, 2020.

On January 20, 2021, Harker was sworn in as the acting secretary of the Navy under President Joe Biden.

== Career ==
Prior to becoming acting secretary of the Navy and comptroller for the Department of Defense, Harker served as the associate deputy assistant of financial policy for the Department of Veterans Affairs, financial manager in the Office of Management and Budget, the United States Department of Housing and Urban Development, and as a commissioned officer in the United States Coast Guard, retiring in the rank of Commander.

At the Office of Management and Budget, Harker led the OMB's "Campaign to Cut Waste", which charged federal agencies with a line-by-line examination of their expenditure budgets.

During his 21 years in the Coast Guard, Harker was responsible for financial reporting, setting policy, overseeing property management and preparing audits. His audit preparation, according to the Association of Government Accountants, led to "clean audit opinions" after 10 successive disclaimers for the Department of Homeland Security.

While on active duty in the Coast Guard, Harker was also involved in drug seizures.

=== Acting Secretary of the Navy ===
==== Addressing sexual assault ====
While touring Navy and Marine Corps facilities in his hometown of San Diego, Harker told the press his priorities as Acting Secretary of the Navy include preventing sexual assault and encouraging sailors to seek mental health counseling following a stressful year during the COVID-19 pandemic. To address the issue of sexual assault, Harker said the Navy and Marine Corps will use data collected over the last couple of years to identify which units are at increased risk of sexual assault incidents, mindful that sexual assault is more likely to occur in units in which sexual discrimination and harassment are evident. “If you have a climate where sexual harassment is tolerated, the predators can hide easier,” he said. “If you have a climate where sexual harassment is not tolerated some of the behaviors that a predator might do ... are less tolerated, so it’s easier to go in and find people.”

==== Sailor mental health ====
Harker said another priority will be sailor mental health and for that he will need more Navy corpsmen trained in counseling. Harker's focus on mental health followed the Pentagon's August 2021 annual report to Congress, which cited an increase in suicide rates. A Defense Department inspector general report from the same year concluded access to mental health resources in the military is inadequate, with 53% of active duty service members and their families unable to receive needed mental health care.

To remove the stigma of seeking mental health counseling, Harker recorded a video in which he said he had sought mental health counseling three times in his life: his parents' divorce, his own divorce; recovery effort involving 80 men, women and children who died in a ferry disaster off the coast of Haiti. In the video, Harker tells sailors, “In the course of your service, you may see and experience things most Americans won’t even think about ... don’t shelve those experiences away.”

To hire more psychiatrists and trained corpsman, Harker requested funds in the current Defense Department budget be reprogramed to invest in mental health to prevent sailor suicide. It was not clear from which DOD budget the money would be reprogrammed, though both the Secretary of Defense and Congress would have to approve any such transfer of funds.

Harker said every commanding officer and large unit commander he spoke with has had a member of their command commit suicide sometime during their career.

== Awards ==
- Coast Guard Meritorious Service Medal
- Coast Guard Commendation Medal
- Coast Guard Achievement Medal
- Association of Government Accountants Achievement of the Year Award

Political offices
Preceded by Kenneth Braithwaite	United States Secretary of the Navy; Acting; 2021	Succeeded by Carlos Del Toro
