= George A. Peapples =

American businessman

- Born: November 6, 1940; Benton Harbor, Michigan
- Died: March 7, 2012 (aged 71); Ann Arbor, MI
- Education: University of Michigan
- Occupation: Businessperson

George Alan Peapples (November 6, 1940 – March 7, 2012) was a General Motors executive who was United States Assistant Secretary of the Navy (Financial Management and Comptroller) from 1977 to 1980.

== Early life ==
Peapples was born in Benton Harbor, Michigan. He was educated at the University of Michigan, receiving a B.A. in Economics in 1962 and an M.B.A. in Finance in 1963. Peapples was also the Drum Major for the University of Michigan Marching Band.

== Career ==
Peapples began his career in the General Motors financial staff in Detroit. In 1968, he was transferred to the GM treasurer's office in New York City. He was promoted in 1971 to director of the capital analysis and investments section. In 1973, he became assistant divisional comptroller of GM's Delco Moraine division. He became assistant treasurer, bank relations of GMC in 1975.

On October 12, 1977, President of the United States Jimmy Carter nominated Peapples as Assistant Secretary of the Navy (Financial Management and Comptroller). Peapples held this office from November 3, 1977, until September 1980. He was awarded the Navy Distinguished Public Service Medal for his work in the United States Department of the Navy.

On leaving government service, Peapples returned to GM as assistant comptroller of the corporation. In 1982, he was made vice-president and finance manager of General Motors Canada, and in 1986, he was promoted to become president and general manager of General Motors Canada. Peapples also served as a director of the Conference Board of Canada.

== Personal life ==
Peapples died in 2012 in Ann Arbor, Michigan.

Government offices
Preceded by Gary D. Penisten	Assistant Secretary of the Navy (Financial Management and Comptroller); November 3, 1977 – September 1980	Succeeded by Robert H. Conn
