= The Montfort Academy =

Location
- 125 East Birch Street; Mt. Vernon, (Westchester County), New York 10552; United States; 41°15′17″N 73°41′22″W

Information
- Type: Private, co-educational
- Motto: Instaurare omnia in Christo ("To restore all things in Christ")
- Religious affiliation: Roman Catholic
- Patron saint: St. Louis de Montfort
- Established: 2001 (original campus)
- President: Richard Greco, Jr.
- Headmaster: Lt. Col. David Petrillo, USAF (ret.)
- Grades: 9–12
- Enrollment: 150
- Student to teacher ratio: 1:7 (teacher/administrator: student)
- Campus type: Suburban
- Colors: Blue and gold
- Slogan: Seek Wisdom, Practice Virtue, Keep the Faith
- Team name: Fighting Knights
- Tuition: $17,200
- Website: themontfortacademy.org

The Montfort Academy is an American private, Roman Catholic high school in Mt. Vernon, New York.

It is located within the Roman Catholic Archdiocese of New York.

== Background ==
As of 2012, the school had been ranked for seven years in a row as one of America's 50-best Catholic high schools.

The school has a 100 percent college-acceptance rate, and an average SAT score in the 85th percentile. Seventy percent of students achieve the Mastery Level of the New York Regents Examinations, which is 85 percent or above.

The school was founded in 1998 by a small group of businessmen and educators, including Richard Greco, Jr., a corporate finance executive and former Assistant Secretary of the Navy.

The class of 2013 was awarded more than $3 million in scholarship money and financial aid to attend college.

150 students attend the school, which has a maximum enrollment of 160.

The school is located in the Fleetwood section of Mt. Vernon.
