= Elaine McCusker =

American government official

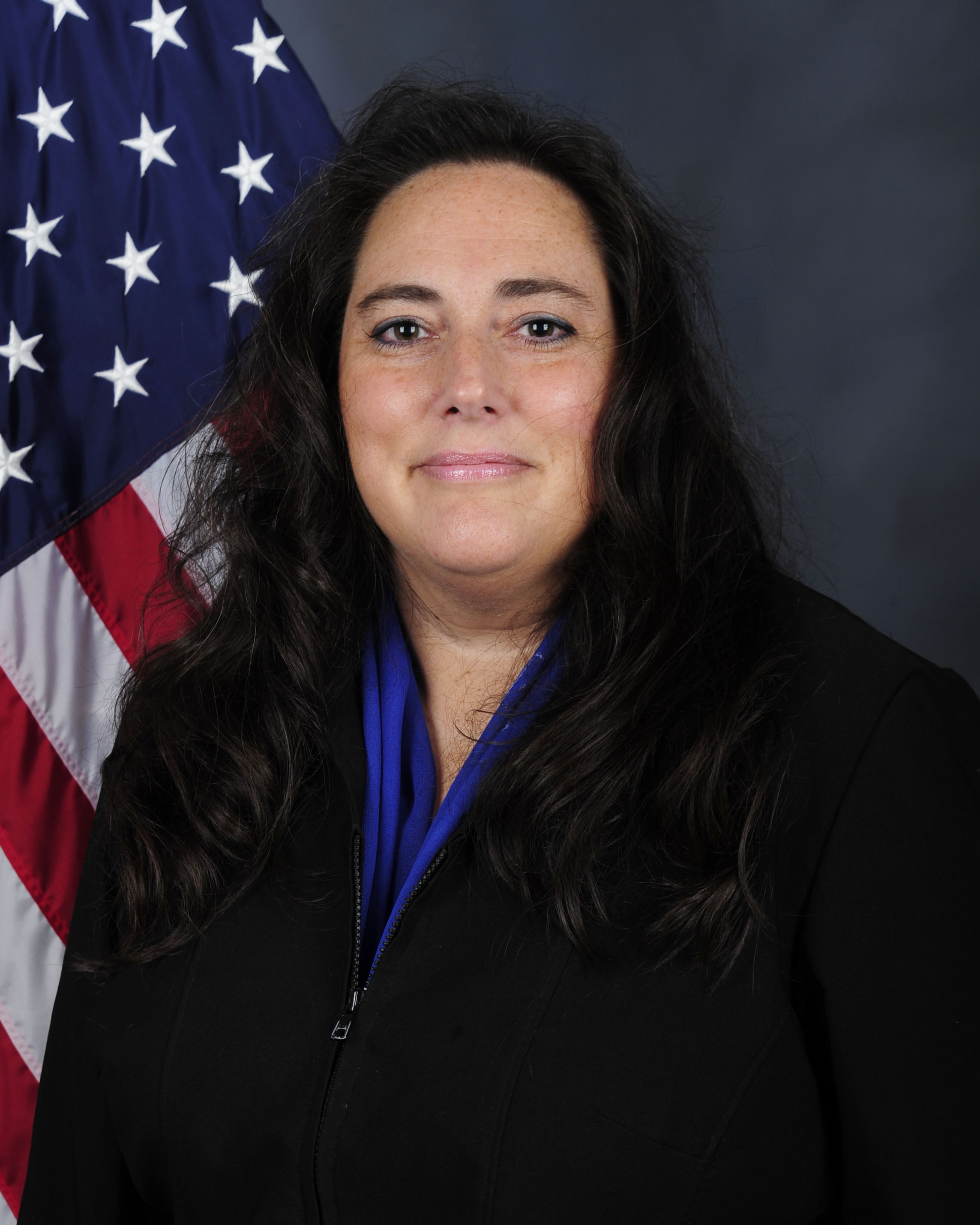

Acting Under Secretary of Defense (Comptroller)/CFO
- In office July 31, 2019 – June 26, 2020
- President: Donald Trump
- Preceded by: David Norquist
- Succeeded by: Thomas Harker (acting)

Personal details
- Born: Pekin, Illinois, U.S.
- Education: Illinois Central College; University of Dallas (BA)
- Awards: Navy Superior Civilian Service Award (2008); Secretary of Defense Exceptional Civilian Service Award (2011); Department of Defense Distinguished Civilian Service Award (2016)

Elaine A. McCusker is an American government official who served as Deputy Under Secretary of Defense (Comptroller), one of the offices of United States Principal Deputy Under Secretary of Defense, from 2017 to 2020.

McCusker was nominated by President Donald Trump to become United States Principal Deputy Under Secretary of Defense in April 2017 and was confirmed on August 1, 2017. In November 2019, the White House announced that McCusker would be nominated to succeed David Norquist as the Under Secretary of Defense (Comptroller). On March 2, 2020 it was reported that her nomination was being withdrawn by the White House following reports that in 2019 she had warned that freezing military aid to Ukraine might not be legal.

== Early life ==
McCusker is from Pekin, Illinois, one of the daughters of William and Kathleen Brown McCusker. Her father was chairman of the board of the Illinois Federation for Right to Life. She is a graduate of Peoria Notre Dame High School and Illinois Central College. In 1989 she received a Bachelor of Arts in political philosophy from the University of Dallas, Texas.

== Career ==
McCusker previously worked for the United States Energy Department's Argonne National Laboratory, the United States Senate Committee on Armed Services, the Pentagon Comptroller's office, and the Navy Department. At the Navy Department, she was a special assistant for the Mine-Resistant Ambush Protected vehicle program.

McCusker contributed to announcements in September 2019 regarding Trump's plan to divert Pentagon funds to build a wall along the U.S.-Mexico border. McCusker announced wall construction could begin as within three months on federally owned land. Construction of the wall on other government or privately owned land would commence at a later date, she noted.

McCusker was identified as one of the federal officials with knowledge of President Trump's effort to keep Ukraine from receiving aid authorized by Congress. Emails that she sent and received regarding the matter were included in documents obtained by the Center for Public Integrity in response to a Freedom of Information Act request. Michael Duffey, a political appointee in White House's Office of Management and Budget (OMB), emailed McCusker and others an hour and a half after Trump's call with Ukrainian leader Zelenskyy, requesting they "hold off" on distributing aid to Ukraine.

McCusker then sent emails to the OMB expressing concern that by withholding funds from Ukraine, the White House was violating the Impoundment Control Act, which requires that the executive branch spend appropriations that have been approved by Congress.

On June 16, 2020, she announced her resignation as Deputy Under Secretary, effective June 26.

== See also ==
- Trump–Ukraine scandal
- Impeachment inquiry against Donald Trump
- Impeachment of Donald Trump
