= Under Secretary of Defense (Comptroller) =

US Department of Defense official

Under Secretary of Defense (Comptroller) /Chief Financial Officer
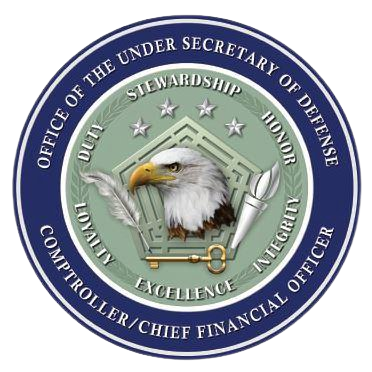
- Seal of the Under Secretary

- Under Secretary of Defense flag

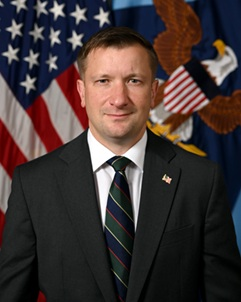
- Incumbent; Jules W. Hurst III since 12 August 2026
- Department of Defense; Office of the Secretary of Defense
- Style: The Honorable
- Reports to: Secretary of Defense; Deputy Secretary of Defense
- Seat: The Pentagon, Arlington County, Virginia, United States
- Appointer: The president; with Senate advice and consent
- Term length: No fixed term
- Constituting instrument: 10 U.S.C. § 135
- Precursor: Department of Defense Comptroller
- Formation: 1994
- First holder: John J. Hamre
- Succession: 7th in SecDef succession
- Salary: Executive Schedule, level III
- Website: comptroller.defense.gov

The Under Secretary of Defense (Comptroller)/Chief Financial Officer, abbreviated USD(C)/CFO or C/CFO, is a high level civilian official in the United States Department of Defense. The Under Secretary of Defense (Comptroller)/CFO is the principal staff assistant and adviser to both the Secretary of Defense and the Deputy Secretary of Defense for all budgetary and fiscal matters, including the development and execution of the Defense Department's annual budget.

The Under Secretary is appointed by the president and confirmed by the United States Senate to serve at the pleasure of the president.

The position of Defense Department Comptroller/CFO was originally at the rank of Assistant Secretary until the National Defense Authorization Act of 1995 upgraded the position to its current rank of Under Secretary.

== Overview ==
The Office of the Under Secretary of Defense (Comptroller)/CFO is the principal staff office for the Defense Department on all budgetary and fiscal matters, including the development and execution of the Defense Department's annual budget of more than $850 billion. As chief financial officer, the Under Secretary's Office also oversees the Department's financial policy, financial management systems, and business modernization efforts.

The Under Secretary is chair of the Financial Management Modernization Executive Committee, which has the goal of making sure that each of the Department of Defense's critical accounting, financial, and data feeder systems are compliant with applicable federal financial management and reporting requirements. The Comptroller is also a member of the Defense Business System Management Committee.

With the rank of Under Secretary, the USD(C)/CFO is a Level III position within the Executive Schedule. Since January 2019, the annual rate of pay for Level III is $176,900.

== Reporting officials ==
Officials reporting to the USD(C) include:

- Deputy Under Secretary of Defense (Comptroller)
- Director, Defense Contract Audit Agency
- Director, Defense Finance and Accounting Service
- Deputy Comptroller (Program/Budget)
- Deputy Chief Financial Officer
- Deputy Comptroller (Budget and Appropriation Affairs)
- Executive Director, Business Operations

The Deputy Under Secretary of Defense (Comptroller), abbreviated DUSD(C), is the USD(C)/CFO's chief deputy and assumes the duties of the USD(C)/CFO in his or her absence. Pursuant to Public Law 111-84, the DUSD(C) is appointed from civilian life by the president of the United States with the consent of the Senate.

== Budget ==
=== Budget features ===
- Comptroller Initiatives - Support for producing and providing senior Department leadership with authoritative, accurate, and timely financial statements and support Department-wide business transformation efforts by improving financial management processes, systems, and financial reporting. This funding appears to support the programs of the Defense Contract Audit Agency and the Defense Finance and Accounting Service.
- Future Years Defense Program (FYDP) Improvement - Maintain the FYDP information system used to collect, transform, disseminate, build reports, and provide analytical displays for planning, programming, budgeting, and execution activities
- Administrative Support - Funds services including general office support, data administration, records management, workflow and correspondence tracking, and other administrative tasks
- Next Generation Resource Management System (NGRMS) - Maintain IT system used to formulate, justify, present, and defend the DoD budget, including equipment maintenance support, software upgrades, and software licenses
- Enterprise Funds Distribution System Support (EFDSS) - Maintain IT system used for controlling and distributing funds, including equipment maintenance support, software upgrades, and software licenses

== Office holders ==
The table below includes both the various titles of this post over time, as well as all the holders of those offices.

Under Secretary of Defense (Comptroller/Chief Financial Officer)
Portrait	Name	Tenure	SecDef(s) served under	President(s) served under
Assistant Secretary of Defense (Comptroller)
	Wilfred J. McNeil	12 September 1949 – 1 November 1959	Louis A. Johnson; George C. Marshall; Robert A. Lovett; Charles E. Wilson; Neil H. McElroy	Harry Truman; Dwight Eisenhower
	Franklin B. Lincoln	2 December 1959 – 20 January 1961	Thomas S. Gates	Dwight Eisenhower
	Charles J. Hitch	17 February 1961 – 31 July 1965	Robert S. McNamara	John F. Kennedy; Lyndon Johnson
	Robert N. Anthony	10 September 1965 – 31 July 1968	Robert S. McNamara; Clark M. Clifford	Lyndon Johnson
	Robert C. Moot	1 August 1968 – 9 January 1973	Clark M. Clifford; Melvin R. Laird	Lyndon Johnson; Richard Nixon
	Don R. Brazier (Acting)	10 January 1973 – 20 January 1973	Melvin R. Laird	Richard Nixon
	Terence E. McClary	21 June 1973 – 31 August 1976	James R. Schlesinger; Donald H. Rumsfeld	Richard Nixon; Gerald Ford
	Fred P. Wacker	1 September 1976 – 29 February 1980	Donald H. Rumsfeld; Harold Brown	Gerald Ford; Jimmy Carter
	Jack R. Borsting	12 August 1980 – 31 December 1982	Harold Brown; Caspar W. Weinberger	Jimmy Carter; Ronald Reagan
	John R. Quetsch (Acting)	1 January 1983 – 23 February 1983	Caspar W. Weinberger	Ronald Reagan
	Vincent Puritano	24 February 1983 – 30 May 1984	Caspar W. Weinberger	Ronald Reagan
	John R. Quetsch (acting)	31 May 1984 – 14 August 1984	Caspar W. Weinberger	Ronald Reagan
	Robert W. Helm	16 August 1984 – 1 October 1986	Caspar W. Weinberger	Ronald Reagan
Department of Defense Comptroller
	Robert W. Helm	1 October 1986 – 1 September 1988	Caspar W. Weinberger; Frank C. Carlucci III	Ronald Reagan
	Clyde O. Glaister	17 October 1988 – 22 May 1989	Frank C. Carlucci III; William H. Taft IV (Acting); Richard B. Cheney	Ronald Reagan; George H. W. Bush
	Sean O'Keefe	22 May 1989 – 7 July 1992	Richard B. Cheney	George H. W. Bush
	Donald B. Shycoff (Acting)	8 July 1992 – 2 April 1993	Richard B. Cheney; Leslie Aspin, Jr.	George H. W. Bush; William Clinton
	Alice C. Maroni (Acting)	6 May 1993 – 26 October 1993	Leslie Aspin, Jr.	William Clinton
	John J. Hamre	26 October 1993 – 5 September 1994	Leslie Aspin, Jr. William J. Perry	William Clinton
Under Secretary of Defense (Comptroller)/Chief Financial Officer
	John J. Hamre	5 September 1994 – 29 July 1997	William J. Perry	Bill Clinton
	John J. Hamre	5 September 1994 – 29 July 1997	William S. Cohen	Bill Clinton
	William J. Lynn	19 November 1997 – 19 January 2001	William S. Cohen	Bill Clinton
	Dov S. Zakheim	3 May 2001 – 15 July 2004	Donald H. Rumsfeld	George W. Bush
	Lawrence J. Lanzillotta (Acting)	15 July 2004 – 27 July 2004	Donald H. Rumsfeld	George W. Bush
	Tina W. Jonas	27 July 2004 - 26 September 2008	Donald H. Rumsfeld	George W. Bush
	Tina W. Jonas	27 July 2004 - 26 September 2008	Robert M. Gates	George W. Bush
	Douglas A. Brook (Acting)	26 September 2008 – 20 January 2009	Robert M. Gates	George W. Bush
	Robert F. Hale	9 February 2009 – 27 June 2014	Robert M. Gates	Barack Obama
	Robert F. Hale	9 February 2009 – 27 June 2014	Leon Panetta	Barack Obama
	Robert F. Hale	9 February 2009 – 27 June 2014	Chuck Hagel	Barack Obama
	Michael J. McCord	27 June 2014 – 20 January 2017	Chuck Hagel	Barack Obama
	Michael J. McCord	27 June 2014 – 20 January 2017	Ash Carter	Barack Obama
	John P. Roth (Acting)	20 January 2017 – 1 June 2017	James Mattis	Donald Trump
	David Norquist	2 June 2017 – 31 July 2019	James Mattis	Donald Trump
	David Norquist	2 June 2017 – 31 July 2019	James Mattis; Patrick M. Shanahan (Acting)	Donald Trump
	Elaine McCusker (Acting)	31 July 2019 – 26 June 2020	Mark Esper	Donald Trump
	Thomas Harker (Acting)	26 June 2020 – 9 April 2021	Mark Esper	Donald Trump
	Anne McAndrew (Acting)	9 April 2021 – 3 June 2021	Lloyd Austin	Joe Biden
	Michael J. McCord	3 June 2021 – 20 January 2025	Lloyd Austin	Joe Biden
	Bryn Woollacott MacDonnell (Acting)	20 January 2025 – 9 August 2025	Pete Hegseth	Donald Trump
	Jules W. Hurst III (Acting)	11 August 2025 – 20 May 2026	Pete Hegseth	Donald Trump
	Michael T. Powers (Acting)	20 May 2026 – August 12, 2026	Pete Hegseth	Donald Trump
	Jules W. Hurst III	12 August 2026 – Present	Pete Hegseth	Donald Trump
