= Deborah P. Christie =

United States Assistant Secretary of the Navy

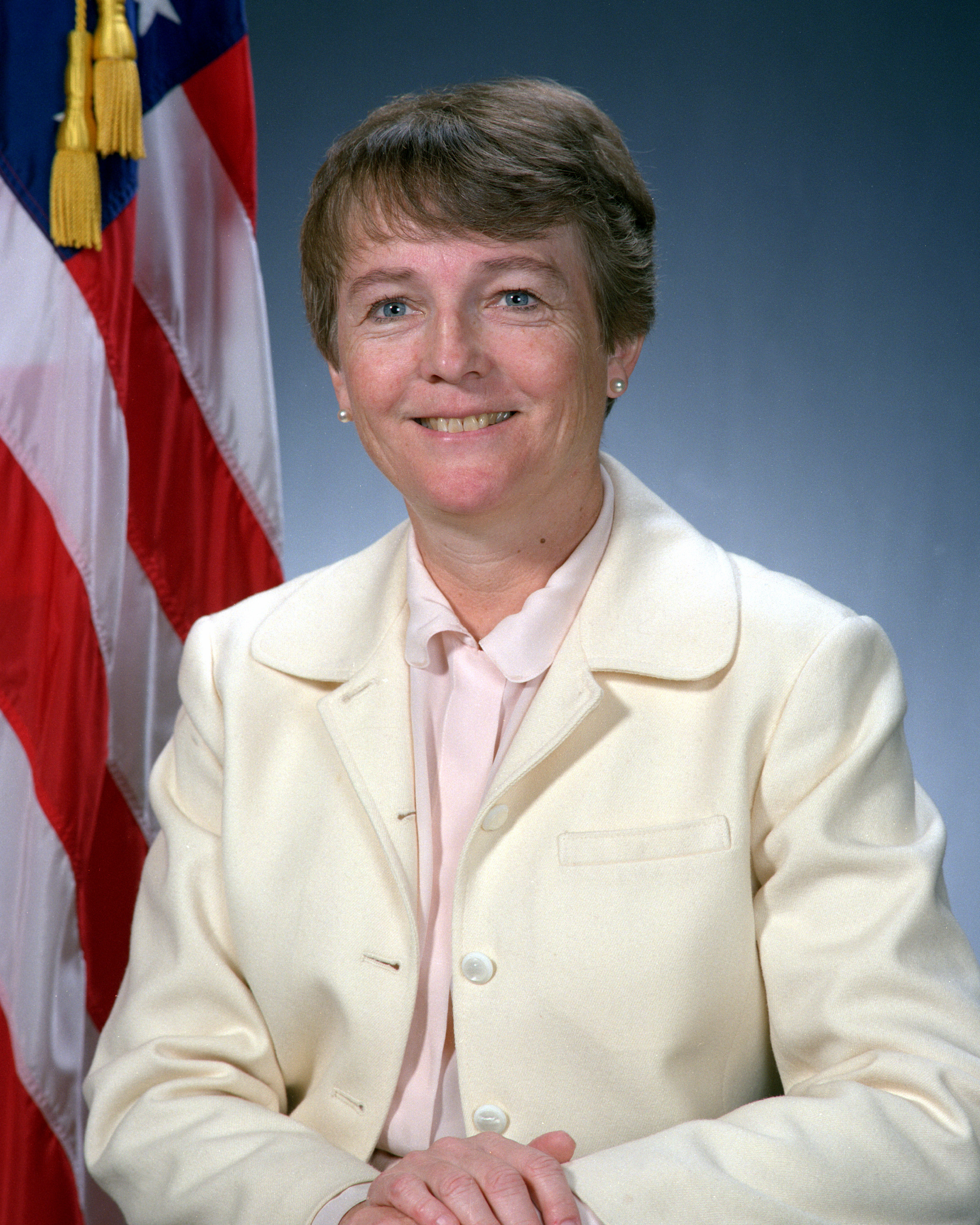
Deborah P. Christie in 1994

Deborah P. Christie is an American politician who served as the Assistant Secretary of the Navy (Financial Management and Comptroller) of the United States Department of the Navy from March 16, 1994 to March 12, 1998. She previously served as Deputy Director of Theater Assessments and Planning for Program Analysis and Evaluation at the United States Department of Defense. Christie earned a B.A. in Mathematics from Duke University and continued her studies at the University of Virginia.

Government offices
Preceded by Robert C. McCormack	Assistant Secretary of the Navy (Financial Management and Comptroller); March 16, 1994 – March 12, 1998	Succeeded by Gladys J. Commons
