= Russell Rumbaugh =

American defense official

R. Russell Rumbaugh
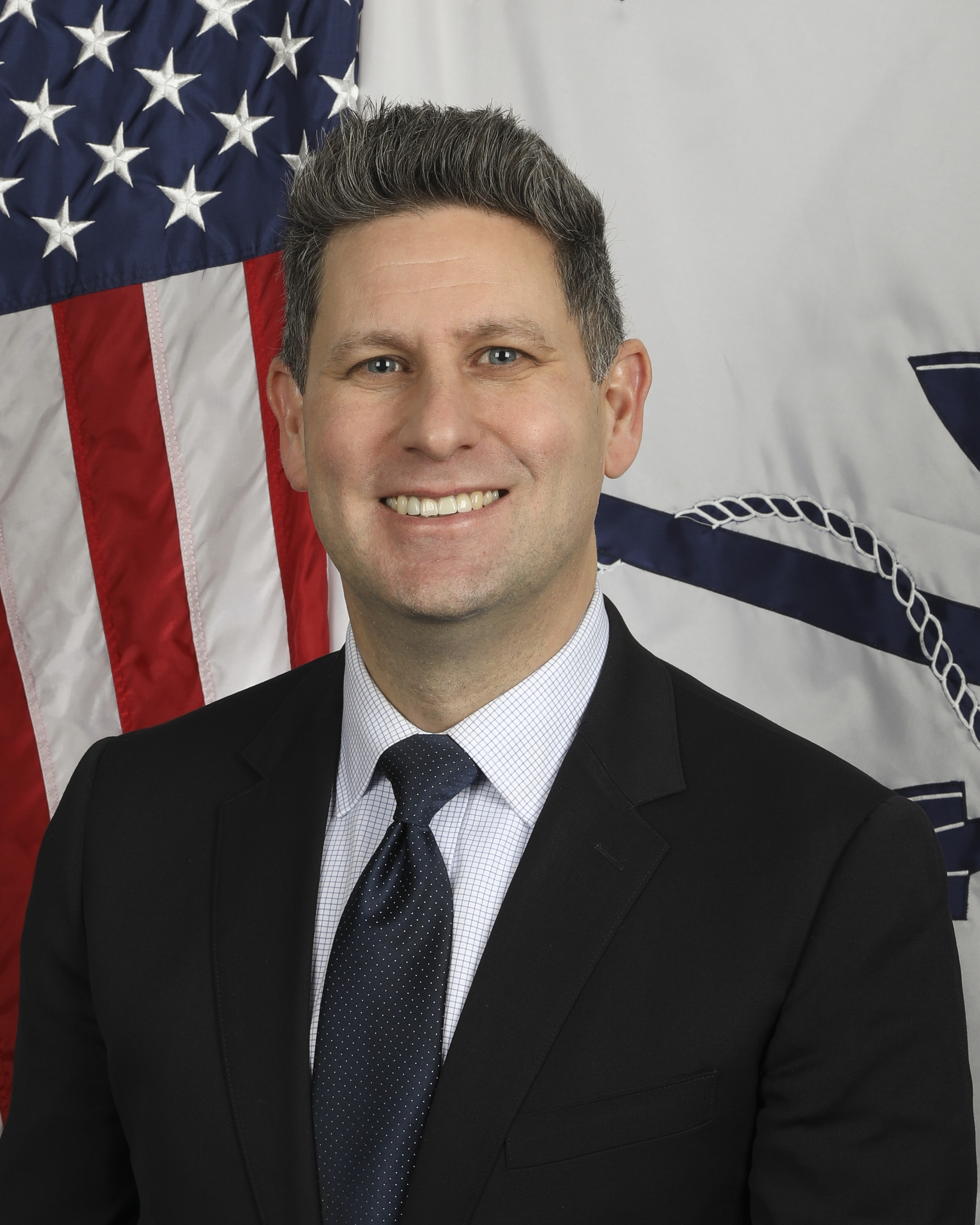

Assistant Secretary of the Navy (Financial Management and Comptroller)
- In office January 3, 2023 – January 20, 2025
- President: Joe Biden
- Preceded by: Thomas Harker

Personal details
- Education: University of Chicago (BA); Massachusetts Institute of Technology (SM)

Military service
- Branch/service: United States Army
- Years of service: 1998–2002

Russell Rumbaugh is an American defense policy advisor and former military officer who had served as assistant secretary of the Navy (financial management and comptroller).

== Early life and education ==
Rumbaugh was raised in Omaha, Nebraska. He earned a Bachelor of Arts degree in political science from the University of Chicago and a Master of Science in security studies from the Massachusetts Institute of Technology.

== Career ==
From 1998 to 2002, Rumbaugh served as an infantry officer in the United States Army. He later joined the Central Intelligence Agency, serving as a military analyst from 2004 to 2005. From 2005 to 2007, he served as an operations research analyst in the Office of the Secretary of Defense Program Analysis and Evaluation organization.

From 2007 to 2009, he served as a military legislative assistant for Congressman Jim Cooper. From 2009 to 2011, he served as a defense and international affairs analyst for the United States Senate Committee on the Budget. He also worked as a director of foreign affairs and defense budgeting at the Stimson Center. In 2015, Rumbaugh returned to the Office of the Secretary of Defense, serving as a special assistant to the director of cost assessment and program evaluation. In 2016 and 2017, he was a defense acquisition policy analyst for the Congressional Research Service. He joined the Aerospace Corporation in 2018, working as systems director in the Center for Space Policy and Strategy. Since 2019, he has also been an adjunct professor at Georgetown University.

In March 2022, President Joe Biden nominated Rumbaugh to be the assistant secretary of the Navy (financial management and comptroller). On December 20, 2022, the U.S. Senate voted 80-10 to confirm Rumbaugh. He was sworn in on January 3, 2023.
