= James M. Seely =

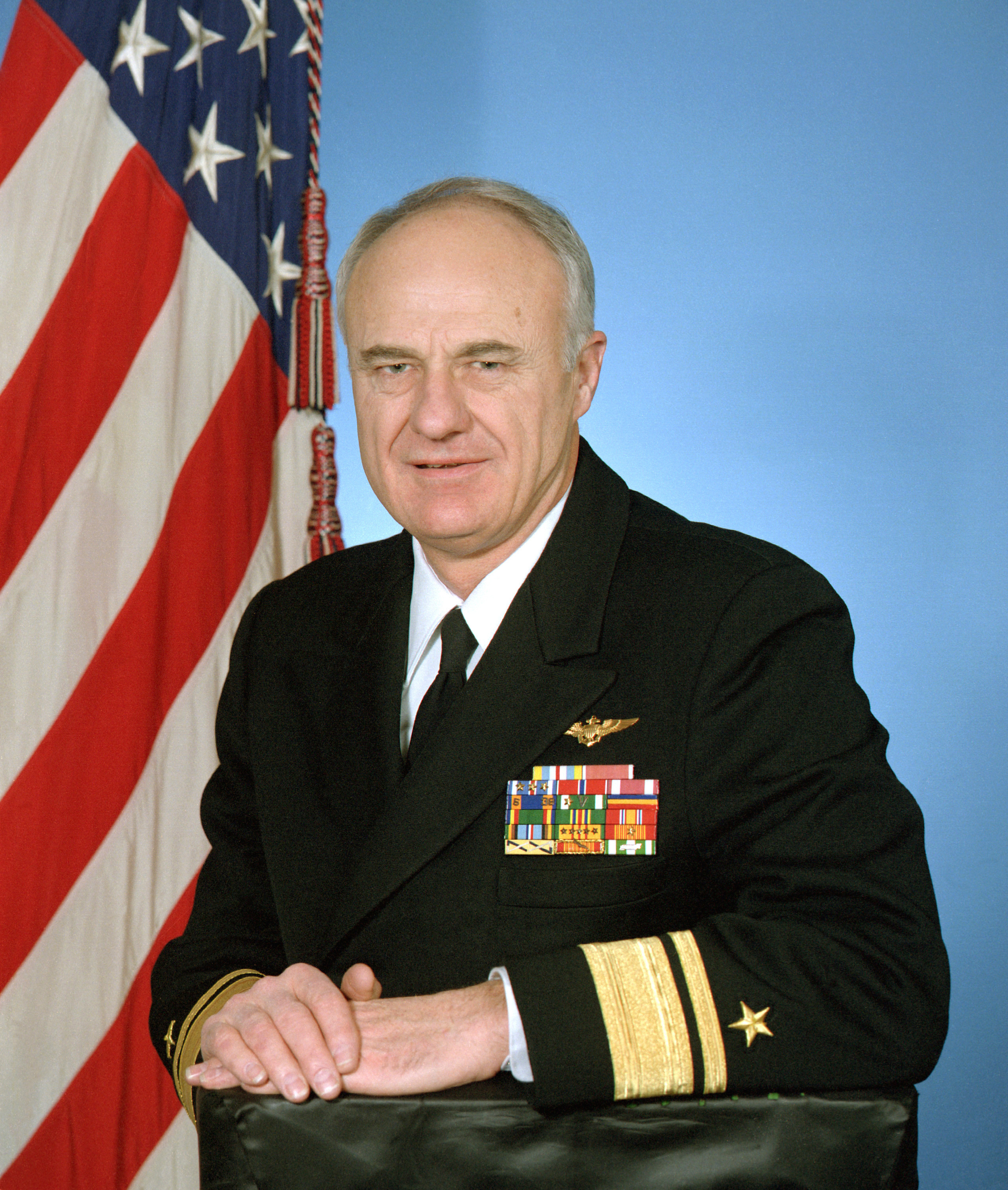
Rear Adm. Seely in 1992

James Michael Gleason "Jim" Seely (October 15, 1932 - June 3, 2017) was a Rear Admiral in the United States Navy and was the acting Assistant Secretary of the Navy (Financial Management and Comptroller) from December 18, 1988 to January 1990.

== Early life ==
Seely was born in Los Angeles, California to parents Louis and Mary Seely. He became an accomplished ocean swimmer and graduated from Newport Harbor High School in 1950. He attended UCLA where he was a member of the Naval ROTC and Sigma Pi fraternity. When he graduated in 1955 he received his commission as an ensign.

He married Gail Margaret Deverman on July 13, 1957 in Culver City, California. They had two children; a daughter, Nina, and a son, Ted. During their marriage they would move more than twenty-five times.

== Military career ==
Seely was on active duty from July 12, 1955 to October 1, 1989 during which time he acquired more than 5,000 hours of flight time as a naval aviator and made more than 1,000 carrier landings. He flew a total of four hundred forty-seven combat missions during the Vietnam War.

=== Early career ===
In 1958 Seely was deployed on the USS Midway (CV-41) to the first Taiwan Strait crisis to monitor the fighting between Chinese nationalist and communist fighter aircraft.

=== Vietnam war ===
Seely was on six combat tours in Vietnam. His first tour was from March to June 1966 when he flew fifty-nine combat missions from the USS Enterprise (CVN-65). His second tour was from January to June 1967 where he flew eight-nine combat missions from the USS Hancock (CVA-19). His third tour was from the USS Bon Homme Richard (CVA-31) from January to April 1968 where he flew fifty-six combat missions, some of which were to support the marines at Khe Sanh. He was on the USS Shangri-La (CVA-38) from March to December 1970 for his fourth tour where he flew ninety-seven combat missions. He was on the USS Constellation (CVA-64) for his fifth and sixth tours. His fifth tour, from October 1971 to June 1972 was his longest and he flew one hundred thirty-five combat missions, including missions in support of Operation Linebacker I. His sixth tour lasted from January to June in 1973 and he flew eleven missions.

During his first four tours he flew the A-4 Skyhawk. On his last two he flew the A-6 Intruder.

Combat Awards:

- 4 Distinguished Flying Crosses
- 43 Air Medals (5 individual and 38 strike/flight)
- 7 Navy Commendation Medals with combat "V" Presidential Unit Citation
- 1 Bronze Star
- 3 Legion of Merit awards
- 1 Defense Superior Service Award

=== Later career ===
After the war he attended the National War College in 1975 to 1976 after which he was assigned to the Pentagon until 1977. He went back to the Pentagon from 1979 to 1984. From 1982 to 1984 he was in the Office of the Joint Chiefs of Staff where he was the Director of Joint Analysis.

Aviation Commands:

- Commanded Officer, VA-165, Jul. 1972-Jun. 1973
- Commander, CVW-9, Jul. 1974-Jul. 1975
- Commanding Officer, NAS Whidbey Island, Aug. 1977-Sept. 1979
- Commander, Medium Attack and Tactical Electronic Warfare Wing for the U.S. Pacific Fleet (MATVAQWINGPAC), Sept. 1984 - Oct. 1986

He was promoted to rear admiral on October 1, 1986.

He returned to the Pentagon in 1986 and stayed there until his retirement in 1989. From 1986 to 1988 he was the Director of the Aviation Plans and Requirements Division. From 1988 to 1989 he was the Deputy/Acting Comptroller of the Navy. He held this post until January 1990, several months after his retirement from active duty.

Seely was a member of the Tailhook Association.

== Retirement ==
After retirement he ran a travel agency and became a consultant for the towns of Oak Harbor, Washington and Everett, Washington on base realignment and closings. We would later work with Boeing, General Electric, Northrop Grumman, Raytheon, and Textron. He was also involved with his local Catholic parish.

On November 5, 2012 he was one of group of five hundred retired generals and admirals who openly supported Mitt Romney for president.

On August 25, 2015, he was one of one hundred ninety retired generals and admirals to send a letter to congressional leaders asking them not to ratify the Iran nuclear deal.

He later worked for RRP Defense Consultants, and was on the Board of Directors for H2 Clipper, Inc.

He died at Novant Health Medical Center in Haymarket, Virginia. He is buried in Arlington National Cemetery along with his wife Gail Margaret Seely (December 8, 1935 - April 22, 2015).
