= United States Secretary of the Navy =

Statutory office and the head of the U.S. Department of the Navy

- Seal of the Department of the Navy

- Flag of the secretary

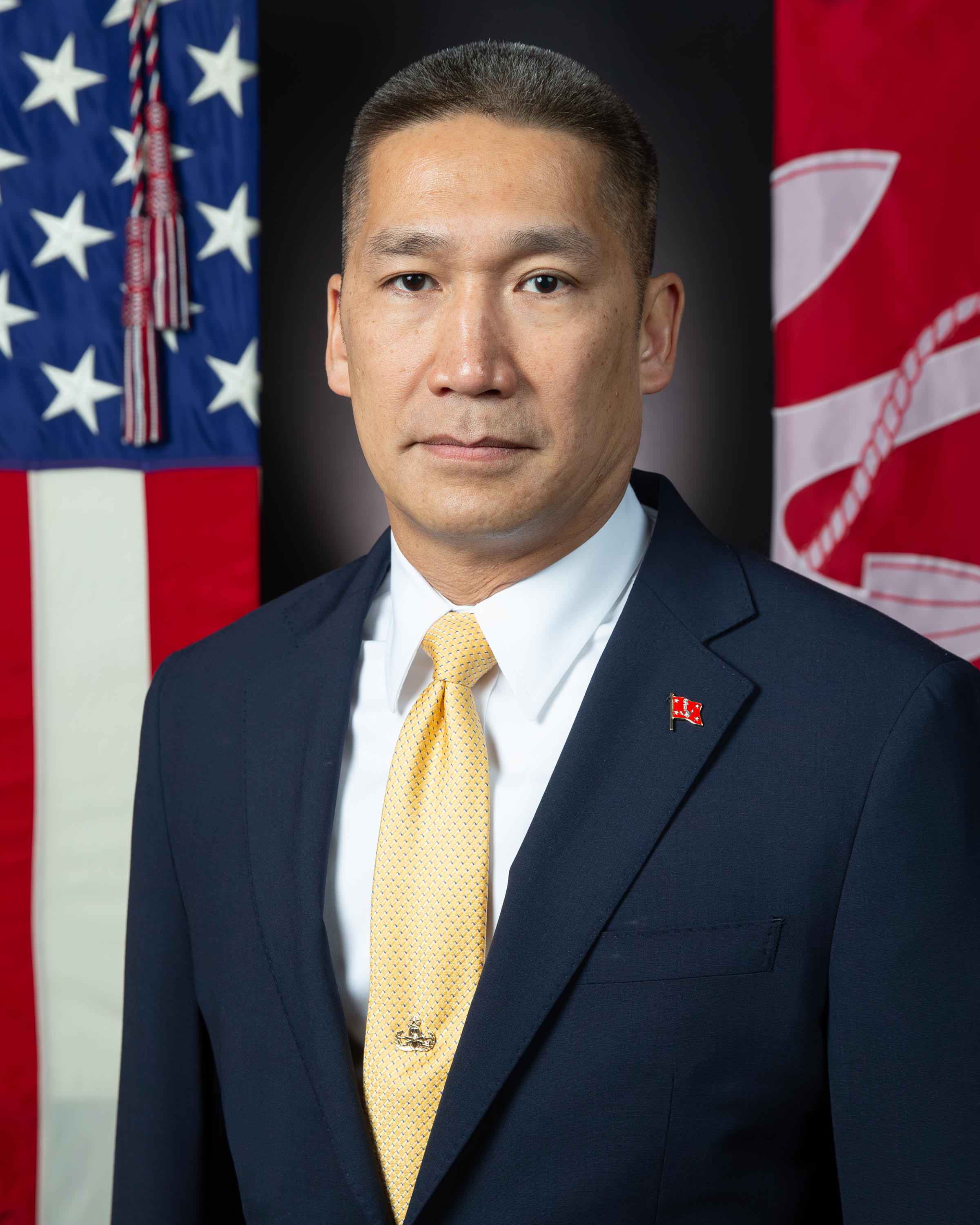
- Incumbent; Hung Cao; Acting since April 22, 2026
- Department of the Navy
- Style: Mister Secretary; The Honorable (formally)
- Abbreviation: SECNAV
- Reports to: Secretary of Defense; Deputy Secretary of Defense
- Appointer: The president; with Senate advice and consent
- Constituting instrument: 10 U.S.C. § 8013
- Formation: 18 June 1798; 228 years ago
- First holder: Benjamin Stoddert
- Succession: 3rd in SecDef succession
- Deputy: Under Secretary (Principal Civilian Deputy); Chief of Naval Operations (Navy Advisor and Deputy); Commandant (Marine Corps Advisor and Deputy)
- Salary: Executive Schedule, level II
- Website: www.secnav.navy.mil

The secretary of the Navy (SECNAV) is a statutory officer (10 U.S.C. § 8013) and the head (chief executive officer) of the Department of the Navy, a military department within the United States Department of Defense. On April 22, 2026, Hung Cao became acting Secretary of the Navy following the removal of John Phelan.

By law, the secretary of the Navy must be a civilian at least seven years removed from active military service (10 U.S.C. § 8013). The secretary is appointed by the president and requires confirmation by the Senate.

== History ==
The position of Secretary of the Navy was created in 1798. It was a member of the president's Cabinet until 1949, when the secretary of the Navy (and the secretaries of the Army and Air Force) were by amendments to the National Security Act of 1947 made subordinate to the secretary of defense.

From 2001 to 2019, proposals to rename the Department of the Navy to the Department of the Navy and Marine Corps, which would have also renamed the secretary of the Navy to the secretary of the Navy and Marine Corps, were introduced with wide support in the United States Congress, but failed due to the opposition of Senator and retired U.S. Navy officer John McCain.

== Responsibilities ==
The Department of the Navy (DoN) consists of two uniformed services: the United States Navy and the United States Marine Corps. The secretary of the Navy is responsible for, and has statutory authority (10 U.S.C. § 8013) to "conduct all the affairs of the Department of the Navy", i.e. as its chief executive officer, subject to the limits of the law, and the directions of the president and the secretary of defense. In effect, all authority within the Navy and Marine Corps, unless specifically exempted by law, is derivative of the authority vested in the secretary of the Navy.

Specifically enumerated responsibilities of the SECNAV in the aforementioned section are: recruiting, organizing, supplying, equipping, training, mobilizing, and demobilizing. The secretary also oversees the construction, outfitting, and repair of naval ships, equipment, and facilities. SECNAV is responsible for the formulation and implementation of policies and programs that are consistent with the national security policies and objectives established by the president or the secretary of defense.

The secretary of the Navy is a member of the Defense Acquisition Board (DAB), chaired by the under secretary of defense for acquisition, technology and logistics. Furthermore, the secretary has several statutory responsibilities under the Uniform Code of Military Justice (UCMJ) with respect to the administration of the military justice system for the Navy & the Marine Corps, including the authority to convene general courts-martial and to commute sentences.

The principal military advisers to the SECNAV are the two service chiefs of the naval services: for matters regarding the Navy the chief of naval operations (CNO), and for matters regarding the Marine Corps the commandant of the Marine Corps (CMC). The CNO and the Commandant act as the principal executive agents of the SECNAV within their respective services to implement the orders of the secretary.

=== Navy regulations ===
The United States Navy Regulations is the principal regulatory document of the Department of the Navy, and all changes to it must be approved by the secretary of the Navy.

=== U.S. Coast Guard ===
Whenever the United States Coast Guard operates as a service within the Department of the Navy, the secretary of the Navy has the same powers and duties with respect to the Coast Guard as the secretary of homeland security when the Coast Guard is not operating as a service in the Department of the Navy.

== Navy Secretariat ==
The Office of the Secretary of the Navy, also known within DoD as the Navy Secretariat or simply just as the Secretariat in a DoN setting, is the immediate headquarters staff that supports the secretary in discharging their duties. The principal officials of the Secretariat include the Under Secretary of the Navy (the secretary's principal civilian deputy), the assistant secretaries of the Navy (ASN), the general counsel of the Navy, the judge advocate general of the Navy (JAG), the naval inspector general (NIG), the chief of Legislative Affairs, and the chief of naval research. The Office of the Secretary of the Navy has sole responsibility within the Department of the Navy for acquisition, auditing, financial and information management, legislative affairs, and public affairs.

Pursuant to SecNavInst 5090.5F, the Department of the Navy Environmental Programs Manual, the secretary of the Navy and chief of naval operations recognize a number of commands annually for achievements in such areas as environmental quality, environmental cleanup, natural resources conservation, cultural resources management, pollution prevention, and recycling.

The chief of naval operations and the commandant of the Marine Corps have their own separate staffs, the Office of the Chief of Naval Operations (also known by its acronym OPNAV) and Headquarters Marine Corps, respectively.

== Line of Succession ==
If the Secretary of the Navy dies, resigns, is removed from office, is absent, or is disabled the people in the follow order serve as Acting Secretary:

#	Office
1	Under Secretary of the Navy
2*	Assistant Secretary of the Navy (Research, Development and Acquisition); Assistant Secretary of the Navy (Manpower and Reserve Affairs); Assistant Secretary of the Navy (Financial Management and Comptroller); Assistant Secretary of the Navy (Energy, Installations and Environment)
3	General Counsel of the Department of the Navy
4	Chief of Naval Operations
5	Commandant of the Marine Corps
	*Order of Succession is determined by the Secretary of Defense

== Secretaries of the Navy ==
Denotes acting secretaries

=== Continental Congress ===
Position	Portrait	Name	Term of office
Chairman of the Marine Committee		John Adams	13 October 1775 – 1779
Member of the Marine Committee		John Langdon	13 October 1775–?
Member of the Marine Committee		Silas Deane	13 October 1775–?
Member of the Marine Committee		Joseph Hewes	1775
Continental Navy Board (under Marine Committee)			6 November 1776 – 28 October 1779
Chairman of the Continental Board of Admiralty		Francis Lewis	December 1779 – 1780
Secretary of Marine		Alexander McDougall	7 February 1781 – 29 August 1781
Agent of Marine (devolved onto Superintendent of Finance)		Robert Morris	29 August 1781 – 1784

(Post of Secretary of Marine created but remained vacant)

=== Executive Department, 1798–1949 ===
Denotes an Acting United States Secretary of the Navy

No.	Portrait	Name	State	Start	End	President(s)
1		Benjamin Stoddert	Maryland	18 June 1798	31 March 1801	John Adams (1797–1801)
1		Benjamin Stoddert	Maryland	18 June 1798	31 March 1801	Thomas Jefferson (1801–1809)
2		Robert Smith	Maryland	27 July 1801	4 March 1809	Thomas Jefferson (1801–1809)
3		Paul Hamilton	South Carolina	15 May 1809	31 December 1812	James Madison (1809–1817)
4		William Jones	Pennsylvania	19 January 1813	1 December 1814	James Madison (1809–1817)
5		Benjamin Crowninshield	Massachusetts	16 January 1815	30 September 1818	James Madison (1809–1817)
5		Benjamin Crowninshield	Massachusetts	16 January 1815	30 September 1818	James Monroe (1817–1825)
6		Smith Thompson	New York	1 January 1819	31 August 1823	James Monroe (1817–1825)
7		Samuel L. Southard	New Jersey	16 September 1823	4 March 1829	James Monroe (1817–1825)
7		Samuel L. Southard	New Jersey	16 September 1823	4 March 1829	John Quincy Adams (1825–1829)
8		John Branch	North Carolina	9 March 1829	12 May 1831	Andrew Jackson (1829–1837)
9		Levi Woodbury	New Hampshire	23 May 1831	30 June 1834	Andrew Jackson (1829–1837)
10		Mahlon Dickerson	New Jersey	1 July 1834	30 June 1838	Andrew Jackson (1829–1837)
10		Mahlon Dickerson	New Jersey	1 July 1834	30 June 1838	Martin Van Buren (1837–1841)
11		James K. Paulding	New York	1 July 1838	4 March 1841	Martin Van Buren (1837–1841)
12		George E. Badger	North Carolina	6 March 1841	11 September 1841	William Henry Harrison (1841)
12		George E. Badger	North Carolina	6 March 1841	11 September 1841	John Tyler (1841–1845)
13		Abel P. Upshur	Virginia	11 October 1841	23 July 1843	John Tyler (1841–1845)
14		David Henshaw	Massachusetts	24 July 1843	18 February 1844	John Tyler (1841–1845)
15		Thomas W. Gilmer	Virginia	19 February 1844	28 February 1844	John Tyler (1841–1845)
16		John Y. Mason	Virginia	26 March 1844	4 March 1845	John Tyler (1841–1845)
17		George Bancroft	Massachusetts	11 March 1845	9 September 1846	James K. Polk (1845–1849)
18		John Y. Mason	Virginia	10 September 1846	4 March 1849	James K. Polk (1845–1849)
19		William B. Preston	Virginia	8 March 1849	22 July 1850	Zachary Taylor (1849–1850)
20		William Graham	North Carolina	2 August 1850	25 July 1852	Millard Fillmore (1850–1853)
21		John P. Kennedy	Maryland	26 July 1852	4 March 1853	Millard Fillmore (1850–1853)
22		James C. Dobbin	North Carolina	8 March 1853	4 March 1857	Franklin Pierce (1853–1857)
23		Isaac Toucey	Connecticut	7 March 1857	4 March 1861	James Buchanan (1857–1861)
24		Gideon Welles	Connecticut	7 March 1861	4 March 1869	Abraham Lincoln (1861–1865)
24		Gideon Welles	Connecticut	7 March 1861	4 March 1869	Andrew Johnson (1865–1869)
25		Adolph E. Borie	Pennsylvania	9 March 1869	25 June 1869	Ulysses S. Grant (1869–1877)
26		George M. Robeson	New Jersey	26 June 1869	4 March 1877	Ulysses S. Grant (1869–1877)
Acting		William Faxon		4 March 1877	13 March 1877	Rutherford B. Hayes (1877–1881)
27		Richard W. Thompson	Indiana	13 March 1877	20 December 1880	Rutherford B. Hayes (1877–1881)
28		Nathan Goff Jr.	West Virginia	7 January 1881	4 March 1881	Rutherford B. Hayes (1877–1881)
29		William H. Hunt	Louisiana	7 March 1881	16 April 1882	James A. Garfield (1881)
29		William H. Hunt	Louisiana	7 March 1881	16 April 1882	Chester A. Arthur (1881–1885)
30		William E. Chandler	New Hampshire	16 April 1882	4 March 1885	Chester A. Arthur (1881–1885)
31		William C. Whitney	New York	7 March 1885	4 March 1889	Grover Cleveland (1885–1889)
32		Benjamin F. Tracy	New York	6 March 1889	4 March 1893	Benjamin Harrison (1889–1893)
33		Hilary A. Herbert	Alabama	7 March 1893	4 March 1897	Grover Cleveland (1893–1897)
34		John Davis Long	Massachusetts	6 March 1897	30 April 1902	William McKinley (1897–1901)
34		John Davis Long	Massachusetts	6 March 1897	30 April 1902	Theodore Roosevelt (1901–1909)
35		William Moody	Massachusetts	1 May 1902	30 June 1904	Theodore Roosevelt (1901–1909)
36		Paul Morton	Illinois	1 July 1904	30 June 1905	Theodore Roosevelt (1901–1909)
37		Charles Bonaparte	Maryland	1 July 1905	16 December 1906	Theodore Roosevelt (1901–1909)
38		Victor H. Metcalf	California	17 December 1906	30 November 1908	Theodore Roosevelt (1901–1909)
39		Truman Handy Newberry	Michigan	1 December 1908	4 March 1909	Theodore Roosevelt (1901–1909)
40		George von Lengerke Meyer	Massachusetts	6 March 1909	4 March 1913	William Howard Taft (1909–1913)
41		Josephus Daniels	North Carolina	5 March 1913	4 March 1921	Woodrow Wilson (1913–1921)
42		Edwin Denby	Michigan	6 March 1921	10 March 1924	Warren G. Harding (1921–1923)
42		Edwin Denby	Michigan	6 March 1921	10 March 1924	Calvin Coolidge (1923–1929)
Acting		Theodore Roosevelt Jr.		10 March 1924	19 March 1924	Calvin Coolidge (1923–1929)
43		Curtis D. Wilbur	California	19 March 1924	4 March 1929	Calvin Coolidge (1923–1929)
44		Charles Francis Adams III	Massachusetts	5 March 1929	4 March 1933	Herbert Hoover (1929–1933)
45		Claude A. Swanson	Virginia	4 March 1933	7 July 1939	Franklin D. Roosevelt (1933–1945)
46		Charles Edison	New Jersey	7 July 1939	2 January 1940	Franklin D. Roosevelt (1933–1945)
46		Charles Edison	New Jersey	2 January 1940	24 June 1940	Franklin D. Roosevelt (1933–1945)
Acting		Lewis Compton		24 June 1940	11 July 1940	Franklin D. Roosevelt (1933–1945)
47		Frank Knox	Illinois	11 July 1940	28 April 1944	Franklin D. Roosevelt (1933–1945)
Acting		Ralph Austin Bard		28 April 1944	19 May 1944	Franklin D. Roosevelt (1933–1945)
48		James Forrestal	New York	19 May 1944	17 September 1947	Franklin D. Roosevelt (1933–1945)
48		James Forrestal	New York	19 May 1944	17 September 1947	Harry S. Truman (1945–1953)
49		John Sullivan	New Hampshire	18 September 1947	24 May 1949	Harry S. Truman (1945–1953)
50		Francis P. Matthews	Nebraska	25 May 1949	10 August 1949	Harry S. Truman (1945–1953)

=== Military Department (Department of Defense), 1949–present ===
Denotes an Acting United States Secretary of the Navy

No.	Portrait	Name	Term of office			President(s)
No.	Portrait	Name	Start	End	Duration (Days)	President(s)
50		Francis P. Matthews	10 August 1949	31 July 1951	797	Harry S. Truman (1945–1953)
51		Dan A. Kimball	31 July 1951	20 January 1953	539	Harry S. Truman (1945–1953)
52		Robert Anderson	4 February 1953	3 March 1954	392	Dwight D. Eisenhower (1953–1961)
53		Charles Thomas	3 May 1954	1 April 1957	1064	Dwight D. Eisenhower (1953–1961)
54		Thomas S. Gates Jr.	1 April 1957	8 June 1959	798	Dwight D. Eisenhower (1953–1961)
55		William B. Franke	8 June 1959	19 January 1961	591	Dwight D. Eisenhower (1953–1961)
56		John Connally	25 January 1961	20 December 1961	329	John F. Kennedy (1961–1963)
57		Fred Korth	4 January 1962	1 November 1963	666	John F. Kennedy (1961–1963)
Acting		Paul B. Fay	2 November 1963	28 November 1963	26	John F. Kennedy (1961–1963)
Acting		Paul B. Fay	2 November 1963	28 November 1963	26	Lyndon B. Johnson (1963–1969)
58		Paul Nitze	29 November 1963	30 June 1967	1309	Lyndon B. Johnson (1963–1969)
Acting		Charles F. Baird	1 July 1967	31 August 1967	61	Lyndon B. Johnson (1963–1969)
59		Paul Ignatius	1 September 1967	24 January 1969	511	
59		Paul Ignatius	1 September 1967	24 January 1969	511	Richard Nixon (1969–1974)
60		John Chafee	31 January 1969	4 May 1972	1189	Richard Nixon (1969–1974)
61		John Warner	4 May 1972	8 April 1974	704	Richard Nixon (1969–1974)
62		J. William Middendorf	8 April 1974	20 January 1977	1018	Richard Nixon (1969–1974)
62		J. William Middendorf	8 April 1974	20 January 1977	1018	Gerald Ford (1974–1977)
63		W. Graham Claytor Jr.	14 February 1977	24 August 1979	921	Jimmy Carter (1977–1981)
64		Edward Hidalgo	24 October 1979	20 January 1981	454	Jimmy Carter (1977–1981)
65		John Lehman	5 February 1981	10 April 1987	2255	Ronald Reagan (1981–1989)
66		Jim Webb	1 May 1987	23 February 1988	298	Ronald Reagan (1981–1989)
67		William L. Ball	28 March 1988	15 May 1989	413	Ronald Reagan (1981–1989)
67		William L. Ball	28 March 1988	15 May 1989	413	George H. W. Bush (1989–1993)
68		Henry L. Garrett III	15 May 1989	26 June 1992	1138	George H. W. Bush (1989–1993)
Acting		Daniel Howard	26 June 1992	7 July 1992	11	George H. W. Bush (1989–1993)
69		Sean O'Keefe	7 July 1992	2 October 1992	87	George H. W. Bush (1989–1993)
69		Sean O'Keefe	2 October 1992	20 January 1993	110	George H. W. Bush (1989–1993)
Acting		Frank Kelso	20 January 1993	21 July 1993	182	Bill Clinton (1993–2001)
70		John H. Dalton	22 July 1993	16 November 1998	1943	Bill Clinton (1993–2001)
71		Richard Danzig	16 November 1998	20 January 2001	796	Bill Clinton (1993–2001)
Acting		Robert B. Pirie Jr.	20 January 2001	24 May 2001	124	George W. Bush (2001–2009)
72		Gordon R. England	24 May 2001	30 January 2003	616	George W. Bush (2001–2009)
Acting		Susan Livingstone	30 January 2003	7 February 2003	8	George W. Bush (2001–2009)
Acting		Hansford T. Johnson	7 February 2003	30 September 2003	235	George W. Bush (2001–2009)
73		Gordon R. England	1 October 2003	29 December 2005	820	George W. Bush (2001–2009)
Acting		Dionel M. Aviles	29 December 2005	3 January 2006	5	George W. Bush (2001–2009)
74		Donald C. Winter	3 January 2006	13 March 2009	1165	George W. Bush (2001–2009)
74		Donald C. Winter	3 January 2006	13 March 2009	1165	Barack Obama (2009–2017)
Acting		B. J. Penn	13 March 2009	19 May 2009	67	Barack Obama (2009–2017)
75		Ray Mabus	19 May 2009	20 January 2017	2803	Barack Obama (2009–2017)
Acting		Sean Stackley	20 January 2017	3 August 2017	195	Donald Trump (2017–2021)
76		Richard V. Spencer	3 August 2017	15 July 2019	711	Donald Trump (2017–2021)
Acting		Thomas Modly	15 July 2019	31 July 2019	16	Donald Trump (2017–2021)
76		Richard V. Spencer	31 July 2019	24 November 2019	116	Donald Trump (2017–2021)
Acting		Thomas Modly	24 November 2019	7 April 2020	135	Donald Trump (2017–2021)
Acting		James E. McPherson	7 April 2020	29 May 2020	52	Donald Trump (2017–2021)
77		Kenneth Braithwaite	29 May 2020	20 January 2021	236	Donald Trump (2017–2021)
Acting		Thomas Harker	20 January 2021	9 August 2021	201	Joe Biden (2021–2025)
78		Carlos Del Toro	9 August 2021	20 January 2025	1260	Joe Biden (2021–2025)
Acting		Terence Emmert	20 January 2025	25 March 2025	64	Donald Trump (2025–present)
79		John Phelan	25 March 2025	22 April 2026	393	Donald Trump (2025–present)
Acting		Hung Cao	22 April 2026	Incumbent	211	Donald Trump (2025–present)

== See also ==
- Military awards of the United States Department of the Navy
- Secretary of the Navy Council of Review Boards
- Stephen Mallory, the only Secretary of the Navy of the Confederate States of America
