= OPSD =

OPSD may refer to:

- Skardu International Airport (ICAO code: OPSD)
- Open Power System Data
- Operating Plants Safety Division of the Indian Atomic Energy Regulatory Board
- Operations Directorate of the Australian Air Force Cadets
