= Fichier des personnes décédées =

Central death register of France

The Fichier des personnes décédées (transl. Register of deceased persons) is a central register of persons who have died in France since 1970. It is maintained by the national statistics bureau Institut national de la statistique et des études économiques (Insee). Since October 2019, the register has been accessible online free of charge and without registration.

== Data in the register ==
The register contains deaths since 1970, inclusively. For the current year, there are monthly and quarterly files. For past years, the data are summarised in one file per calendar year.

Each entry concerns one person and contains the surname, first names, sex, date of birth, the Insee code of the place of birth (or country of birth for those born abroad), the name of the place of birth (for those born abroad also the name of the country of birth), the date of death, the Insee code of the place of death and the number in the death register of the respective municipality. The text fields contain only capital letters without diacritics.

Each data set is included in the file that corresponds to its date of processing at the Insee, not the date of death. The law gives French civil registry offices one week to report deaths to the Insee. For reports submitted in paper form by traditional mail, postal delivery and processing at the statistics bureau will cause an additional delay before the data are recorded. Public holidays or other circumstances affecting the work of the authorities involved may also cause delays. A file of the register published by Insee for a given period therefore usually contains a significant number of entries for previous reporting periods; conversely, not all deaths occurring during the reporting period are included in the file for that period. For example, the monthly file for March 2020 contained about 8,700 entries concerning deaths before 1 March, but the file was missing 9,500 cases of deaths in March that were not recorded until April.

For this reason, the numbers of deaths listed in the monthly files of the death register do not correspond to consolidated death statistics per period, such as the figures published by the Insee since the beginning of the COVID-19 pandemic in France, broken down by département.

== Access ==
Until 2017, access to the central death register was available only to certain commercial genealogy services, which Insee charged about 7,000 euros per year. Access subsequently became free of charge, but remained restricted to authorized companies bound by a licensing agreement with Insee.

However, on 17 May 2019, the French state's commission in charge of questions related to freedom of information and access to official data, CADA (Commission d'accès aux documents administratifs), decided at the request of a genealogical association that the central death register must immediately be made publicly accessible. The commission argued that the register was a set of administrative documents not containing any personal data in need of protection, since the persons concerned were not alive anymore. This sets the register apart from other civil status databases such as birth and marriage registers, for which a protection period of 75 years applies in France. For the same reason, the European Union's General Data Protection Regulation was not applicable, according to CADA.

Following this decision, the Insee made the data freely available in October 2019 under the Open License for French government data. Today, they are accessible from at least two official web portals: the French state's open data portal data.gouv.fr and the Insee website, insee.fr. There is no legal guarantee for the correctness of the data.

On data.gouv.fr and on insee.fr the data can be downloaded as text files, although the file formats are not identical on both sites. Neither of the two sites offers search and display functionality for the data, and the Insee encoding of places is not resolved. However, since the further use of the data is not significantly restricted by the license terms, several genealogy services and other web service providers, such as Geneanet or Filae, offer all this functionality on their web portals. Some of these services require registration and/or a subscription, while others, such as deces.matchid.io, can be accessed free of charge and without registration.
