= Deep Decarbonization Pathways initiative =

Global sustainable energy consortium

Deep Decarbonization Pathways Project
- Abbreviation: DDPP
- Formation: October 2013 (12 years ago)
- Purpose: Practical pathways to deep greenhouse gas emissions reductions using country-based energy research
- Headquarters: 27 rue Saint-Guillaume, 75337 Paris Cedex 07, France
- Key people: Teresa Ribera, Jeffrey Sachs, Michel Colombier, Guido Schmidt-Traub, Jim Williams, Henri Waisman, Laura Segafredo, Roberta Pierfederici, Léna Spinazzé
- Website: ddpinitiative.org

The Deep Decarbonization Pathways initiative (DDPi) is a global consortium formed in 2013 which researches methods to limit the rise of global temperature due to global warming to 2 °C or less. The focus of the DDPP is on decarbonization pathways for sustainable energy systems, other sectors of the economy, such as agriculture and land-use, are not directly considered.

== Methods ==
Analyses of possible scenarios assume no major changes in culture and rely on existing technology. They assume no major changes in the lifestyles of people in developed countries and do not include possible future technologies such as nuclear fusion. Population growth of 1% per year and economic growth of 3% is assumed. Analyses show a need for continued research on energy technologies.

The DDPi rejects an incrementalist approach to climate protection. Instead, meeting the climate change mitigation challenge (as set out in the 2015 Paris Agreement) will require backcasting to a suitable attractor, such as complete decarbonization. This method allows short-term policy options to be developed that are consistent with the selected long-term target. Even so, there are numerous possible deep decarbonization pathways (DDP) for each country and stakeholders and policymakers will need to debate and choose one, building the necessary political consensus as they go. DDPs can help avoid dead-end investments that reduce emissions in the short-term but obstruct deep decarbonization in the long-term and thereby reduce the risk of becoming stranded.

In 2016, the project proposed a new conceptual decision framework for deep development pathways analysis across its 16 participating countries. This includes an agenda for the further development of modelling methodologies. A key motivation is to address the "intertwined goals of transparency, communicability and policy credibility."

== Findings ==
DDPP's analyses show that meeting a goal of limiting the rise of global temperature due to 2 °C or less is barely possible using existing technology, if it were deployed, however long term plans are not in place to do so.

As of early 2016, the DDPP was composed of energy researchers and institutions across the following economies and covering 74% of global energy-related greenhouse gas emissions: Australia, Brazil, Canada, China, France, Germany, India, Indonesia, Italy, Japan, Mexico, Russia, South Africa, South Korea, the UK and the US. The 2015 global synthesis and country reports can be downloaded. Country-specific modelling varied in its sophistication. Some countries accounted for land-use change effects and the macroeconomic impacts on GDP, welfare, and economic structure, while other did not.

== See also ==
- Climate change mitigation
- Climate change mitigation scenarios
- Energy modeling
- Energy Modeling Forum, and in particular EMF22
- Jeffrey Sachs, one of the founders of the Deep Decarbonization Pathways Project
- Open Energy Modelling Initiative
