= Primary energy =

Energy form not subjected to any human conversion process

World total primary energy consumption by type in 2020
1. Oil (31.2%)
2. Coal (27.2%)
3. Natural Gas (24.7%)
4. Hydro (renewables) (6.90%)
5. Nuclear (4.30%)
6. Others (renewables) (5.70%)
World total primary energy supply of 162,494 TWh (or 13,792 Mtoe) by region in 2017 (IEA, 2019)
1. OECD (38.0%)
2. Middle East (5.40%)
3. Non-OECD Europe /Eurasia (8.00%)
4. China (22.0%)
5. Non-OECD Asia (w/o China) (13.4%)
6. Non-OECD Americas (4.40%)
7. Africa (5.80%)
8. Bunkers (marine/air) (3.00%)

Primary energy (PE) is the energy found in nature that has not been subjected to any human engineered conversion process. It encompasses energy contained in raw fuels and other forms of energy, including waste, received as input to a system. Primary energy can be non-renewable or renewable.

Total primary energy supply (TPES) is the sum of production and imports, plus or minus stock changes, minus exports and international bunker storage. The International Recommendations for Energy Statistics (IRES) prefers total energy supply (TES) to refer to this indicator. These expressions are often used to describe the total energy supply of a national territory.

Secondary energy is a carrier of energy, such as electricity. These are produced by conversion from a primary energy source.

Primary energy is used as a measure in energy statistics in the compilation of energy balances, as well as in the field of energetics. In energetics, a primary energy source (PES) refers to the energy forms required by the energy sector to generate the supply of energy carriers used by human society. Primary energy only counts raw energy and not usable energy and fails to account well for energy losses, particularly the large losses in thermal sources. It therefore generally grossly overcounts the usefulness of thermal renewable energy sources and by comparison undercounts sources like renewables that produce secondary energy.

== Examples of sources ==
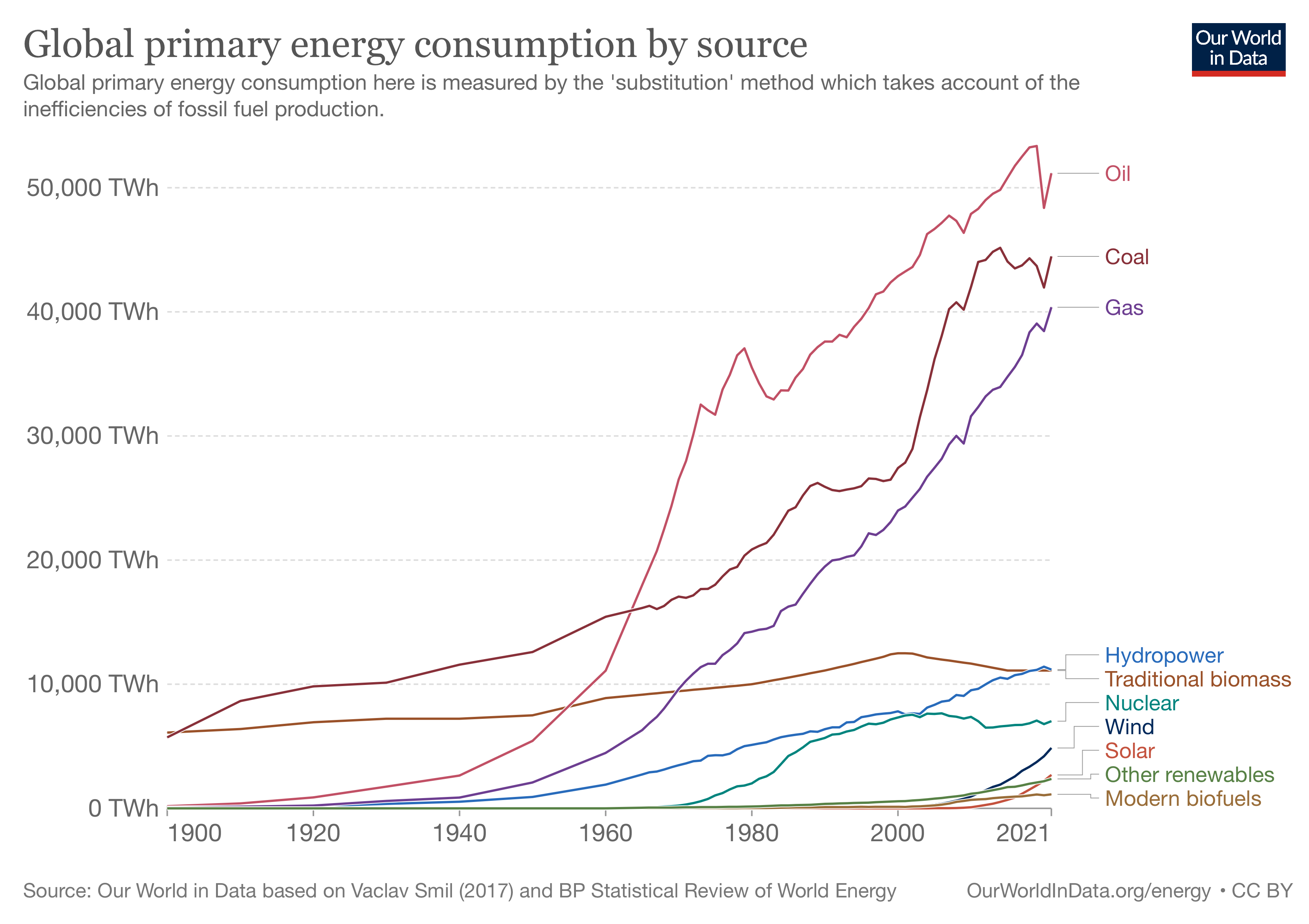
Global primary energy consumption by source

Share of fossil fuels, nuclear and renewable energy in global primary energy consumption

Primary energy sources should not be confused with the energy system components (or conversion processes) through which they are converted into energy carriers.

Primary energy sources			converted by	Energy system component	to	Energy carriers (main)
Non-renewable (Note: At the scale of earth sciences, all primary energy sources can be considered to be renewable. The non-renewable essence of resources (PES) is due to the scale of needs within human society. In certain situations, the use of resources by human society is performed at a much higher rate than the minimum rate at which it can be geophysically renewed. This is the rationale behind the differentiation between non-renewable primary energy sources (oil, coal, gas, uranium) and renewable primary energy sources (wind, solar, hydro).)	Fossil fuels	Oil (or crude oil)	converted by	Oil refinery	to	Fuel oil
Non-renewable	Fossil fuels	Coal or natural gas	converted by	Fossil fuel power station	to	Enthalpy, mechanical work or electricity
Non-renewable	Mineral fuels	Natural uranium (Note: Some nuclear fuels, such as plutonium or depleted uranium, are also used in nuclear fission power plants. However, they cannot be considered to be primary energy sources as they cannot be found in nature in any quantity. Indeed, there must be a consumption of natural uranium (primary energy source) in order to make these other nuclear fuels available.)	converted by	Nuclear power plant (thermonuclear fission)	to	Electricity
Non-renewable	Mineral fuels	Natural thorium	converted by	Thorium breeder reactor	to	Enthalpy or electricity
Renewable		Solar energy	converted by	Photovoltaic power plant (see also Solar power)	to	Electricity
Renewable		Solar energy	converted by	Solar power tower, solar furnace (see also Solar thermal energy)	to	Enthalpy
Renewable		Wind energy	converted by	Wind farm (see also Wind power)	to	Mechanical work or electricity
Renewable		Falling and flowing water, tidal energy	converted by	Hydropower station, wave farm, tidal power station	to	Mechanical work or electricity
Renewable		Biomass sources	converted by	Biomass power plant	to	Enthalpy or electricity
Renewable		Geothermal energy	converted by	Geothermal power station	to	Enthalpy or electricity

== Usable energy ==
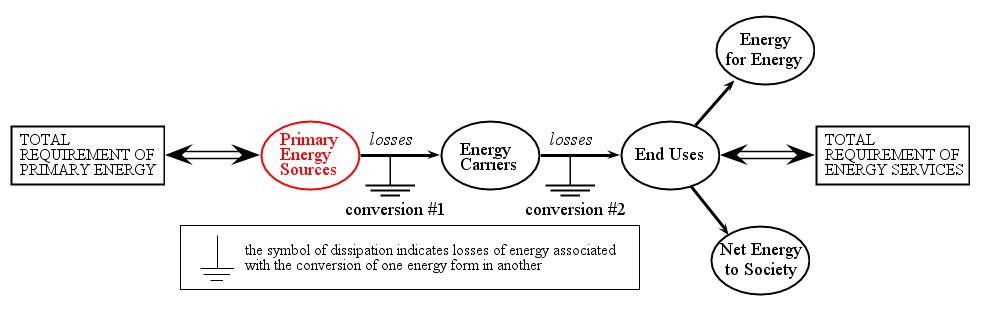
Primary energy sources are transformed by the energy sector to generate energy carriers.

Primary energy sources are transformed in energy conversion processes to more convenient forms of energy that can directly be used by society, such as electrical energy, refined fuels, or synthetic fuels such as hydrogen fuel. In the field of energetics, these forms are called energy carriers and correspond to the concept of "secondary energy" in energy statistics.

=== Conversion to energy carriers (or secondary energy) ===
Energy carriers are energy forms which have been transformed from primary energy sources. Electricity is one of the most common energy carriers, being transformed from various primary energy sources such as coal, oil, natural gas, and wind. Electricity is particularly useful since it has low entropy (is highly ordered) and so can be converted into other forms of energy very efficiently. District heating is another example of secondary energy.

According to the laws of thermodynamics, primary energy sources cannot be produced. They must be available to society to enable the production of energy carriers.

Conversion efficiency varies. For thermal energy, electricity and mechanical energy production is limited by Carnot's theorem, and generates a lot of waste heat. Other non-thermal conversions can be more efficient. For example, while wind turbines do not capture all of the wind's energy, they have a high conversion efficiency and generate very little waste heat since wind energy is low entropy. In principle solar photovoltaic conversions could be very efficient, but current conversion can only be done well for narrow ranges of wavelength, whereas solar thermal is also subject to Carnot efficiency limits. Hydroelectric power is also very ordered, and converted very efficiently. The amount of usable energy is the exergy of a system.

=== Site and source energy ===
Site energy is the term used in North America for the amount of end-use energy of all forms consumed at a specified location. This can be a mix of primary energy (such as natural gas burned at the site) and secondary energy (such as electricity). Site energy is measured at the campus, building, or sub-building level and is the basis for energy charges on utility bills.

Source energy, in contrast, is the term used in North America for the amount of primary energy consumed in order to provide a facility's site energy. It is always greater than the site energy, as it includes all site energy and adds to it the energy lost during transmission, delivery, and conversion. While source or primary energy provides a more complete picture of energy consumption, it cannot be measured directly and must be calculated using conversion factors from site energy measurements. For electricity, a typical value is three units of source energy for one unit of site energy. However, this can vary considerably depending on factors such as the primary energy source or fuel type, the type of power plant, and the transmission infrastructure. One full set of conversion factors is available as technical reference from Energy STAR.

Either site or source energy can be an appropriate metric when comparing or analyzing energy use of different facilities. The U.S Energy Information Administration, for example, uses primary (source) energy for its energy overviews but site energy for its Commercial Building Energy Consumption Survey and Residential Building Energy Consumption Survey. The US Environmental Protection Agency's Energy STAR program recommends using source energy, and the US Department of Energy uses site energy in its definition of a zero net energy building.

== Conversion factor conventions ==
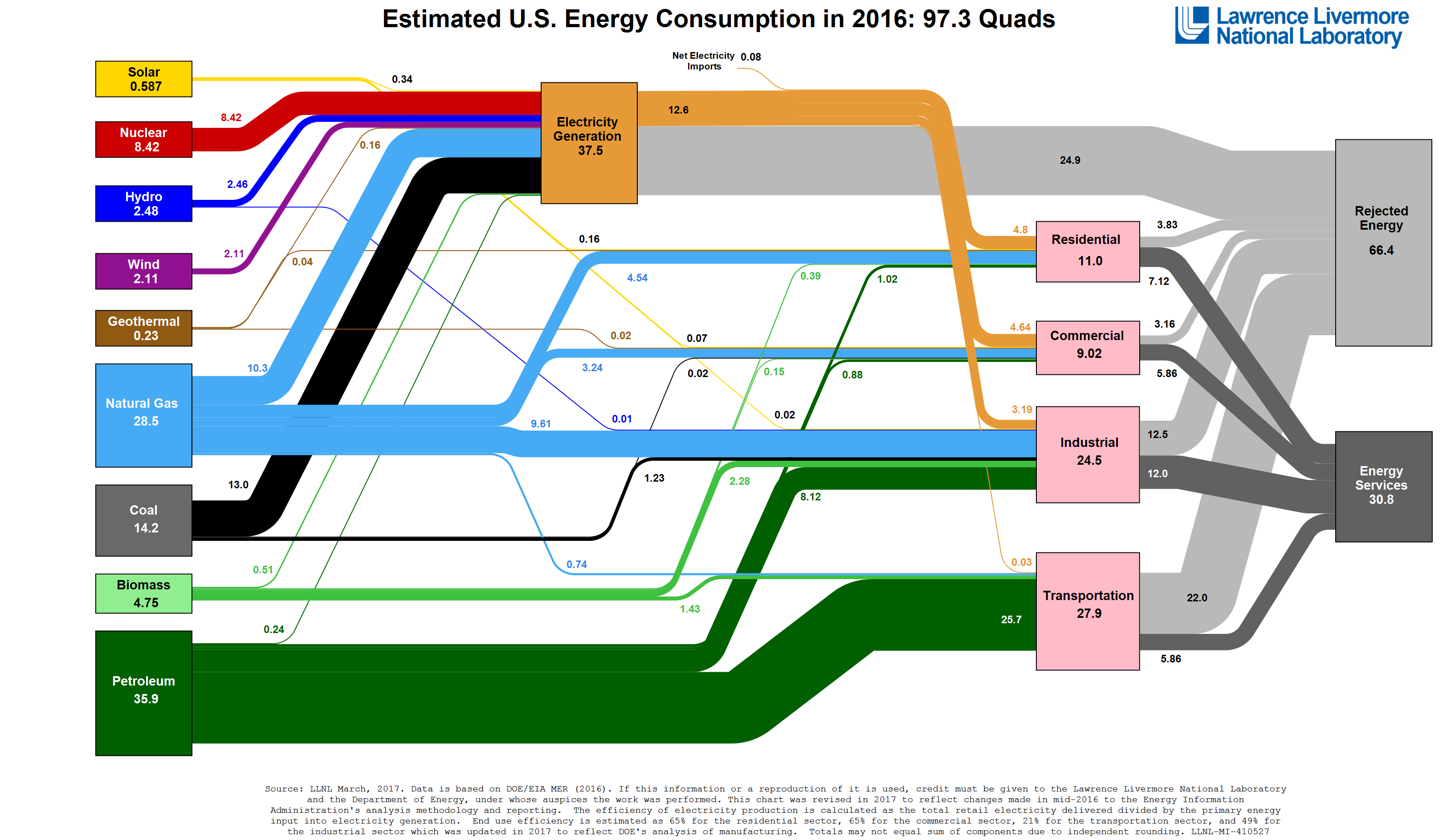
Sankey diagram for the United States 2016 shows that 66.4% of primary energy ends up as waste heat

World total primary energy consumption by type in 2024 (substitution method)
1. Oil (31.8%)
2. Coal (26.4%)
3. Natural Gas (23.7%)
4. Hydro (renewables) (6.25%)
5. Nuclear (3.95%)
6. Wind (renewables) (3.52%)
7. Solar (renewables) (2.96%)
8. Others (renewables) (1.42%)

Where primary energy is used to describe fossil fuels, the embodied energy of the fuel is available as thermal energy and around two thirds is typically lost in conversion to electrical or mechanical energy. There are very much less significant conversion losses when hydroelectricity, wind and solar power produce electricity, but today's UN conventions on energy statistics counts the electricity made from hydroelectricity, wind, solar and nuclear as the primary energy itself for these sources. One consequence of employing primary energy as an energy metric is that the contribution of these sources energy is under reported compared to fossil energy sources, and there is hence an international debate on how to count energy from non-thermal renewables, with many estimates having them undercounted by a factor of about two to three. The false notion that all primary energy from thermal fossil fuel sources has to be replaced by an equivalent amount of non-thermal renewables (which is not necessary as conversion losses do not need to be replaced) has been termed the "primary energy fallacy".

One method that is used to better account for this is called the substitution method. In this technique the electrical energy produced by these sources is divided by the average energy efficiency of fossil fuel electrical sources. This gives the primary energy that would have been needed if only fossil fuels were employed.

== See also ==
- Energy industry
- Energy development
- Energy mix
- Energy system
- List of countries by total primary energy consumption and production
