= Weyant =

Weyant is a surname. Notable people with the surname include:

- Anna Weyant (born 1995), American painter
- Carl Weyant (born 1983), American actor, writer, producer, model, and musician
- Chuck Weyant (1923–2017), American racecar driver
- Emma Weyant (born 2001), American swimmer
- John Weyant (born 1947), American academic
