= Energy Modeling Forum =

- Abbreviation: EMF
- Formation: 1976 (50 years ago)
- Founded at: Stanford University, California, USA
- Purpose: Scientific cooperation
- Official language: English
- Director: John Weyant
- Website: emf.stanford.edu

The Energy Modeling Forum (EMF) is a structured forum for discussing important issues related to energy and the environment. The EMF was established in 1976 at Stanford University. The EMF works through a series of ad hoc working groups, each focusing on specific corporate or policy decisions. The EMF provides a non-partisan platform that ensures objective consideration of opposing views. Participation is by invitation only.

Since the late 1990s, the EMF has made contributions to the economics of climate change, as reflected in the reports of the Intergovernmental Panel on Climate Change (IPCC) and in the field of integrated assessment modeling more generally.

John Weyant is the current director of the EMF. Other members of the EMF include Hillard Huntington, James Sweeney, and Frank Wolak.

== Ethos ==
The EMF was convened in 1976 over concerns that the insights that large-scale energy models could provide policymakers were being overshadowed by the "plethora of detailed quantitative results" being disseminated and discussed. As a result, the EMF sought to bring energy modelers together to provide a proper context for their work. Indeed, the EMF was "formed to foster better communication between the builders and users of energy models in energy planning and policy analysis".

The EMF periodically establishes ad hoc working groups to conduct studies on selected energy topics. A working group then identifies relevant existing models and sets a series of tests to illuminate the basic structure and behavior of each model. Results are then compared, and the strengths and weaknesses of each model are documented in a report, which, as of 1982 is freely available.

== List of EMF projects ==
Reports for most completed projects are available on the EMF website. However, reports since 2006 occasionally been published exclusively in special editions of paywalled academic journals instead.

EMF projects
Project	Reported	Description
Completed projects
EMF 01	1977	Energy and the economy
EMF 02	1978	Coal in transition: 1980–2000
EMF 03	1979	Electric load forecasting: probing the issue with models
EMF 04	1980	Aggregate elasticity of energy demand
EMF 05	1982	US oil and gas supply
EMF 06	1981	World oil
EMF 07	1986	Macroeconomic impacts of energy shocks
EMF 08	1987	Industrial energy demand, conservation, and interfuel substitution
EMF 09	1989	North American natural gas markets
EMF 10	1991	Electricity markets and planning
EMF 11	1992	International oil supplies and demands
EMF 12	1993	Controlling global carbon emissions: costs and policy options
EMF 13	1996	Markets for energy efficiency
EMF 14	—	Integrated assessment of climate change
EMF 15	1998	A competitive electricity industry
EMF 16	1999	The costs of the Kyoto Protocol
EMF 17	—	Prices and emissions in a restructured electricity market
EMF 18	—	International trade dimensions of climate policies
EMF 19	2002	Climate change: technology strategies and international trade
EMF 20	2003	Natural gas, fuel diversity, and North American energy markets
EMF 21	2008	Multi-gas mitigation and climate change
EMF 22	2010	Climate change control scenarios
EMF 23	2009	World natural gas markets and trade
EMF 24	2014	US technology and climate policy strategies
EMF 25	2011	Energy efficiency and climate change mitigation
EMF 26	2013	Emissions and market implications of new natural gas supplies
EMF 27	2014	Global technology and climate policy strategies
EMF 28	2013	The effects of technology choices on EU climate policy
EMF 29	2012	The role of border carbon adjustment in unilateral climate policy
Current projects (as of late-2016)
EMF 30		Short-lived climate forcers and air quality
EMF 31		North American natural gas markets in transition
EMF 32		US GHG and revenue recycling scenarios
EMF 33		Bio-energy and land use
The reported year is that of the last revision.; A dash indicates that no report is available.

== See also ==
- Open Energy Modelling Initiative – an open source energy modeling initiative centered on Europe
