= Energy modeling =

Process of building computer models of energy systems in order to analyze them

Energy modeling or energy system modeling is the process of building computer models of energy systems in order to analyze them. Such models often employ scenario analysis to investigate different assumptions about the technical and economic conditions at play. Outputs may include the system feasibility, greenhouse gas emissions, cumulative financial costs, natural resource use, and energy efficiency of the system under investigation. A wide range of techniques are employed, ranging from broadly economic to broadly engineering. Mathematical optimization is often used to determine the least-cost in some sense. Models can be international, regional, national, municipal, or stand-alone in scope. Governments maintain national energy models for energy policy development.

Energy models are usually intended to contribute variously to system operations, engineering design, or energy policy development. This page concentrates on policy models. Individual building energy simulations are explicitly excluded, although they too are sometimes called energy models. IPCC-style integrated assessment models, which also contain a representation of the world energy system and are used to examine global transformation pathways through to 2050 or 2100 are not considered here in detail.

Energy modeling has increased in importance as the need for climate change mitigation has grown in importance. The energy supply sector is the largest contributor to global greenhouse gas emissions. The IPCC reports that climate change mitigation will require a fundamental transformation of the energy supply system, including the substitution of unabated (not captured by CCS) fossil fuel conversion technologies by low-GHG alternatives.

== Model types ==
A wide variety of model types are in use. This section attempts to categorize the key types and their usage. The divisions provided are not hard and fast and mixed-paradigm models exist. In addition, the results from more general models can be used to inform the specification of more detailed models, and vice versa, thereby creating a hierarchy of models. Models may, in general, need to capture "complex dynamics such as:

- energy system operation
- technology stock turnover
- technology innovation
- firm and household behavior
- energy and non-energy capital investment and labor market adjustment dynamics leading to economic restructuring
- infrastructure deployment and urban planning"

Models may be limited in scope to the electricity sector or they may attempt to cover an energy system in its entirety (see below).

Most energy models are used for scenario analysis. A scenario is a coherent set of assumptions about a possible system. New scenarios are tested against a baseline scenario – normally business-as-usual (BAU) – and the differences in outcome noted.

The time horizon of the model is an important consideration. Single-year models – set in either the present or the future (say 2050) – assume a non-evolving capital structure and focus instead on the operational dynamics of the system. Single-year models normally embed considerable temporal (typically hourly resolution) and technical detail (such as individual generation plant and transmissions lines). Long-range models – cast over one or more decades (from the present until say 2050) – attempt to encapsulate the structural evolution of the system and are used to investigate capacity expansion and energy system transition issues.

Models often use mathematical optimization to solve for redundancy in the specification of the system. Some of the techniques used derive from operations research. Most rely on linear programming (including mixed-integer programming), although some use nonlinear programming. Solvers may use classical or genetic optimization, such as CMA-ES. Models may be recursive-dynamic, solving sequentially for each time interval, and thus evolving through time. Or they may be framed as a single forward-looking intertemporal problem, and thereby assume perfect foresight. Single-year engineering-based models usually attempt to minimize the short-run financial cost, while single-year market-based models use optimization to determine market clearing. Long-range models, usually spanning decades, attempt to minimize both the short and long-run costs as a single intertemporal problem.

The demand-side (or end-user domain) has historically received relatively scant attention, often modeled by just a simple demand curve. End-user energy demand curves, in the short-run at least, are normally found to be highly inelastic.

As intermittent energy sources and energy demand management grow in importance, models have needed to adopt an hourly temporal resolution in order to better capture their real-time dynamics. Long-range models are often limited to calculations at yearly intervals, based on typical day profiles, and are hence less suited to systems with significant variable renewable energy. Day-ahead dispatching optimization is used to aid in the planning of systems with a significant portion of intermittent energy production in which uncertainty around future energy predictions is accounted for using stochastic optimization.

Implementing languages include GAMS, MathProg, MATLAB, Mathematica, Python, Pyomo, R, Fortran, Java, C, C++, and Vensim. Occasionally spreadsheets are used.

As noted, IPCC-style integrated models (also known as integrated assessment models or IAM) are not considered here in any detail. Integrated models combine simplified sub-models of the world economy, agriculture and land-use, and the global climate system in addition to the world energy system. Examples include GCAM, MESSAGE, and REMIND.

Published surveys on energy system modeling have focused on techniques, general classification, an overview, decentralized planning, modeling methods, renewables integration, energy efficiency policies, electric vehicle integration, international development, and the use of layered models to support climate protection policy. Deep Decarbonization Pathways Project researchers have also analyzed model typologies. A 2014 paper outlines the modeling challenges ahead as energy systems become more complex and human and social factors become increasingly relevant.

=== Electricity sector models ===
Electricity sector models are used to model electricity systems. The scope may be national or regional, depending on circumstances. For instance, given the presence of national interconnectors, the western European electricity system may be modeled in its entirety.

Engineering-based models usually contain a good characterization of the technologies involved, including the high-voltage AC transmission grid where appropriate. Some models (for instance, models for Germany) may assume a single common bus or "copper plate" where the grid is strong. The demand-side in electricity sector models is typically represented by a fixed load profile.

Market-based models, in addition, represent the prevailing electricity market, which may include nodal pricing.

Game theory and agent-based models are used to capture and study strategic behavior within electricity markets.

=== Energy system models ===
In addition to the electricity sector, energy system models include the heat, gas, mobility, and other sectors as appropriate. Energy system models are often national in scope, but may be municipal or international.

So-called top-down models are broadly economic in nature and based on either partial equilibrium or general equilibrium. General equilibrium models represent a specialized activity and require dedicated algorithms. Partial equilibrium models are more common.

So-called bottom-up models capture the engineering well and often rely on techniques from operations research. Individual plants are characterized by their efficiency curves (also known as input/output relations), nameplate capacities, investment costs (capex), and operating costs (opex). Some models allow for these parameters to depend on external conditions, such as ambient temperature.

Producing hybrid top-down/bottom-up models to capture both the economics and the engineering has proved challenging.

== Energy models ==
This section briefly describes some of the major models in use, in a summary table followed by prose descriptions. These models are typically licensed by private companies or are open-source. Additional information about the models can be found in the much more detailed wiki editable table at this link: Electric Sector Models.

Model	Model type	Geographic region	Availability	Sectors included	Special features	Reference
Aurora	Production Cost / Capacity Expansion	US	Proprietary	Power		
Dayzer	Production Cost	US and Canada (Regional)	Commercial	Power		
E4ST (Engineering, Economic, and Environmental Electricity Simulation Tool)	Capacity Expansion / Production Cost	US, Canada, northern Baja	Open Source	Power (detailed), gas (zonal), air quality (detailed)	Detailed grid, physics-based flows, geographic detail, integrated air quality modeling, comprehensive benefit-cost analysis, user-modifiable	
EnCompass (Yes Energy)	Production Cost / Capacity Expansion	US	Commercial	Power		
Energy Policy Simulator	Capacity Expansion	Global	Open to Public	Power		
GenX	Production Cost	US	Open Source	Power		
GridPath	Production Cost	US	Open Source	Power		
Haiku	Capacity Expansion / Production Cost	US (regional)	Commercial	Power	Emphasis on policy analysis	
Hitachi Gridview	Production Cost	US	Commercial	Power		
Integrated Planning Model	Capacity Expansion	US	Proprietary	Power	Used by USEPA	
Multi-Area Production Simulation (MAPS)	Capacity Expansion	US	Proprietary	Power		
Markal	Production Cost	US	Open Source	Power		
NEMS	Production Cost	US	Government	Power	Used by USDOE	
OSeMOSYS	Capacity Expansion	Global	Open Source	Power		
PlanOS	Production Cost	Global	Commercial			
Plexos	Production Cost	US (regional)	Proprietary	Power		
Power System Optimizer (Polaris)	Production Cost	US	Commercial	Power		
PROMOD	Production Cost	US	Proprietary	Power		
PyPSA	Capacity Expansion	US and Europe	Open Source	Power		
REPEAT	Capacity Expansion	US	Proprietary	Power		
Resource Planning Model - RPM	Capacity Expansion	US	Open Source	Power		
Switch	Production Cost	US	Open Source	Power		
TEMOA	Capacity Expansion	Global	Open Source	Power		
TIMES	Capacity Expansion	US	Open to Public	Power		
US-REGEN	Capacity Expansion	US	Open Source	Power		
Wis:DOM	Capacity Expansion	US	Commercial	Power		

=== Aurora ===
Aurora is a model developed by Energy Exemplar to analyze long-term capacity expansion and evaluate the impact of battery storage on overall system performance. The model has several features for analyzing power market risks, price forecasting, and fuel price trending. The model includes some environmental factors by including carbon pricing and emission controls costs.

=== Dayzer ===
Dayzer focuses on short term modeling. This includes a day-ahead locational market clearing price analyzer developed by Cambridge Energy Solutions. This model is designed to assists electricity market participants in understanding and managing transmission congestion costs in competitive electricity markets.

=== E4ST ===
E4ST (short for Engineering, Economic, and Environmental Electricity Simulation Tool) has been developed by researchers at Resources for the Future (RFF), Cornell University, and Arizona State University (ASU). The modeling software is designed as an engineering, economic, and environmental electricity generation simulation tool. The model is a medium term model that uses optimization algorithms to determine cost minimization. The model can be used to evaluate how the power sector will respond to changes in environmental and non-environmental policies and regulations, input costs, transmission investments, generation investments, and other factors. It determines operation, entry and exit of generators, prices including capacity/scarcity prices, all of the elements of social surplus (a measure of total net benefits), and other outcomes.

=== EnCompass (Yes Energy) ===
Encompass is a comprehensive and integrated power forecasting and simulation software that helps utilities and market participants manage risk, decarbonization, and reliability. The model optimizes power supply decisions from short-term scheduling to long-term planning using multi-scenario forecasts and nodal market simulation capabilities. This model supports cost analysis and includes some environmental considerations. EnCompass has explicit modeling capabilities for emission compliance based on current policies.

=== Energy Policy Simulator (EPS) ===
The Energy Policy Simulator is an economy-wide policy impact model that analyzes how energy and environmental policies influence emissions, energy use, cash flows, costs, and health. It provides a transparent, educational tool for comparing policy scenarios and supporting informed stakeholder decisions. The model simulates climate and energy policies—CO₂ pricing, emission caps, greenhouse gas volume, pollutant emissions, and related environmental and health metrics.

=== GenX ===
GenX is an open source modeling software developed by researchers at MIT and Princeton that supports modeling of the electricity market and includes a decarbonization model that represents least-cost electricity generation with flexibility constraints. The model supports research and decision-making by exploring how policies, technologies, and market structures shape cost-effective, reliable pathways for power sector decarbonization.

=== Haiku ===
Haiku is an energy modeling software owned by Resources of the Future (RFF). It is a regional electricity market simulation model that accounts for capacity planning, investment, and retirements. The model focuses on short term planning and accounts for system operations across seasons and times of day. The model represents fuel markets and interregional electricity trade within the United States.

=== Hitachi Gridview ===
The Hitachi Gridview model (formerly ABB Gridview) simulates operation of competitive electricity markets by enforcing engineering constraints in chronological sequence over time spans from a day to several years. The model helps energy producers identify optimal operating strategies and make informed short-term financial decisions that minimize system-wide costs. This model does not include any explicit environmental compliance or dedicated environmental modeling features.

=== Integrated Planning Model (IPM) ===
The Integrated Planning Model is a long-term optimization model for power market forecasting, capacity expansion, and analysis by environmental regulators. The model provides a comprehensive tool to study power markets and environmental policies under regulator constraints such as carbon dioxide caps and emissions trading programs. The model is practical for energy analysis within the United States. The model projects wholesale energy prices over multi-decade horizons and emphasizes long-term planning reserves.

=== LEAP ===
LEAP, the Low Emissions Analysis Platform (formerly known as the Long-range Energy Alternatives Planning System) is a software tool for energy policy analysis, air pollution abatement planning and climate change mitigation assessment.

LEAP was developed at the Stockholm Environment Institute's (SEI) US Center. LEAP can be used to examine city, statewide, national, and regional energy systems. LEAP is normally used for studies of between 20–50 years. Most of its calculations occur at yearly intervals. LEAP allows policy analysts to create and evaluate alternative scenarios and to compare their energy requirements, social costs and benefits, and environmental impacts. As of June 2021, LEAP has over 6000 users in 200 countries and territories

=== MARKAL/TIMES ===
MARKAL (MARKet ALlocation) is an integrated energy systems modeling platform, used to analyze energy, economic, and environmental issues at the global, national, and municipal level over time-frames of up to several decades. MARKAL can be used to quantify the impacts of policy options on technology development and natural resource depletion. The software was developed by the Energy Technology Systems Analysis Programme (ETSAP) of the International Energy Agency (IEA) over a period of almost two decades.

TIMES (The Integrated MARKAL-EFOM System) is an evolution of MARKAL – both energy models have many similarities. TIMES succeeded MARKAL in 2008. Both models are technology explicit, dynamic partial equilibrium models of energy markets. In both cases, the equilibrium is determined by maximizing the total consumer and producer surplus via linear programming. Both MARKAL and TIMES are written in GAMS.

The TIMES model generator was also developed under the Energy Technology Systems Analysis Program (ETSAP). TIMES combines two different, but complementary, systematic approaches to modeling energy – a technical engineering approach and an economic approach. TIMES is a technology rich, bottom-up model generator, which uses linear programming to produce a least-cost energy system, optimized according to a number of user-specified constraints, over the medium to long-term. It is used for "the exploration of possible energy futures based on contrasted scenarios".

As of 2015, the MARKAL and TIMES model generators are in use in 177 institutions spread over 70 countries.

=== Multi-Area Production Simulation (MAPS) ===
General Electric's MAPS (Multi-Area Production Simulation) is a production simulation model used by various Regional Transmission Organizations and Independent System Operators in the United States to plan for the economic impact of proposed electric transmission and generation facilities in FERC-regulated electric wholesale markets. Portions of the model may also be used for the commitment and dispatch phase (updated on 5 minute intervals) in operation of wholesale electric markets for RTO and ISO regions. ABB's PROMOD is a similar software package. These ISO and RTO regions also utilize a GE software package called MARS (Multi-Area Reliability Simulation) to ensure the power system meets reliability criteria (a loss of load expectation (LOLE) of no greater than 0.1 days per year). Further, a GE software package called PSLF (Positive Sequence Load Flow) and a Siemens software package called PSSE (Power System Simulation for Engineering) analyzes load flow on the power system for short-circuits and stability during preliminary planning studies by RTOs and ISOs.

=== NEMS ===
NEMS (National Energy Modeling System) is a long-standing United States government policy model, run by the Department of Energy (DOE). NEMS computes equilibrium fuel prices and quantities for the US energy sector. To do so, the software iteratively solves a sequence of linear programs and nonlinear equations. NEMS has been used to explicitly model the demand-side, in particular to determine consumer technology choices in the residential and commercial building sectors. The model includes an emissions policy module that allows it to analyze regulator compliance, calculate carbon dioxide emissions, and identify policy impacts.

NEMS is used to produce the Annual Energy Outlook each year – for instance in 2015.

=== OSeMOSYS ===
The Open Source Energy Modeling System (OSeMOSYS) is a long-run integrated assessment and energy planning model designed to be simple and transparent. The model supports long-term energy system decarbonization. OSeMOSYS is a free, open-source energy system model for national planning with low computational requirements and a relatively small learning curve.

=== Plexos ===
The Plexos model by Energy Exemplar is a medium term capacity expansion and analysis model. It focuses on the eastern United States and provides nodal analysis to identify operation reserves, and reserve margins. The model includes environmental regulation costs by including plant level sulfur dioxide and nitrogen monoxide pricing.

=== Power Systems Optimizer (Polaris) ===
The Polaris model is an industrial-grade engine for power system optimization that addresses unit commitment, economic dispatch, resource adequacy, and co-optimized gas–electric operations. This model includes production cost market simulator that optimizes energy flows, commitment, and resource deployment and simulates energy storage based on efficiency. Polaris also improves environmental outcomes via more efficient, low-carbon dispatch but lacks explicit carbon-pricing or emissions-cap modeling.

=== PROMOD ===
PROMOD is an energy modeling service developed by Hitachi Energy for the model generation of the transmission power market. It is a short term product cost model that performs hourly market simulations, congestion analysis, and financial transmission rights valuations. The model focuses on modeling market dynamics and locational marginal prices to inform decision-making in deregulated electricity markets. The model incorporates environmental regulations via emissions costs and carbon prices, but does not optimize compliance strategies.

=== PyPSA ===
PyPSA is an open source modeling system that focuses on electricity networks with detailed power flow modeling and optional multi-sector coupling, such as heat and industry. The model optimizes modern energy systems including generation, storage, sector coupling, and transmission to analyze renewable integration.

=== REPEAT ===
REPEAT stands for Rapid Energy Policy Evaluation and Analysis Toolkit and is a policy assessment energy model. The model has a broad framework that allows for economy wide coverage and a RIO component for power sector capacity expansion. The model evaluates environmental and economic impacts on federal energy and climate policies. It allows for spatial emissions modeling and renewable energy generation integration.

=== Resource Planning Model (RPM) ===
The Resource Planning Model (RPM) is owned by the National Renewable Energy Laboratory. This model focuses on capacity expansion and optimizes generation, transmission, and energy storage investments to meet long-term energy policy goals. The model imposes policy constraints such as renewable portfolio standards and emission requirements to assess compliance and environmental impacts.

=== Switch ===
Switch is an open source platform that focuses on long-term electric power planning. The model co-optimizes generation, storage, and transmission to meet electricity demand at lowest cost. It is used to plan least-cost power system development while achieving specified policy goals.

=== TEMOA ===
TEMOA stands for the Tools for Energy Model Optimization and Analysis. The TEMOA power model is an open source long-term energy system optimization model. This model is designed for long-term planning and is used to explore decarbonization pathways, carbon pricing, renewable energy targets, and technology cost reductions. It also has the capability to analyze future energy systems under different public policy scenarios. The model can be used to explore decarbonization policy pathways since it includes carbon prices, emission caps, and renewable energy mandates.

=== US-REGEN ===
The US-REGEN model was developed by the Electric Power Research Institute. It is an open-source program that links detailed electric sector capacity planning and fuels supply system with a detailed consumer choice model of end-use services and energy demands. This model serves as EPRI's US Regional Economy, Greenhouse Gas, and Energy model for energy modeling and technology analysis.

== Criticisms ==
Public policy energy models have been criticized for being insufficiently transparent. The source code and data sets should at least be available for peer review, if not explicitly published. To improve transparency and public acceptance, some models are undertaken as open-source software projects, often developing a diverse community as they proceed. OSeMOSYS is an example of such a model. The Open Energy Outlook is an open community that has produced a long-term outlook of the US energy system using the open-source TEMOA model.

== See also ==
- Climate change mitigation – actions to limit long-term climate change
- Climate change mitigation scenarios – possible futures in which global warming is reduced by deliberate actions
- Economic model
- Energy system – the interpretation of the energy sector in system terms
- Energy Modeling Forum – a Stanford University-based modeling forum
- Open Energy Modelling Initiative – an open source energy modeling initiative, centered on Europe
- Open energy system databases – database projects which collect, clean, and republish energy-related datasets
- Open energy system models – a review of energy system models that are also open source
- Power system simulation
- POLES (Prospective Outlook on Long-term Energy Systems) – an energy sector world simulation mode
