= Insular energy system =

An insular energy system or isolated energy system is defined by a country’s inability, due to smallness and/or remoteness, to interconnect with other electricity generators and consumers through a wider transmission grid outside its national borders. As a result, the country cannot take advantage of the more efficient neighboring electricity markets. This type of energy system is typically detected in small islands or in mainland countries where the costs for constructing infrastructure for power transmission purposes are prohibitively high, or in cases where a country may be isolated due to political issues.

== Energy mix ==
The energy mix of insular energy systems is dominated by diesel and heavy fuel oil. The vast amounts of imported fossil fuel necessary to fulfil the energy needs of these systems create instability in the economy as well as the security of the countries. Additionally, the domination of fossil-fueled energy generation is strongly supported by several other factors, including the inefficiency of indigenous energy resources, the limited infrastructure of energy delivery, the lack of storage, and the flexibility of the power generators to meet seasonal needs. Insular energy systems typically have only a few independent power producers and a limited range of power generation technologies. Furthermore, there is lack of attractive support schemes or incentives for the progression of the system from fossil fuels to renewable and low-carbon energy sources. At the same time, their efforts to meet international or European obligations often fail and are normally also costly.

== Disadvantages ==
A number of issues make the energy generation of insular systems extremely expensive and less secure. First, the great dependency of insular energy systems on imported energy sources for electricity generation and their associated high transportation and shipping costs are reflected in the electricity pricing. Additionally, the small sizes of these systems limit not only the production and consumption capacities, but also the establishment and growth of significant internal markets. Also, the dominance of a sole public or private energy producer means that a single stakeholder is fully responsible for generating, transmitting and distributing electricity and in control of the associated investment decisions, programmes, and tariff setting. The reduction of GHG emissions is another great challenge for insular energy systems given that most of their electricity production is based on fossil fuels.

== Classification of systems ==
Insular energy systems can be divided into three categories according to their installed power capacity and location:

- Category A: Islands of up to 100 MW of installed capacity

The countries found in this category have limited energy demand and large distance from the mainland. Only a limited number of these countries utilize renewable energy sources, contributing up to 5% of the energy mix.

- Category B: Islands from 100 MW up to 15GW of installed capacity

The majority of the islands in this category exploit, to a small or large extent, renewable energy sources due to their larger consumption demand and higher GDPs.

- Category C: Mainland countries with no grid interconnection

The GDP of the majority of countries found in this category is very low. The political situation in these countries limits the investment in electricity infrastructure, as health and military issues are typically more alarming and urgent to resolve. Conversely, this category also includes mainland nations that do not export or import electricity to their neighbours and are as also major petroleum exporting countries including Qatar, UAE and Saudi Arabia. It is evident that the abundance of fossil fuels found in these countries has not alarmed them to turn to renewable energy resources.

== Transition to smart energy systems ==
The transition to smart systems can be achieved through a variety of measures and policies including:

- the promotion of energy efficiency measures;
- the establishment of smart grids;
- the utilization of renewable energy technologies;
- the installation of large storage systems.

However, every action should preliminarily take into consideration the local conditions of the energy system, as well as the economic feasibility. Exploiting renewable energy sources can contribute significantly in reducing the level of energy imports of insular energy systems with positive impacts for the balance of trade and security of supply. Yet, there are obstacles that need to be overcome before renewable energy generation penetrates the insular energy systems. Renewable energy technologies are less reliable than conventional technologies due to the fact that the energy production is variable and weather dependent and thus additional technologies such as energy storage are required. Monopolistic power sectors also prevent the development of smaller scale renewable electricity generation that would be more efficient and cost-competitive and put conventional technologies in a preferential position due to the earlier profit resulting from the lower capital costs.
