= Energy balance (energy economics) =

Energy balance, in terms of energy economics, is concerned with all processes within an organization that have a reference to energy. It derives from the ecobalance and has the ambition to analyze and verify the emergence, transformation and use of energy resources in an organization in detail. Energy balances serve as a major statistical data base for energy policy and energy management decisions. They contain important information such as the amount and composition of energy consumption, its changes or the transformation of energy.

Countries and NGOs publish energy balances, for instance World Energy Balances published by the International Energy Agency IEA.

== Approach ==
The basic idea of a balance is that nothing can get lost or annihilated - this fits to the first law of thermodynamics, which assigns energy this property. But energy splits up during usage and its output does not have the same potential for the physical performance as before.

For this reason it is important to distinguish between input and output of energy usage. The input side can easily be measured with the help of the meter readings. But on the output side there may be effects that are difficulty predictable, such as heat, dust or noise. In this context it is very interesting, how much of the energy used has actually reached the intended use. Based on this calculation, improvement measures can be derived. A separation in energy sources and places of consumption is necessary. An Outline based on the cost centre of the organization is also possible.

== See also ==
- Energy system
- Worldwide energy supply
