= Energy system =

All components related to production, conversion, delivery, and use of energy

Physical components of a generic energy system supplying fuels and electricity (but not district heat) to end-users

An energy system is a system primarily designed to supply energy-services to end-users. The intent behind energy systems is to minimise energy losses to a negligible level, as well as to ensure the efficient use of energy. The IPCC Fifth Assessment Report defines an energy system as "all components related to the production, conversion, delivery, and use of energy".

The first two definitions allow for demand-side measures, including daylighting, retrofitted building insulation, and passive solar building design, as well as socio-economic factors, such as aspects of energy demand management and remote work, while the third does not. Neither does the third account for the informal economy in traditional biomass that is significant in many developing countries.

The analysis of energy systems thus spans the disciplines of engineering and economics. Merging ideas from both areas to form a coherent description, particularly where macroeconomic dynamics are involved, is challenging.

The concept of an energy system is evolving as new regulations, technologies, and practices enter into service – for example, emissions trading, the development of smart grids, and the greater use of energy demand management, respectively.

== Treatment ==
From a structural perspective, an energy system is like any system and is made up of a set of interacting component parts, located within an environment. These components derive from ideas found in engineering and economics. Taking a process view, an energy system "consists of an integrated set of technical and economic activities operating within a complex societal framework". The identification of the components and behaviors of an energy system depends on the circumstances, the purpose of the analysis, and the questions under investigation. The concept of an energy system is therefore an abstraction which usually precedes some form of computer-based investigation, such as the construction and use of a suitable energy model.

Viewed in engineering terms, an energy system lends itself to representation as a flow network: the vertices map to engineering components like power stations and pipelines and the edges map to the interfaces between these components. This approach allows collections of similar or adjacent components to be aggregated and treated as one to simplify the model. Once described thus, flow network algorithms, such as minimum cost flow, may be applied. The components themselves can be treated as simple dynamical systems in their own right.

=== Economic modeling ===
Conversely, relatively pure economic modeling may adopt a sectoral approach with only limited engineering detail present. The sector and sub-sector categories published by the International Energy Agency are often used as a basis for this analysis. A 2009 study of the UK residential energy sector contrasts the use of the technology-rich Markal model with several UK sectoral housing stock models.

==== Data ====
International energy statistics are typically broken down by carrier, sector and sub-sector, and country. Energy carriers (aka energy products) are further classified as primary energy and secondary (or intermediate) energy and sometimes final (or end-use) energy. Published energy datasets are normally adjusted so that they are internally consistent, meaning that all energy stocks and flows must balance. The IEA regularly publishes energy statistics and energy balances with varying levels of detail and cost and also offers mid-term projections based on this data. The notion of an energy carrier, as used in energy economics, is distinct and different from the definition of energy used in physics.

=== Scopes ===
Energy systems can range in scope, from local, municipal, national, and regional, to global, depending on issues under investigation. Researchers may or may not include demand side measures within their definition of an energy system. The Intergovernmental Panel on Climate Change (IPCC) does so, for instance, but covers these measures in separate chapters on transport, buildings, industry, and agriculture. (Note: The IPCC chapter on agriculture is titled: Agriculture, forestry, and other land use (AFOLU).)

Household consumption and investment decisions may also be included within the ambit of an energy system. Such considerations are not common because consumer behavior is difficult to characterize, but the trend is to include human factors in models. Household decision-taking may be represented using techniques from bounded rationality and agent-based behavior. The American Association for the Advancement of Science (AAAS) specifically advocates that "more attention should be paid to incorporating behavioral considerations other than price- and income-driven behavior into economic models [of the energy system]".

== Energy-services ==
The concept of an energy-service is central, particularly when defining the purpose of an energy system:

It is important to realize that the use of energy is no end in itself but is always directed to satisfy human needs and desires. Energy services are the ends for which the energy system provides the means.

Energy-services can be defined as amenities that are either furnished through energy consumption or could have been thus supplied. More explicitly:

Demand should, where possible, be defined in terms of energy-service provision, as characterized by an appropriate intensity (Note: The term intensity refers to quantities which do not scale with component size. See intensive and extensive properties.) – for example, air temperature in the case of space-heating or lux levels for illuminance. This approach facilitates a much greater set of potential responses to the question of supply, including the use of energetically-passive techniques – for instance, retrofitted insulation and daylighting.

A consideration of energy-services per capita and how such services contribute to human welfare and individual quality of life is paramount to the debate on sustainable energy. People living in poor regions with low levels of energy-services consumption would clearly benefit from greater consumption, but the same is not generally true for those with high levels of consumption.

The notion of energy-services has given rise to energy-service companies (ESCo) who contract to provide energy-services to a client for an extended period. The ESCo is then free to choose the best means to do so, including investments in the thermal performance and HVAC equipment of the buildings in question.

== International standards ==
ISO 13600, ISO 13601, and ISO 13602 form a set of international standards covering technical energy systems (TES). Although withdrawn prior to 2016, these documents provide useful definitions and a framework for formalizing such systems. The standards depict an energy system broken down into supply and demand sectors, linked by the flow of tradable energy commodities (or energywares). Each sector has a set of inputs and outputs, some intentional and some harmful byproducts. Sectors may be further divided into subsectors, each fulfilling a dedicated purpose. The demand sector is ultimately present to supply energyware-based services to consumers (see energy-services).

== Energy system redesign and transformation ==
Energy system design includes the redesigning of energy systems to ensure sustainability of the system and its dependents and for meeting requirements of the Paris Agreement for climate change mitigation. Researchers are designing energy systems models and transformational pathways for renewable energy transitions towards 100% renewable energy, often in the form of peer-reviewed text documents created once by small teams of scientists and published in a journal.

Considerations include the system's intermittency management, air pollution, various risks (such as for human safety, environmental risks, cost risks and feasibility risks), stability for prevention of power outages (including grid dependence or grid-design), resource requirements (including water and rare minerals and recyclability of components), technology/development requirements, costs, feasibility, other affected systems (such as land-use that affects food systems), carbon emissions, available energy quantity and transition-concerning factors (including costs, labor-related issues and speed of deployment).

Energy system design can also consider energy consumption, such as in terms of absolute energy demand, waste and consumption reduction (e.g. via reduced energy-use, increased efficiency and flexible timing), process efficiency enhancement and waste heat recovery. A study noted significant potential for a type of energy systems modelling to "move beyond single disciplinary approaches towards a sophisticated integrated perspective".

== See also ==
- Control volume – a concept from mechanics and thermodynamics
- Electric power system – a network of electrical components used to generate, transfer, and use electric power
- Energy development – the effort to provide societies with sufficient energy under the reduced social and environmental impact
- Energy modeling – the process of building computer models of energy systems
- Energy industry – the supply-side of the energy sector
- Insular energy system - where an energy system is isolated from other nearby energy systems
- Mathematical model – the representation of a system using mathematics and often solved using computers
- Object-oriented programming – a computer programming paradigm suited to the representation of energy systems as networks
- Network science – the study of complex networks
- Open energy system databases – database projects which collect, clean, and republish energy-related datasets
- Open energy system models – a review of energy system models that are also open source
- Sankey diagram – used to show energy flows through a system
