= Open Energy Modelling Initiative =

- Abbreviation: openmod
- Formation: September 2014 (12 years ago) (Note: The first workshop was held on 18–19 September 2014 and the first posting to the openmod mailing list occurred on 4 October 2014.)
- Type: Internet-based with periodic workshops
- Official language: English
- Website: www.openmod-initiative.org

The Open Energy Modelling Initiative (openmod) is a grassroots community of energy system modellers from universities and research institutes across Europe and elsewhere. The initiative promotes the use of open-source software and open data in energy modelling for research and policy advice. The Open Energy Modelling Initiative documents a variety of open-source energy models and addresses practical and conceptual issues regarding their development and application. The initiative runs an email list, an internet forum, and a wiki and hosts occasional academic workshops. A statement of aims is available.

== Context ==
The application of open-source development to energy modelling dates back to around 2003. This section provides some background for the growing interest in open methods.

=== Growth in open energy modelling ===
Just two active open energy modelling projects were cited in a 2011 paper: OSeMOSYS and TEMOA. Balmorel was also public at that time, having been made available on a website in 2001. (Note: NEMO was also under development in 2011 but it is unclear whether its codebase was public at that point.) As of October 2021, the Open Energy Platform lists 17 open energy frameworks and about 50 open energy models.

=== Academic literature ===
This 2012 paper presents the case for using "open, publicly accessible software and data as well as crowdsourcing techniques to develop robust energy analysis tools". The paper claims that these techniques can produce high-quality results and are particularly relevant for developing countries.

There is an increasing call for the energy models and datasets used for energy policy analysis and advice to be made public in the interests of transparency and quality. A 2010 paper concerning energy efficiency modelling argues that "an open peer review process can greatly support model verification and validation, which are essential for model development". One 2012 study argues that the source code and datasets used in such models should be placed under publicly accessible version control to enable third-parties to run and check specific models. Another 2014 study argues that the public trust needed to underpin a rapid transition in energy systems can only be built through the use of transparent open-source energy models. The UK TIMES project (UKTM) is open source, according to a 2014 presentation, because "energy modelling must be replicable and verifiable to be considered part of the scientific process" and because this fits with the "drive towards clarity and quality assurance in the provision of policy insights". In 2016, the Deep Decarbonization Pathways Project (DDPP) is seeking to improve its modelling methodologies, a key motivation being "the intertwined goals of transparency, communicability and policy credibility." A 2016 paper argues that model-based energy scenario studies, wishing to influence decision-makers in government and industry, must become more comprehensible and more transparent. To these ends, the paper provides a checklist of transparency criteria that should be completed by modellers. The authors note however that they "consider open source approaches to be an extreme case of transparency that does not automatically facilitate the comprehensibility of studies for policy advice." An editorial from 2016 opines that closed energy models providing public policy support "are inconsistent with the open access movement [and] publically [sic] funded research". A 2017 paper lists the benefits of open data and models and the reasons that many projects nonetheless remain closed. The paper makes a number of recommendations for projects wishing to transition to a more open approach. The authors also conclude that, in terms of openness, energy research has lagged behind other fields, most notably physics, biotechnology, and medicine. Moreover:

Given the importance of rapid global coordinated action on climate mitigation and the clear benefits of shared research efforts and transparently reproducible policy analysis, openness in energy research should not be for the sake of having some code or data available on a website, but as an initial step towards fundamentally better ways to both conduct our research and engage decision-makers with [our] models and the assumptions embedded within them.

A one-page opinion piece in Nature News from 2017 advances the case for using open energy data and modelling to build public trust in policy analysis. The article also argues that scientific journals have a responsibility to require that data and code be submitted alongside text for scrutiny, currently only Energy Economics makes this practice mandatory within the energy domain.

=== Copyright and open energy data ===
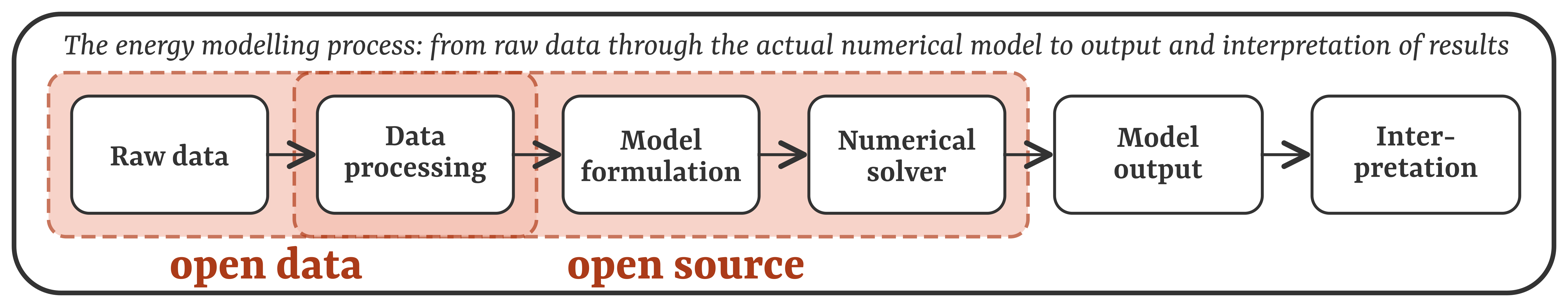
Diagram depicting an open analysis workflow prepared by Stefen Pfenninger for the first Open Energy Modelling Initiative meeting in Berlin, Germany held 18–19 September 2014

Issues surrounding copyright remain at the forefront with regard to open energy data. Most energy datasets are collated and published by official or semi-official sources, for example, national statistics offices, transmission system operators, and electricity market operators. The doctrine of open data requires that these datasets be available under free licences (such as CC BY 4.0) or be in the public domain. But most published energy datasets carry proprietary licences, limiting their reuse in numerical and statistical models, open or otherwise. Measures to enforce market transparency have not helped because the associated information is normally licensed to preclude downstream usage. Recent transparency measures include the 2013 European energy market transparency regulation 543/2013 and a 2016 amendment to the German Energy Industry Act to establish a nation energy information platform, slated to launch on 1 July 2017. Energy databases may also be protected under general database law, irrespective of the copyright status of the information they hold.

In December 2017, participants from the Open Energy Modelling Initiative and allied research communities made a written submission to the European Commission on the re-use of public sector information. The document provides a comprehensive account of the data issues faced by researchers engaged in open energy system modelling and energy market analysis and quoted extensively from a German legal opinion.

In May 2020, participants from the Open Energy Modelling Initiative made a further submission on the European strategy for data. In mid‑2021, participants made two written submissions on a proposed Data Act — legislative work-in-progress intended primarily to improve public interest business-to-government (B2G) information transfers within the European Economic Area (EEA). More specifically, the two Data Act submissions drew attention to restrictive but nonetheless compliant public disclosure reporting practices deployed by the European Energy Exchange (EEX).

=== Public policy support ===
In May 2016, the European Union announced that "all scientific articles in Europe must be freely accessible as of 2020". This is a step in the right direction, but the new policy makes no mention of open software and its importance to the scientific process. In August 2016, the United States government announced a new federal source code policy which mandates that at least 20% of custom source code developed by or for any agency of the federal government be released as open-source software (OSS). The US Department of Energy (DOE) is participating in the program. The project is hosted on a dedicated website and subject to a three-year pilot. Open-source campaigners are using the initiative to advocate that European governments adopt similar practices. In 2017 the Free Software Foundation Europe (FSFE) issued a position paper calling for free software and open standards to be central to European science funding, including the flagship EU program Horizon 2020. The position paper focuses on open data and open data processing and the question of open modelling is not traversed per se.

=== Adoption by regulators and industry generally ===
A trend evident by 2023 is the adoption of regulators within the European Union and North America. Fairley (2023), writing in the IEEE Spectrum publication, provides an overview. And as one example, the Canada Energy Regulator is using the PyPSA framework for systems analysis.

== Workshops ==
The Open Energy Modelling Initiative participants take turns to host regular academic workshops.

Regular workshops
	Date	Host	City	Country	Comment
1	18–19 September 2014	DIW Berlin	Berlin	Germany	Establishment meeting with 28 participants
2	13–14 April 2015	MCC Berlin	Berlin	Germany	
3	10–11 September 2015	Imperial College London (ICL)	London	United Kingdom	In association with Grantham Research Institute on Climate Change and the Environment
4	28–29 April 2016	KTH Royal Institute of Technology	Stockholm	Sweden	
5	27–28 October 2016	Department of Energy, Politecnico di Milano	Milan	Italy	
6	20–21 April 2017	Frankfurt Institute for Advanced Studies (FIAS)	Frankfurt	Germany	
7	12–13 October 2017	Technical University of Munich (TUM)	Munich	Germany	
8	6–8 June 2018	Climate Policy Group, ETH Zurich	Zürich	Switzerland	63 attendees
9	22–24 May 2019	Department of Engineering, Aarhus University	Aarhus	Denmark	
10	18–19 September 2019	National Renewable Energy Laboratory (NREL)	Golden, Colorado	United States	
11	15–17 January 2020	Hertie School	Berlin	Germany	Circa 190 attendees
12	March thru May 2020	2020 mini‑workshop series	online	—	During COVID-19 pandemic, 3 events for 2020
14	5 May 2021	2021 mini‑workshop	online	—	During COVID-19 pandemic
15	17 February 2022	2022 mini‑workshop	online	—	During COVID-19 pandemic
16	22–24 March 2023	International Institute for Applied Systems Analysis (IIASA)	Laxenburg, Vienna	Austria	Limited to 65 attendees
17	13–14 November 2023	Stanford University Campus	San Francisco Bay Area	United States	Limited to 80 attendees
18	26–28 March 2024	CRESYM and OTE	Grenoble	France	Limited to 100 attendees
19	25–26 March 2025	KTH Royal Institute of Technology	Stockholm	Sweden	60 attendees
20	14–15 May 2026	OET and HEC Montréal	Montréal	Canada	
21	26 June 2026	OET and University of Cape Town	Cape Town	South Africa	91 in‑person, 10 remote attendees
22	28–29 September 2026	University of Freiburg	Freiburg	Germany	100 attendees

The Open Energy Modelling Initiative also holds occasional specialist meetings.

Specialist meetings
	Date	Subject	City	Country	Comment
13	4 December 2020	Climate forecasting for energy workshop	online	—	Joint organization with S2S4E project

== See also ==
- Crowdsourcing
- Energy system – the interpretation of the energy sector in system terms
- Free Software Foundation Europe – a non-profit organisation advocating for free software in Europe
- Open data
- Open energy system models – a review of energy models that are also open source
- Open energy system databases – database projects which collect, clean, and republish energy-related datasets
