= Flensburg University of Applied Sciences =

University in Flensburg, Germany

Coordinates: 54°46′29.5″N 9°27′2″E

- Hochschule Flensburg
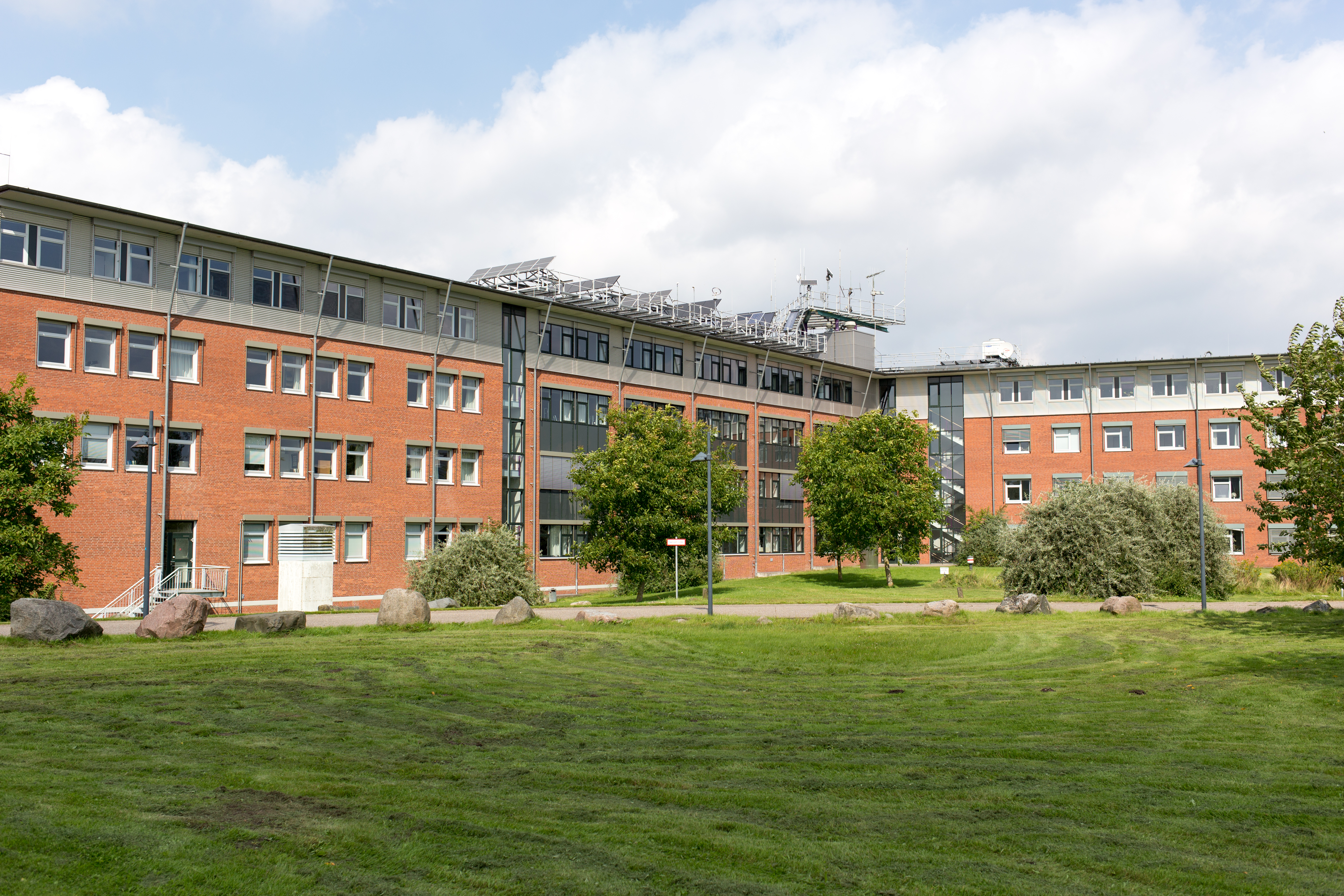
- Former name: Königliche Seedampf-Maschinistenschule
- Type: public university
- Established: 1886
- Chancellor: Klaus-Michael Heinze
- President: Prof. Dr. Niklas Klein (acting)
- Students: 3570 (winter semester 2021/22)
- Location: Hochschule Flensburg, Kanzleistrasse 91-93, 24943 Flensburg, Germany, Flensburg, Schleswig-Holstein, Germany
- Website: www.hs-flensburg.de
- data as of 2023^{1.}

Flensburg University of Applied Sciences (German Hochschule Flensburg) is a vocational university of higher education and applied research located in the city of Flensburg in the Federal State of Schleswig-Holstein. It is the northernmost university in Germany sited about 7 kilometres (4.3 mi) south of the Danish border at the Flensburg Fjord, Baltic Sea. Currently, there are around 3,500 students enrolled at the university.

== History ==
Flensburg University of Applied Sciences (FUAS) has a rich history that reflects its deep-rooted connection to the region and its commitment to applied sciences. The university's origins trace back to 1852 with the establishment of the Royal Danish School for Navigation, laying the foundation for maritime education in Flensburg. In 1886, the Königliche Seedampf-Maschinistenschule (Royal School for Naval Steam Machinists) was founded, further solidifying Flensburg's role in nautical training. Over the years, FUAS expanded its academic portfolio beyond maritime studies to include engineering, biotechnology, business, and energy disciplines. Today, FUAS stands as a modern institution offering a diverse range of programs, while maintaining its strong ties to the local community and industry.

== Education ==
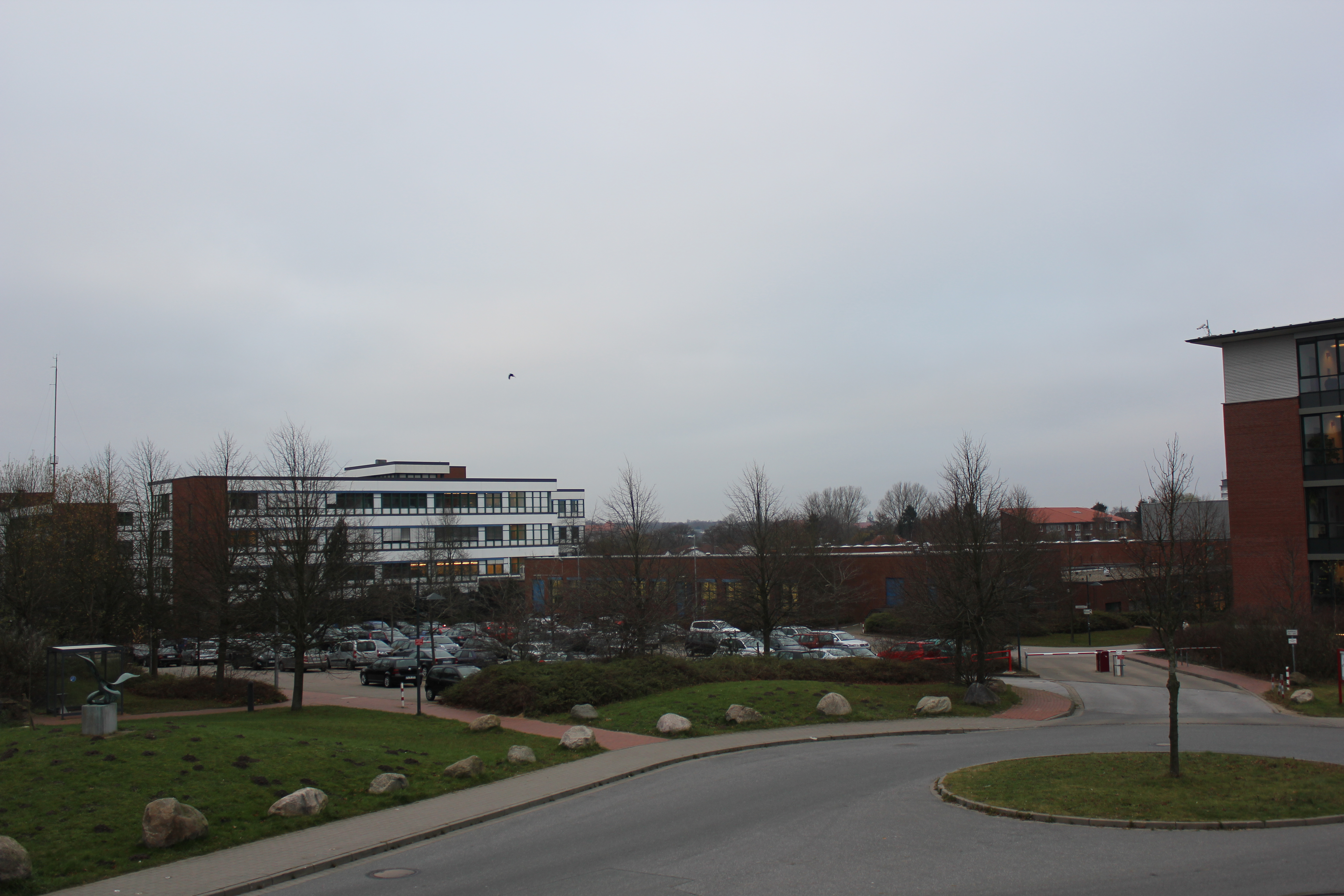
Hochschule Flensburg

Originally established as Königliche Seedampf-Maschinistenschule (Royal School for Naval Steam Machinists) the university was founded in 1886. Until 1975 the FUAS mainly educated marine engineers and officers. The expansion of the study program over the past 30 years has added all major engineering and information technology disciplines and a school for business administration.

Today, the FUAS has a strong emphasis on nautical engineering, communication technology, biotechnology and renewable energy engineering. This focus is supported by the state of Schleswig-Holstein which is one of the leading European regions in applying renewable energy and environmental technologies, covering about one third of its electricity consumption mainly by wind energy and biogas.

== Faculties ==
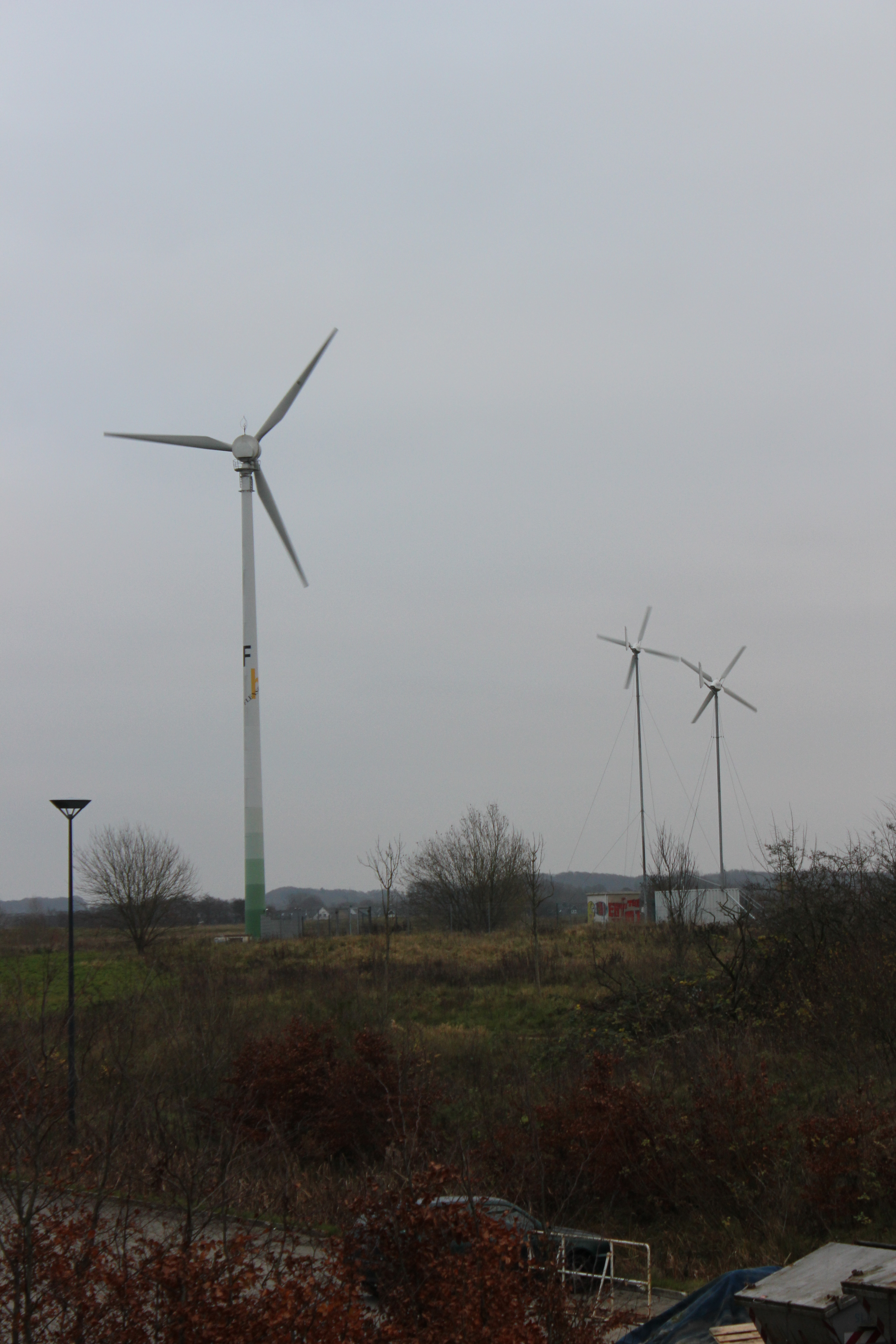
Wind wheel of Hochschule Flensburg

There are four faculties (Fachbereiche) offering undergraduate and graduate degree programs:

- Faculty of Mechanical Engineering, Process Engineering and Maritime Technologies
- Faculty of Energy and Biotechnology
- Faculty of Information and Communication
- School of Business

== Flensburg Campus ==
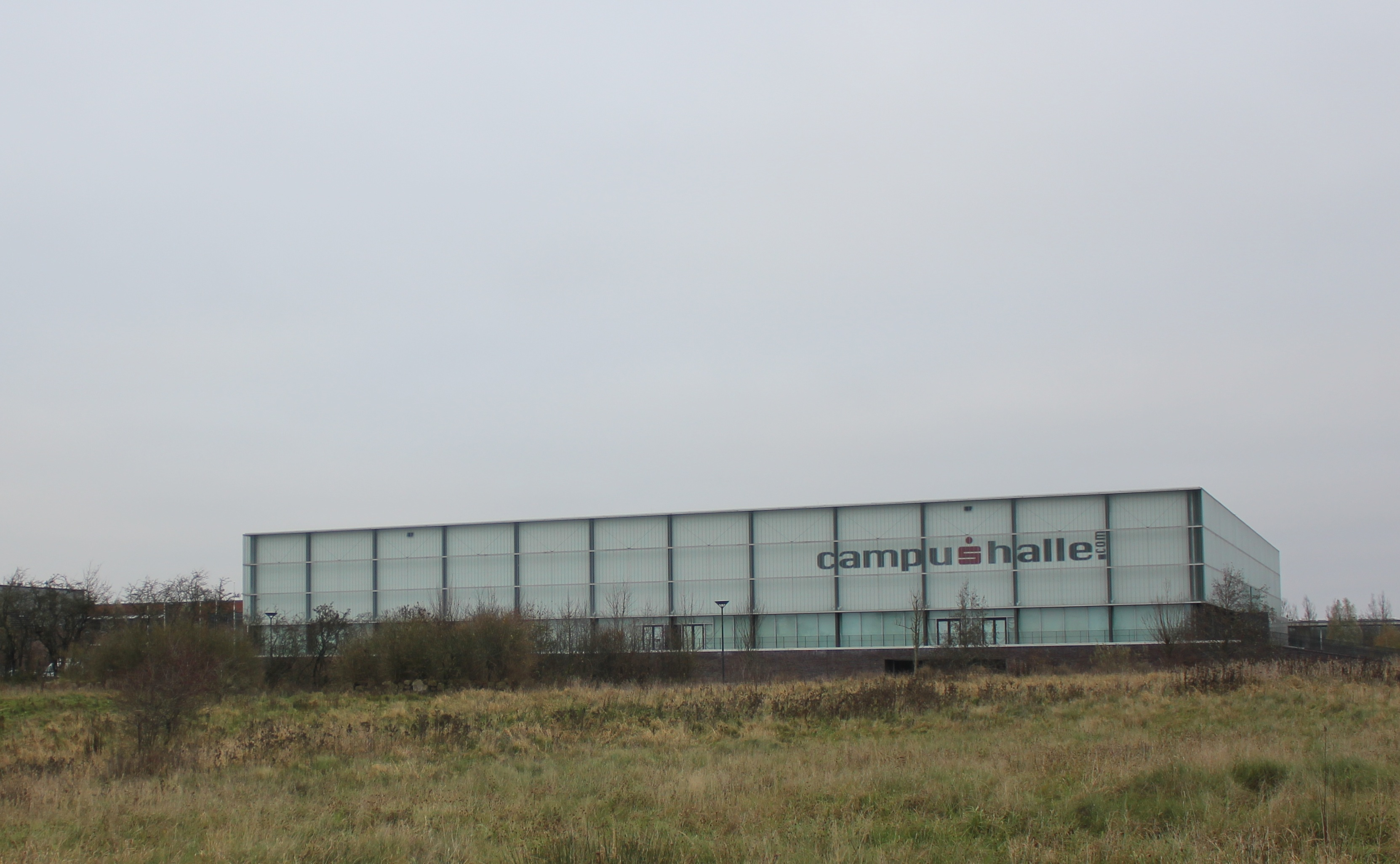
Campushalle

The FHF shares its campus with the Europa-Universität Flensburg. The infrastructure includes the Auditorium Maximum (called Audimax) lecture hall, the central library, a wide park area, student residences, a kindergarten, a sports and fitness center and the canteen (Mensa), also several small cafeterias and a student's pub. In early 2010, the construction for a water sports center and a campus chapel were completed, in 2011 the "Maritime Center" was completed.

== Research ==
The university's research initiatives are organized through various specialized institutes and centers, each focusing on key areas of innovation and development.

Research Institutes and Centers:

- Centre for Business and Technology in Africa: This center explores economic opportunities and technological advancements across the African continent, collaborating with partners in both Africa and Germany to promote sustainable development.
- Center for Interaction, Visualization, and Usability (CIVU): Focusing on human-computer interaction, data visualization, virtual reality, and usability, CIVU addresses the growing importance of user-friendly technology in everyday life.
- Flensburg Artificial Intelligence Research Institute (FLAIR): An interdisciplinary team supports the application and development of artificial intelligence (AI), uniting views on human, social, economic, and technical factors.
- Institute for eHealth and Management in Healthcare: With over two decades of experience, this institute examines the integration of digital technologies in healthcare systems, aiming to improve patient care and administrative efficiency.
- Institute for Nautics and Maritime Technology (INMT): Equipped with advanced facilities like a ship bridge simulator, INMT conducts research and training in maritime navigation and technology, enhancing safety and efficiency in seafaring.
- Jackstädt Centre Flensburg (JZF): A collaborative effort with Europa-Universität Flensburg, JZF focuses on entrepreneurship and small to medium-sized enterprise (SME) research, particularly in digitalization, innovation, and organizational design.
- Wind Energy Technology Institute (WETI): Since its establishment in 2010, WETI has been at the forefront of wind energy research, addressing topics such as turbine control systems, grid integration, and structural design.

== International ==
Several bi-national study programs are established together with the nearby University of Sønderborg, Denmark and other European partner universities within the ERASMUS programme. Partner Universities in the UK are e.g. the John Moores University in Liverpool and the University of Surrey. Oversea partners are the University of North Carolina, the North-West University in Vanderbijlpark, South Africa and the Polytechnic of Namibia in Windhoek.
