= University of Flensburg =

German university

Europa Universität Flensburg
- Europa-Universität Flensburg
- Type: Public
- Established: 1994
- Budget: € 46.1 million
- President: Christiane Hipp
- Academic staff: 449
- Administrative staff: 217
- Students: 5,285
- Location: Flensburg, Schleswig-Holstein, Germany; 54°46′34″N 9°27′07″E
- Website: uni-flensburg.de

The University of Flensburg (Europa-Universität Flensburg; EUF) is a university in the city of Flensburg, Germany. It was founded in 1994 and is the northernmost university in Germany. Although it has full university status and the right to award PhDs, Europa-Universität Flensburg mainly offers courses in education and other fields of the social sciences.

The university holds German-Danish undergraduate courses in cooperation with the University of Southern Denmark at Sønderborg, which involve an association with the Fachhochschule Flensburg.

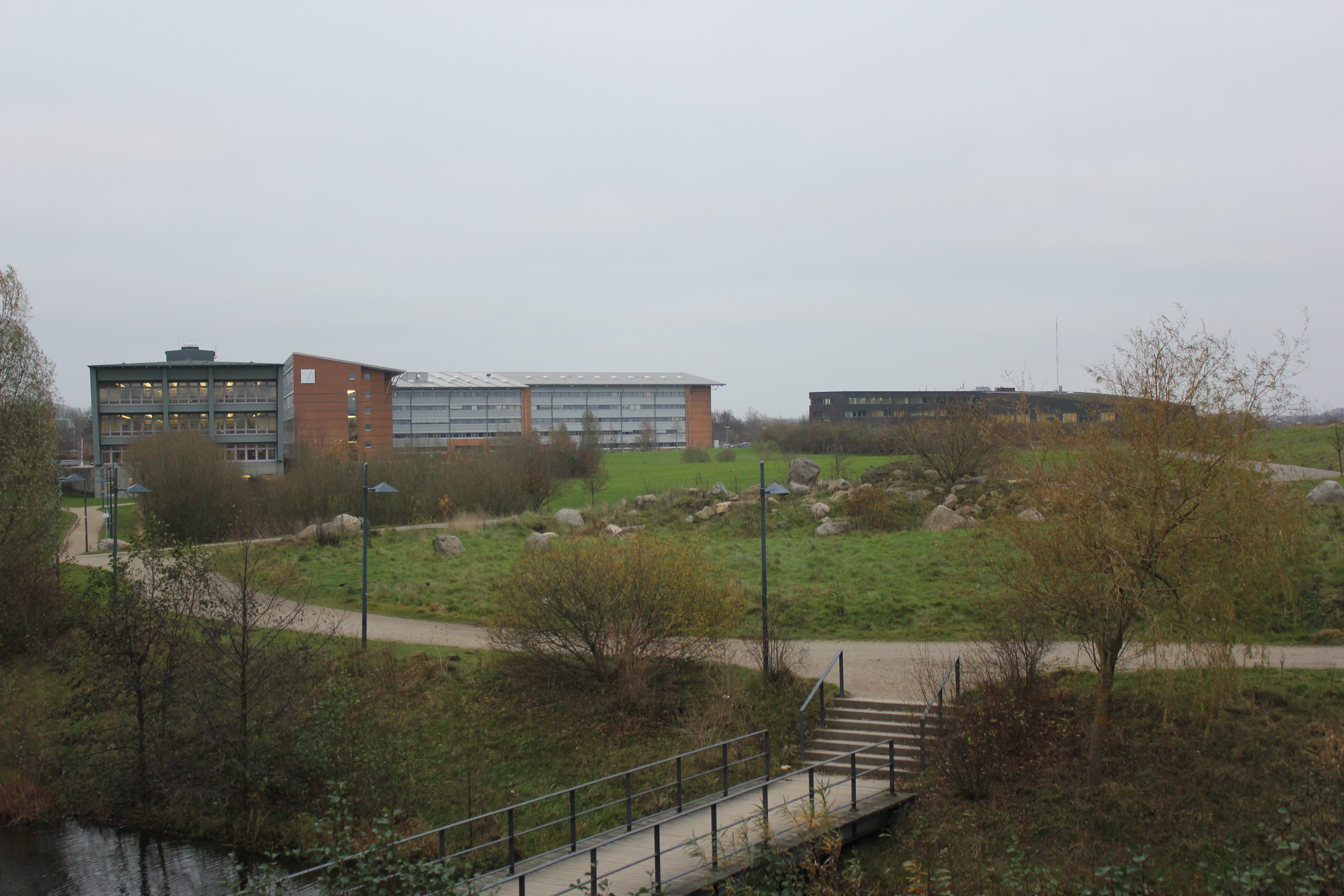
University of Flensburg

== Academics ==
The university has around 450 academic staff and 200 administrative staff, as of 2022.

In the winter semester 2006/2007, the university received around 4,200 applications for places, but in the winter semester of the previous academic year the number was only 2,566. At the top of the applications in the winter semester 2006/2007 was the B.A. course in Teaching Science, 1977 applicants, followed by the B.A. course in International Management with 547 candidates. The B.A. course in Science of the Communication and Teaching is discontinued. The B.A. course in Teaching Science and B.A. course in International Management have since been the only undergraduate programmes that the university offers.

== History ==
The University of Flensburg, officially known as Europa-Universität Flensburg (EUF), was established in 1946 as the Pädagogische Hochschule Flensburg (Flensburg College of Education). In 1994, the institution was granted full university status and adopted the name University of Flensburg. Situated in the northernmost part of Germany, EUF has evolved into a dynamic university focusing on teacher education, European studies, and interdisciplinary research, while maintaining a strong commitment to democratic values and regional collaboration.

== Campus ==
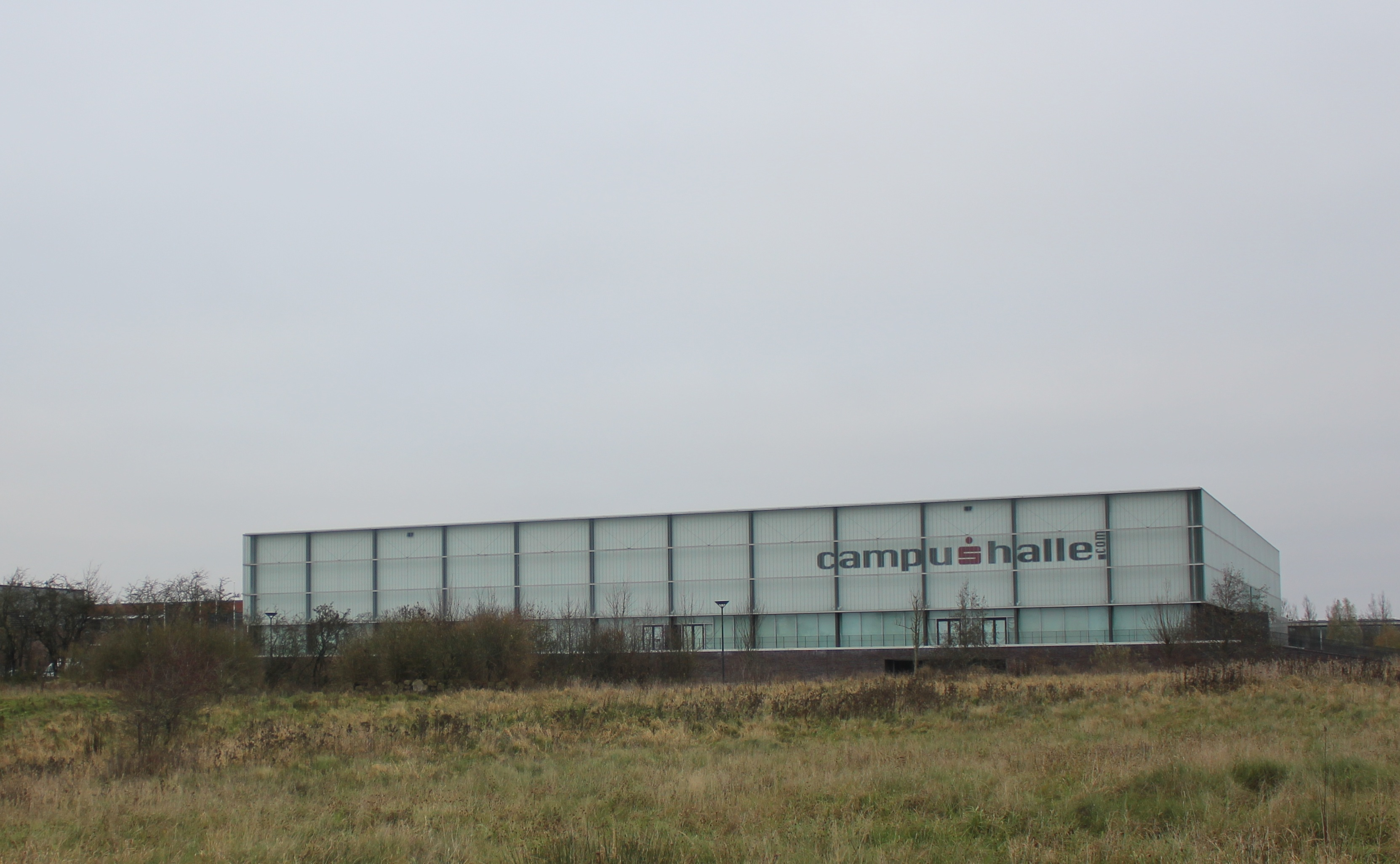
Flens-Arena, formerly Campushalle

Europa-Universität Flensburg shares a campus and some facilities with the Flensburg University of Applied Sciences (Hochschule Flensburg). The infrastructure includes the Auditorium Maximum (called Audimax) lecture hall, the central library, a broad park area, student residences, a kindergarten, a sports and fitness centre, the cafeteria (Mensa), several small cafeterias and a student pub, a swimming pool and a campus chapel.

== International ==
Europa-Universität Flensburg (EUF) conducts international partnerships, student exchanges, and supports international students. The International Center coordinates mobility programs, assists incoming students, and offers intercultural training. EUF collaborates with over 80 partner universities.

The university provides extensive student mobility support, including assistance with visas, housing, and orientation programs. Additionally, the Language Center offers courses to enhance language proficiency and integration. EUF also participates in international projects like eMERGE

== Research ==
Europa-Universität Flensburg (EUF) conducts research in areas such as education, interdisciplinary European studies, and sustainability and transformation studies. The university fosters collaborative research.

Research Centers at EUF:

- Center for Research on Education, Teaching, Schooling, and Socialization (ZeBUSS): Focuses on educational sciences, emphasizing research in teaching methodologies and learning environments.
- Interdisciplinary Centre for European Studies (ICES): Integrates approaches from cultural studies, humanities, social sciences, media studies, and economics to explore Europe's multifaceted structures and processes.
- Center for Research on Sustainability and Transformation (CREST): Conducts problem-oriented and practical research on sustainability challenges, combining perspectives from natural sciences, social sciences, and humanities.

EUF provides research for society and industry.

== See also ==
- Flensburg catamaran
