= Statistical study of energy data =

Energy statistics refers to collecting, compiling, analyzing and disseminating data on commodities such as coal, crude oil, natural gas, electricity, or renewable energy sources (biomass, geothermal, wind or solar energy), when they are used for the energy they contain. Energy is the capability of some substances, resulting from their physico-chemical properties, to do work or produce heat. Some energy commodities, called fuels, release their energy content as heat when they burn. This heat could be used to run an internal or external combustion engine.

The need to have statistics on energy commodities became obvious during the 1973 oil crisis that brought tenfold increase in petroleum prices. Before the crisis, to have accurate data on global energy supply and demand was not deemed critical. Another concern of energy statistics today is a huge gap in energy use between developed and developing countries. As the gap narrows (see picture), the pressure on energy supply increases tremendously.

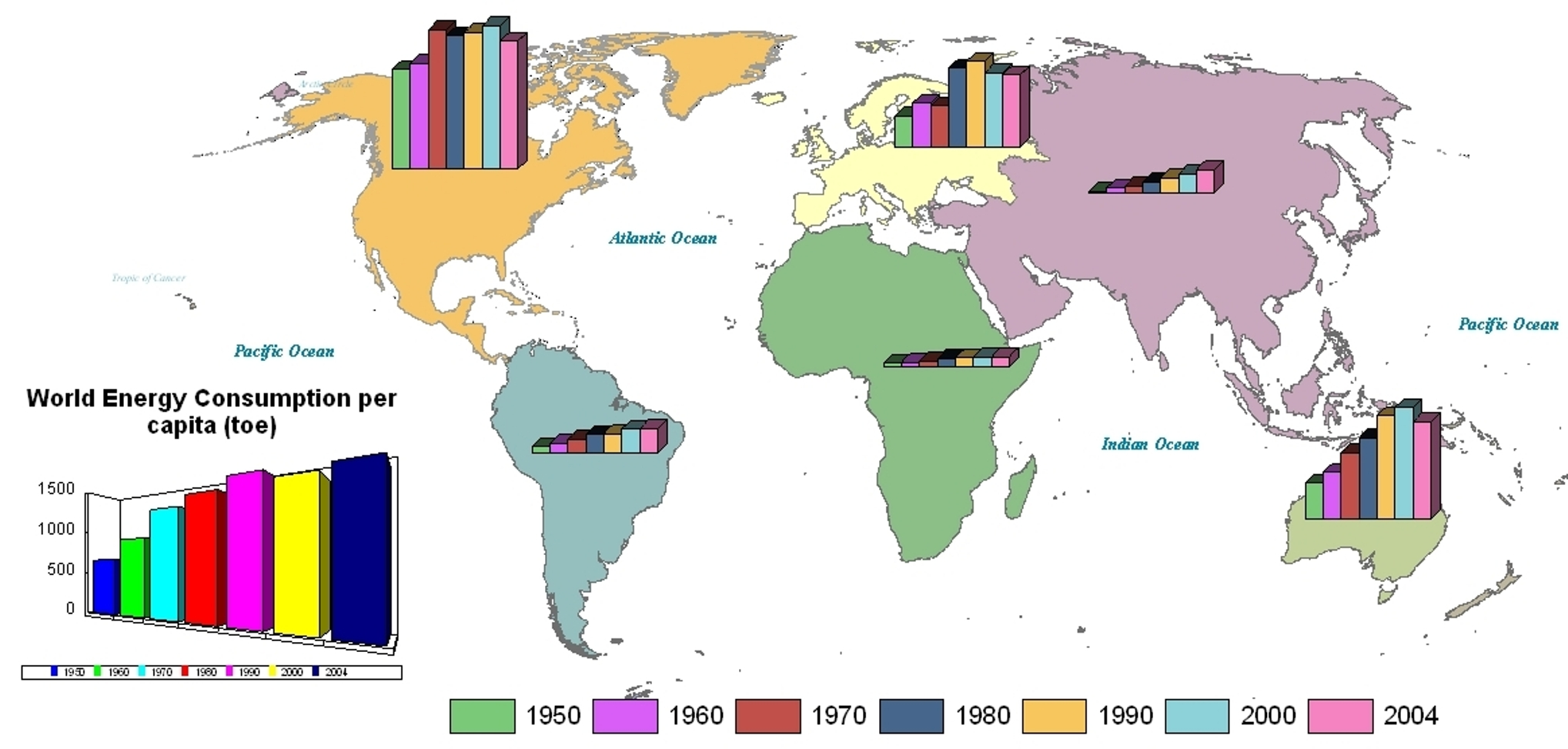
Global energy consumption per capita, 1950-2004

The data on energy and electricity come from three principal sources:

- Energy industry
- Other industries ("self-producers")
- Consumers

The flows of and trade in energy commodities are measured both in physical units (e.g., metric tons), and, when energy balances are calculated, in energy units (e.g., terajoules or tons of oil equivalent). What makes energy statistics specific and different from other fields of economic statistics is the fact that energy commodities undergo greater number of transformations (flows) than other commodities. In these transformations energy is conserved, as defined by and within the limitations of the first and second laws of thermodynamics.

== See also ==
- Energy system
- World energy resources and consumption

== Publications ==
- Energy Statistics Yearbook 2004, United Nations, 2006
- Energy Balances and Electricity Profiles 2004, United Nations, 2006
