= Energy carrier =

Type of fuel

An energy carrier is a substance (fuel) or sometimes a phenomenon (energy system) that contains energy that can be later converted to other forms such as mechanical work or heat or to operate chemical or physical processes.

Such carriers include springs, electrical batteries, capacitors, pressurized air, dammed water, hydrogen, metal energy carriers, petroleum, coal, wood, and natural gas. An energy carrier does not produce energy; it simply contains energy imbued by another system.

== Definition according to ISO 13600 ==
According to ISO 13600, an energy carrier is either a substance or a phenomenon that can be used to produce mechanical work or heat or to operate chemical or physical processes. It is any system or substance that contains energy for conversion as usable energy later or somewhere else. This could be converted for use in, for example, an appliance or vehicle. Such carriers include springs, electrical batteries, capacitors, pressurized air, dammed water, hydrogen, petroleum, coal, wood, and natural gas.

ISO 13600 series (ISO 13600, ISO 13601, and ISO 13602) are intended to be used as tools to define, describe, analyse and compare technical energy systems (TES) at micro and macro levels:

- ISO 13600 (Technical energy systems — Basic concepts) covers basic definitions and terms needed to define and describe TESs in general and TESs of energyware supply and demand sectors in particular.
- ISO 13601 (Technical energy systems — Structure for analysis — Energyware supply and demand sectors) covers structures that shall be used to describe and analyse sub-sectors at the macro level of energyware supply and demand
- ISO 13602 (all parts) facilitates the description and analysis of any technical energy systems.

== Definition within the field of energetics ==
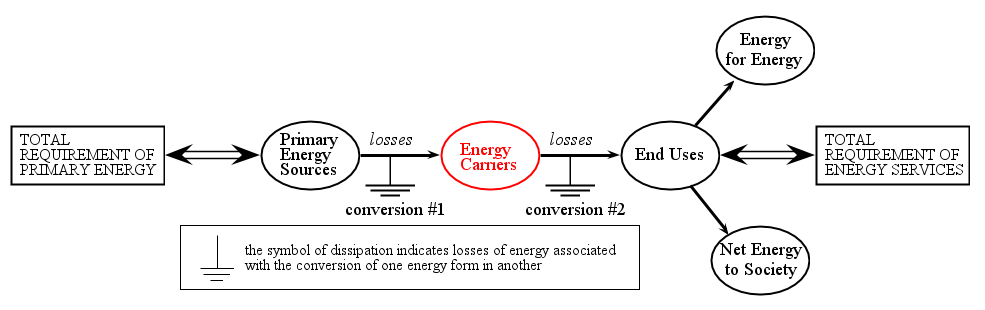
Energy carriers are produced by the energy sector using primary energy sources.

In the field of energetics, an energy carrier is produced by human technology from a primary energy source. Only the energy sector uses primary energy sources. Other sectors of society use an energy carrier to perform useful activities (end-uses). The distinction between "Energy Carriers" (EC) and "Primary Energy Sources" (PES) is extremely important. An energy carrier can be more valuable (have a higher quality) than a primary energy source. For example 1 megajoule (MJ) of electricity produced by a hydroelectric plant is equivalent to 3 MJ of oil. Sunlight is a main source of primary energy, which can be transformed into plants and then into coal, oil and gas. Solar power and wind power are other derivatives of sunlight. Note that although coal, oil and natural gas are derived from sunlight, they are considered primary energy sources which are extracted from the earth (fossil fuels). Natural uranium is also a primary energy source extracted from the earth but does not come from the decomposition of organisms (mineral fuel).

== See also ==
- Capital goods
- Coefficient of performance
- Embedded energy
- Energy and society
- Energy crisis
- Energy pay-back
- Energy resource
- Energy source
- Energy storage
- Energyware
- Entropy
- Exergy
- Future energy development
- Hydrogen economy
- ISO 14000
- Liquid nitrogen economy
- Lithium economy
- Methanol economy
- Metal Energy Carriers
- Renewable resource
- Vegetable oil economy
- Renewable Energy
