= Renewables.ninja =

Renewables.ninja is a web tool developed by Imperial College London and ETH Zürich that shows the estimated amount of energy that could be generated by wind or solar farms at any location. The model has been tested by Iain Staffell who is the co‑developer of renewables.ninja, from the Centre for Environmental Policy at Imperial College London, and Stefan Pfenninger from ETH Zürich to estimate the productivity of all wind farms planned or under construction in Europe for the next 20 years. German electrical supplier RWE are using it to test their own models of output.
