= John Weyant =

American economist

John P. Weyant is a research professor of management science and engineering at Stanford University. He obtained his PhD from UC Berkeley in management science in 1976 and has been at Stanford since 1977. His research is focused on climate change, energy security, corporate strategy analysis, and energy policy in Japan.

Weyant is the director of the Energy Modeling Forum, an editor of Energy Economics, and a lead author of the IPCC (the work of the IPCC, including the contributions of many scientists, was recognised by the joint award of the 2007 Nobel Peace Prize). Weyant co-authored the book Renewed Energy with Ernestine Fu and Justin Bowersock. He is a key figure in the academic communities of energy economics, integrated assessment modelling, and climate economics, and has been influential in shaping the international policy debate on climate policy.
