= Licence Ouverte =

French open license

The Licence Ouverte logo

The Licence Ouverte / Open Licence is a French open license published on October 18, 2011 by Etalab for open data from the State of France. The license was designed to be compatible with Creative Commons Licenses, Open Government License, and the Open Data Commons Attribution License. Information released under the Open License may be re-used with attribution, such as a URL or other identification of the producer. The Open License is used by the city of Bordeaux, France to release data sets.
