= Strahlendes Klima =

Strahlendes Klima e.V.
- Founded: 10 June 2010
- Type: Non-governmental organization, Non-profit organization
- Purpose: Environmentalism, Education
- Location: Berlin, Germany
- Region served: Global
- Method: Documentaries, Open content
- Website: strahlendesklima.de

Strahlendes Klima e.V is a registered non-profit organization that produces films and media focusing on the issues of energy and resources for an environmentally friendly, more climate conscious world. Their main concept is to build a decentralised activist network in order to distribute topical content in terms of open licence publications. By offering free educational media they aim to raise awareness for environmental conservation.

== History ==
In late 2006 political scientist Kerstin Schnatz and cinematographer Isabel Huber began to research on uranium. They intended to do a documentary film focussing on the origins of nuclear power, especially the nuclear cycle and uranium mining. After having gathered a film crew of volunteers, the film was shot in Australia, France and Germany. In 2009 the international version of the documentary "Uranium - is it a country?" (53 min.) was released and nominated for the newcomer's award "Goldener Schlüssel" at Kasseler Dokumentarfilm- und Videofest in Germany.

The film crew decided to distribute the documentary under an open licence model to spread the content. The film has been screened thousands of times all around the world due to its decentralised distribution coordinated by online networking activists. It has been used heavily for political campaigning up to the German federal election in September 2009 as the nuclear power phase-out decided during Gerhard Schröder's chancellorship, was announced to be taken back by the right-wing parties led by Angela Merkel.

In the summer of 2010 the film crew decided to found a non-profit organisation (Strahlendes Klima e.V.) to keep up the work on environmental issues.

== Activities ==
Strahlendes Klima e.V. helps activists to organize film screenings and debates on environmental issues. They organise workshops for schools and non-profits and release educational films and media on a regular basis. In 2010 "At Eyelevel" their film about indigenous peoples facing the problems of uranium mining was released.

In 2011 Goethe Institut-Shanghai invited the organisation to visit China. A short film treating renewable energies in China is expected to be released in mid-2012. They recently started the shooting of a new feature-length documentary on sustainable waste strategies, which will be available licensed under creative commons by 2013.

== See also ==
- American Council on Renewable Energy (ACORE)
- International Partnership for Energy Efficiency Cooperation
- International Renewable Energy Conference
- Lists about renewable energy
- REEEP
- Renewable Energy Policy Network(REN21)
- Renewable energy commercialization
- Solar Energy Industries Association (SEIA)
- Solar for All
- United Nations Environment Organization
