= Eric Martinot =

American researcher on global renewable energy policy and markets

Eric Martinot is senior research director with the Institute for Sustainable Energy Policies in Tokyo, Japan, specialising in renewable energy commercialization. He is author of the 2013 REN21 Renewables Global Futures Report, and former lead author of the REN21 Renewables Global Status Report (2005–2010), an annual compilation of progress with renewable energy worldwide.

From 2005 to 2008 Martinot lived in Beijing, where he was senior visiting scholar at Tsinghua University and researched China's approach to renewable energy use. From 2000 to 2003, he was senior energy analyst with the World Bank (Washington DC) where he managed renewable energy projects for developing countries.

Eric Martinot has written 70 publications on sustainable energy. He has M.A. and Ph.D. degrees in Energy and Resources from the University of California at Berkeley (1991 and 1995) and a B.S. in electrical engineering from MIT (1984).

== See also ==
- Amory Lovins – American energy policy analyst
- Benjamin K. Sovacool – American academic
- Stephen Thomas (economist)
- Mark Diesendorf – Australian academic and environmentalist
- Kick The Fossil Fuel Habit – 2010 book by Tom Rand
- Energy policy – How a government or business deals with energy
- International Renewable Energy Agency (IRENA)
- Reegle (Information Gateway for Renewable Energy and Energy Efficiency)
