= Suding =

Suding is a surname. Notable people with the surname include:

- Katja Suding (born 1975), German politician (FDP)
- Katharine N. Suding, American plant ecologist
- Lorenzo Suding (born 1986), German-Italian professional mountain biker
- Paul Hugo Suding (born 1949), German energy economist and international development specialist,
