= La Camera =

La Camera is a surname. Notable people with the surname include:

- Francesco La Camera, Italian civil servant
- Giovanni La Camera (born 1983), Italian football midfielder

== See also ==
- Paul LaCamera (born 1963), retired United States Army general
- Pedro Ruiz de la Camera (fl. 1524), auxiliary bishop of Toledo, Spain
