= Hélène Pelosse =

French official

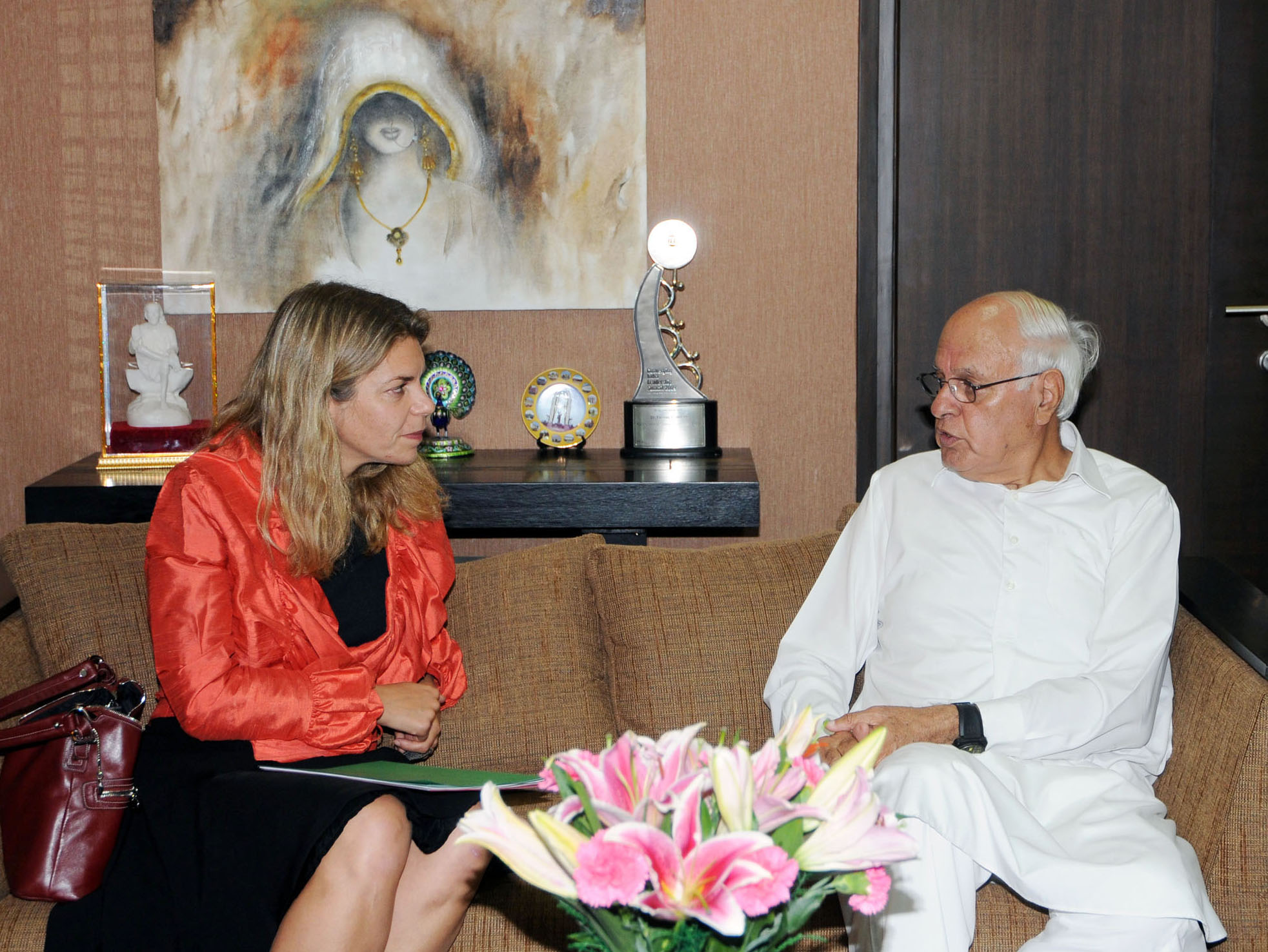
Helene Pelosse, in her capacity as the Director General of International Renewable Energy Agency, meeting the Union Minister of New and Renewable Energy, Dr. Farooq Abdullah, in New Delhi on 10 September 2009

Hélène Pelosse (born 5 March 1970) was the first elected Interim Director-General of the International Renewable Energy Agency (IRENA). She served in this position for 15 months, from 30 June 2009 until 19 October 2010.

== Biography ==
Pelosse is a citizen of France and was born in Montreal, Canada. She graduated from the École nationale d'administration and the École supérieure des sciences économiques et commerciales. After graduation, she worked in the Inspectorate General of Finances in the Ministry of Finance of France. In 1999–2001, Pelosse worked for Saint-Gobain. In this period, she was posted in Worcester, Massachusetts, as the Director of Strategy. From 2001 to 2005, Pelosse was the financial and later trade adviser in the French Prime Minister's Office. In 2007, during the German EU Presidency, she served as an adviser in Angela Merkel's private office. After the German EU Presidency Hélène Pelosse worked as the Deputy Head of Staff in charge of international affairs in the Private Office of the French Minister of State in charge of Ecology, Energy, Sustainable Development, and Town and Country Planning, Jean-Louis Borloo (cabinet Fillon II).

On 30 June 2009, Pelosse was elected as the Interim Director-General of IRENA. She resigned on 19 October 2010. According to Pelosse, the United Arab Emirates, the host country of the IRENA, asked France to make her resign because she made a gender parity a priority of the IRENA. She also accused UAE authorities of intimidation by intruding into her home, bugging her phone and office, and searching her baggage. According to her, "if we had wanted a IRENA that works, it would not have taken the installation in Abu Dhabi", notwithstanding the fact that electing Abu Dhabi as a location of the headquarters was supported by France. Her successor in the post, Adnan Amin, referred to management problems instead. Financial mismanagement and lack of good accounting standards were also cited, in addition to Pelosse's opposition to the carbon capture and nuclear energy. After IRENA, Pelosse returned to the General Inspectorate for Finances of France.

Pelosse is married and has 3 children.

== Filmography ==
- Documentary film, Les Survivantes, by Pierre Barnérias, 2024.
