= Electricity aggregator =

Type of electricity supplier

An electricity aggregator is defined by the International Renewable Energy Agency as: "Aggregators are a new market player that can optimise the use of distributed energy resources."

In EU the term "aggregator" was introduced with EU-directive 2019/944 on common rules for the internal market for electricity. The aggregator is an actor that combines small resources and aggregates their inherent flexibility so that the combined aggregated flexibility is big enough to us for explicit flexibility, such as the ancillary services. The aggregated resources can also be used to facilitate implicit flexibility, for example to optimize the connected resources according to the day ahead-price.
