= Dennis V. McGinn =

Former American government official; retired admiral

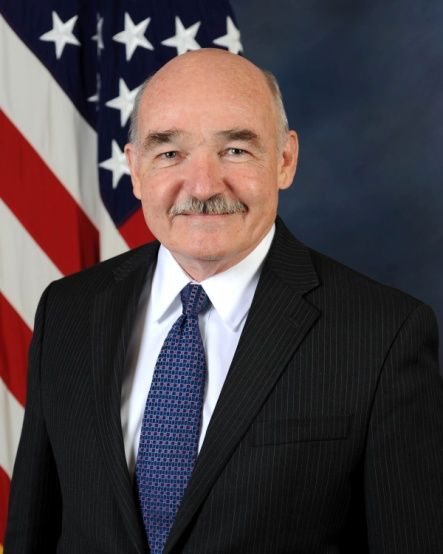
- Official portrait, c. 2013

Assistant Secretary of the Navy for Energy, Installations and Environment
- In office September 3, 2013 – January 20, 2017
- President: Barack Obama
- Preceded by: Jackalyne Pfannenstiel
- Succeeded by: Phyllis L. Bayer

Personal details
- Born: August 26, 1945 (age 81) Attleboro, Massachusetts, U.S.
- Children: 4
- Education: United States Naval Academy (BS); Naval War College (Note: As Fellow); Harvard Kennedy School

Military service
- Allegiance: United States of America
- Branch/service: United States Navy
- Years of service: 1967–2002
- Rank: Vice Admiral
- Commands: United States Third Fleet; Carrier Group 1; USS Ranger (CV-61); USS Wichita (AOR-1); VFA-125; VA-27; Light Attack Weapons School
- Battles/wars: Vietnam War; Gulf War
- Awards: Navy Distinguished Service Medal (2); Defense Superior Service Medal; Legion of Merit (4); Distinguished Flying Cross

Dennis Vincent McGinn (born August 26, 1945) is a former American government official and retired United States Navy admiral. He served as Assistant Secretary of the Navy for Energy, Installations and Environment in the Obama administration from 2013 to 2017. A career naval aviator, McGinn was an officer in the United States Navy for 35 years, retiring as a vice admiral.

Outside of government, McGinn held memberships and advisory posts in various government-affiliated, corporate and non-profit organizations. Since 2018, McGinn has served on the board of directors of the Electric Power Research Institute (EPRI).

== Early life and education ==
Born on August 26, 1945, McGinn is a native of Attleboro, Massachusetts. He graduated from the United States Naval Academy in 1967 with a B.S. degree in naval engineering. McGinn attended the U.S. Naval Test Pilot School in 1973 and the Naval War College in 1990 as a CNO Strategic Studies Fellow. He also participated in the National Security Program under the Harvard Kennedy School.

== Military career ==
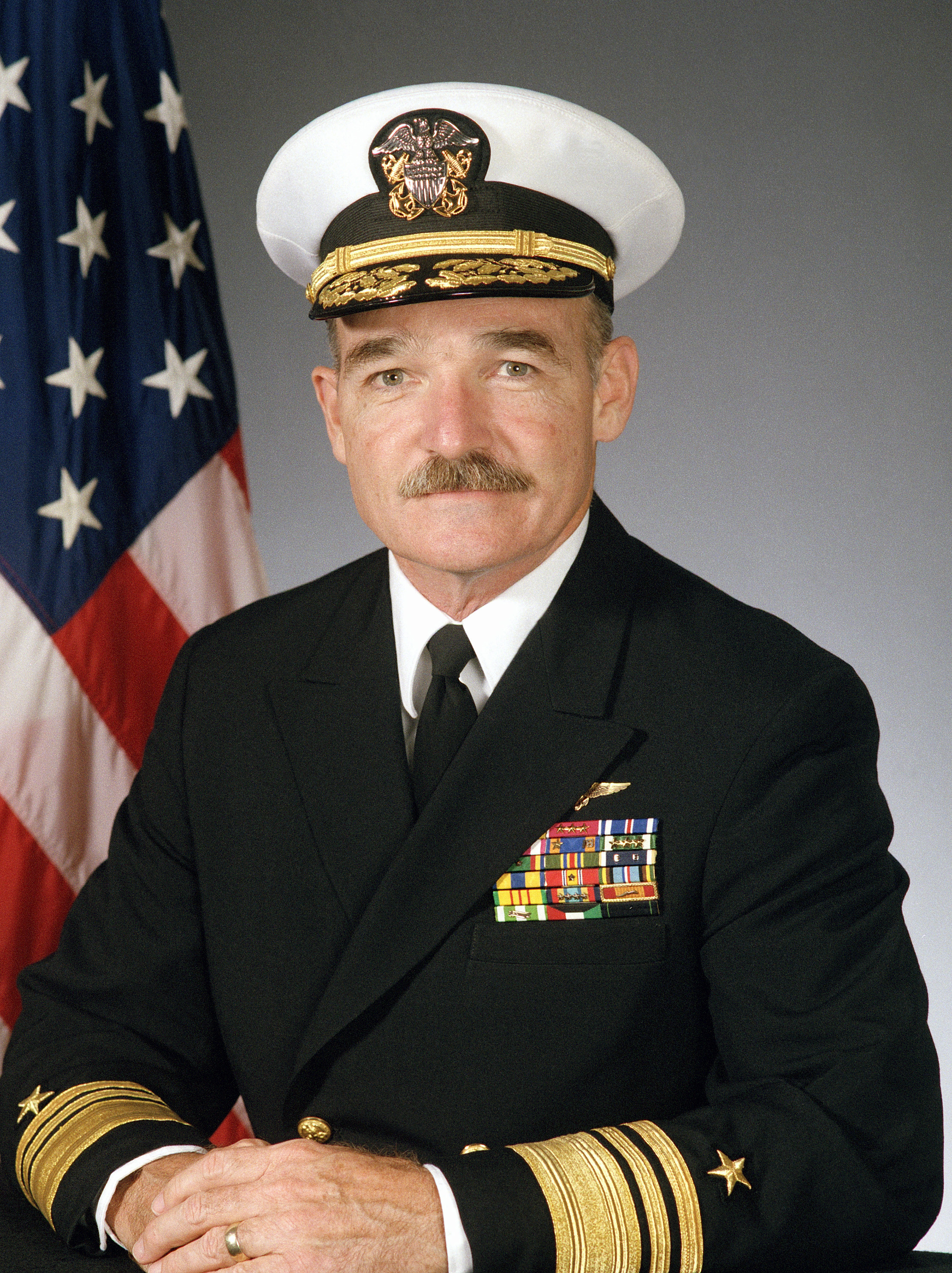
Vice Admiral McGinn in 1998

McGinn received his commission on June 7, 1967, and was designated as a naval aviator in January 1969. He served two operational deployments at sea aboard the aircraft carrier USS Ranger (CV-61) as a landing signal officer and weapons officer respectively.

His early seaborne assignments included serving as the operations and maintenance officer of Attack Squadron 146 aboard USS Constellation (CV-64) and executive officer of USS Coral Sea (CV-43). As a lieutenant commander and then commander, he commanded the Light Attack Weapons School, as well as the strike fighter squadrons VFA-125 and VA-27.

As a captain, McGinn commanded the fleet replenishment oiler USS Wichita (AOR-1) and served as the final commanding officer of the Forrestal-class aircraft carrier USS Ranger (CV-61) from August 21, 1991, to July 10, 1993, making an extended western Pacific and Indian Ocean deployment.

Upon promotion to rear admiral (lower half), McGinn was assigned as chief of information systems and chief negotiator, Allied Command Europe Restructuring at Supreme Headquarters Allied Powers Europe, and commanded Carrier Group 1 from 1995 to 1996. He became Director, Air Warfare Division of the Office of the Chief of Naval Operations in January 1996, and was promoted to rear admiral in September.

McGinn's nomination as a vice admiral was confirmed on June 25, 1998, and he subsequently commanded the United States Third Fleet from November 1998 to October 2000. His capstone assignment was as the first Deputy Chief of Naval Operations for Warfare Requirements and Programs, and he retired in September 2002.

== Private civilian career ==
McGinn's experiences during the 1973 oil crisis instilled in him a longtime goal to reduce America's overreliance on fossil fuels, believing that it compromised the economy and national security. Consequently, he has joined various organizations that promote clean and renewable energy sources. McGinn said that "there is no one perfect new energy solution—we need a silver buckshot approach because there's not a silver bullet".

McGinn served as board chairman of the United States Naval Institute from 2001 to 2002, a member (later vice chairman) of the CNA Military Advisory Board from 2007 to 2013, and president and CEO of the American Council on Renewable Energy from 2011 to 2013. Under CNA, he worked closely with former Republican senator John Warner. Additionally, McGinn has been an International Security Senior Fellow of the Rocky Mountain Institute since 2002.

== Government career ==
In 2004, McGinn was appointed to the National Commission on Disabled Veterans Benefits, a government commission mandated by the 2004 NDAA to study the impact of Operation Enduring Freedom and Operation Iraqi Freedom on Department of Defense and Department of Veterans Affairs resources. The commission released its findings in October 2007. McGinn was appointed to the Department of Energy Electricity Advisory Board in 2012.

=== Assistant Secretary of the Navy for Energy, Installations and Environment ===
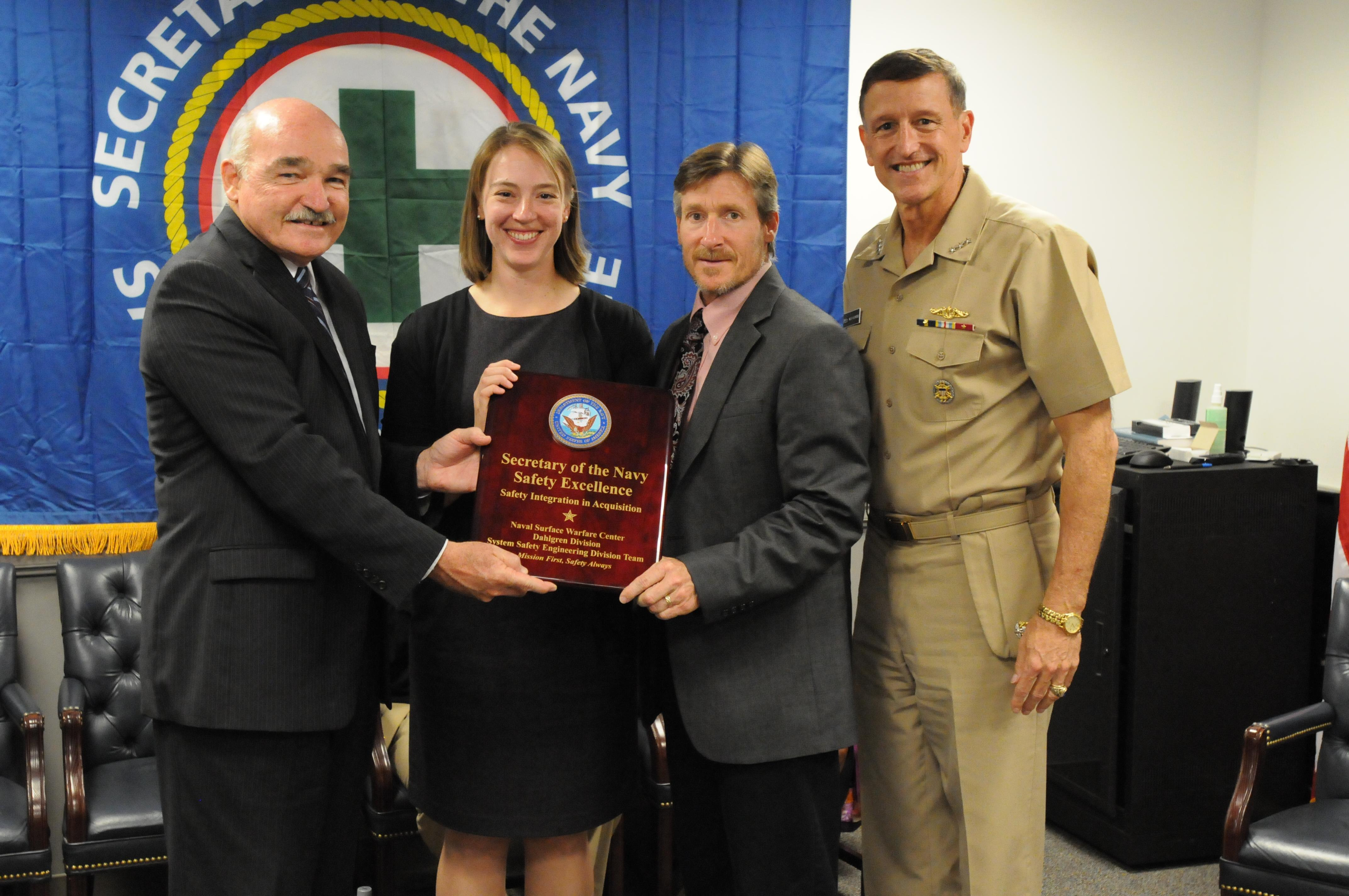
McGinn (far left) and Vice Adm. William H. Hilarides, commander of Naval Sea Systems Command (far right) present the Safety Integration in Acquisition Award to Rebecca Funkhouser and Robert Heflin on October 20, 2014.

On July 8, 2013, it was announced that McGinn would be nominated by President Barack Obama to be Assistant Secretary of the Navy for Energy, Installations and Environment, replacing Jackalyne Pfannenstiel. At his confirmation hearing, he pledged to consult Congress on any new energy programs initiated by the Navy and to carefully consider "opportunity costs" when reviewing such programs. He was confirmed by the Senate on August 1, 2013, and assumed office on September 3, 2013.

As ASN(EI&E), McGinn was responsible for overseeing Navy functions and programs related to energy, installations, safety and the environment, including the occupational safety of military and civilian personnel. He gave a positive appraisal of the energy initiatives of Marine Corps Logistics Base Albany, commenting that the base has "a good technologically-savvy workforce, a culture that is looking for ways to really value and save energy with energy efficiency". He resigned on January 20, 2017, to make way for the incoming Trump administration.

== Post-government career ==
Since leaving the government, McGinn has continued to occupy advisory roles in various energy-related organizations. On April 12, 2018, it was announced that McGinn had been elected to a four-year term on the board of directors of the Electric Power Research Institute.

In July 2018, McGinn wrote an op-ed through CNN that was critical of the Trump administration's climate change policy and Trump's focus on NATO defense spending.

== Personal life ==
McGinn is married to Susan Kelly Harris. They have 4 children.

In the 2024 United States presidential election, McGinn endorsed Kamala Harris.

== Awards and decorations ==

United States Naval Aviator insignia
Navy Distinguished Service Medal with two award stars
Defense Superior Service Medal	Legion of Merit with three award stars	Distinguished Flying Cross
Meritorious Service Medal with award star	Air Medal with award star and numeral "1" and "8" devices	Navy and Marine Corps Commendation Medal with three award stars
Navy Unit Commendation with bronze service star	Navy Meritorious Unit Commendation	Navy "E" Ribbon, 2nd award
Navy Expeditionary Medal	National Defense Service Medal with bronze service star	Armed Forces Expeditionary Medal
Vietnam Service Medal	Navy Sea Service Deployment Ribbon with four bronze service stars	Republic of Vietnam Gallantry Cross Unit Citation with Palm and Frame
RVN Campaign Medal with "1960-" device	Kuwait Liberation Medal (Kuwait)	Navy Pistol Marksmanship Medal

== Bibliography ==
- Statement of Vice Admiral Dennis McGinn, USN, Retired, Member, Military Advisory Board, CNA before the Senate Environment and Public Works Committee for a Hearing on "Climate Change and National Security" (PDF), Washington, D. C.: Senate Environment and Public Works Committee, July 30, 2009
- McGinn, Dennis (September 30, 2011), "The Supply and Demand of Renewable Energy", The Huffington Post
- Richards, William; McGinn, Dennis (November 20, 2011), "Supercommittee should preserve farm energy programs in the farm bill for in the best interest of the nation: William Richards and Dennis McGinn", The Baltimore Sun
- McGinn, Dennis; Shea, Ernest (December 5, 2011), "Farm energy programs do double duty", The Baltimore Sun
- McGinn, Dennis (March 4, 2013), "OPINION: Dennis McGinn of ACORE", Recharge
- McGinn, Dennis (June 24, 2013), "Level playing field for renewables", Politico
- McGinn, Dennis (July 4, 2013), "American renewable energy is powering the American energy transformation", The Hill
- Statement of The Honorable Dennis V. McGinn, Assistant Secretary of the Navy (Energy, Installations & Environment) before the Subcommittee on Readiness and Management Support (PDF), Washington, D. C.: Senate Armed Services Committee, April 2, 2014
- McGinn, Dennis; Belote, Dave (February 16, 2020), "Dennis McGinn & Dave Belote: Climate change poses grave threat to national security", The Virginian-Pilot

Military offices
Preceded by Herbert A. Browne II	Commander of the United States Third Fleet; 1998–2000	Succeeded by Toney M. Bucchi
New office	Deputy Chief of Naval Operations for Warfare Requirements and Programs; 2000–2002	Succeeded by John B. Nathman
Political offices
Preceded by Jackalyne Pfannenstiel	Assistant Secretary of the Navy (Energy, Installations and Environment); 2013–2017	Succeeded by Steve Iselin; Acting
