= Jackalyne Pfannenstiel =

American government official (1947–2017)

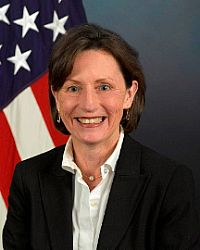

United States Assistant Secretary of the Navy for Installations and Environment
- In office March 5, 2010 – July 2012
- President: Barack Obama
- Preceded by: Roger M. Natsuhara (acting)
- Succeeded by: Dennis V. McGinn

Personal details
- Born: September 7, 1947 Norwich, Connecticut
- Died: April 26, 2017 (aged 69) Piedmont, California

Jackalyne Pfannenstiel (September 7, 1947 – April 26, 2017) served as the United States Assistant Secretary of the Navy (Installations and Environment) from March 5, 2010. until her resignation in July 2012.

== Biography ==
Jackalyne Pfannenstiel was educated at Clark University, receiving a Bachelor of Arts in Economics. She then attended the University of Hartford, receiving a Master of Arts in Economics.

After university, she worked as an economist at the Connecticut Department of Public Utility Control. In 1978, she moved to California, joining the California Public Utilities Commission as a senior economist.

In 1980, she moved to the Pacific Gas and Electric Company, initially working in utility rate setting and other regulatory matters. She became PG&E's Vice President of Strategic Planning in 1987. The next year, she participated in the process that led to the creation of California's regulations designed to promote energy efficiency. She led PG&E into energy restructuring.

Pfannenstiel left PG&E in 2000, becoming an energy consultant, providing advice to companies working in the field of wind power and to local housing authorities about energy use.

On April 20, 2004, Governor of California Arnold Schwarzenegger appointed Pfannenstiel to a four-year term as a member of the California Energy Commission, a board with responsibility for power plant licensing, building and appliance efficiency standards, and energy policy development. She became Chair of the Commission in June 2006. Her term on the Commission expired in January 2009.

President of the United States Barack Obama nominated Pfannenstiel as Assistant Secretary of the Navy (Installations and Environment). After Senate confirmation, she assumed the office on March 5, 2010.

In 2013, Pfannenstiel co-founded Advanced Microgrid Systems (AMS) with Susan Kennedy, CEO AMS, former regulator on the California Public Utilities Commission, and former California Governor Arnold Schwarzenegger's Chief of Staff. According to the company's website AMS uses energy storage, data analytics, and software control to operate a fleet of energy storage systems for large scale applications in electricity grid management. AMS is one of the early providers of utility scale energy storage, receiving a contract for 50 megawatt-hours of storage from utility Southern California Edison in July, 2015.

== Death ==
Pfannenstiel died in Piedmont, California, on April 26, 2017, at the age of 69 from breast cancer.

== See also ==
- United States Secretary of the Navy

Government offices
Preceded by B. J. Penn; Roger M. Natsuhara (acting)	Assistant Secretary of the Navy (Installations and Environment); March 5, 2010 – July 2012	Succeeded by Dennis V. McGinn
