= Jacqueline E. Schafer =

American government official (born 1945)

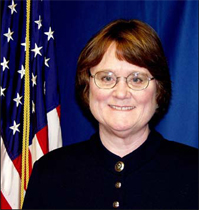
Jacqueline E. Schafer

Jacqueline Ellen Schafer (born October 12, 1945) was the first United States Assistant Secretary of the Navy (Installations and Environment), holding office from 1990 to 1992.

== Biography ==
Schafer was born in Greenport, New York on October 12, 1945. She was educated at Middlebury College, receiving an A.B. in economics in June 1967. Schafer continued her education by taking evening classes at the New York University Graduate School of Business for a year.

Upon graduation from Middlebury College, Schafer went to work for the Federal Reserve Bank of New York as a banking studies analyst and research assistant. In 1970, she left the Federal Reserve Bank of New York to work as the assistant to the director of research on the political campaign of James L. Buckley of the Conservative Party of New York State to be United States Senator from New York. After the campaign, Schafer moved to Washington, D.C. to become a legislative aide for Senator Buckley. As legislative aide, she played a role in drafting the Noise Control Act of 1972 and the Safe Drinking Water Act of 1974. When Senator Buckley failed to win re-election in 1976, she became a member of the professional staff of the United States Senate Committee on Environment and Public Works, working for Senator Robert Stafford (R–Vermont) and the Republicans on the committee. During this period, she worked on the Clean Water Act of 1977. From January 1981, she was responsible for coordinating all of the committee's work related to the Congressional Budget and Impoundment Control Act of 1974.

On February 23, 1982, Administrator of the Environmental Protection Agency Anne M. Gorsuch announced that she was appointing Schafer as Regional Administrator of the United States Environmental Protection Agency's Region II, which contains New York, New Jersey, Puerto Rico, and the U.S. Virgin Islands. She held this job until April 1984, when President of the United States Ronald Reagan appointed her as a member of the Council on Environmental Quality.

On January 29, 1990, President George H. W. Bush nominated Schafer as the first-ever Assistant Secretary of the Navy (Installations and Environment). As such, she was responsible for acquiring and disposing of the United States Department of the Navy's real property; constructing and maintaining all US naval installations; overseeing occupational health and safety issues for all Navy personnel (military and civilian); overseeing the Navy's environmental protection, planning, and restoration efforts; and overseeing the Navy's efforts to conserve cultural and natural resources. She held the office until 1992.

After leaving office, Schafer relocated to California, and between 1993 and 1999, she served as Director of the California Department of Fish and Game, Chairwoman of the California Air Resources Board, and in the office of California Governor Pete Wilson.

After Governor Wilson left office, Schafer joined the cabinet of Arizona Governor Jane Dee Hull as Director of the Arizona Department of Environmental Quality.

In September 2002, she joined the United States Agency for International Development as Deputy Assistant Administrator of USAID's Bureau for Economic Growth, Agriculture, and Trade. In 2005, President George W. Bush nominated Schafer as Assistant Administrator for the Bureau for Economic Growth, Agriculture and Trade, and, after being confirmed by the United States Senate, Schafer was sworn in on November 1, 2005.

She served as a Trustee to the Philadelphia Society from 1989 to 1992 and 2010 to 2013.

Government offices
| Preceded by New Office | Assistant Secretary of the Navy (Installations and Environment); 1990 – 1992 | Succeeded by Robert B. Pirie, Jr. |
