= International Renewable Energy Agency =

International organization

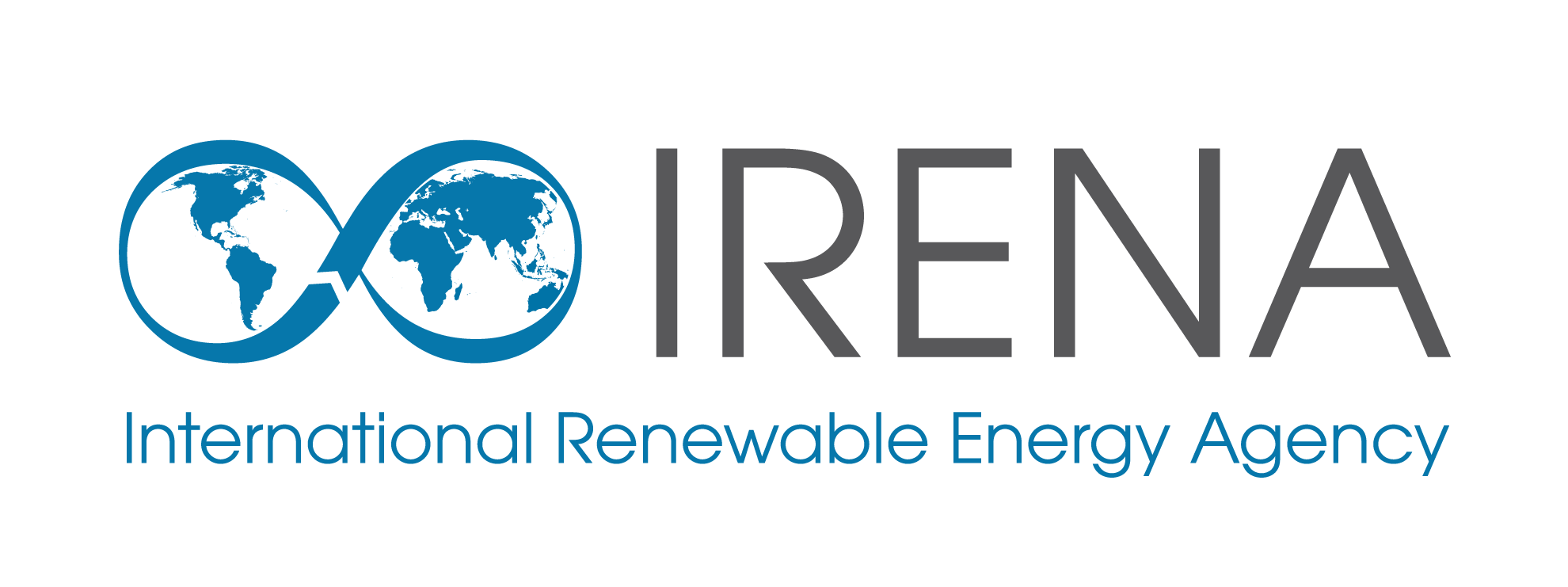

- (Green) Countries which have ratified the IRENA (Light-blue) Countries which have signed, but not yet ratified the IRENA
- Formation: 26 January 2009; 17 years ago
- Type: International organization
- Legal status: Treaty organization
- Purpose: Promotion of renewable energy
- Headquarters: Masdar City, United Arab Emirates
- Location: Abu Dhabi
- Members: 169 states and the European Union (2025)
- Director-General: Francesco La Camera
- Main organ: Assembly
- Budget: $55 million (2022)
- Website: irena.org

The International Renewable Energy Agency (IRENA) is an intergovernmental organization mandated to facilitate cooperation, advance knowledge, and promote the adoption and sustainable use of renewable energy. It is the first international organization to focus exclusively on renewable energy, addressing needs in both industrialized and developing countries. It was founded in 2009, and its statute entered into force on 8 July 2010. The agency is headquartered in Masdar City, Abu Dhabi. The Director-General of IRENA is Francesco La Camera, a national of Italy. IRENA is an official United Nations observer.

== History ==
The first suggestions for an international renewable agency are based on the 1980 Brandt Report activities. NGOs and industry lobbying groups like Eurosolar, the World Council for Renewable Energy (WCRE) and the World Wind Energy Association (WWEA) have promoted IRENA for several decades. In 1990, the Austrian government of Franz Vranitzky suggested a renewables agency to the UN. One of the drivers was Hermann Scheer, a German politician and lobbyist who was acting as president of EUROSOLAR and chair of WCRE.

On 15 June, at their annual event, the WWEA gave their 2010 World Wind Energy Award to the Founding member States of IRENA. They stated: "The creation of IRENA can be seen as the most important decision ever taken on the global level in favour of renewable energy. The founding of IRENA sent out a very strong signal to the world community that renewable energy will have to play and will play a key role in the future energy supply all over the world. With the Award, WWEA would also like to indicate that WWEA is committed to work closely with IRENA and will continue to give its full support."

Since 1981, several meetings took place to discuss the formation of IRENA. The Preparatory Conference for founding IREA was held on 10 and 11 April 2008 with 54 countries participating. Here, government representatives discussed the objectives, activities, finances, and organizational structure of IRENA. Participants expressed a need to begin a swift transition to a more secure, sustainable renewable energy economy with the assistance of an international body.

The Founding Conference of the International Renewable Energy Agency was held in Bonn, Germany, on 26 January 2009. 75 countries signed the Agency's statute. The statute entered into force on 8 July 2010, 30 days after the 25th country deposited its instrument of ratification. The Founding Conference established the Preparatory Commission for IRENA, which consists of all signatory states.

During the first session of the Preparatory Commission in Bonn on 27 January 2009, the signatory countries adopted criteria and procedures for selecting IRENA's Interim Director-General and its interim headquarters. An Administrative Committee was created to assist the commission in preparing its second session. The Administrative Committee prepared draft proposals for an interim work programme and budget as well as for interim staff regulations and interim financial rules. Nominations for the Interim Director-General and the interim headquarters were submitted by 30 April 2009.

The second session of the Preparatory Commission met in Sharm el-Sheikh, Egypt, on 29–30 June 2009, to elect the Interim Director General and decide the location of IRENA's interim headquarters. It was decided that the interim headquarters will be located in Abu Dhabi, United Arab Emirates. In addition, an innovation and technology center will be located in Bonn, and an office dedicated to liaising with the United Nations and other international institutions will be located in Vienna. Hélène Pelosse was elected as the Interim Director-General. The second session of the Preparatory Commission also adopted an interim work programme and budget as well as interim staff regulations and interim financial rules.

The fourth session of the Preparatory Commission on 24–25 October 2010 in Abu Dhabi appointed Kenyan representative Adnan Amin, Deputy Interim Director-General, to perform functions of Interim Director-General after resignation of Hélène Pelosse. On 4 April 2011, Adnan Amin was sworn in as the first Director-General.

The agency has staged a number of events bringing together member states for interaction on ways and means of furthering renewable energy, and conducted significant research and development into viable solutions for the future. On 8 September 2014, IRENA published a notable report on its works titled REthinking energy, which encouraged "speedier adoption of renewable energy technologies," as "the most feasible route to reduce carbon emissions and avoid catastrophic climate change." The study set out to gauge the global power sector and establish how technological advances, economic growth and climate change are transforming it. "A convergence of social, economic and environmental forces are transforming the global energy system as we know it. But if we continue on the path we are currently on and fuel our growing economies with outmoded ways of thinking and acting, we will not be able to avoid the most serious impacts of climate change," Amin said at a function to release the report.

The Ninth Meeting of International Renewable Energy Agency Council was held on 10–11 June 2015 at Abu Dhabi.

=== International Day of Clean Energy ===
On August 25, 2023, the United Nations General Assembly declared January 26 as the International Day of Clean Energy through resolution A/77/327. This particular date was chosen to coincide with the anniversary of the establishment of the International Renewable Energy Agency (IRENA) in 2009.

== Aims ==
IRENA aims to become the main driving force in promoting a transition towards the use of renewable energy on a global scale:

Acting as the global voice for renewable energies, IRENA will provide practical advice and support for both industrialised and developing countries, help them improve their regulatory frameworks and build capacity. The agency will facilitate access to all relevant information including reliable data on the potential of renewable energy, best practices, effective financial mechanisms and state-of-the-art technological expertise.

IRENA provides advice and support to governments on renewable energy policy, capacity building, and technology transfer. IRENA will also co-ordinate with existing renewable energy organizations, such as REN21.

== Member states ==
The statute to gain IRENA membership requires that a state be a member of the United Nations and to regional intergovernmental economic-integration organizations. States that gain membership to IRENA must uphold the organizations statute to the best of its abilities.

On 9 January 2019, Canada became IRENA's 160th member.

As of July 2022, 168 states and the European Union are members of IRENA, and a further 17 are in the process of accession.

In January 2026, United States President Donald Trump announced that the United States would withdraw from the organization.

== Institutional structure ==
=== The Assembly ===
This assembly is IRENA's main institutional governing body, which includes one delegate from each member state. The assembly meets once yearly to discuss all IRENA management including things such as budget, membership applications and yearly goals. The 9th Assembly took place in January 2019 with the 10th Assembly scheduled for 11–12 January in Abu Dhabi, United Arab Emirates.

=== The Council ===
The IRENA council is composed of 21 elected officials from member states, who each serve for two-year terms and must answer to the assembly. Council members rotate between states to ensure an efficient and fair representation of various member country sizes, geographic location, rates of development and particular concerns. The council deals directly with IRENA matters related to budgeting and annual reports.

=== The Secretariat ===
The Secretariat is the executive branch of IRENA and consists of the Director-General and their staff. The Secretariat acts as oversight to the council and assembly and offers technical support to these governing bodies. The current of Director-General of IRENA is the Italian Francesco La Camera who was appointed to the position during IRENA's Ninth Assembly and assumed office on 4 April 2019.

IRENA's first Director-General was Adnan Z. Amin, a Kenyan national. He was elected to the post in April 2011 and completed a second term that ended April 2019. Afterwards, he was accorded Amin the honorary title of Director-General Emeritus. Along with his work as Secretariat, Amin also served as the Director of the United Nations Environment Programme's (UNEP) at their New York office and as Special Representative of the UNEP Executive Director where he played a crucial role in reviewing international governance and his organizations participation at the World Summit of Sustainable Development. During his time as Director General of IRENA, the organization was involved in the implementation of policies such as the Paris Agreement, the UN 2030 Agenda for Sustainable Development, and the G7 and G20. IRENA's membership also grew to include nearly all countries world-wide.

== United Nations ==
Various UN organisations work in the field of renewable energy. But IRENA is the only one dedicated to the promotion of 100% renewable energy worldwide. IRENA and the UN will join forces to speed up the transformation of the global energy sector.

Hélène Pelosse, former Interim Director General of IRENA, met with UN Secretary General Ban Ki-moon during 2009 Climate week in New York City, and together with Ban explored future fields of cooperation between IRENA and various UN bodies. IRENA also seeks to cooperate with the UN and associated organisations like the United Nations University, UNESCO, the World Bank, GEF, UNIDO, UNDP, UNEP, and WTO in the areas of education and training, financing, access to energy, potential studies and trade.

== Renewable Energy Capacity Statistics ==
The International Renewable Energy Agency (IRENA) compiles and publishes statistics on the net generating capacity of renewable energy sources for electricity production, covering a period since 2013. The agency gathers data through a combination of its own surveys, official national statistics, industry reports, research studies, and various news outlets.

=== 2023 ===
In its March 2024 publication, IRENA highlighted a marked rise in global renewable electricity capacity, with an increase of 473 gigawatts (GW) in 2023. This figure represents 86% of all newly installed power generation capacity during that year. China was the leading contributor to this growth. The report also noted significant developments in solar and wind energy: solar energy capacity expanded by 32.4% to reach 1.42 terawatts (TW), thus overtaking hydropower, while wind energy capacity also achieved a noteworthy milestone by exceeding 1 TW.

=== 2024 ===
In July 2025, IRENA published its 2024 report.

In 2024, global renewable power capacity additions reached 582 gigawatts (GW), representing a 19.8% increase compared to the capacity additions delivered in 2023 and marking the highest annual expansion since records began in 2000. Solar photovoltaics (PV) led this surge, accounting for 452.1 GW (77.8%) of the total, followed by wind, with 114.3 GW. These additions brought the total global installed renewable capacity to 4.44 TW by the end of 2024.

In 2024, Asia added 413.2 GW of renewable capacity – a 24.9% increase that brought the region's total to 2.37 TW. China (PRC) accounted for 61.2% of global PV additions (+ 276.8 GW) and 69.4% of new wind installations (+ 79.4 GW). Also the US, India, Brazil and Germany were some of the notable contributors.

91% of new renewable power projects commissioned in 2024 were more cost-effective than any fossil fuel-fired alternative.

IRENA has emphasized in its papers, speeches and press releases that the global goal is to triple the utilization of renewable energy sources and achieve a total capacity of 11.2 terawatts by 2030. This entails the annual addition of an average of 1.04 TW of new renewable energy capacity. This action would cut carbon dioxide emissions by 43 percent by 2030 and 60 percent by 2035.

=== 2026 ===
The 2026 report found that renewables accounted for 85.6% of new electricity generation capacity globally in 2025, 692 GW, with PV providing nearly three-quarters of the increase. At the end of 2025, renewables constituted 49.4% of global installed electricity generating capacity. However 2025 also saw non-renewable additions nearly doubling compared to 2024, with AI data center builds accounting for much of that growth.

== See also ==
- American Council on Renewable Energy (ACORE)
- Energy development
- Energy Sector Management Assistance Program (ESMAP)
- International Energy Agency
- International Partnership for Energy Efficiency Cooperation
- International Renewable Energy Conference
- Hans Jørgen Koch
- Lists about renewable energy
- REEEP
- Renewable energy commercialization
- Renewable energy in the European Union
- Renewable Energy Sources and Climate Change Mitigation
- Repower America
- Solar Energy Industries Association (SEIA)
- United Nations Environment Organization
