= Assistant Secretary of the Navy (Energy, Installations and Environment) =

United States Navy official

Assistant Secretary of the Navy for Energy, Installations and Environment
- Seal of the Department of the Navy

- Incumbent; Brendan P. Rogers since December 23, 2025
- Style: Mrs. Secretary; The Honorable (formal address in writing)
- Reports to: Secretary of the Navy; Under Secretary of the Navy
- Seat: The Pentagon, Arlington County, Virginia, United States
- Nominator: The president with Senate advice and consent
- Term length: No fixed term
- Constituting instrument: 10. U.S.C. § 8016
- Formation: 1990
- First holder: Jacqueline E. Schafer
- Succession: 18th in SecDef succession by seniority of appointment
- Salary: Executive Schedule, Level IV
- Website: Official website

Assistant Secretary of the Navy (Energy, Installations and Environment) (abbreviated ASN(EI&E)) is a civilian office in the United States Navy established in 1990. The assistant secretary of the Navy (energy, installations and environment) reports to the under secretary of the Navy, who in turn reports to the secretary.

The assistant secretary of the Navy (energy, installations and environment) is responsible for greater energy security, acquiring and disposing of the Navy's real property; constructing and maintaining all US naval installations; overseeing occupational health and safety issues for all navy personnel (military and civilian); overseeing the Navy's environmental protection, planning, and restoration efforts; and overseeing the Navy's efforts to conserve cultural and natural resources.

== List of deputy assistant secretaries reporting to the assistant secretary of the Navy (energy, installations and environment) ==
- Principal Deputy Assistant Secretary of the Navy (Energy, Installations and Environment) – PDASN (EI&E)
- Deputy Assistant Secretary of the Navy (Installations, Energy & Facilities) – DASN (IE&F)
- Deputy Assistant Secretary of the Navy (Environment) – DASN (E)
- Deputy Assistant Secretary of the Navy (Safety) – DASN (Safety)
- Assistant General Counsel of the Navy (Energy, Installations and Environment) – AGC (EI&E)
- Executive Director, Public Private Partnership Reviews

== Assistant secretaries of the Navy (energy, installations & environment), 1990—present ==
Name	Assumed office	Left office	President appointed by	Secretary served under
Assistant Secretaries of the Navy (Installations & Environment)
Jacqueline E. Schafer	1990	1992	George H. W. Bush	Henry L. Garrett III
Frederick S. Sterns (acting)	1993	1994	Bill Clinton	J. Daniel Howard (acting); Frank Kelso (acting)
Robert B. Pirie Jr.	March 1994	October 12, 2000	Bill Clinton	John Howard Dalton; Richard Danzig
Duncan Holaday (acting)	January 20, 2001	August 7, 2001	George W. Bush	Gordon R. England
Hansford T. Johnson	August 7, 2001	March 1, 2005	George W. Bush	Gordon R. England
B. J. Penn	March 1, 2005	March 13, 2009	George W. Bush	Gordon R. England; Donald C. Winter
Roger M. Natsuhara (acting)	August 2009	March 5, 2010	Barack Obama	Ray Mabus
Assistant Secretaries of the Navy (Energy, Installations & Environment)
Jackalyne Pfannenstiel	March 5, 2010	July 2012	Barack Obama	Ray Mabus
Dennis V. McGinn	September 3, 2013	January 20, 2017	Barack Obama	Ray Mabus
Steve Iselin (acting)	January 20, 2017	February 20, 2018	Donald Trump	Sean Stackley (acting); Richard V. Spencer
Phyllis L. Bayer	February 20, 2018	March 30, 2019	Donald Trump	Richard V. Spencer
Todd C. Mellon (acting)	March 30, 2019	June 26, 2019	Donald Trump	Richard V. Spencer
Lucian Niemeyer (acting)	June 26, 2019	April 24, 2020	Donald Trump	Richard V. Spencer; Thomas Modly (acting)
Charles A. Williams	April 24, 2020	January 20, 2021	Donald Trump	Thomas Modly (acting); James McPherson (acting); Kenneth Braithwaite
Todd L. Schafer (acting)	January 20, 2021	August 5, 2021	Joe Biden	Thomas Harker (acting)
Meredith Berger	August 5, 2021	January 20, 2025	Joe Biden	Carlos Del Toro
Peter S. Lynch (acting)	January 20, 2025	March 31, 2025	Donald Trump	Terence G. Emmert (acting); John Phelan
Brenda M. Johnson-Turner (acting)	March 31, 2025	July 22, 2025	Donald Trump	John Phelan
Elmer Román (acting)	July 22, 2025	December 23, 2025	Donald Trump	John Phelan
Brendan P. Rogers	December 23, 2025	Present	Donald Trump	John Phelan; Hung Cao (acting)
