= Tetsunari Iida =

Japanese energy activist

Tesunari Iida 飯田哲也
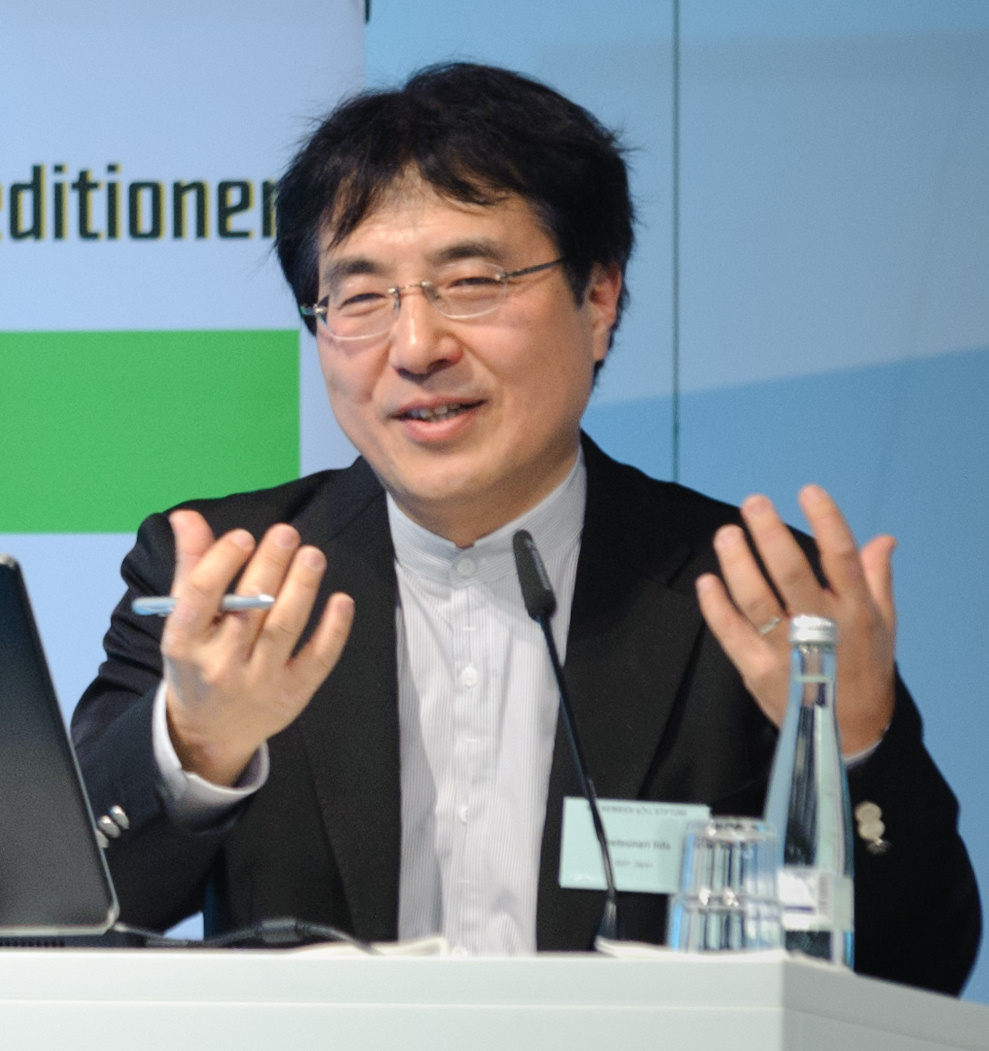
- Tetsunari Iida in 2011
- Born: January 8, 1959 (age 66); Shūnan, Yamaguchi, Japan

Tetsunari Iida (飯田 哲也, Iida Tetsunari; born 1959, Yamaguchi Prefecture, Japan) is director of the Institute for Sustainable Energy Policies in Japan. Following the Fukushima nuclear disaster, he is calling for a decrease in Japan's reliance on nuclear power and an increase in renewable energy use.

Iida started his career as a nuclear engineer, but he quit in 1992, and went to study renewable energy in Sweden. In September 2011, Iida launched the Japan Renewable Energy Foundation, which is backed by ¥1 billion (US$13 million) from Japan's richest man, Masayoshi Son.

Solar power in Japan has been expanding since the late 1990s. The country is a leading manufacturer of photovoltaics (PV) and a large installer of domestic PV systems with most of them grid connected.

== Biography ==
Iida started his career as a nuclear engineer, but he quit in 1992, and went to study renewable energy in Sweden. When he returned to Japan in 1998, he formed the Institute for Sustainable Energy Policies. Since then he has set up several green mutual funds.

In September 2011, Iida launched the Japan Renewable Energy Foundation, which is backed by ¥1 billion (US$13 million) from Japan's richest man, Masayoshi Son. The foundation will bring together some 100 experts from around the world to analyse obstacles to implementing renewable energy, and offer policy recommendations to the new Japanese government.

== See also ==
- Eric Martinot
- Amory Lovins
- Renewable energy commercialization
