= Strike Fighter Weapons School Pacific =

Strike Fighter Weapons School Pacific (SFWSPAC) is the Pacific Fleet Strike Fighter School which duty is to safely teach graduate level tactics, techniques and procedures to Pacific Fleet Strike Fighter squadrons, it is based at NAS Lemoore, California. Its Atlantic Fleet equivalent is Strike Fighter Weapons School Atlantic which is based at NAS Oceana, Virginia.

== History ==
SFWSPAC was established on October 15, 1973, at Naval Air Station Lemoore as Light Attack Weapons School, Pacific (LAWSPAC). In reality, the history of the school dates back ten years when the Weapons Training Center was established under the co-management of Attack Squadron 122 (today VFA-122) and Attack Squadron 125 (today VFA-125). When the A-7 Corsair II came into service and the intensified tempo of fleet operations and its training requirements expanded, Weapons Training Center was moved to Commander Fleet Air Lemoore (presently Commander, Strike Fighter Wing, US Pacific Fleet). Due to the sophistication in attack weaponry and delivery systems, LAWSPAC was formed as a parallel training component within Weapons Training Center, which was devoted to train Weapons Training Officers.

Soon, the Chief of Naval Operations recognized the need for postgraduate weapons training and expressed the desire to create a commissioned unit, the stated goal was that “eventually all pilots and every career aviator should have special training in weapons." Commander, Light Attack Wing, US Pacific Fleet, commissioned the Weapons Training Center as LAWSPAC, a permanently shored based command at NAS Lemoore. On July 1, 1988, LAWSPAC was redesignated to Strike Fighter Weapons School, Pacific due to the expanded growth of F/A-18 units in the Navy. In August 1996, the Intelligence Department of the Strike Fighter Wing Pacific was incorporated into SFWSPAC to enhance the strike planning and support training for fleet squadrons.

Today, SFWSPAC is dedicated to provide standardized graduate level training of F/A-18 weapons employment and dedicated to guaranteeing the combat readiness of the Strike Fighter Community by providing the best possible training in mission planning, tactics, weapons systems and ordnance handling. Thirty weapons and tactics courses for strike fighter aircraft are taught on a continuing basis. The total amount of ordnance uploaded in courses totals over 2 ½ million pounds annually.

Currently SFWSPAC is staffed with 23 officers, 29 enlisted personnel and 7 civilians.
