= Roger M. Natsuhara =

American government official

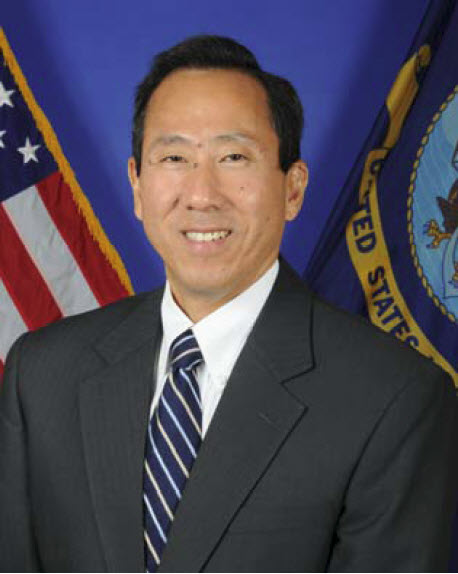
Roger M. Natsuhara

Roger M. Natsuhara was the acting United States Assistant Secretary of the Navy (Installations and Environment).

== Biography ==
Roger M. Natsuhara was born in Stockton, California. He was educated at the University of California, Berkeley, receiving a B.S. in civil engineering.

Upon graduating, Natsuhara took a job as an engineer with Boeing in Renton, Washington. He was a senior engineer on the Boeing 757 Flight Test Integration Group.

In 1982, Natsuhara attended Officer Candidate School at Naval Station Newport and was commissioned as an ensign in the United States Navy. His first posting was as a Surface Warfare Officer on the USS Harold E. Holt (FF-1074). During this assignment, he was selected to become a member of the Civil Engineer Corps, and he would spend the next 22 years as an engineer with the Civil Engineer Corps.

After retiring from the Navy at the rank of captain, Natsuhara attended the Executive Program at the Ross School of Business in 2003. He then took a job at the Battelle Memorial Institute as Navy Market Sector Senior Market Manager. He later joined the National Oceanic and Atmospheric Administration as Director of the Real Property, Facilities and Logistics Office.

In August 2009, Natsuhara was appointed Principal Deputy Assistant Secretary of the Navy (Installations and Environment). Since the office of Assistant Secretary of the Navy (Installations and Environment) was unfilled, he was the acting Assistant Secretary of the Navy (Installations and Environment) until March 5, 2010, at which time Jackalyne Pfannenstiel assumed office.

Government offices
| Preceded by B. J. Penn | Assistant Secretary of the Navy (Installations and Environment) (acting); August 2009 – March 5, 2010 | Succeeded by Jackalyne Pfannenstiel |
