= International Renewable Energy Conference =

The International Renewable Energy Conference (IREC) is a meeting of senior-level representatives, such as those from the Executive and Legislative branches of national or sub-national governments, international organizations, the finance and business community, or civil societies, working towards the advancement and integration of renewable energy in their countries.

== History ==
Initiated at the Renewables 2004 conference in Bonn, Germany, IREC is a high-level political conference series dedicated to renewable energy policy worldwide. Dedicated exclusively to the renewable energy sector, IRECs are hosted by alternate Governments every two years and convened by REN21.

One of the major accomplishments of the 2002 World Summit on Sustainable Development (WSSD) in Johannesburg, South Africa, was the recognition that renewable energy is a critical component of sustainable development, energy security, climate change, and air quality.

Worldwide enthusiasm for renewable energy has increased dramatically since WSSD.

The 2005 conference was held at the Great Hall of the People in Beijing from 7–8 November 2005. The conference called the world to consider renewable energy alternatives in a time of high oil prices.

=== Washington ===
The Washington International Renewable Energy Conference (WIREC 2008) was held March 4–6, 2008.

=== New Delhi ===
The Delhi International Renewable Energy Conference (DIREC 2010) was held October 27–29, 2010, in New Delhi, India.

=== Abu Dhabi ===
The Abu Dhabi Renewable Energy Conference (ADIREC) was held in Abu Dhabi in January 2013. In a declaration, participants called for the world's shares of renewable energy to double by 2030 under the leadership of the International Renewable Energy Agency (IRENA).

=== South Africa ===
In October 2015, South Africa became the sixth country, and the first in Africa, to host the International Renewable Energy Conference (IREC). The South African International Renewable Energy Conference – SAIREC 2015 – provided a global platform for government ministers, high-level decision makers, experts, specialists and thought leaders, as well as private sector players and civil society, to discuss and exchange their vision, experiences and solutions to accelerate the global scale-up of renewable energy.

From October 4–7, South Africa welcomed 3,600 delegates from more than 80 countries.

This international event comprised 24 conference sessions featuring more than 150 speakers, 41 side events, 35 technical site visits and 56 exhibitors, providing extensive opportunities for delegates to discuss, learn and network.

SAIREC established a platform for discussions on energy security and access. Under the theme of Re-Energizing Africa, SAIREC outlined Africa's development potential for the renewables energy sector. It also provided Africa with a opportunities to present its emerging renewable energy industry and learn from proven practices implemented by nations with mature renewable energy deployment systems.

In parallel REN21 launched the SADC Renewable Energy and Energy Efficiency Status Report, which provides a comprehensive overview of the status of renewable energy and energy efficiency in the region. It covers the 15 SADC countries: Angola, Botswana, the Democratic Republic of the Congo (DRC), Lesotho, Madagascar, Malawi, Mauritius, Mozambique, Namibia, Seychelles, South Africa, Swaziland, United Republic of Tanzania, Zambia and Zimbabwe.

The report is available for download on the REN21 website along with a series of infographics. SAIREC was co-hosted by South Africa's Department of Energy together with the South African National Energy Development Institute (SANEDI), under the leadership of the Minister of Energy, Honorable Ms Tina Joemat-Pettersson (MP), with REN21 and with the final support of the German Federal Ministry for Economic Cooperation and Development, GIZ. See the REN21 website for the conference report, full Declaration text, and photos

=== Mexico City ===
The renewable energy community came together in Mexico City mid-September under the banner of the International Renewable Energy Conference (IREC).

The Mexico International Renewable Energy Conference (MEXIREC) was the 7th in this conference series, continuing the tradition of convening government and non-state actors around the development of renewable energy policy.

MEXIREC's agenda was designed to encourage a systems approach to energy where the generation and use of renewable energy are analysed from an integrated and multifaceted perspective. The conference demonstrated how this diversification is occurring, not only in Latin American and the Caribbean but elsewhere in the world.

Over the course of two days, more than 1,600 delegates participated in talks and presentations that revolved around five thematic areas: Policy and Finance; Electricity Sector and Infrastructure; Heating and Cooling/Transport; Energy Access/Local Value Creation; and Technology Innovations. The presence and active participation of young professionals and women was particularly encouraging. It ended with presentation and acceptance of the Conference Declaration.

In parallel a new report, Renewable Energy Tenders and Community Empowerment: Latin America and the Caribbean was launched. The bi-lingual report (English/Spanish) examines both the rise of tendering and community power projects in the region and proposes an accession process to reconcile the tension between maximising economic returns and social impact.

MEXIREC was the leading event of the “Dialogues for the Future of Energy, Mexico 2017” (DEMEX). It was held September 11–13, 2017 at the Expo Santa Fe Convention Center, Mexico City and co-organized by SENER and REN21 will the support of the German government. See the REN21 website for the conference report, full Declaration text, photos and much more.

IREC 2023 will be held in Madrid. Spain's ambition to become a clean and renewable country has piqued the interest of the IREC.

=== Official Side Events ===
Official Side Events are a forum for non-governmental, governmental, and/or inter-governmental partners to showcase their projects/programs in front of a high level public and private sector audience.

== See also ==
- International Renewable Energy Agency
- Lists about renewable energy
