= Hans Jørgen Koch =

Danish energy official

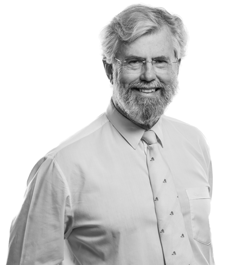
Hans Jørgen Koch

Hans Jørgen Koch is the former head of Nordic Energy Research, a platform under the auspices of the Nordic Council of Ministers.

In the periods 1982–1994 and 2002–2014, Koch worked in the ministries responsible for energy issues in Denmark. He was director general, deputy permanent secretary of state, and several times acting minister. He was chairman of the Energy Committee of the Nordic Council of Ministers. In 1983–1994, Koch was governor in the International Atomic Energy Agency. In 1990–1994, he was chairman of the Committee on Research and Technology of the International Energy Agency. In 1994–2002, Koch was director on energy efficiency, renewable energy and research, development and deployment in the IEA. After returning to Denmark he was a member of the Governing Board of the International Energy Agency. In 2014, he was chairman of the committee on renewable energy of the IEA.

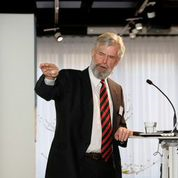
Hans Jørgen Koch presenting

Hans Jørgen Koch was the Vice Chairman of the intergovernmental final preparatory conference for the International Renewable Energy Agency (IRENA) held in Madrid in 23–24 October 2008 and the founding conference held in Bonn on 26 January 2009. He was also a candidate for Director General of IRENA.

Since 2014, he is executive director of Nordic Energy Research.
