= Reegle =

Internet search engine

reegle
- Website type: Search engine
- Available in: English
- Headquarters: Vienna, Austria
- Owners: REEEP & REN21
- Revenue: Nonprofit organization
- Commercial: no
- Launched: July 2006; 20 years ago
- Current status: Defunct

reegle (lower-case) was a search engine specifically covering the fields of renewable energy, efficient energy use, and climate change issues. It was developed in 2005 by REEEP and REN21, with funding from several European government agencies. At one point, it had 220,000 visitors per month.

It was launched in July 2006.

It was conceived as a public resource for governments, project developers, banks and finance institutions, NGOs, and international organisations as well as the general public. The central function of the site was a search engine, which offered a "mind map" based search refinement function. Users were able to click on a map of the world and get information on renewable energy and energy efficiency in that specific country, including relevant government ministries, private companies, country energy statistics, and a sampling of clean energy development projects in that specific area. The website offered an online glossary covering about 4,000 terms from the clean energy and climate sector, with definitions from Open Data sources. Translations of many terms into additional languages was also available. As of 2021, the portal is no longer active.

== See also ==
- British Department for Environment, Food and Rural Affairs (Defra)
- Dutch Ministry of Housing, Spatial Planning and the Environment (VROM)
- International Energy Agency (IEA)
- Open energy system databases – database projects which collect, clean, and republish energy-related datasets
- OpenEI – a US website publishing open energy data
- Renewable energy commercialization
- Renewable Energy and Energy Efficiency Partnership (REEEP)
- Renewable Energy Policy Network for the 21st Century (REN21)
