= United Nations Environment Organization =

Proposals for the creation of a United Nations Environmental Organization (UNEO) have come as some question the efficacy of the current United Nations Environment Programme (UNEP) at dealing with the scope of global environmental issues. Created to act as an anchor institution in the system of Global Environmental Governance (GEG), it has failed to meet those demands. The UNEP has been hindered by its title as a Programme as opposed to a specialized agency like the United Nations Educational, Scientific and Cultural Organization (UNESCO) or the World Health Organization (WHO), in addition to a lack of voluntary funding, and a location removed from the centers of political power, in Nairobi, Kenya. These factors have led to widespread calls for UNEP reform, and following the publication of Fourth Assessment Report of the IPCC in February 2007, a "Paris Call for Action" read out by French President Chirac and supported by 46 countries, called for the UNEP to be replaced by a new and more powerful United Nations Environment Organization, to be modelled on the World Health Organization. The 52 countries included the European Union nations, but notably did not include the United States and the BRIC countries (Brazil, Russia, India, and China), the top five emitters of greenhouse gases.

== UNEP Limiting Factors ==
A number of factors have limited the UNEP's ability to fulfill its mandate.

=== Designation as a Programme ===
The decision to establish the UNEP as a program as opposed to a Specialized Agency like the WHO has had enormous implications for UNEP's performance. "In the UN hierarchy, Programmes have the least independence and authority," and this has made it difficult for UNEP to establish authority over subsequent UN bodies dealing with the environment. Additionally, "born out of a General Assembly Resolution, its mandate was limited and deprived of any implementing powers".

=== Location ===
The UNEP has been handicapped by its location in Nairobi, Kenya. The first UN body headquartered in the Global South, the move was meant to ease tensions between the developed and developing world. However, its location in Kenya has led to an isolation from other international environmental power structures, as well as a "physical fragmentation of the governance structure" due to its removal from other UN bodies headquartered in Geneva and New York City.

=== Funding ===
Many of UNEP's struggles can be traced back to a lack of funding, and that lack of funding can be traced back to the UNEP's unique funding system. Unlike other international organizations, the UNEP does not have mandatory assessments but instead is reliant on the voluntary contributions of UN member states. "UNEP's unreliable and highly discretionary financial arrangement compromises the financial stability of the organization, its ability to plan beyond the current budget cycle, and its autonomy" as well as making the UNEP too dependent on certain member states which then hold undue influence in UNEP agenda setting.

== UNEP's Failure as an Anchor Institution ==
The UNEP was created to perform the tasks of an anchor institution in the system of Global Environmental Governance (GEG). According to the Nairobi Declaration on the Role and Mandate of the United Nations Environmental program, "the role of UNEP was to be the leading global environmental authority that sets the global environmental agenda, promotes the coherent implementation of the Environmental dimension of sustainable development within the UN system, and serves as an authoritative advocate for the global environment". Maria Ivanova, Director of the Global Environmental Governance Project at the Yale Center for Environmental Law and Policy, writes in a working paper entitled Assessing UNEP as Anchor Institution for the Global Environment: Lessons for the UNEO Debate that "anchor institutions are the primary, though not the only, international organizations in certain global issue areas and typically perform three core functions: 1) overseeing monitoring, assessment, and reporting on the state of the issue in their purview; 2) setting an agenda for action and advancing standards, policies, and guidelines; and 3) developing institutional capacity to address existing and emerging problems." However, while the UNEP was chartered to perform these three primary tasks, it has failed in many ways:

=== Monitoring, assessment and reporting ===
The UNEP has had the most success in the areas of monitoring, assessment, and reporting; it is thought to do relatively well in the arena of global environmental assessment (GEA), and publishes the Global Environment Outlook (GEO) reports. However, it fails to analyze environmental issues at the state level, and responsibility for monitoring, assessment, and reporting is allocated to all eight divisions of UNEP, creating redundancies. Additionally, the UNEP system of reporting is disorganized and difficult to access. "The public cannot use UNEP's publications and benefit from the organization's work to the fullest due to the lack of a single easily accessible, searchable, and sortable database or catalogue of publications".

=== Agenda Setting ===
"Another important function critical to the effectiveness of an anchor institution is agenda setting and management of intergovernmental processes to gain agreement on standards, policies, and guidelines or even just serving as the central forum for deliberation and debate." While UNEP has had considerable success in the creation of treaties and multilateral environmental agreements (the Basel Convention on the Transboundary Movement of Hazardous Wastes, the Convention on Biological Diversity, the Montreal Protocol on the Protection of the Ozone Layer, etc.), it has struggled to coordinate the efforts of the numerous international environmental regulatory bodies after their inception. "UNEP has not succeeded in becoming the central forum for debate and deliberation in the environmental field, like the WTO for trade or the WHO for health." This lack of a central coordinating authority has led to an erosion in the efficacy of Global Environmental Governance. "UNEP has not been able to fulfill its coordination mandate effectively in its two key areas of responsibility (1) coordination of multilateral environmental agreements and (2) coordination of the environmental activities of other international organizations".

=== Capacity Development ===
The UNEP has struggled to establish its role in the International system and this has led to it also having difficulty in Capacity Development (defined by Ivanova as Education and Training, Financing, Technical Assistance, and Institution and Network Building). The UNEP mandate calls for the UNEP to play a primarily normative role in GEG, however, "the organization now views implementation as its primary strategy." This shift has been necessitated by a desire from states for fewer treaties and more concrete action and the need for the UNEP to provide tangible results for potential governmental and private sources of funding, upon which the UNEP is dependent. However, in moving away from a normative role, the UNEP has moved away from its strengths: "information provision, development of common norms and principles, and institutional capacity development".

== Creation of a United Nations Environmental Organization ==
After the 58th meeting of the UN General Assembly, a proposal was made by the member states of the European Union to transform the UNEP into the United Nations Environmental Organization. In 2007 at UNEP's Governing Council meeting, the EU repeated its call for a "significant strengthening of UNEP, along the lines sketched out in Cartagena as well as in the recent announcements of the Executive Director, which will help UNEP to become more effective in catalyzing action to address major environmental threats" and "that an upgrade of UNEP into a UNEO, with stable, adequate and predictable resources and with the appropriate international standing, would enable the organization to fully fulfill its mandate and to live up to the expectations of developed and developing countries". Proponents of a UNEO argue that it would play a vital role in increasing the political importance of environmental issues in the UN, and could therefore play a vital role in solving the many environmental challenges the earth currently faces. Specifics of a UNEO would need to be worked out by the international community, but certain basic aspects of a UNEO would likely include

=== Specialized Agency Status ===
While still working within the UN system and reporting to ECOSOC, designation as a specialized agency would allow UNEO to "enjoy budgetary autonomy" and "determine most details of their programming." Additionally, creation of a UNEO would not require consensus among the members of the UN, and "membership in a UNEO and the UN could differ".

=== UNEO Structure ===
As with other Specialized Agencies, the institutional structure of a UNEO would consist of a plenary body, an executive organ, and a secretariat. Proponents of a UNEO suggest that a UNEO plenary body would "elect the members of the executive organ, appoint the Director General and approve the budget and work programme." The plenary body would also likely include a wide range of observers from other international organizations to non-governmental organizations and representatives of civil society. Specialized agencies have an executive organ which ensures that the agency achieves its operational goals and manages the budget. A UNEO executive organ is likely to "prepare the budget and work programme of the UNEO." The Secretariat would "as the focal point for all the agency's activities," however there is considerable variety in the organization of the Secretariats of various Specialized Agencies.

=== UNEO Purpose and Tasks ===
The exact mandate and function of a UNEO would be determined by the states involved, but they are likely to be similar to those of the UNEP. "It has been argued that a UNEO should help to systematically pool the scientific knowledge on environmental issues and help to define global environmental strategic guidelines to promote coordination and synergies." However, unlike other specialized agencies like the WTO, it would not have the power to adjudicate environmental disputes. Proponents suggest that a UNEO could serve as an umbrella organization, helping to coordinate the "over 500 multilateral environment agreements (MEA) and numerous international organizations and fora dealing in an uncoordinated way with the environment" and make them more efficient and less redundant.

=== UNEO Funding ===
A UNEO would likely rely on assessed contributions, which would alleviate UNEP problems that stem from a reliance on voluntary contributions. As a specialized agency, a UNEO would be able to determine the assessment scales of members separately from the UN general budget. Voluntary contributions would likely be used for specific projects, but assessed contributions would pay for the operating budget of a UNEO.

=== Opposition ===
While the number of countries who favor the creation of a UNEO has grown, there remain fears among many states that the creation of a UNEO would "favor environmental policies to the detriment of other policies, notably economic development and, thus, poverty eradication." Some states also feel that the UNEP should first be strengthened and given time to improve international environmental governance before a UNEO is created.

=== Prospects ===
There is a consensus among policy-makers that UNEP needs to be strengthened, and "in November 2006, the Secretary-General's High-level Panel on UN System-wide Coherence in the Areas of Development, Humanitarian Assistance, and the Environment recommended that 'UNEP should be upgraded and have real authority as the environmental policy pillar of the UN system'". And while disagreement remains over whether the creation of a UNEO is necessary, according to a French embassy statement, support is growing. "Following the Paris Call for Action, the Group of Friends of the UNEO was set up and now has 52 States, bringing together, besides the European Union, countries from every geographical area", and many hope that a new administration in the United States will make the creation of a UNEO more likely.

== See also ==
- Global warming
- International Renewable Energy Agency (IRENA)
- Reform of the United Nations
- United Nations Environment Programme
- United Nations Parliamentary Assembly
