= Johannesburg Renewable Energy Coalition =

The Johannesburg Renewable Energy Coalition, also known as JREC, is the group of countries supporting the Declaration on The Way Forward on Renewable Energy (also known as the JREC Declaration), made at the World Summit on Sustainable Development in Johannesburg, South Africa, in September 2002. The JREC is co-chaired by the European Commission and the Government of Morocco.

== See also ==
- Renewable energy
