= Adnan Z. Amin =

Kenyan development economist, international civil servant and diplomat

1st Director-General of the IRENA
- In office 4 April 2011 – 4 April 2019
- Preceded by: New Position
- Succeeded by: Francesco La Camera

Personal details
- Born: 1957 (age 68–69) Kenya
- Education: University of Sussex

Adnan Z. Amin (born 1957) is a Kenyan diplomat and a development economist with a specialty in sustainable development. He served as the first Director-General of the Abu Dhabi–based intergovernmental organisation, the International Renewable Energy Agency (IRENA). Amin was elected in April 2011, having previously served as the Agency's Interim Director-General in 2010. Prior to his appointment at the IRENA, he worked in a variety of senior positions within the United Nations system in areas relating to in renewable energy, sustainable development and environmental policy. He served as the director of the New York Office of United Nations Environment Programme (UNEP) and Special Representative of the UNEP Executive Director.

== Early life and education ==
Adnan Z. Amin was born in Kenya in 1957. He attended the University of Sussex where he received a master's degree in development studies.

== Career ==
=== United Nations ===
In his three-decade career, Amin was the head of the UN System Chief Executives Board for Coordination (CEB) Secretariat. In this role, he spearheaded oversight in the Secretariat supporting the CEB in its UN system-wide policy co-ordination under the UN Secretary-General and comprising the executive heads of UN System organisations, during a period characterized by the roll-out of initiatives on climate change and the 2008 financial crisis. He was the head of the Secretariat for the UN Secretary-General's High-level Panel on UN System-wide Coherence relating to development, environment and humanitarian assistance during the administrations of Kofi Annan and Ban Ki-moon. During his tenure, the UN bureaucracy was reformed under the “One UN” and “Delivering as One” module, proposed by a panel of consultants. Earlier, Adnan Amin was the director of the United Nations Environment Programme's (UNEP) New York Office, and as special representative of the UNEP executive director. At the UNEP, he was instrumental in the ministerial-level intergovernmental process to review International Environmental Governance and UNEP's participation in the 2002 World Summit on Sustainable Development.

=== IRENA ===
At IRENA, Amin led efforts to make the Agency a worldwide authority on renewables and cleantech. Country membership at IRENA is almost at near-universal level. During his tenure, the Agency had 160 Members (159 States and the European Union) and an additional 23 states in accession, providing support to countries in their transition to a sustainable energy future through the adoption of practices, policies, technologies, resources and financial knowledge relating to the achievement of sustainable development, energy access, energy security and low-carbon economic growth and prosperity. Under Amin's leadership, the IRENA became a core patron in the implantation process for the Paris Agreement, the UN 2030 Agenda for Sustainable Development, and the G7 and G20. Adnan Amin was re-elected in January 2015 to his second term as Director-General of the IRENA. Upon the conclusion of his tenure of office in April 2019, Amin was given the honorary title of Director-General Emeritus. He was succeeded by Francesco La Camera, an Italian bureaucrat. Shortly thereafter, Amin became a Distinguished Fellow of the Atlantic Council in Washington, D. C. and Honorary Professor of Practice at his alma mater, the University of Sussex.

=== Later career ===
Amin later became a Senior Fellow of the Geopolitics of Energy Project at the Belfer Center for Science and International Affairs at the John F. Kennedy School of Government at Harvard.

== Other activities ==
- Porsche, Member of the Sustainability Council (since 2021)
- World Conservation Monitoring Centre, Trustee and a Member of the Board of Directors

== Honours and awards ==
In 2019, the government of the United Arab Emirates decorated Amin with the Order of Zayed (first class) "in recognition of his efforts in renewable energy."
