= International Partnership for Energy Efficiency Cooperation =

International forum

International Partnership for Energy Efficiency Cooperation (IPEEC)
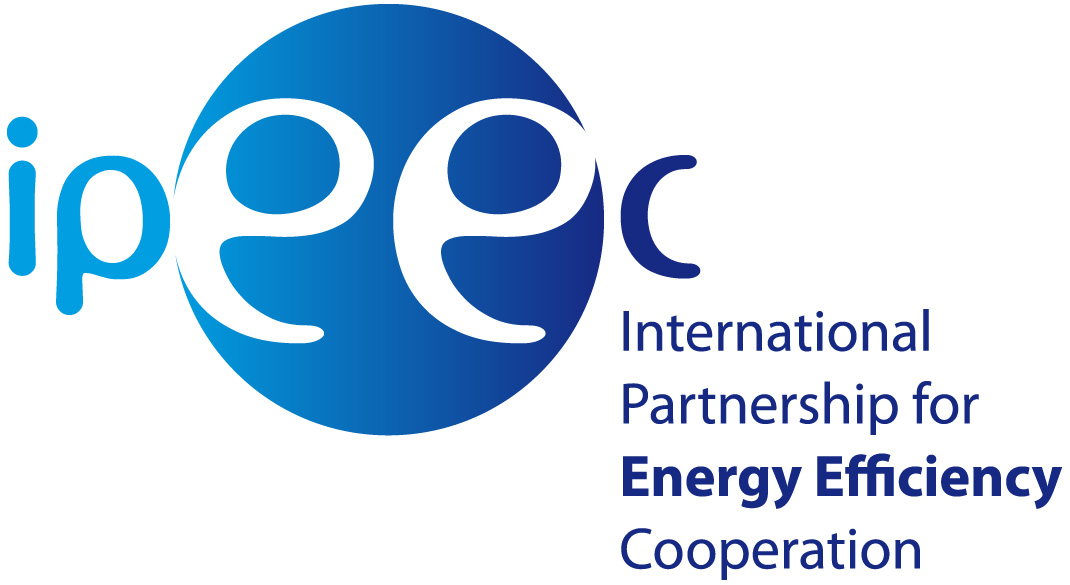
- IPEEC Logo

- IPEEC Member states Candidate for accession
- Secretariat: Paris, France
- Establishment: 2009 (17 years ago)
- Website www.ipeec.org

The Partnership for Energy Efficiency Cooperation (IPEEC) is a high-level international forum which includes developed and developing countries. Its purpose is to enhance global cooperation in the field of energy efficiency and to facilitate policies that yield energy efficiency gains across all sectors globally. IPEEC provides information to decision-makers in major economies, facilitating candid discussions for exchanging ideas and experiences and helping countries undertake joint projects to develop and implement energy efficiency policies and measures at a global scale. It is also a forum for member and non-member economies to share information about various bilateral and multilateral initiatives. IPEEC supported initiatives are open to both member and non-member nations as well as the private sector. IPEEC is coordinating the implementation of the Group of 20 (G20) Energy Efficiency Action Plan, which was agreed by G20 leaders in late 2014 as a practical approach to strengthening voluntary international energy efficiency collaboration. Since July 2016, IPEEC is coordinating the Energy Efficiency Leading Programme (EELP) that provides the basis for a ‘comprehensive, flexible, and adequately-resourced’ framework for strengthened voluntary collaboration on energy efficiency among G20 members and beyond.

The IPEEC Secretariat is governed by two core committees: the Executive Committee and the Policy Committee. Both these committees meet twice a year to determine the forward work program and discuss results of current and previous projects.

== History ==
At the Gleneagles (2005) and the St. Petersburg (2006) Summits, the Group of Eight (G8) industrialized countries emphasized the need for global cooperation in the field of 33rd G8 summit at Heiligendamm in June 2007, the G8 approved an EU proposal for an international initiative on energy efficiency and decided to explore the most efficient way to promote energy efficiency worldwide, jointly with the International Energy Agency (IEA).

Since its creation by the Organisation for Economic Co-operation and Development (OECD) in 1974, the IEA has promoted energy efficiency. However, its members are all developed countries. The growing economic interdependence among nations, the increasingly globalized energy market and the environmental issues affecting every country make the idea of a worldwide forum particularly relevant. IPEEC provides a forum that opens up a dialogue on energy, economic and environment issues between developed and developing nations as well as the private sector.

One year after the Heiligendamm Summit, on 8 June 2008, in Aomori, at the Energy Ministerial meeting hosted by Japan during its G8 Presidency, the energy ministers from the G8 and from China, India, South Korea and the European Community agreed to establish the IPEEC. In the Aomori Declaration, signed on June 8, 2008, the energy ministers acknowledged that "all countries, both developed and developing, share common interests for improving their energy efficiency performance", and that "developed countries need to play an important role in cooperation with developing countries, accelerating dissemination and transfer of best practices and efficient technologies".

On May 24, 2009, in Rome, the G8 members, China, South Korea, Brazil and Mexico signed the Terms of Reference of the IPEEC. This group signature officially created the IPEEC. The same day, the representatives of these countries also signed the Memorandum' asking the IEA to host the IPEEC Secretariat.

The 9th meeting of Asia-Pacific Economic Cooperation (APEC) Energy Ministers in Japan in 2010 resulted in the Fukui Declaration that supported IPEEC's goal by stating that "improving energy efficiency is one of the quickest, greenest and most cost-effective ways to address energy security, economic growth and climate change challenges at the same time".

== Membership ==
The founding members of the IPEEC are Brazil, Canada, China, European Commission, France, Germany, India, Italy, Japan, Korea, Mexico, Russia, the United Kingdom, and the United States. Membership now includes 17 countries from the G20.

Since its creation, Argentina, Australia and South Africa have also become members. IPEEC works directly with governmental ministries, departments and agencies responsible for energy efficiency. IPEEC welcomes membership by other national governmental entities and intergovernmental organisations, subject to approval by the Policy Committee.

== IPEEC's work ==
IPEEC member countries work together in different sectors to accelerate the adoption of energy efficiency policies and practices. Sectoral work is led by different task groups that design and implement technical work programmes on a range of energy efficiency topics, with the input and support of international organisations, non-governmental organisations (NGOs) and private sector partners.

=== G20 Action ===
The IPEEC Secretariat oversees and coordinates the G20's energy efficiency work under the 2014 G20 Energy Efficiency Action Plan and 2016 G20 Energy Efficiency Leading Programme. The 2016 G20 Energy Efficiency Leading Programme is the G20's first long-term plan for energy efficiency, which is a “comprehensive, flexible, and adequately-resourced” framework for strengthened voluntary collaboration on energy efficiency among G20 members and beyond.

The IPEEC Secretariat coordinates the implementation of the Leading Programme by supporting sectoral work streams called ‘task groups’, which drive collaboration and knowledge-sharing among G20 members and other participating countries on key areas for energy efficiency. The task groups are run by officials from IPEEC member countries and other participating nations with the support of expert organisations. Task groups have made considerable progress and achievements in the design, acceleration and enactment of energy efficiency policies and programmes under the G20 since 2014.

There are currently nine dedicated task groups (also referred to as work streams) under the G20 Leading Programme:

- networked devices, through the Networked Devices Task Group (NDTG);

- transport, through the Transport Task Group (TTG); and

- finance, through the Energy Efficiency Finance Task Group (EEFTG).

=== Appliances and equipment ===
The two Task Groups that are involved in this sector are:

- The Super-Efficient Equipment and Appliance Deployment initiative (SEAD); and

- Networked Devices Task Group (NDTG)

=== Buildings ===
IPEEC's work in this sector is led by the Buildings Energy Efficiency Task Group (BEET).

=== Industry ===
IPEEC's work on these issues is coordinated through the Energy Management Working Group (EMWG), which encompasses the Energy Management Action Network for Industrial Efficiency (EMAK).

=== Power ===
IPEEC's current work on the power sector is focused on the dissemination of energy efficient technologies and best practices in thermal power generation through the High Efficiency Low Emissions Task Group (HELE).

=== Transport ===
IPEEC's work in this sector is led by the Transport Task Group (TTG).

=== Cross-sector ===
IPEEC currently oversees three task groups aimed at addressing cross-sectoral issues.

- Energy Efficiency Finance Task Group (EEFTG)

- Improving Policies through Energy Efficiency Indicators (IPEEI)

- The Top Ten Energy Efficiency Best Practices and Best Available Technologies Task Group (TOP TENs)

== See also ==
- International Renewable Energy Agency
- Energy policy
- Energy policy of the European Union
- Data center infrastructure efficiency
- International Energy Agency
