= Francesco La Camera =

Italian civil servant, academic and diplomat

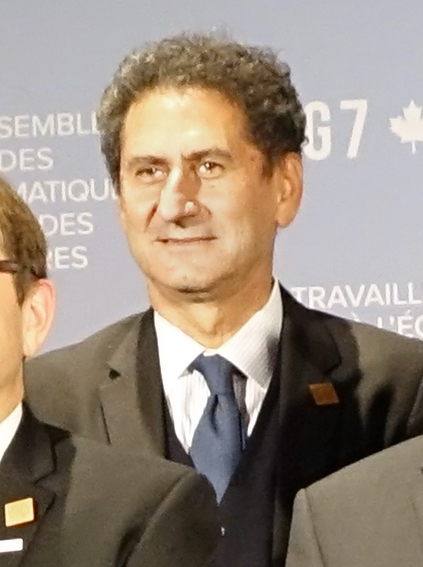
- Francesco La Camera in 2018

2nd Director-General of the IRENA
- Incumbent
- Assumed office 4 April 2019
- Preceded by: Adnan Z. Amin

Personal details
- Born: Italy
- Education: University of Messina

Francesco La Camera is an Italian civil servant, academic, diplomat who was elected the second Director-General of the International Renewable Energy Agency (IRENA), and assumed office on 4 April 2019. At the IRENA, he has a four-year tenure, after succeeding Adnan Z. Amin of Kenya, who served in a two-term tenure from 2011 to 2019 and has been given the honorary title of Director-General Emeritus. La Camera's election took place in the context of the Ninth Session of the annual Assembly of the International Renewable Energy Agency in Abu Dhabi. La Camera was previously the Director-General for Sustainable Development, Energy and Climate at the Italian Ministry of Environment, Land and Sea, where he was involved in international cooperation and partnerships agreements globally, especially in Small Island Developing States (SIDS).

== Biography ==
=== Education and early career ===
Born in Italy, Francesco La Camera was educated at the University of Messina where he received a degree in political science, with a concentration in economic policy. In his early career, he was an economic analyst with the Ministry of Budget & Planning, and a member of the Italian Environmental Impact Assessment (EIA) Commission. There are several reference publications to his credit in Italy on economic and environmental assessment instruments (CBA, EIA, SEA, etc.), sustainable development, ecological and environmental economics.

He was pivotal in the preparation, promotion and adoption of the Espoo and Aarhus Conventions. Within the United Nations Economic Commission for Europe, he led the delegation on the negotiations concerning the Aarhus Convention (1998–2007) and the Espoo Convention (1992–2002), the Convention on the Transboundary Effects of Industrial Accidents (Helsinki 1992), the Convention on (EIA) in a Transboundary Context (Espoo 1991).

Between 2003 and 2010, La Camera was a Professor of Environmental and Land Economics at the Faculty of Engineering of the University of Roma Tre. He taught "Sustainable Development" at the Faculty of Economy of the Mediterranea University of Reggio Calabria, from 2006 to 2008.

=== Diplomacy ===
As the Director-General of the Department for Sustainable Development, Environmental Damage, European Union and International Affairs, he leads international affairs in the Ministry of Environment, Land and Sea and the greening of EU Structural Funds. He has been a representative of Italy in many international fora, particularly at the EU, UNECE, UN-CSD, UN Environment, and the OECD. He was the head delegate of the EU and Italian negotiation teams at the climate COP 20 in Lima in 2014 and was the head of the Italian delegation to the three previous COPs, including COP 21 in Paris 2015 and COP 22 in Marrakech 2016. He was also in charge of the organization of the G7 Environment 2017, under the Italian Presidency; the Sustainable Development Goals (SDGs) and the preparation of the National Strategy for Sustainable Development as well as the national dialogue on sustainable finance with the UN Environment.

La Camera's appointment came at the end of the ninth Assembly of IRENA, the largest assembly it has ever convened, attended by 120 ministers joined by 1,200 delegates from 150 countries including the Canada that joined the IRENA on the eve of the conference.

Upon his selection as the Director-General of the IRENA, the Commissioner for Energy and Climate Action at the European Commission, Miguel Arias Cañete noted, "The election of a European candidate for this important organisation demonstrates our leadership in the global world of renewables. I am confident that Mr. La Camera is the right person to lead the International Renewable Energy Agency in the next phase of renewables deployment worldwide". The organisation's role is to support the acceleration of renewable energy globally by providing technical expertise, policy support and new data and analysis to national governments. In the European Union, the International Renewable Energy Agency played an important role in the assessment of Europe's cost-competitive potential for renewables in 2030.

Upon assuming his new role Francesco La Camera will lead the IRENA Secretariat and the implementation of the Agency's work programme and budget, in areas relating to international cooperation on renewable energy, providing a centre of excellence for knowledge and innovation which supports countries world-wide in their transition to a sustainable energy future. La Camera tweeted his gratitude, writing: "Thanks to the IRENA membership for the trust. I am honoured to have been elected DG [director-general]. We will do a great job together". Dutch ambassador to the UAE, Frank Mollen said he looked forward to working with the new Director-General. Dominique Ristori, the Director-General for Energy of the European Commission who represented the European Union at IRENA's ninth assembly, offered his full support. La Camera's colleagues at the Italian ministry parastatal, the Italian Institute for Environmental Protection and Research (ISPRA), the President of the National System for Environmental Protection (SNPA), Stefano Laporta and the Director-General, Alessandro Bratti conveyed their felicitations with the goodwill message, "Renewables, an essential choice for the future of the planet."

At the conference, IRENA and the Abu Dhabi Fund for Development (ADFD) agreed to a $31 million loan facility to finance projects in Guyana, Liberia and Togo. Of this amount, $8 million will go towards the installation of 5.2MW grid-connected solar photovoltaic systems to reduce fossil fuel consumption and increase electricity reliability in Guyana. Another $8 million will go to the construction of a 2.1MW hydropower plant in Liberia and a further $15 million will go to a 30MW solar photovoltaic plant in Togo with capacity to power 700,000 homes. This funding takes the amount invested by IRENA and the ADFD to $245 million since 2013.

Two new reports were also published at the Assembly: Renewable Energy: A Gender Perspective, providing a commentary of women participation in the renewables sector, in addition to A New World: The Geopolitics of the Energy Transformation, an exposé on the changing global energy situation due to the renewable energy transformations.
