= B. J. Penn (United States Navy) =

American government official

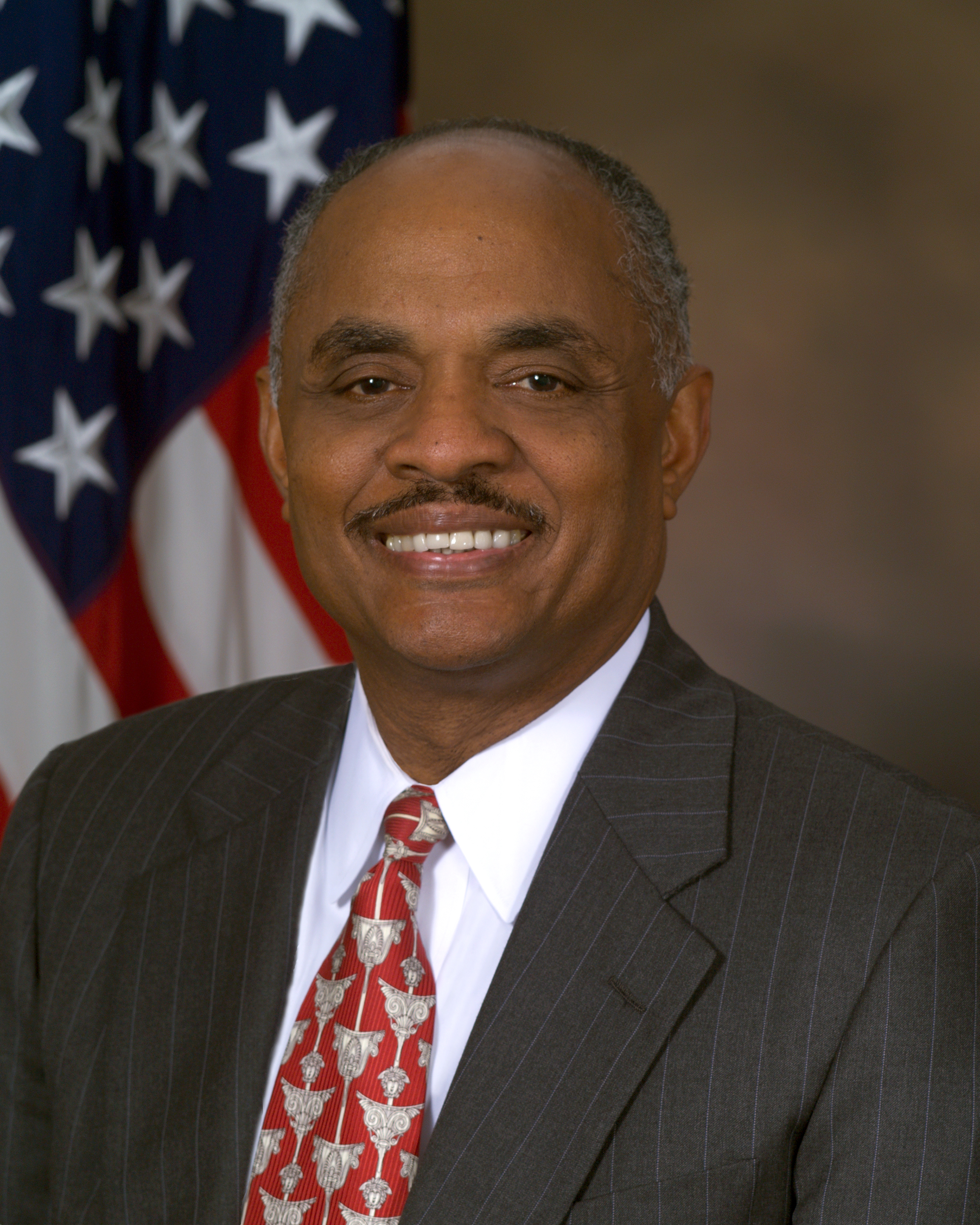

Acting United States Secretary of the Navy
- In office March 13, 2009 – May 19, 2009
- President: Barack Obama
- Preceded by: Donald C. Winter
- Succeeded by: Ray Mabus

United States Assistant Secretary of the Navy for Installations and Environment
- In office March 1, 2005 – March 13, 2009
- President: George W. Bush; Barack Obama
- Preceded by: Hansford T. Johnson
- Succeeded by: Roger M. Natsuhara (acting)

Personal details
- Born: Buddie Joe Penn; April 3, 1938 (age 88) Peru, Indiana, U.S.
- Education: Purdue University, West Lafayette (BS); George Washington University (MS)

Buddie Joe "B. J." Penn (born April 2, 1938) was the Assistant Secretary of the Navy (Installation and Environment) in the United States Department of the Navy from 2005 to 2009. He briefly served as acting United States Secretary of the Navy from March 13, 2009 to May 19, 2009.

== Biography ==
B. J. Penn was born in 1938 in Peru, Indiana and was educated at Purdue University (B.S.) and George Washington University (M.S.). He would later also acquire a certificate in Aerospace Safety from the University of Southern California and a certificate in National Security for Senior Officials from the John F. Kennedy School of Government. He is also a member of Alpha Phi Alpha fraternity and an Eagle Scout within the Boy Scouts of America.

Penn began his career in the United States Navy as a United States Naval Aviator, ultimately amassing 6,500 hours of flight time in sixteen different aircraft. He was named the Navy's EA-6B Prowler Replacement Training Squadron Student Pilot of the Year in 1972. Following operational flying tours in the fleet and ashore, he went on to serve as a Battalion Officer at the United States Naval Academy (including serving as officer in charge of the Plebe Detail for the class of 1983) before returning to an EA-6B squadron for his department head tour. Screening for Aviation Command, he served as executive officer and later commanding officer of Tactical Electronic Warfare Squadron THIRTY-THREE (VAQ-33) at NAS Key West, Florida within the Fleet Electronic Warfare Support Group. He then served as Air Officer aboard the USS America (CV-66) followed by shore duty as a special assistant to the Chief of Naval Operations. Screening for Aviation Major Command, he served as commanding officer of Naval Air Station North Island, California, and a post-major command tour as deputy director of the Navy Office of Technology Transfer & Security Assistance.

Penn retired from the Navy in the rank of captain and entered the private sector in 1995, joining Loral Corporation as director of international business; his work at Loral focused on airborne Electronic Warfare and Defensive Electronic Counter Measure Systems. In 1996, Loral sold its defense electronics and system integration businesses to Lockheed Martin and Penn was assigned to Lockheed Martin's corporate staff responsible for developing markets in Central and Eastern Europe. In 1998, he transferred to the Lockheed Martin's Naval Electronics and Surveillance Systems working Advanced Programs; there he focused on Interoperability CONOPS for the Joint Strike Fighter Program, on upgrading the technology used in the F-16 Fighting Falcon, on efforts to develop Unmanned Aerial Vehicles and Autonomous Undersea Vehicles, and on C4ISR initiatives.

Penn returned to the U.S. Navy in October 2001 as director of industrial base assessments. In this capacity, he was responsible for the Navy's industrial base, i.e. for ensuring that defense contractors had sufficient capacity and capabilities to meet the Navy's ongoing needs for national defense.

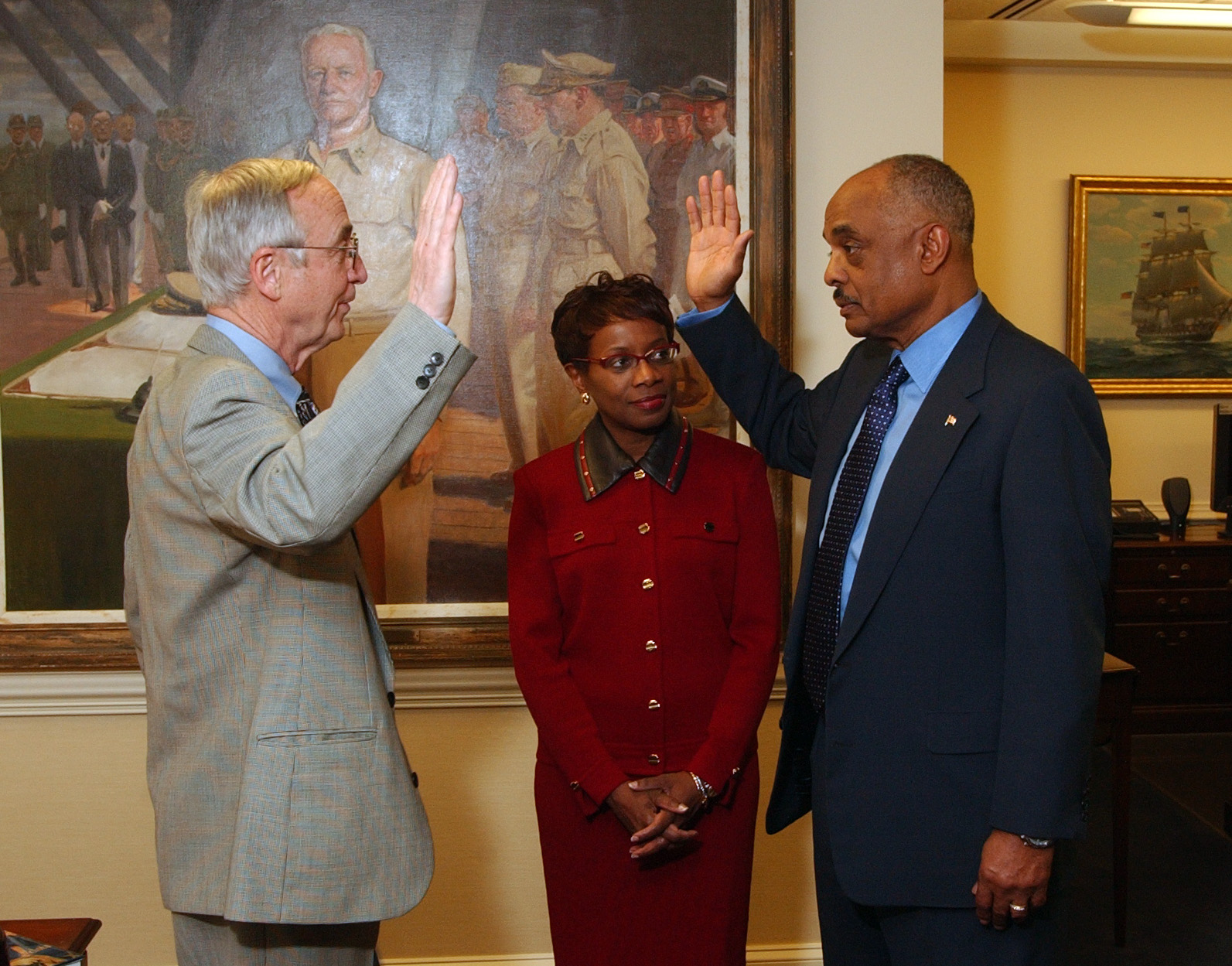
United States Secretary of the Navy Gordon R. England swearing in B. J. Penn as Assistant Secretary of the Navy (Installation and Environment) on March 1, 2005.

President of the United States George W. Bush named Penn Assistant Secretary of the Navy (Installation and Environment), and Penn assumed this post on March 1, 2005.

Under President Barack Obama, he briefly served as acting United States Secretary of the Navy from March 13, 2009 to May 19, 2009.

He currently serves as an advisor and director including on the board of Lone Star Analysis.

Penn is a member of the Defense Policy Board Advisory Committee.

Government offices
Preceded by Hansford T. Johnson	United States Assistant Secretary of the Navy for Installations and Environment; 2005–2009	Succeeded by Roger M. Natsuhara; Acting
Preceded by Donald C. Winter	United States Secretary of the Navy; Acting; 2009	Succeeded by Ray Mabus
