= Lorenzo Suding =

Lorenzo Suding (born 15 March 1986) is a professional mountain bike (MTB) downhill and enduro athlete and multiple champion of Italy, living in Valle d’Aosta.

== Life ==
Born in Dormagen, in the vicinity of Cologne, Germany, Suding is the son of the late Italian national Elena Corgiolu-Suding from Ulassai, Sardinia, and German national Paul Hugo Suding, an energy and development economist from Lüsche (Bakum), Germany. He has one sibling, the older sister Lucrezia.

Suding left Germany at the age of 3 with his family and lived in Bujumbura (Burundi), Quito (Ecuador), and Beijing (China), where he attended schools that taught in French, Spanish, English and German. He accomplished the Swiss Matura in 2006 at Hochalpines Institut Ftan Ftan, in the vicinity of Scuol, Engadin. His class mate was Dario Cologna. He then went to the Istituto Europeo di Design (IED) Torino to study car design, which he dropped after a successful first year to dedicate his entire time to become a professional athlete and to move to Pila, in the Aosta Valley.

== Career ==
In 1997 Suding started mountain biking in Ecuador where he won national Under-13 Cross Country as well as Down-Hill races. After a hiatus in China he resumed MTB in 2003 when he attended the famous Hochalpines Institut Ftan in Switzerland and was part of its sports class. In 2006, Suding chose Italian Nationality and became Member of the National Team. From 2009 to 2013 he won the overall Italian MTB DH championship five times in a row, and moved up in 2013 to the top 20 in world ranking.

In July 2014, Suding was critically injured in car accident. After recovery, Suding switched to the new discipline of Mountain Bike Enduro, and on 23 April 2017 he won the MTB Enduro Championship of the Italian Cyclistical Federation.
