= Renewable Energy and Energy Efficiency Partnership =

Organization for renewable energy

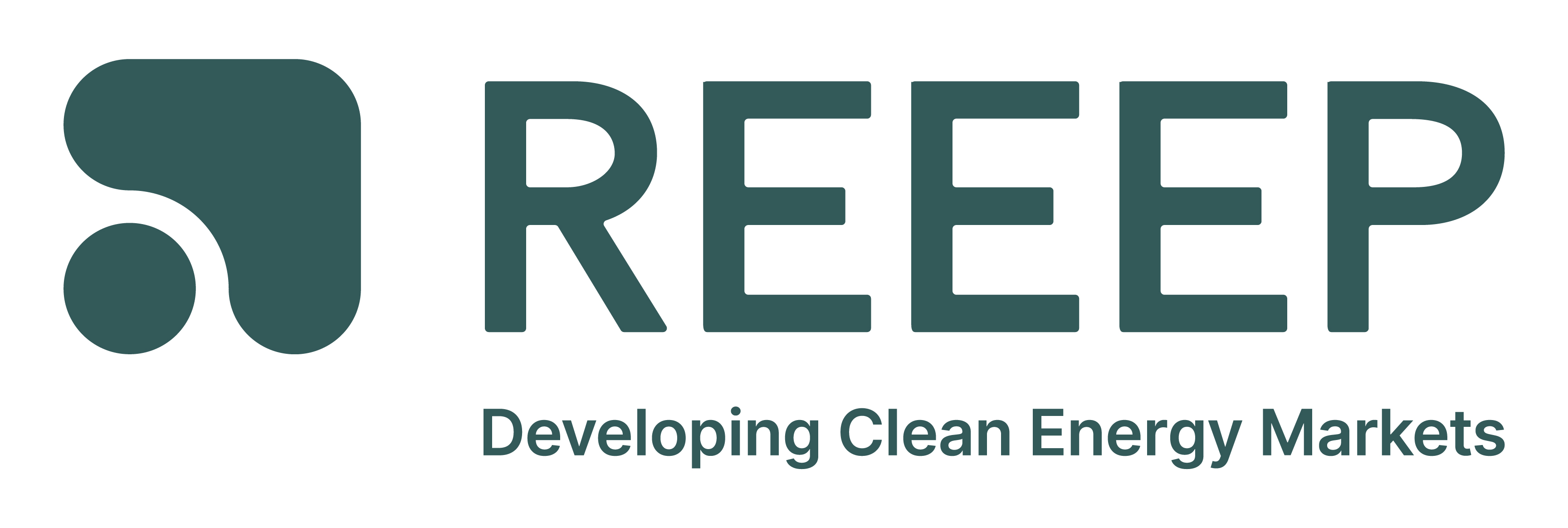
The logo of the Renewable Energy and Energy Efficiency Partnership (REEEP), including tagline " Developing Clean Energy Markets"

The Renewable Energy and Energy Efficiency Partnership (REEEP) is a Vienna-based Quasi-International Organisation that advances markets for renewable energy and energy efficiency with a particular emphasis on the emerging markets and developing countries.

REEEP was originally launched by the government of the United Kingdom, along with other partners, at the Johannesburg World Summit on Sustainable Development (WSSD) in August 2002. Since 2004 it has been headquartered at the United Nations Office in Vienna and is supported by the Government of Austria among others.

REEEP develops and implements programmes which use a combination of financial instruments, capacity building, facilitation of stakeholder cooperation and technical assistance to encourage private sector investment in clean energy markets, primarily in low- and middle income countries.

== Origins and funders ==
In 2002, accelerating the development of renewable energy and energy efficiency technologies was one of the priorities of a large group of countries at the WSSD. Margaret Beckett, then UK Minister for the Environment announced the initiative to form REEEP at the summit's closing session. It grew from an agreement with other committed governments, businesses and NGOs to deliver WSSD commitments others, in particular to take forward the key recommendations of the G8 Renewable Energy Task Force.

From January 2003 until May 2004, the REEEP was housed within the UK Foreign and Commonwealth Office (FCO) where it continued following the UN Type II Partnership process of stakeholder consultation. In June 2004, REEEP obtained formal, legal non-profit status as an international NGO and has since been located at the UN complex in Vienna, Austria. In 2016, REEEP was granted status as a Quasi-International Organisation in Austria, along with four other organisations.

As of 2024, the organisation has been funded primarily by governments including: Australia, Austria, Canada, Germany, Ireland, Italy, Spain, Switzerland, The Netherlands, the United Kingdom, the United States and the European Commission.

== Projects ==
In the first phase of its existence (2002-2014) REEEP acted largely as a re-granting institution. The majority have targeted emerging markets such as India, China, and southern Africa.

Since 2014, REEEP has focused its work toward the targeted "de-risking" of specific markets and sectors, such as solar-powered irrigation systems in East Africa, solar-powered dairy cooling in Bangladesh, or innovative decentralized mini-grid models in Tanzania.

Regionally, REEEP has shifted concentration to low- and middle-income countries, although it continues to work in India and South Africa, which are generally considered to be emerging markets.

It designed and implemented the Beyond the Grid Fund for Zambia, funded by Sweden, which won the Ashden Award in 2019 and delivered energy service subscriptions to over 1 million Zambians. The programme has been expanded into the Beyond the Grid Fund for Africa which as of 2024 aims to reach over 8.6 million people across Burkina Faso, DRC, Liberia, Uganda and Zambia.

REEEP's other completed projects include:

- Powering Agrifood Value Chains - a project to develop evidence-based intervention guidance for energy utilisation in the food-producing agricultural sector.
- Climate Change, Clean Energy and Urban Water Works in Southern Africa - a joint REEEP-UNIDO project to accelerate market-based solutions for energy-related investment to improve municipal water works in Southern Africa.
- SWITCH Africa Green - a project to support African countries in their transition to an Inclusive Green Economy and promoting sustainable consumption and production (SCP) practices and patterns.
- Climate Knowledge Brokers Group - a community of practice that furthers improvements and efficiency gains in the global climate knowledge system.

== Internet-based resources ==
=== reegle.info ===
reegle was developed by REEEP in collaboration with REN21, and was funded by the governments of Germany, Netherlands, United Kingdom. reegle was an advocate of the Linked Open Data movement, which seeks to make public data available on the web in open formats that are machine-readable.

== Partners ==
As of 2023, REEEP has 385 partners, 45 of which are governments, including all the G7 countries and key government agencies from India and China, other emerging markets and the developing world. Partners also include a range of businesses, NGOs and civil society organisations.

Among other organisations, REEEP has worked with the United Nations Industrial Development Organization, the International Renewable Energy Agency, the International Energy Agency, the Global Village Energy Partnership, CLASP and the Johannesburg Renewable Energy Coalition.

== See also ==
- Johannesburg Renewable Energy Coalition
- Renewable energy commercialization
- Renewable Energy Policy Network for the 21st Century
- World Business Council for Sustainable Development
- World Summit on Sustainable Development
