= Paul Hugo Suding =

German economist

Paul-Hugo Suding (born 23 January 1949 in Vechta, Germany) is an energy economist and international development specialist, living in Saint-Christophe, Aosta Valley region in Italy.

Suding was the first Head of Secretariat of the Global Renewable Energy Policy Network REN21 in Paris, from 2006 to 2008. He held numerous long term assignments to countries and development organizations as program director for Deutsche Gesellschaft für Internationale Zusammenarbeit (GIZ) GmbH, from which he retired in 2014. Suding has published more than 100 books and articles on energy, environment, climate, including refereed articles. He is one of the first recipients of the Theodor Wessels Award in the category of doctor dissertations.

== Life ==
Suding was born as 7th child to Auguste and Joseph Suding from the village of Lüsche (Bakum). In 1967, he took the baccalaureate in the classical curriculum at the catholic boarding school Gymnasium Leoninum in Handrup, Germany. Suding moved to Cologne for studies interrupted by draft military service and went on to work and live in the Cologne area until entering, in 1989, a 25 year long expatriate life with his family, with residences in Bujumbura (Burundi), Quito (Ecuador), Beijing (China), Paris (France), Cairo (Egypt) and Washington D.C. Since retirement in 2014, he lived in the Netherlands before moving to Italy in 2020.

Suding was married from 1981 to her death in 2015 to Italian national Elena Corgiolu from Ulassai, Sardinia. The couple has two children: Lucrezia Langbein M.D. née Suding and the multiple Italian Mountain-bike Downhill Champion Lorenzo Suding.

== Career ==
Suding holds a Diploma in business administration (1973) and a Ph.D. in economics (1983), with specialization in energy economics from the University of Cologne. For his doctoral dissertation he received the Theodor Wessels Award in 1984. Suding has worked since 1973 as researcher and lecturer at the Institute of Energy Economics (EWI) at the University of Cologne, and from 1981 to 1989 as Partner in the German consulting firm ENERWA. He pioneered technical-economic analysis of energy consumption, first disaggregation of residential and small users energy consumption in Germany and bottom-up analysis and energy prognosis. 1976/77 he was Associate in the Global Workshop on Alternative Energy Strategies WAES. In GIZ, he was responsible for various German bilateral energy and environment programs in Burundi (1989–93), China (1999 – 2006) and Egypt (2008 – 2010), financed by the Federal Ministry of Economic Cooperation and Development (BMZ). He also was from 1993-99 the German Director of the Sustainable Energy and Development cooperation program with the Organización Latino Americana de Energía OLADE and ECLAC (United Nations Economic Commission for Latin America and the Caribbean). From 2008 until retirement in 2014 he was Director of a cooperation program on climate change and energy for Latin America and the Caribbean with the Inter-American Development Bank IDB.

== Selected publications ==
- Ökonomische Ansätze zur Analyse des Energieverbrauchs der Haushalte für Raumwärmezwecke, München 1984 ISBN 3-486-28661-7 (Microeconomics of residential heating)
- Strukturen des Energieverbrauchs der Haushalte und Kleinverbraucher, München 1982 ISBN 3-486-27481-3
- Energy and Sustainable Development in Latin America and the Caribbean: Approaches to Energy Policy, OLADE/CEPAL/GTZ Project, Quito 1996 with Hugo Altomonte, Francisco Figueroa and Hector Pistonesi
- Opening-up and transition, success and problems. Financing and reforms of the electric power sector of Latin America and the Caribbean, in: Energy Policy Vol.24 No 5 May 1996, ISSN 0301-4215, pp. 437
- Energy and Sustainable Development: Guide for Energy Policymaking, OLADE/CEPAL/GTZ Project, Quito 2000, (Co-ordinator) http://www.energycommunity.org/documents/OLADEGuideEnergyPolicymaking.pdf
- China's Energy Economy and Policy, Feature Article in Annual Report of German Chapter of World Energy Council 2005. www.weltenergierat.de
- Struggling between resources-based and sustainable development schemes — An analysis of Egypt’s recent energy policy, in: Energy Policy Volume 39 Issue 8 August 2011 ISSN 0301-4215, pp. 4431
