= Strike Fighter Weapons School Atlantic =

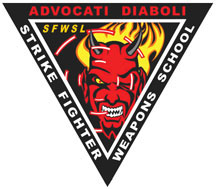
SFWSL logo

Strike Fighter Weapons School Atlantic (SFWSLANT), is a US Navy Atlantic Fleet weapons school based at Naval Air Station Oceana in Virginia Beach, Virginia. The school provides standardized, post-graduate level training for F/A-18 strike fighter tactics, mission planning, strike intelligence and air-launched weapons handling, loading and mission employment to Navy, Marine Corps, and Naval Reserve units. Strike Fighter Weapons School Pacific at Naval Air Station Lemoore in California is the United States Pacific Fleet equivalent. NAS Oceana is where the Navy’s Atlantic and Pacific Fleet force of strike-fighter aircraft and joint/inter-agency operations are located. The airfields of NAS Oceana and NALF Fentress have five carrier air wings and 17 squadrons that conducted 128,675 flight operations.

== History of weapons schools ==
In 1963, a weapons training center was established to support NAS Lemoore's light attack fleet training syllabus. Part of this center was VFA-122 and VFA-125, which later developed into a graduate-level weapons school. This growth led to the establishment of the Light Attack Weapons School, Pacific, as a parallel training center within the Weapons Training Center, focused on training officers of fleet squadrons. The Chief of Naval Operations recognized the need for postgraduate weapons training and expressed a desire to create a new command and the Weapons Training Center was transferred to the program and it was redesignated to Strike Fighter Weapons School Pacific on July 1, 1988 for more autonomy.

== Strike Fighter Weapons School Atlantic ==
SFWSP is mirrored on the East Coast as Strike Fighter Weapons School Atlantic (SFWSL). In the 1960s, as new weapons were introduced to the fleet, aircrews and ordnance personnel needed training on loading and delivery of these weapons. Training was provided when Conventional Weapons School was formed as a department of Readiness Attack Carrier Air Wing (RCVW-4). Its mission was to provide training for A-4 Skyhawk/A-7 Corsair aircraft. Eventually RCVW-4 became CLAW-1, of which the weapons school became a department based at NAS Cecil Field. On May 4, 1987, Light Attack Weapons School Atlantic, (LAWSLant) was designated a shore command, providing training for navy light attack aircraft. On May 1, 1988, the name was changed to Strike Fighter Weapons School, Atlantic, in order to coincide with the transition to the F/A-18 Hornet and its dual mission capabilities. In 1999 SFWSL moved from NAS Cecil Field to NAS Oceana and is now part of Strike Fighter Wing Atlantic. On March 22, 2002, the F-14 Weapons School, Strike Weapons & Tactics School (SWATSLANT), was consolidated with SFWSL as part of the transition from the F-14 Tomcat to the F/A-18 Super Hornet. This allowed a synergistic approach to the training of the strike fighter community.

== Training and responsibilities ==
Both the East and West coast Weapons Schools are responsible for Strike Fighter Advanced Readiness Program (SFARP) which is the first part of the Fighter Advanced Training Program (FTARP). Aircrews spend two weeks at their home station attending 18 lectures on aircraft weapons systems, tactics and F/A-18 employment from Strike Fighter Tactics Instructors (SFTI) assigned to the respective school. After completion of these lectures, aircrews spend another week flying the first five of 15 flights in the SFARP syllabus before heading to NAS Fallon, there they draw experience of the SFTIs and use Naval Strike and Air Warfare Center ranges and adversaries to hone their skills to be used in future combat operations.

Both schools are also responsible for training of Forward Air Controllers (Airborne), after completion of the Tactical Air Control Party course, F/A-18F aircrews receive 17 lectures and nine flights provided by the FAC(A) instructors at the weapons school, after completion of the training, the FAC(A)s are able to coordinate weapons employment in support of close-air-support missions with friendly troops.

SFWSP/L instructors regularly fly with local squadrons and host various conferences at their respective facilities while not at Fallon, many flights are part of Strike Fighter Weapons and Tactics (SFWT) program which is a syllabus for employing the F/A-18 in combat, all F/A-18 aircrews take part in SFWT, SFWSP/L instructors teaches safe and sound execution of section and division tactics in accordance with the latest recommendations from TOPGUN.

SFWSL is staffed with 25 permanently assigned officers and 26 enlisted personnel and seven civilians.
