= American Council on Renewable Energy =

Non-profit organization

American Council On Renewable Energy (ACORE)
- Company type: Nonprofit 501(c)3
- Founded: 2001
- Headquarters: Washington, D.C., United States
- Key people: Greg Wetstone, president & CEO, board of directors
- Website: www.acore.org

Founded in 2001, the American Council on Renewable Energy (ACORE) is a member-based, 501(c)(3) national non-profit organization that unites finance, policy and technology to accelerate the transition to a renewable energy economy.

ACORE's membership spans renewable energy technologies and constituencies, including developers, manufacturers, financial institutions, corporate end-users, grid technology providers, utilities, professional service firms, universities and other non-profit groups. ACORE's work revolves around convening leaders across key constituencies, facilitating partnerships, educating federal and state legislators and agency officials on important policies, publishing research and analysis on pressing issues, and undertaking strategic outreach on the policies and financial structures essential to renewable energy growth.

Michael Eckhart founded the organization in 2001 to bring together leading proponents and innovators in all facets of the renewable energy sector for the purpose of moving renewable energy into the mainstream of America’s economy. In 2011, retired vice admiral Dennis V. McGinn was named president and CEO of ACORE. Under McGinn's leadership, ACORE's mission was updated to reflect the successes of the industry during ACORE's first decade. In July, 2013, McGinn was nominated by President Obama to serve as the Assistant Secretary of the Navy (Energy, Installations & Environment). ACORE's board of directors tapped board member Michael Brower to fill in as interim president and CEO. In January, 2014, the board voted for Brower to serve as the organization's full-time president and CEO. Brower retired in December, 2014 and Dan Reicher, chairman of the board of directors, served as interim president and CEO until Gregory Wetstone was named president and CEO in December 2015.

In January 2023, Wetstone announced he would be stepping down after more than 7 years of leadership. In October 2023, ACORE’s board of directors selected Ray Long to serve as the organization’s new president and CEO.

== Programs ==
The Macro Grid Initiative is an ACORE program that promotes investment in a 21st century transmission network. The program was launched with funding from Breakthrough Energy, an organization founded by Bill Gates.

In 2020, ACORE created the Accelerate Membership Program to improve diversity, equity, and inclusion within the renewable energy sector and reduce barriers for participants from underrepresented communities. Accelerate member companies are small businesses focused on renewable energy and supportive technologies, owned and/or operated by leaders who identify as women, Asian-Indian, Asian-Pacific, Black, Hispanic, or Native American. The ACORE program was selected as a winner of the U.S. Department of Energy’s Inclusive Energy Innovation Prize in 2022.

ACORE has two executive programs:

- The Partnership for Renewable Energy Finance (PREF) is a coalition of senior-level officials with companies that finance, develop, manufacture, and use renewable energy. PREF members focus on increasing capital formation and investment in renewable energy and educating the public sector to ensure that policy impacts the market as efficiently and effectively as possible.
- The Partnership for Renewable Integration and Market Expansion (PRIME) is an invitation-only leadership program of prominent, multi-technology renewable energy companies, investors and corporate end-users that guide ACORE's strategic policy agenda.

== Forums ==
ACORE organizes three major events each year, as well as an ongoing webinar series. These include:

- ACORE Policy Forum: The ACORE Policy Forum is a pan-technology renewable energy summit that unites senior leaders from across government and the renewable energy industry in Washington, D.C. It features discussions between industry leaders and key elected officials and offers perspectives on the challenges and opportunities in the renewable energy industry.
- ACORE Finance Forum: The ACORE Finance Forum gathers senior investors, industry executives, and other top transactional professionals to assess the state of play for renewable energy finance and investment.
- ACORE Grid Forum: The ACORE Grid Forum convenes regulators, renewable energy, storage and transmission companies, and other leading grid experts to maximize the use and integration of renewable energy in our nation's power markets.

== See also ==
- American Wind Energy Association
- Solar Energy Industries Association
- Energy conservation
- Energy Information Administration
- National Renewable Energy Laboratory
- Renewable energy commercialization
- Wind power in the United States
