= Lists of renewable energy topics =

Renewable energy is generally defined as energy that comes from resources which are naturally replenished on a human timescale, such as sunlight, wind, rain, tides, waves, and geothermal heat. Renewable energy replaces conventional fuels in four distinct areas: electricity generation, air and water heating/cooling, motor fuels, and rural (off-grid) energy services. Based on REN21's 2014 report, renewables contributed 19 percent to our global energy consumption and 22 percent to our electricity generation in 2012 and 2013, respectively.

These are lists about renewable energy:

- Index of solar energy articles
- List of books about renewable energy
- List of concentrating solar thermal power companies
- List of countries by electricity production from renewable sources
- List of energy storage projects
- Lists of environmental topics
- List of geothermal power stations
- List of hydroelectric power stations
- List of largest hydroelectric power stations
- List of offshore wind farms
- Lists of offshore wind farms by country
- Lists of offshore wind farms by water area
- List of onshore wind farms
- List of onshore wind farms in the United Kingdom
- List of photovoltaics companies
- List of photovoltaic power stations
- List of pioneering solar buildings
- List of renewable energy organizations
- List of renewable energy topics by country
- List of rooftop photovoltaic installations
- List of solar car teams
- List of solar powered products
- List of solar thermal power stations
- List of U.S. states by electricity production from renewable sources
- Lists of wind farms by country
- List of wind farms in Australia
- List of wind farms in Canada
- List of wind farms in Iran
- List of wind farms in Romania
- List of wind farms in Sweden
- List of wind farms in the United States
- List of wind turbine manufacturers

== See also ==
- Outline of solar energy
- Outline of wind energy
