= REN21 =

Multi-stakeholder network focused on renewable energy policy

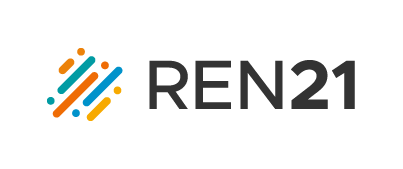
REN21 logo

REN21 (Renewable Energy Policy Network for the 21st Century) is a policy network and a multistakeholder governance group focused on renewable energy policy.

REN21's goal is to facilitate policy development, knowledge exchange, and joint action towards a rapid global transition to renewable energy. REN21 brings together governments, non-governmental organisations, research and academic institutions, international organisations, and industry to learn from one another and advance the adoption of renewable energy.

To assist policy decision-making, REN21 provides knowledge about what is happening now in the renewable energy sector and how the latest trends will impact future developments. REN21 facilitates the collection of information on renewable energy. It does this through six products: the Renewables Global Status Report (GSR), regional status reports, global futures reports (GFR), thematic reports, the REN21 Renewables Academy, and the International Renewable Energy Conference (IREC) series.

The REN21 Secretariat is based in Paris, France, and is a registered non-profit association under German law (e.V.). The organisation has more than 100 member organisations as of 2024 and over 4000 active community members.

== History ==
REN21 was launched in June 2004 as an outcome of the International Conference for Renewable Energies in Bonn, Germany. Paul Hugo Suding, was the first executive secretary upon REN21's formation in 2006. He was succeeded by Virginia Sonntag O'Brien (2008–2011), Christine Lins (2011–2018), and Rana Adib (2018–present).

== Publications ==
=== Renewables Global Status Report (GSR) ===
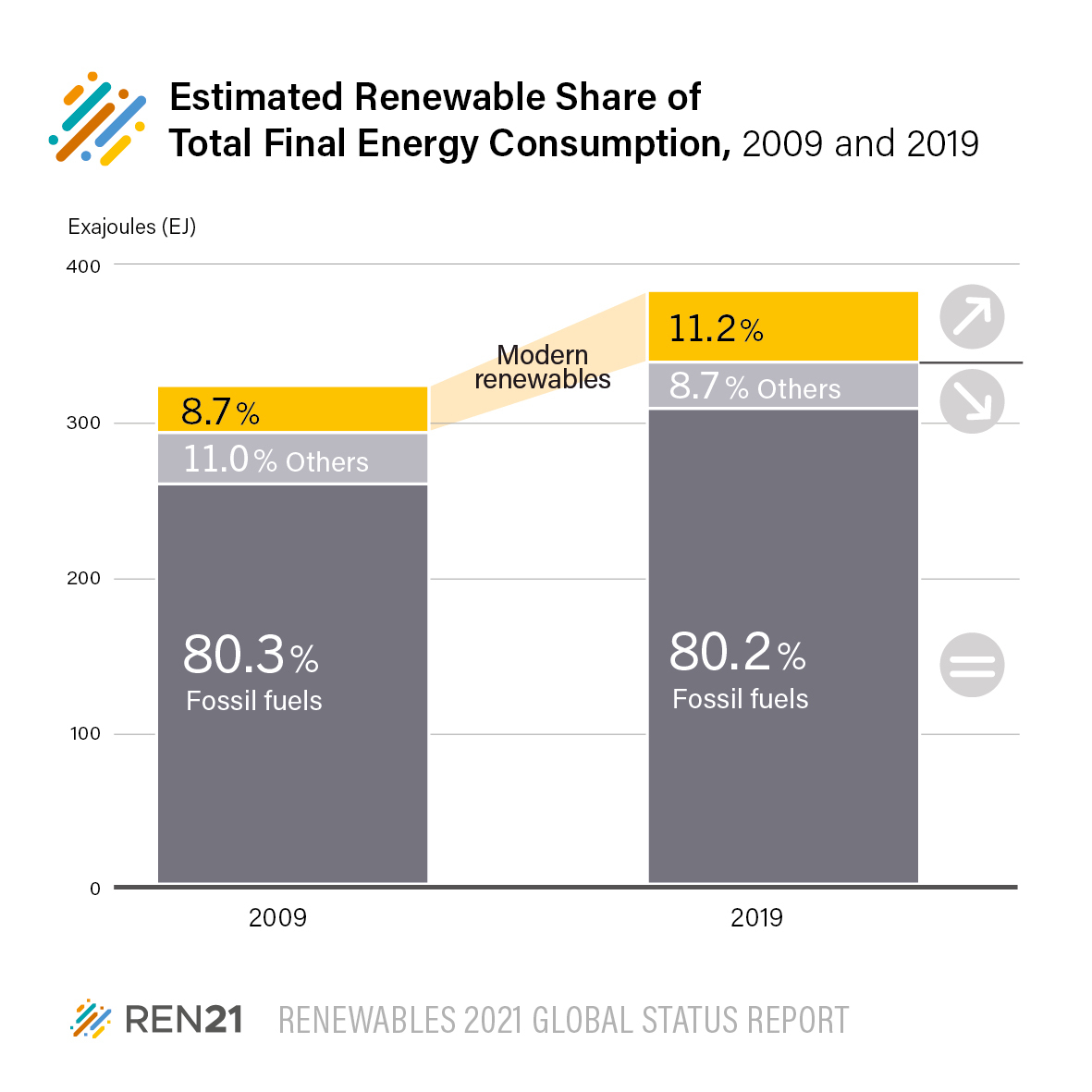
While the share of renewable energy has increased in the last decade, the share of fossil fuels remains roughly the same (80.3% in 2009 v. 80.2% in 2019). Furthermore, the amount of energy the world consumes has increased.

The Renewables Global Status Report (GSR) is the most frequently referenced report on the subject of the renewable energy market, industry, and policy trends. This annual report, which has been produced since 2005 details the current status of the deployment of renewable technologies globally, covering the energy sector (power, heating and cooling and transport), reporting on policy development, the energy industry, investment and markets. The report is based on data and information contributed by the REN21 member network of more than 900 experts and researchers from around the world and undergoes an open peer-review process. The report illustrates that, while transformation in the power sector with renewables is picking up speed, urgent action is required in heating, cooling, and transport.

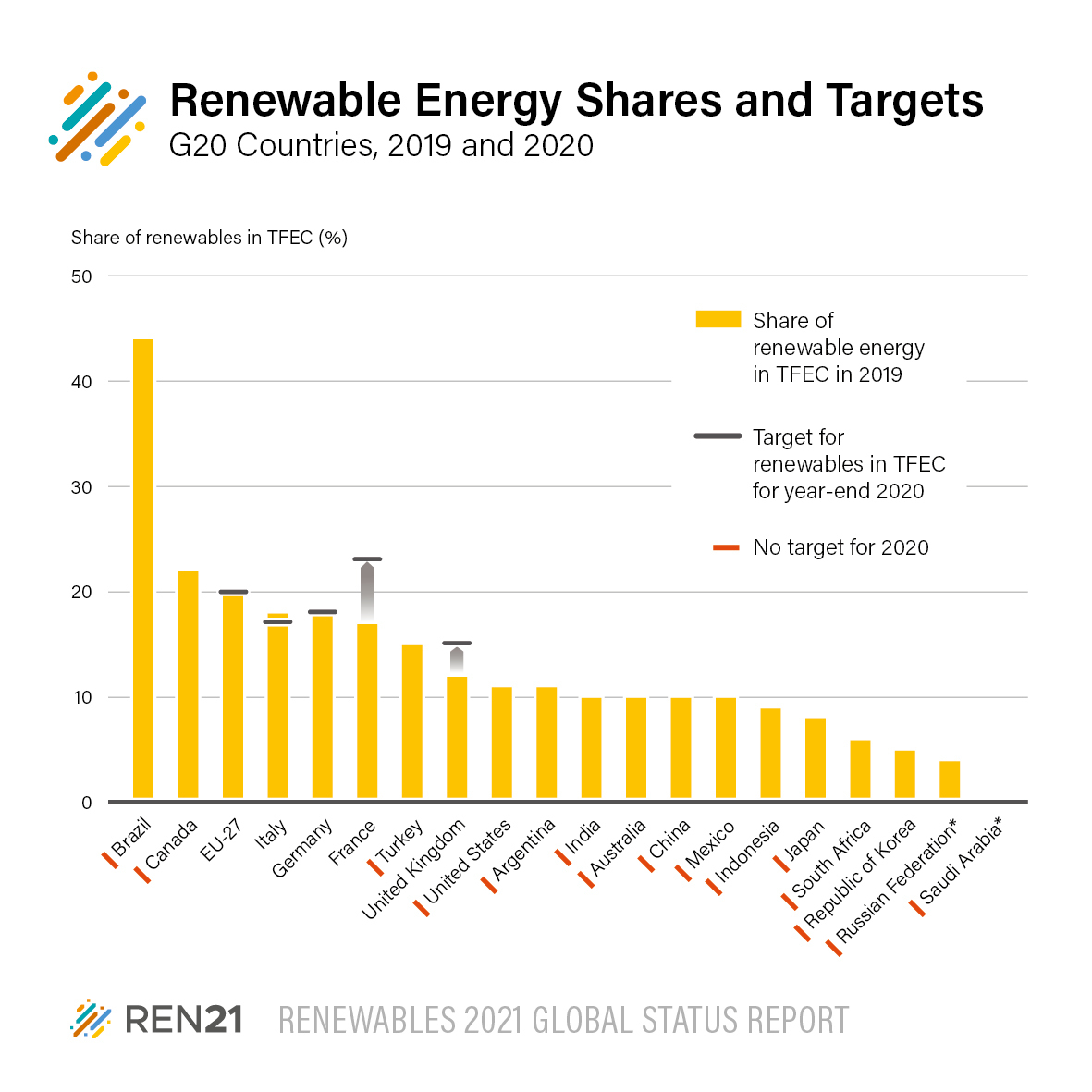
Out of all of the G20, only 5 had set targets for the share of renewable energy, and out of those only 3 were on track to reach those targets (EU-27, Italy, Germany)

The 2021 GSR report found that the share of fossil fuels had not changed in the last decade, with fossil fuels accounting for 80.3% of total final energy use (TFEC) in 2009 versus 80.2% in 2019. Furthermore, the report highlighted that only 5 G20 countries had set targets for the share of renewable energy, with only 3 on track to reach their goals (EU-27, Germany, Italy). Alongside these findings, the organisation called for renewable energy to be a key performance indicator (KPI) in all economic activity.

The GSR report is complemented by a Perspectives Report that presents overarching trends and developments. It outlines what is happening to drive the transition to renewable energy and details why it is not happening fast enough or as fast as possible. This document draws extensively on the data found in the GSR. It is available in multiple languages.

=== Regional Reports ===
The Regional Status Report series focuses on the progress of renewable energy deployment in specific regions. This report series encourages and supports regional data collection as well as informed decision making. Regional status reports have been produced since 2009 and include: China (2009), India (2010), the Middle East and Northern Africa (MENA, 2009), the Economic Community of West African States (ECOWAS, 2014), the Southern African Development Community (SADC, 2015, 2018), the United Nations Economic Commission for Europe (UNECE, 2015, 2017), and the East African Community (EAC, 2016).

=== Thematic Spotlight ===
In its Thematic Spotlight report series, REN21 looks at a certain topics in-depth. Past reports include a publication on mini-grid policies, a ten-year overview of renewable energy developments, tendering and community power in Latin America and the Caribbean, an overview of renewable energy policies in a time of transition (produced with the IEA and IRENA), as well as a publication on decarbonising transport in the G20.

=== Global Futures Report (GFR) ===
The Global Futures Report (GFR) series presents expert views and perspectives on the feasibility and challenges of achieving a world fed by renewable energy. The 2017 report documents global views about the feasibility of achieving a 100% renewable energy future by mid-century. The GFR does not include any forecasts; rather it aims to spur debate about opportunities and challenges of a 100% renewable future.

=== Renewables in Cities Global Status Report (REC) ===
REN21 is currently developing a Renewables in Cities Global Status Report series, which will describe current developments and trends of renewable energy in cities. By offering fact-based evidence, the cities report will be a tool for various stakeholders to inform regulatory frameworks, support city-level commitments, and facilitate better multi-level integration to help shape the debate on cities' transitioning to renewable energy. The second report was released in 2021.

=== REN21 Academy ===
In order to bring together its contributor community, REN21 holds its Renewables Academy. These events offer an environment for contributing new ideas on issues central to the renewable-energy transformation.

REN21's first Renewables Academy was held in 2014, in Bonn, Germany, with 150 participants from 40 countries. Discussions focused on identifying policy drivers needed to advance a global energy transition took place over four plenary sessions and six parallel sessions.

The second Renewables Academy took place in 2018, in Berlin, Germany, with over 160 members from 80 countries meeting to discuss how to accelerate the energy transformation. In 6 plenary sessions, 7 parallel sessions, and 3 workshops, participants collectively addressed complementary themes such as heat, transport, and energy systems 2.0.

== International Renewable Energy Conference (IREC) ==
Initiated at the renewables 2004 conference in Bonn, IREC is held on a biennial basis, hosted by a national government, and convened by REN21.

IRECs have been held in the following countries: Beijing, China (BIREC, 2005); Washington, the United States (WIREC, 2008); Delhi, India (DIREC, 2010); Abu Dhabi, the United Arab Emirates (ADIREC, 2013); South Africa (SAIREC, 2015); and Mexico City, Mexico (MEXIREC, 2017).

== Collaborations with other institutions ==
REN21 works in cooperation with other organizations. A sister report to REN21's GSR is the Global Trends in Renewable Energy Investment Report (GTR) produced by the Frankfurt School – UNEP Collaborating Center for Climate & Sustainable Energy Finance. REN21 is also a partner of the Global Tracking Framework (GTF), which is convened by the UN Secretary General's Sustainable Energy for All (SEforALL) Initiative. REN21 also collaborates closely with other intergovernmental organisations such as the International Energy Agency (IEA), the World Bank and IRENA.

== Members ==
The network includes more than 100 members from industry associations, international organisations, national governments, NGOs, and science and academia. In January 2026, United States President Donald Trump announced that the United States would withdraw from the organization.

== See also ==
- Energy policy
- International Renewable Energy Agency (IRENA)
- International Renewable Energy Alliance (REN Alliance)
- Reegle – an information gateway for renewable energy and energy efficiency
- Renewable Energy and Energy Efficiency Partnership (REEEP)
- Renewable energy commercialization
- United States Climate Alliance
