= Gordon R. England =

American politician and businessman (born 1937)

Gordon England
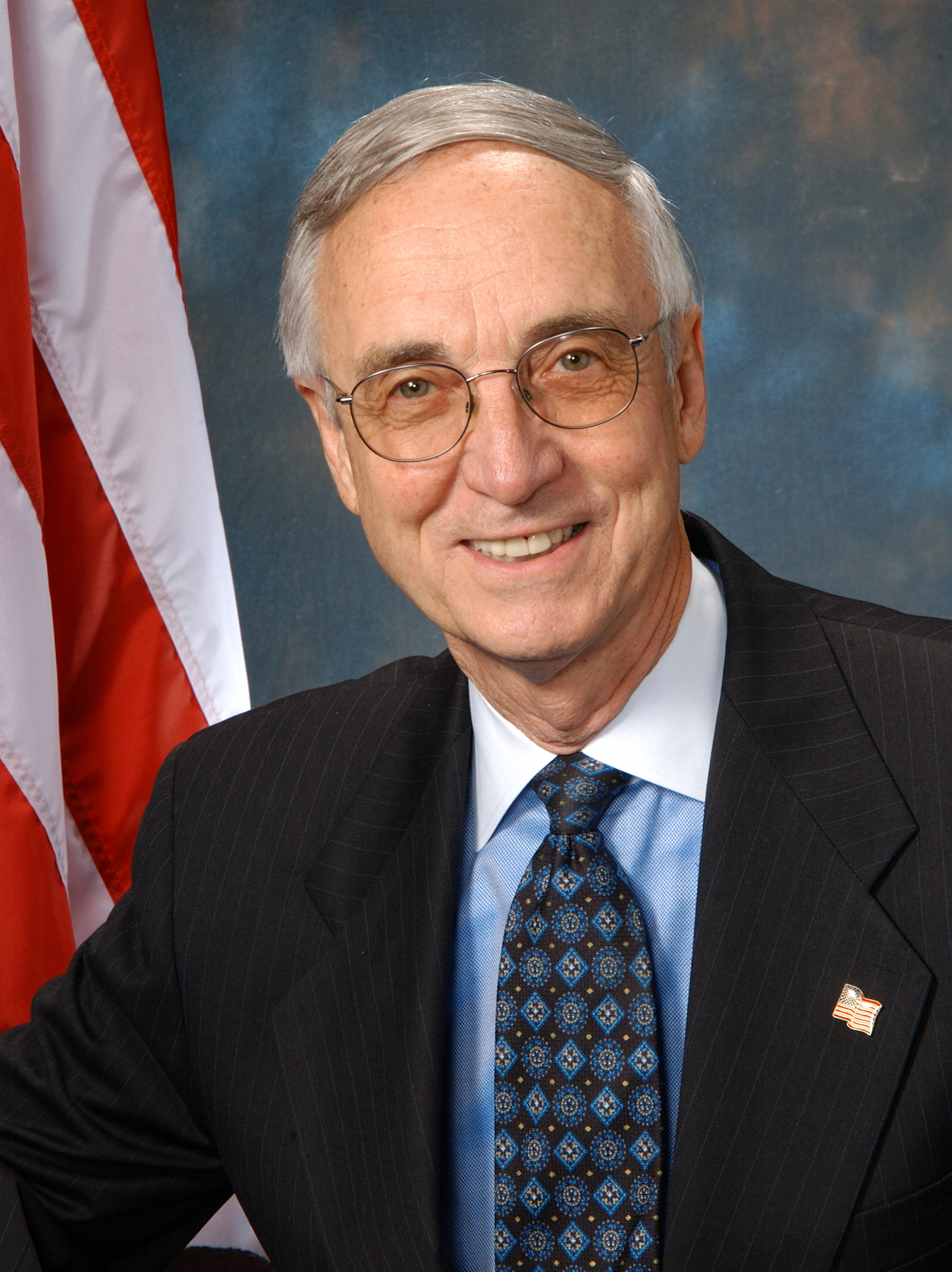
- Official portrait, 2003

29th United States Deputy Secretary of Defense
- In office January 3, 2006 – February 11, 2009; Acting: May 13, 2005 – January 3, 2006
- President: George W. Bush; Barack Obama
- Secretary: Donald Rumsfeld; Robert Gates
- Preceded by: Paul Wolfowitz
- Succeeded by: William J. Lynn III

72nd and 73rd United States Secretary of the Navy
- In office October 1, 2003 – January 3, 2006
- President: George W. Bush
- Preceded by: Himself
- Succeeded by: Donald C. Winter
- In office May 24, 2001 – January 24, 2003
- President: George W. Bush
- Preceded by: Richard Danzig
- Succeeded by: Himself

1st United States Deputy Secretary of Homeland Security
- In office January 24, 2003 – October 1, 2003
- President: George W. Bush
- Preceded by: Position established
- Succeeded by: James Loy

Personal details
- Born: Gordon Richard England; September 15, 1937 (age 89) Baltimore, Maryland, U.S.
- Party: Republican
- Spouse: Dotty England
- Education: University of Maryland, College Park (BS); Texas Christian University (MBA)

Gordon Richard England (born September 15, 1937) is an American politician and businessman who was the U.S. Deputy Secretary of Defense and twice served as the U.S. Secretary of the Navy in the administration of U.S. President George W. Bush.

== Early life ==
England was born on September 15, 1937 in Baltimore, Maryland. England attended Mount Saint Joseph High School, graduating with the class of 1955.

== Education ==
England received a bachelor's degree in electrical engineering from the University of Maryland, College Park in 1961 and an MBA from the Texas Christian University in 1975. He was a member of several fraternities including Beta Gamma Sigma (business), Omicron Delta Kappa (leadership) and Eta Kappa Nu (electrical engineering).

== Career ==
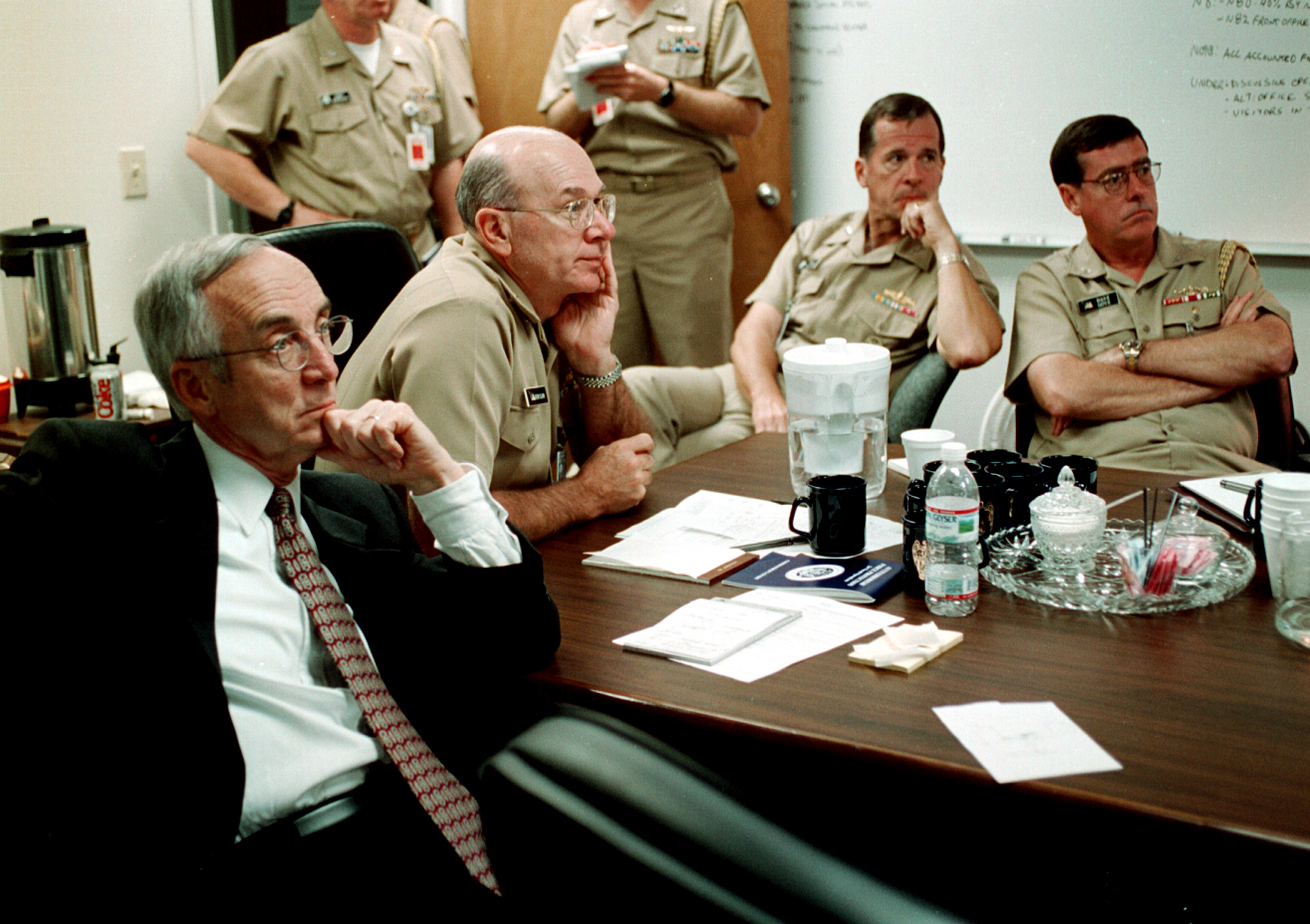
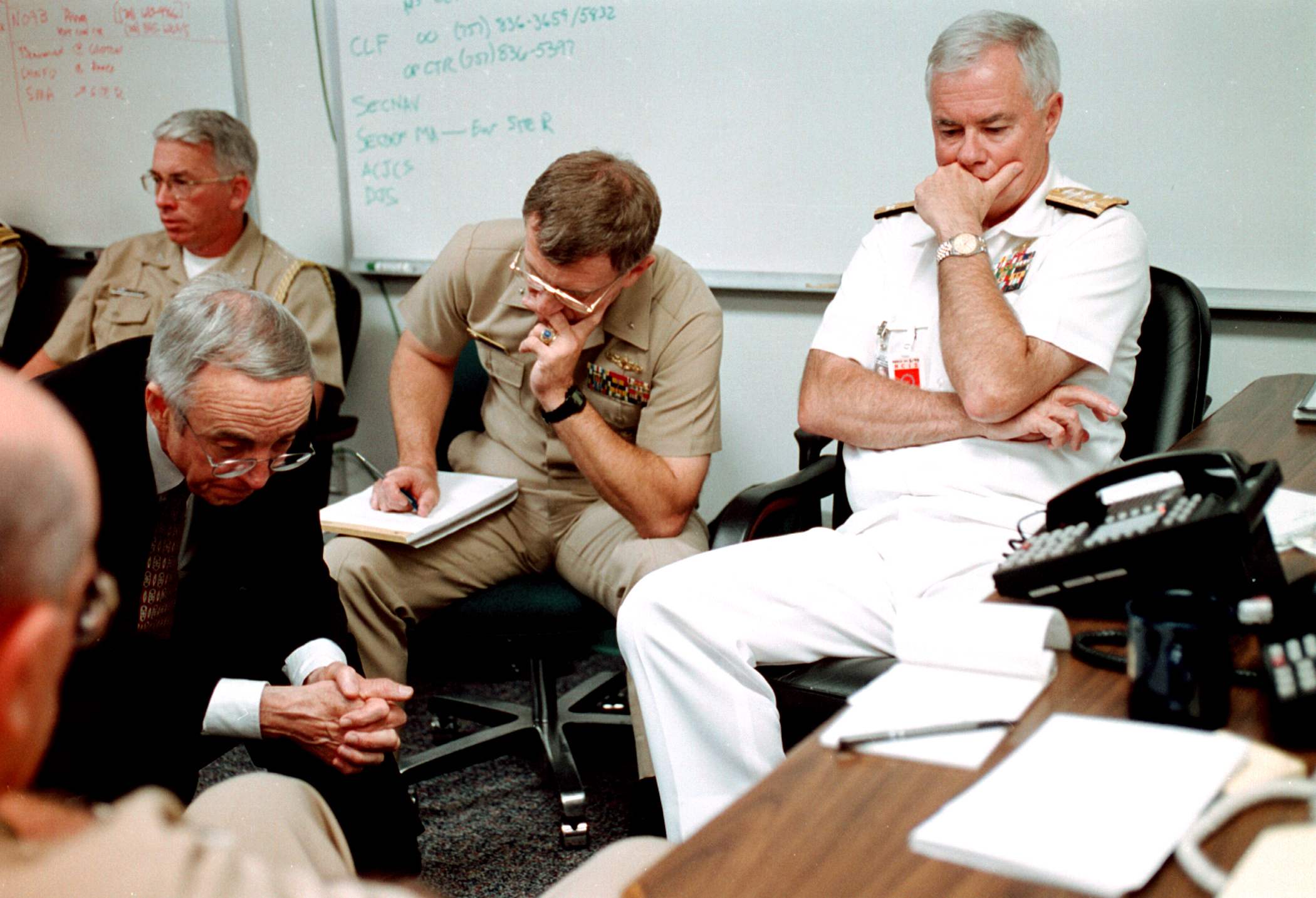
England at the Pentagon during the September 11 attacks in 2001

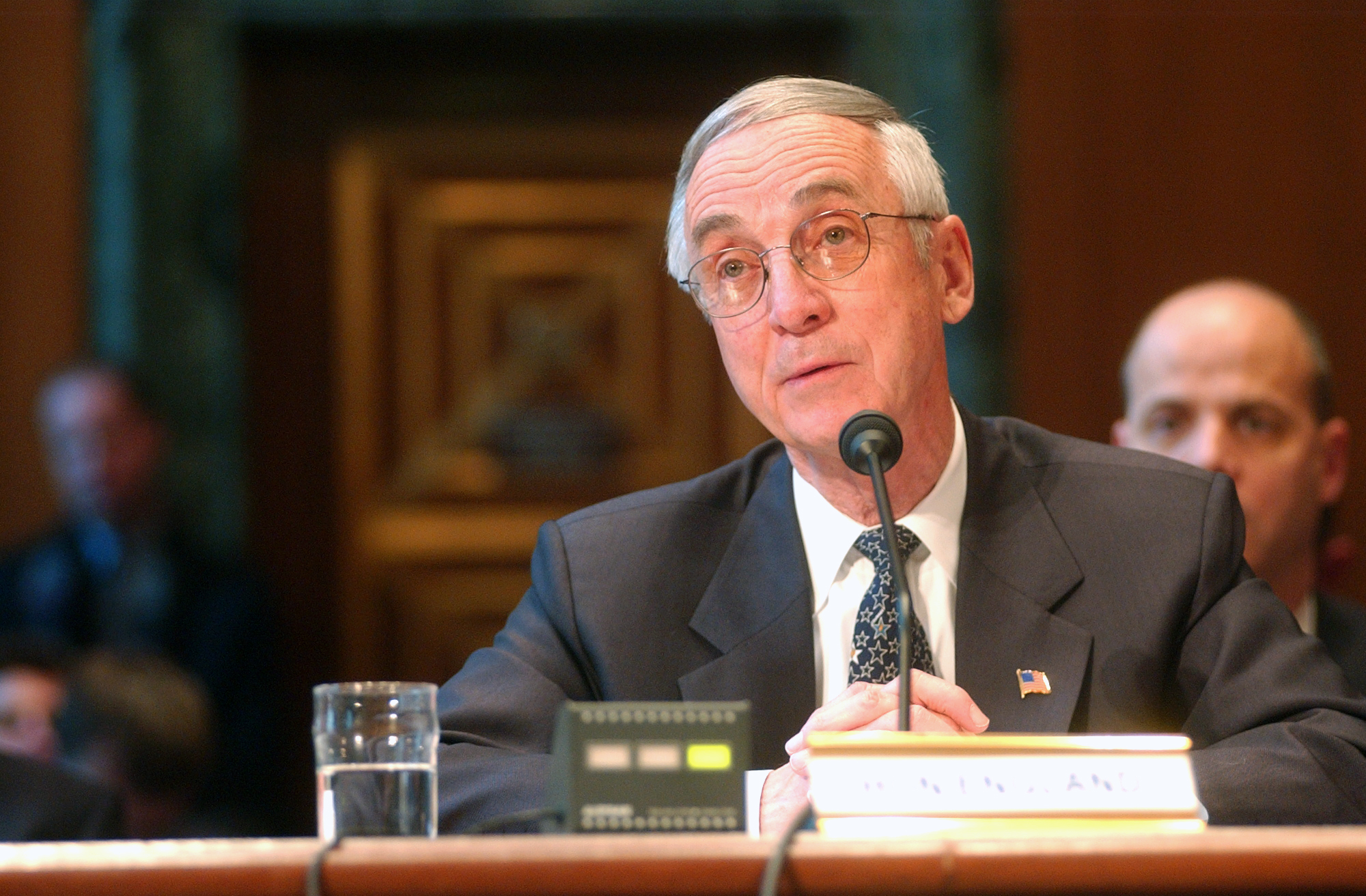
England testifying to the Senate Appropriations Committee

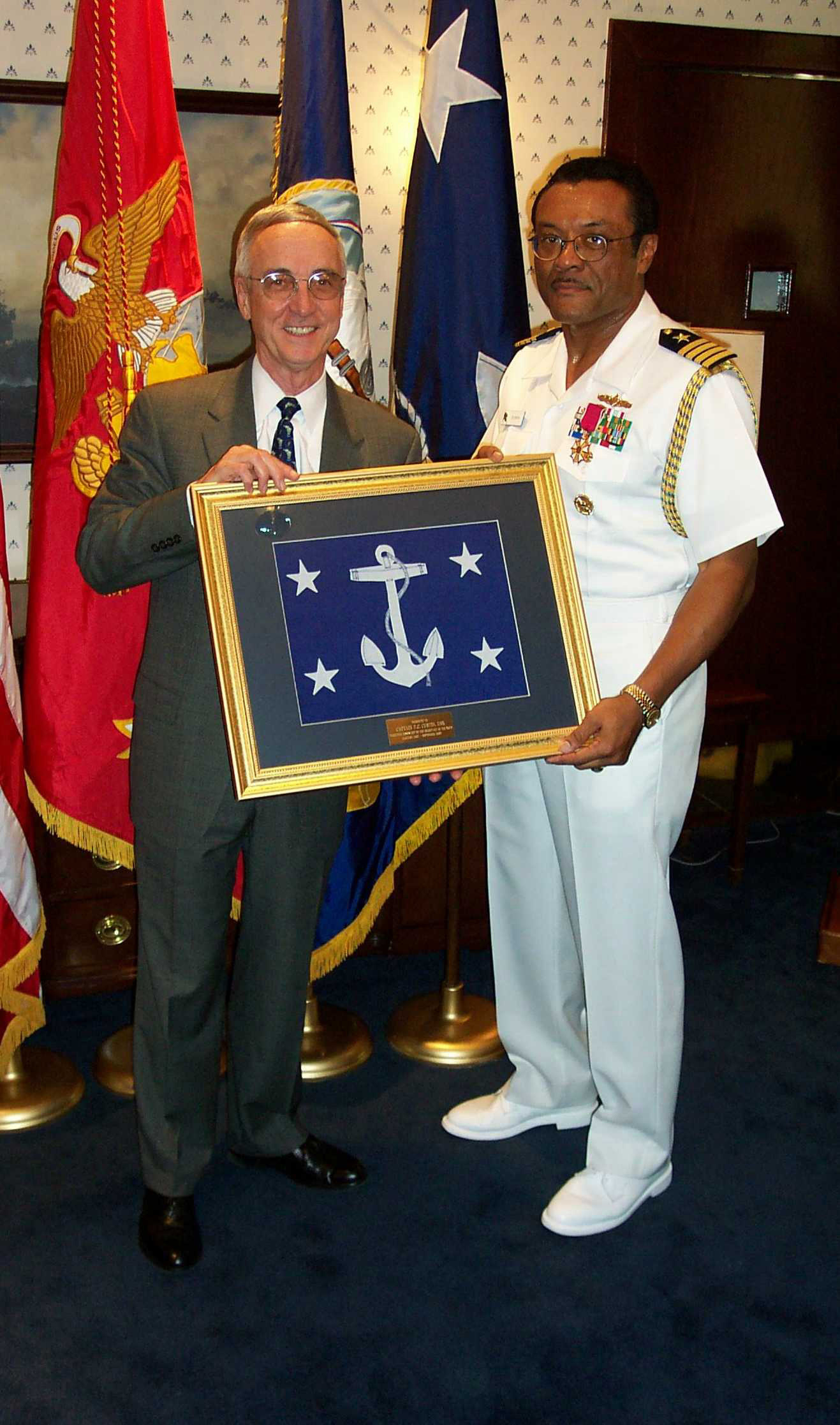
England with D.C. Curtis, August 2002

England started his business career in 1966 at Honeywell where he was an engineer on the Project Gemini space program. He worked for Litton Industries as a program manager on the E-2C Hawkeye aircraft for the United States Navy. He was also CEO of GRE Consultants.

By 1977 he was employed by General Dynamics Fort Worth Division where he held various posts including Director of Avionics. He was later named as the Vice President of Engineering, and later President and general manager, of General Dynamics Land Systems Division, eventually transitioning back to General Dynamics Fort Worth as Division President. England remained in that post when General Dynamics sold the Fort Worth Division to Lockheed; later becoming President of that corporation for four years.

England returned to General Dynamics as Executive Vice President of the Combat Systems Group. He served from 1997 to 2001 as Executive Vice President of General Dynamics where he had overall responsibility for Information Systems and International sectors.

England transferred from the business world to government during the administration of U.S. President George W. Bush serving in a number of key roles, having previously served as a member of the Defense Science Board.

=== 72nd Secretary of the Navy ===
England was a controversial choice for Secretary of the Navy due to his lack of any military service experience and his long career in the defense industry including his most recent appointment as Executive Vice President of General Dynamics Corporation. Critics such as William D. Hartung, Head of the Arms Trade Resource Center, felt that it was inappropriate to appoint businessmen whose companies would be the prime benefactor of any increase in defense spending. U.S. Secretary of Defense Donald Rumsfeld however had decided to make corporate experience one of the key requirements in his appointees as was reported in the Washington Times. This policy led to England's appointment alongside other leading industrialists including James Roche and Thomas E. White. England was sworn in on May 24, 2001. He is reported in The Washington Post as having announced that one of his key aims in the role was the development of "futuristic weapons to counter new types of threats emerging in the post-Soviet world."

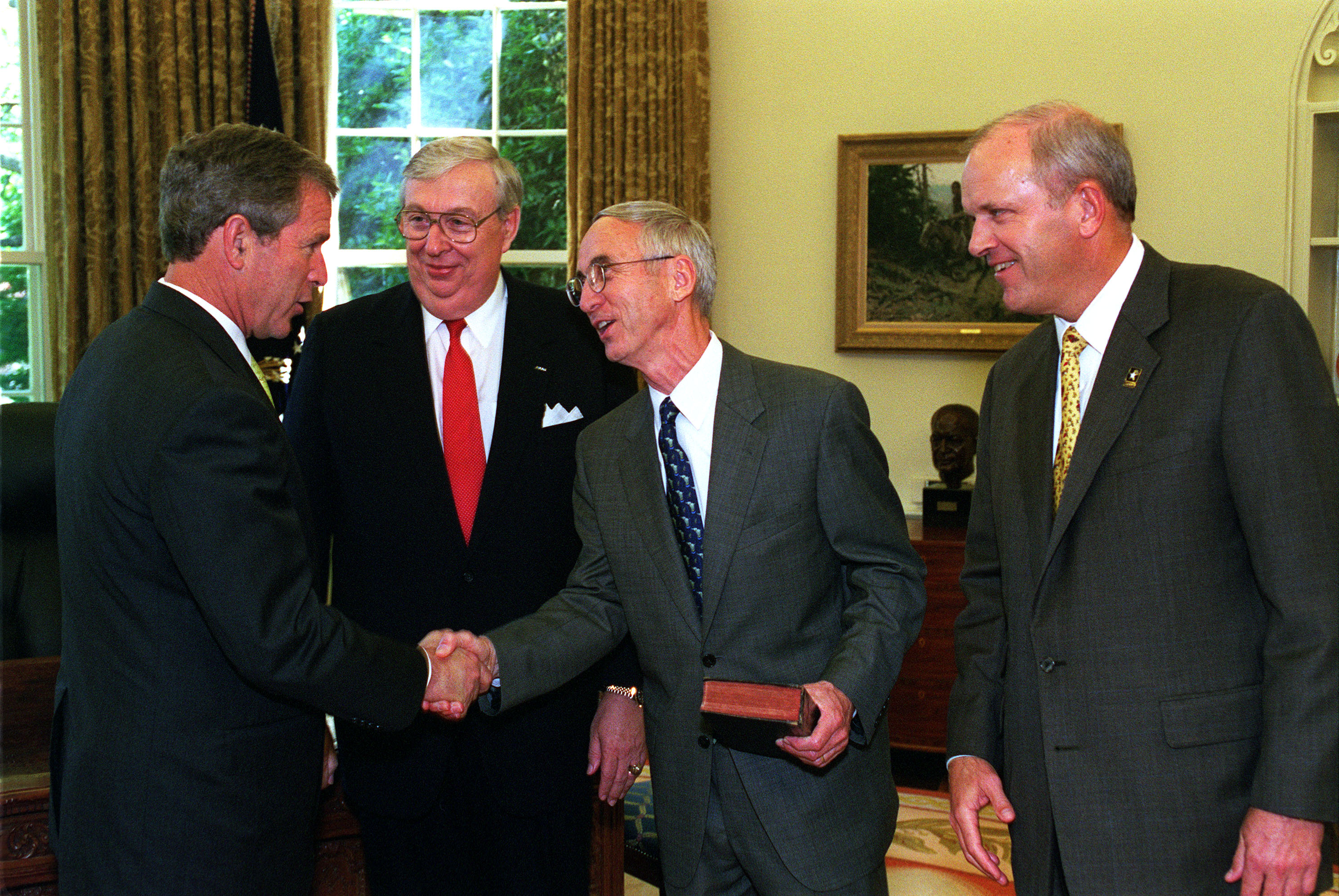
President Bush with England, James Roche, and Thomas E. White

The Washington Post reports that during his time in this role "England has joined with Adm. Vernon Clark, chief of naval operations, in directing some of the most sweeping change the service has seen in decades." The report goes on to list the following;

- Retiring dozens of ships
- Shedding thousands of jobs,
- Consolidating Navy and Marine Corps tactical aviation forces
- Juggling crew deployments to keep some ships at sea longer
- Devising plans to surge more warships into action faster during a crisis.

By an instruction dated May 31, 2002, England directed all United States Navy ships to fly the first navy jack in honor of those killed in the September 11, 2001 attacks. The jack is to be flown for the duration of the war on terrorism.

England left the post in January 2003 for a new position within the administration.

=== 1st Deputy Secretary for Homeland Security ===
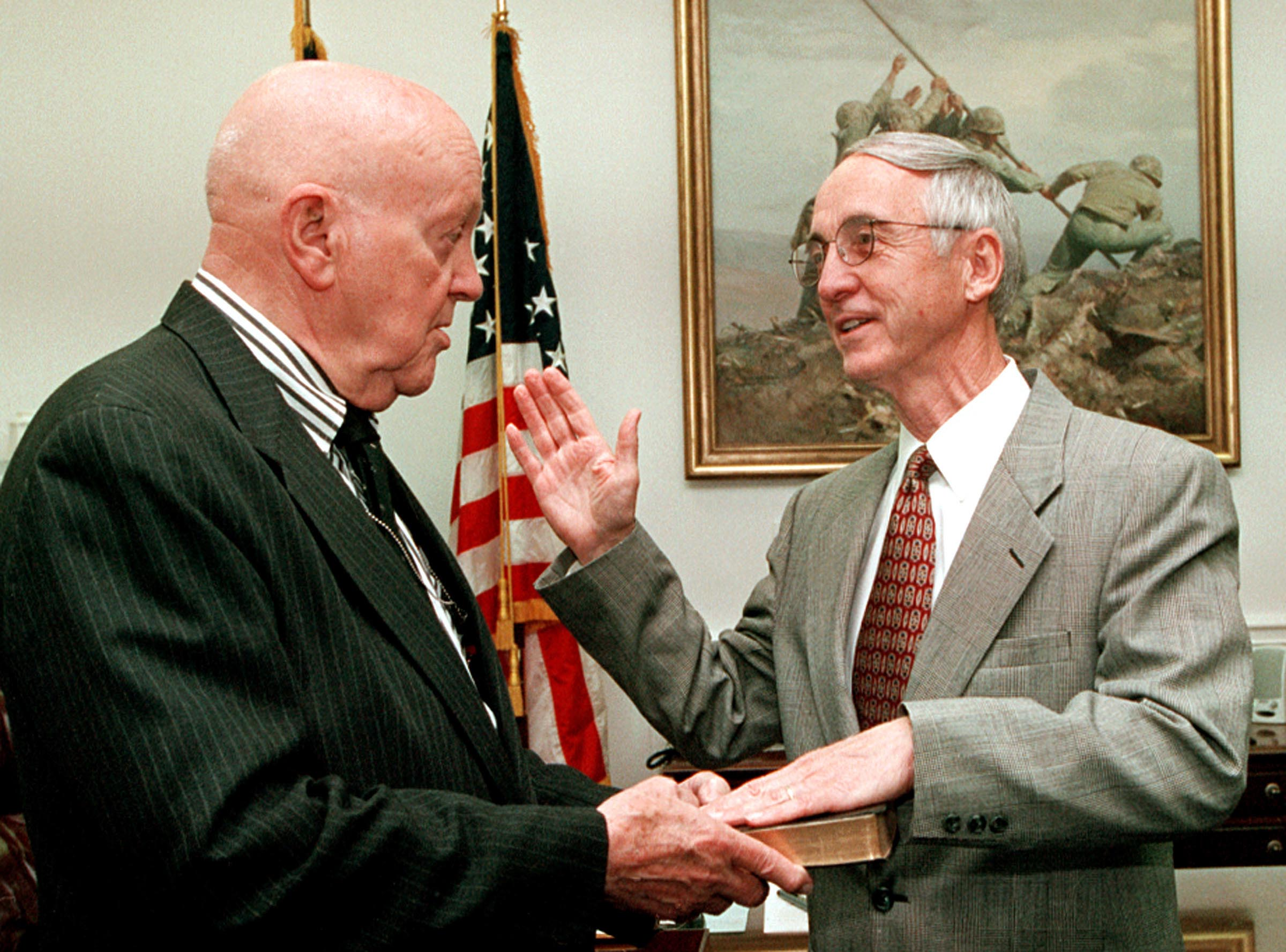
England is sworn in by David O. Cooke as Secretary of the Navy

On January 24, 2003, England took up his new role as Deputy Secretary for Homeland Security in the newly formed United States Department of Homeland Security. Although England's stint in this post was brief, a close associate quoted in The Washington Post states that it "broadened his exposure to the White House and his 'contact base' in Washington."

=== 73rd Secretary of the Navy ===
England was recalled to once again take on the role of Secretary of the Navy after just a few months following the suicide of his nominated replacement Colin R. McMillan. England was sworn in on October 1, 2003, becoming only the second person to hold the post twice and the first to serve back-to-back terms. According to a close associate quoted in The Washington Post, England's time in the United States Department of Homeland Security had "expanded [his] view of the administration's war on terrorism", which led to a number of initiatives that he pursued in his second term at the Pentagon including stronger ties between the Navy and Coast Guard and a greater assistance to marines on the front lines in Iraq.

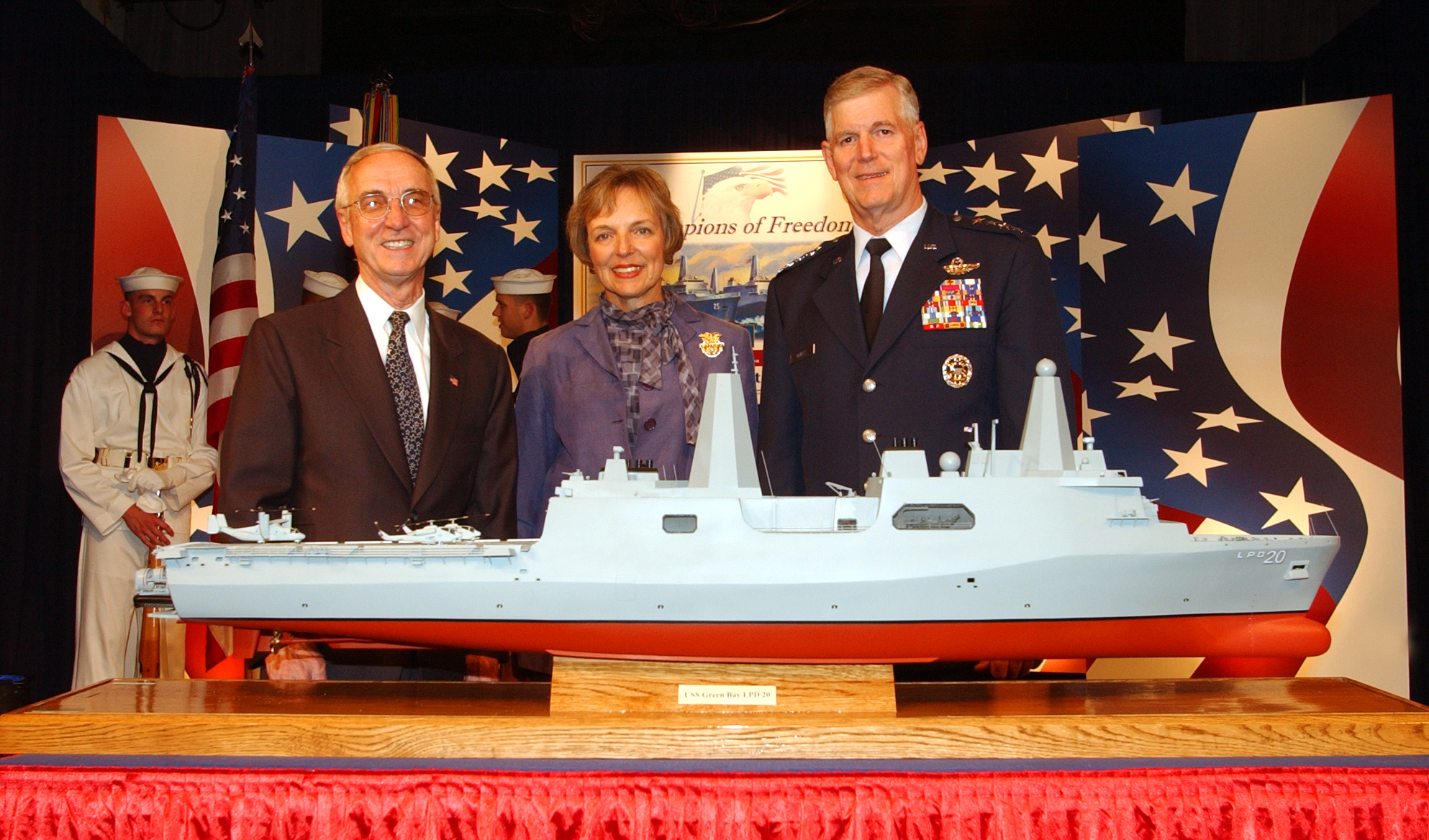
England with Chairman of The Joint Chiefs of Staff General Richard B. Myers and his wife Mary Jo Myers pose next to a model of a San Antonio-class amphibious dock landing ship (LPD) USS Somerset (LPD 25).

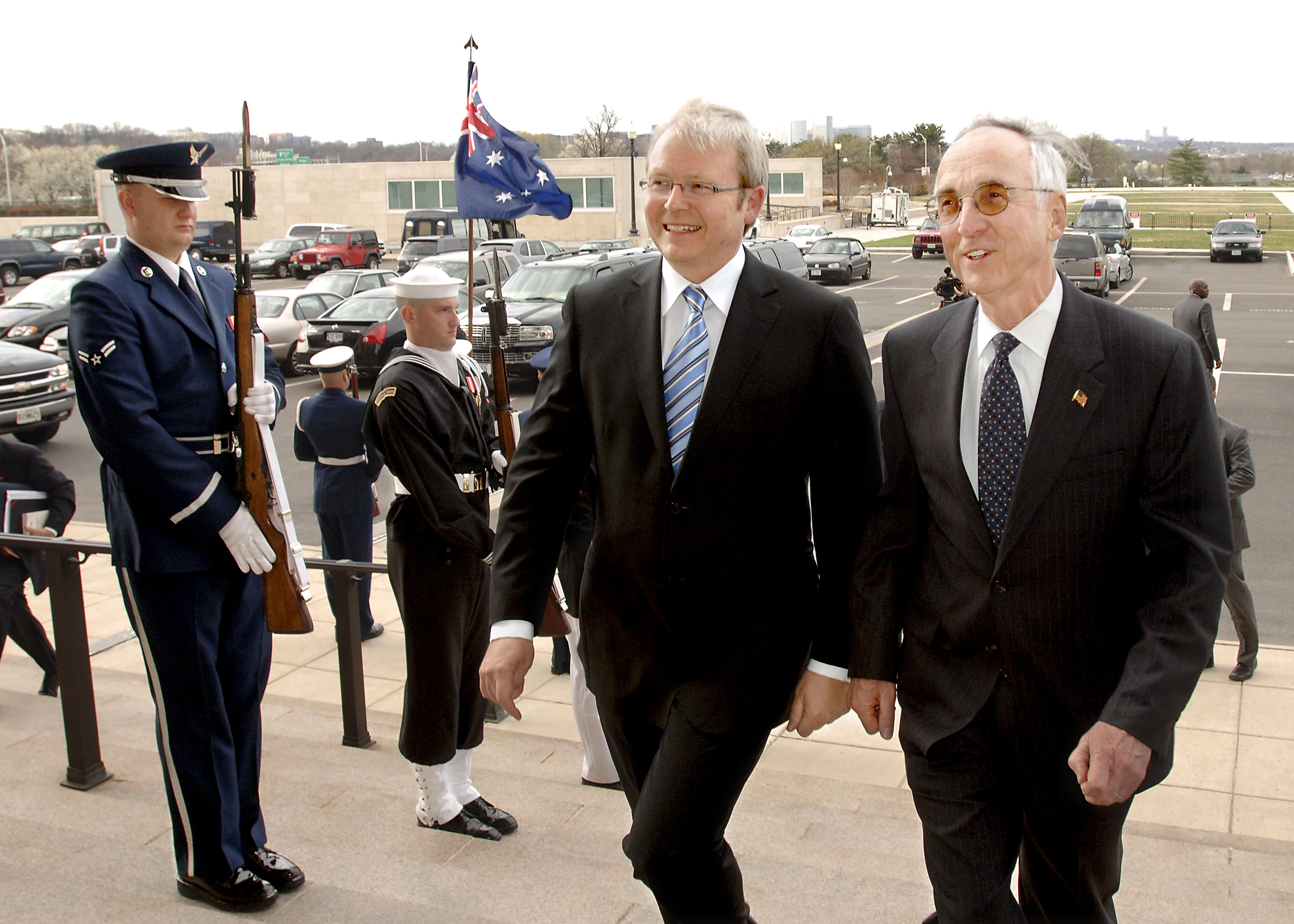
England with Australian Prime Minister Kevin Rudd in March 2008

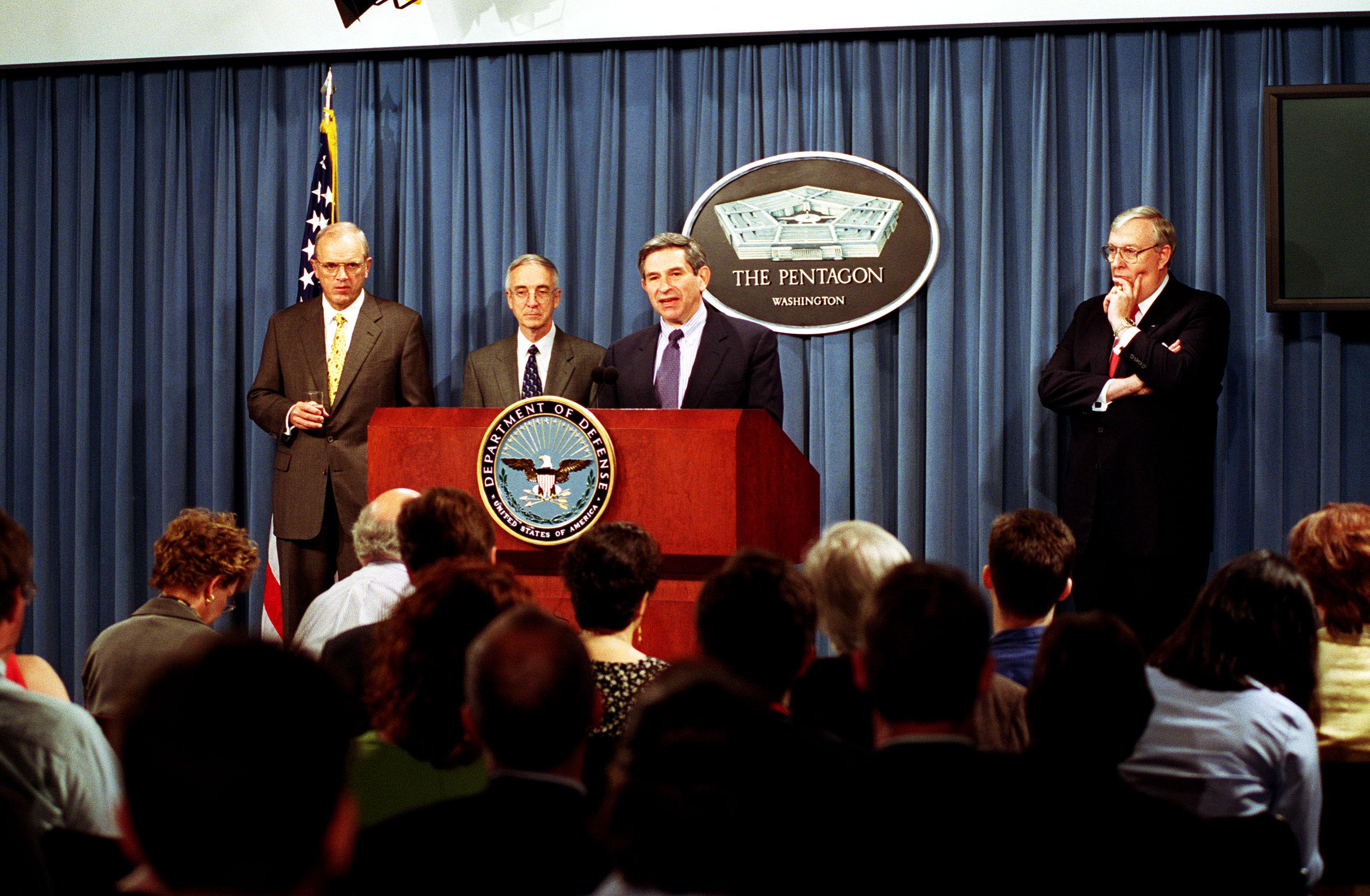
England (second from left) at press conference with Paul Wolfowitz, James Roche and Thomas E. White

In June 2004, a Supreme Court ruling granted prisoners at Guantanamo Bay, Cuba the right to plead their cases in U.S. courts. As the BBC pointed out the 600 detainees had been in legal limbo since their capture during the 2001 invasion of Afghanistan, during which time only three detainees had been charged and several dozen had been sent back home following diplomatic pressure from other nations. England was appointed to head the review that was conducted in secret by a panel consisting of three military officers to whom prisoners were given the chance to provide facts to support their case for release. England made clear that "The question is: Are they still threats to America? It's not guilt or innocence." As a result of this review 38 prisoners were released due to a lack of evidence that England referred to as ‘thin files’.

England was succeeded as Secretary of the Navy by Donald C. Winter.

=== Deputy Secretary of Defense ===
England was nominated as Deputy Secretary of Defense on May 13, 2005, and immediately took up the role in an acting capacity while awaiting his confirmation. His replacement of Paul Wolfowitz has been looked upon favorably in the media with The Washington Post commenting, "England has a reputation for being less ideological than Wolfowitz and more attuned to the administrative demands of the Pentagon's second-ranking civilian job'" but critics still maintain that his prime loyalty remains to the defense industry. England was recess appointed to the Deputy Secretary position on January 4, 2006, by President Bush.

=== Acting Secretary of Defense ===
On January 22, 2009, Secretary of Defense Robert Gates told reporters he would hand off his duties to England during his January 23 surgery. On January 23, 2009, while Gates underwent two hours of surgery to repair a torn tendon in his left biceps, England was in charge of the Pentagon. England continued this service while Gates recovered from the surgery. During this time, England was the acting Defense Secretary.

== Other activities and awards ==
England has been involved with various civic, charitable and government organizations. He was a city councilman, as well as vice-chair on the board of Goodwill Industries. He was on the USO's Board of Governors, the Defense Science Board, the Board of Visitors at Texas Christian University, and others.

He has been recognized for numerous professional and service contributions from multiple organizations such as Distinguished Alumnus Award from the University of Maryland; the Department of Defense Distinguished Public Service Award; the Silver Beaver Award from the Boy Scouts of America; the Silver Knight of Management Award from the National Management Association; the Henry M. Jackson Award and the IEEE Centennial Award.

England was elected a member of the National Academy of Engineering in 2012 for advances in digital avionics for aircraft, land, and naval platforms. He is also a member of the Naval Order of the United States.

England is a member of the United States Naval Institute and a former Chair of the Naval Institute Foundation. He made a naming donation to the Naval Institute's Jack C. Taylor Conference Center that opened on 30 September 2021.

== Notes ==
Government offices
Preceded by Robert B. Pirie, Jr. (acting)	United States Secretary of the Navy; May 2001 – January 2003	Succeeded by Susan Livingstone (acting)
Preceded by Hansford T. Johnson (acting)	United States Secretary of the Navy; October 2003 – January 2006	Succeeded by Donald C. Winter
Political offices
Preceded by New office	United States Deputy Secretary of Homeland Security; January 2003 – September 2003	Succeeded by James Loy
Preceded by Paul Wolfowitz	United States Deputy Secretary of Defense; January 4, 2006 – January 20, 2009	Succeeded by William Lynn
