= William J. Lynn III =

American politician (born 1954)

Bill Lynn
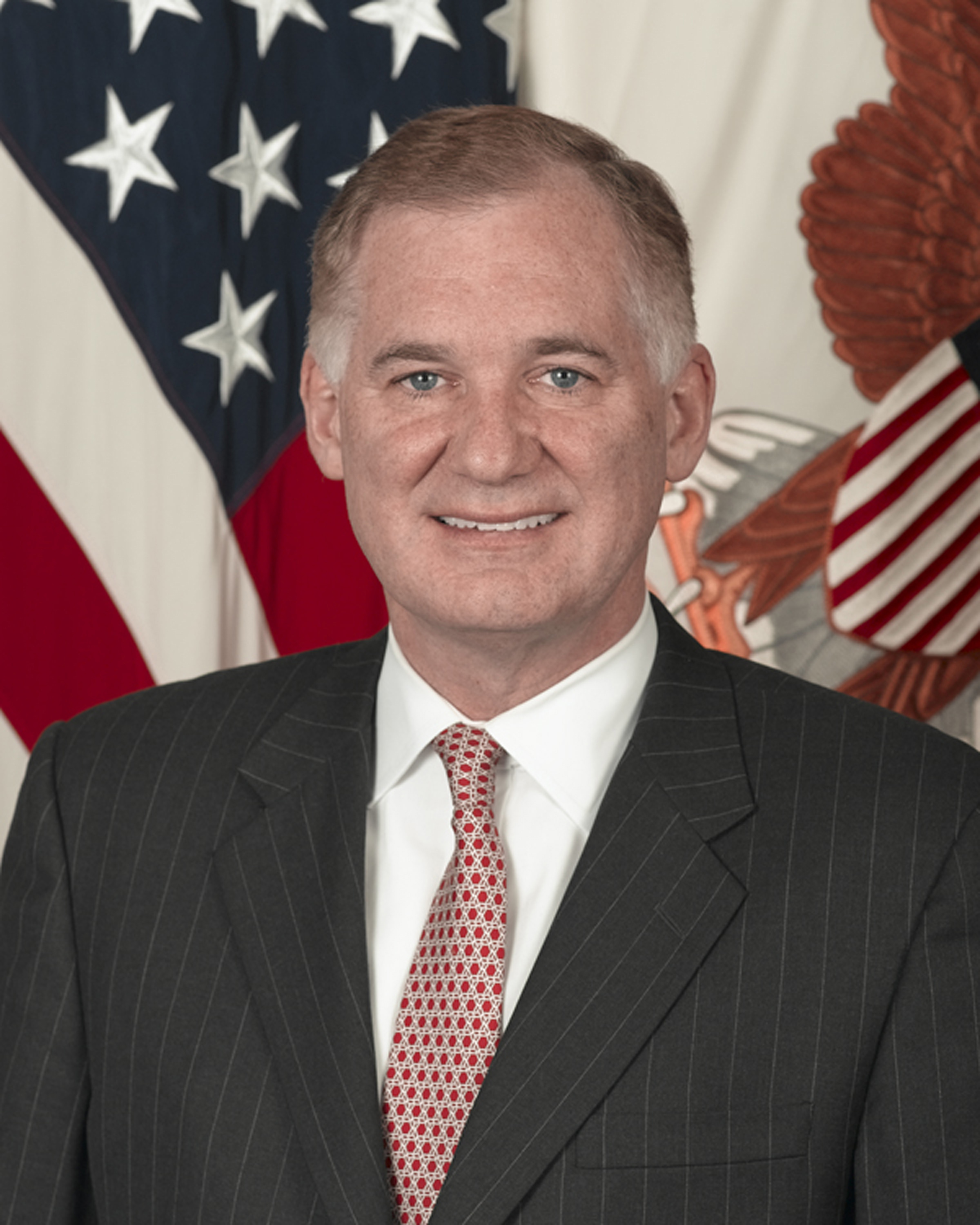
- Official portrait, 2009

30th United States Deputy Secretary of Defense
- In office February 12, 2009 – October 5, 2011
- President: Barack Obama
- Secretary: Robert Gates; Leon Panetta
- Preceded by: Gordon R. England
- Succeeded by: Ash Carter

2nd Under Secretary of Defense (Comptroller)/CFO
- In office November 19, 1997 – January 20, 2001
- President: Bill Clinton
- Preceded by: John Hamre
- Succeeded by: Dov S. Zakheim

Personal details
- Born: January 1, 1954 (age 72) Key West, Florida, U.S.
- Party: Democratic
- Spouse: Mary Murphy
- Education: Dartmouth College (BA); Cornell University (JD); Princeton University (MPA)

William James Lynn III (born January 1, 1954) is a former United States Deputy Secretary of Defense. Before that he was Under Secretary of Defense (Comptroller) and a lobbyist for Raytheon.

== Life and career ==
Lynn was born in Key West, Florida and raised in Connecticut, graduating from New Canaan High School in June 1972. He graduated from Dartmouth College with a B.A. degree in 1976. He earned a Juris Doctor degree from Cornell Law School in 1980 and a Master of Public Affairs degree from the Woodrow Wilson School at Princeton University in 1982. Lynn was hired by the Center for Strategic and International Studies, where he served as executive director of the Defense Organization Project from 1982 to 1985. That last year, he and Barry Blechman published the book Toward a More Effective Defense. At some point, he was a senior fellow studying strategic nuclear forces and arms control at the National Defense University's Strategic Concepts Development Center, and went on to be the legislative counsel for defense and arms control matters for Massachusetts Senator Edward Kennedy between 1987 and 1993. During this time, he also worked as Kennedy's staff representative on the Committee on Armed Services.

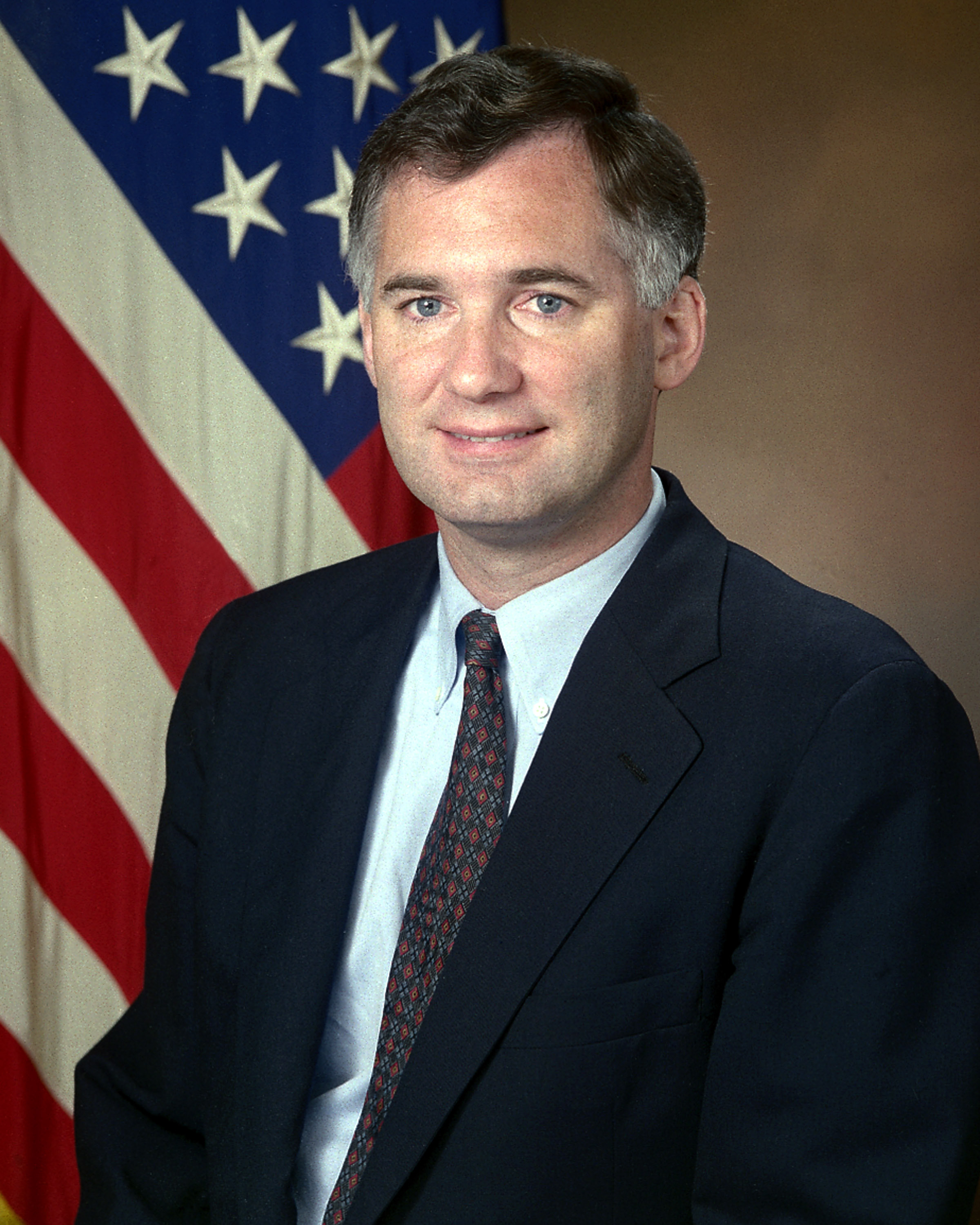
Lynn as Under Secretary of Defense (Comptroller)

Lynn later worked as an assistant to the Secretary of Defense for Budget, and in April 1993 joined the office of the Secretary of Defense (then Les Aspin) to be director for program analysis and evaluation. On October 21, 1997, President Bill Clinton nominated Lynn to be Under Secretary of Defense (Comptroller), and after a Senate confirmation on November 13, he was sworn in on November 19.

After leaving at the end of the Clinton Administration, Lynn became the executive vice president of the management consulting firm DFI International in 2001, but left in August 2002 when he was hired by the Raytheon Company, where he held the title senior vice president of Government Operations and Strategy.

Lynn is a member of the Atlantic Council's board of directors.

=== Deputy Secretary of Defense ===
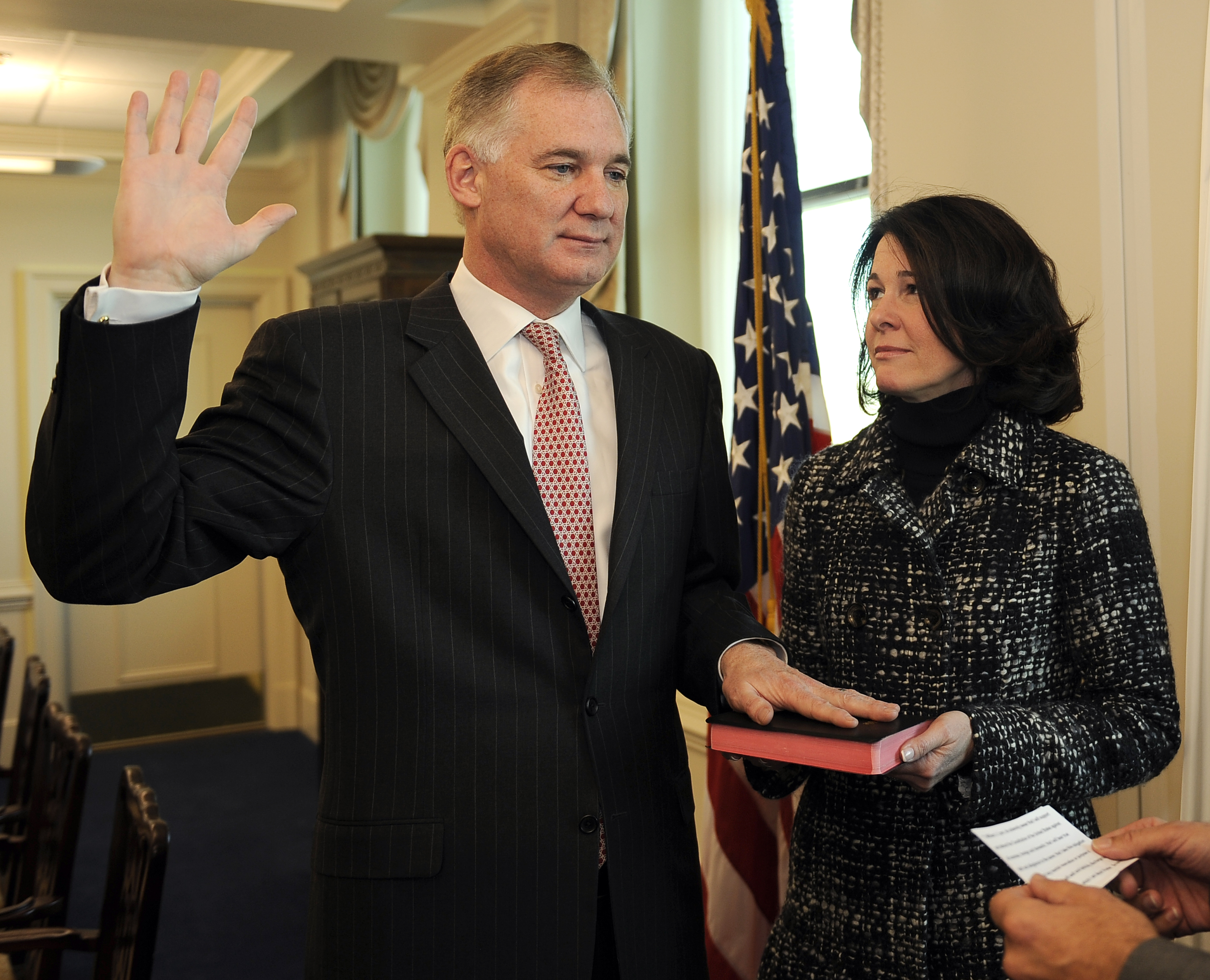
Lynn being sworn in as Deputy Secretary of Defense, accompanied by his wife.

On January 8, 2009, President-elect Barack Obama nominated Lynn as his Deputy Secretary of Defense. This was complicated by the fact that new ethic rules promulgated by Obama for members of his administration created a waiting period of two years between lobbying activities and working for the administration on the same issues, which Lynn's work with Raytheon violated. President Obama waived the new rules for Lynn, which received criticism from John McCain as well as outside groups such as the Project on Government Oversight, Citizens for Responsibility and Ethics in Washington, Government Accountability Project, and Public Citizen. McCain later said that the nomination should probably move forward. As nominee, Lynn agreed to sell his holdings of Raytheon stock. Lynn's appointment was approved by the U.S. Senate Armed Services Committee on February 5, 2009, by unanimous consent. On February 11, 2009, Lynn was confirmed in the full Senate by a vote of 93–4. He took the oath of office on February 12.

In May 2009, Lynn cautioned Congress and the Obama administration about overhauling the Pentagon's weapons-buying practices. "We need to keep in mind the importance of not making the system worse in our efforts to achieve reform," he said in testimony prepared for the House Armed Services Committee. "This has happened in the past."

Lynn told lawmakers the Pentagon would hire 20,000 new people, starting in October 2009, to manage weapons acquisition, which he called "aggressive," but necessary to bring in program managers, cost estimators, software engineers and systems engineers. "We are mindful it is going to be an organizational challenge," he said.

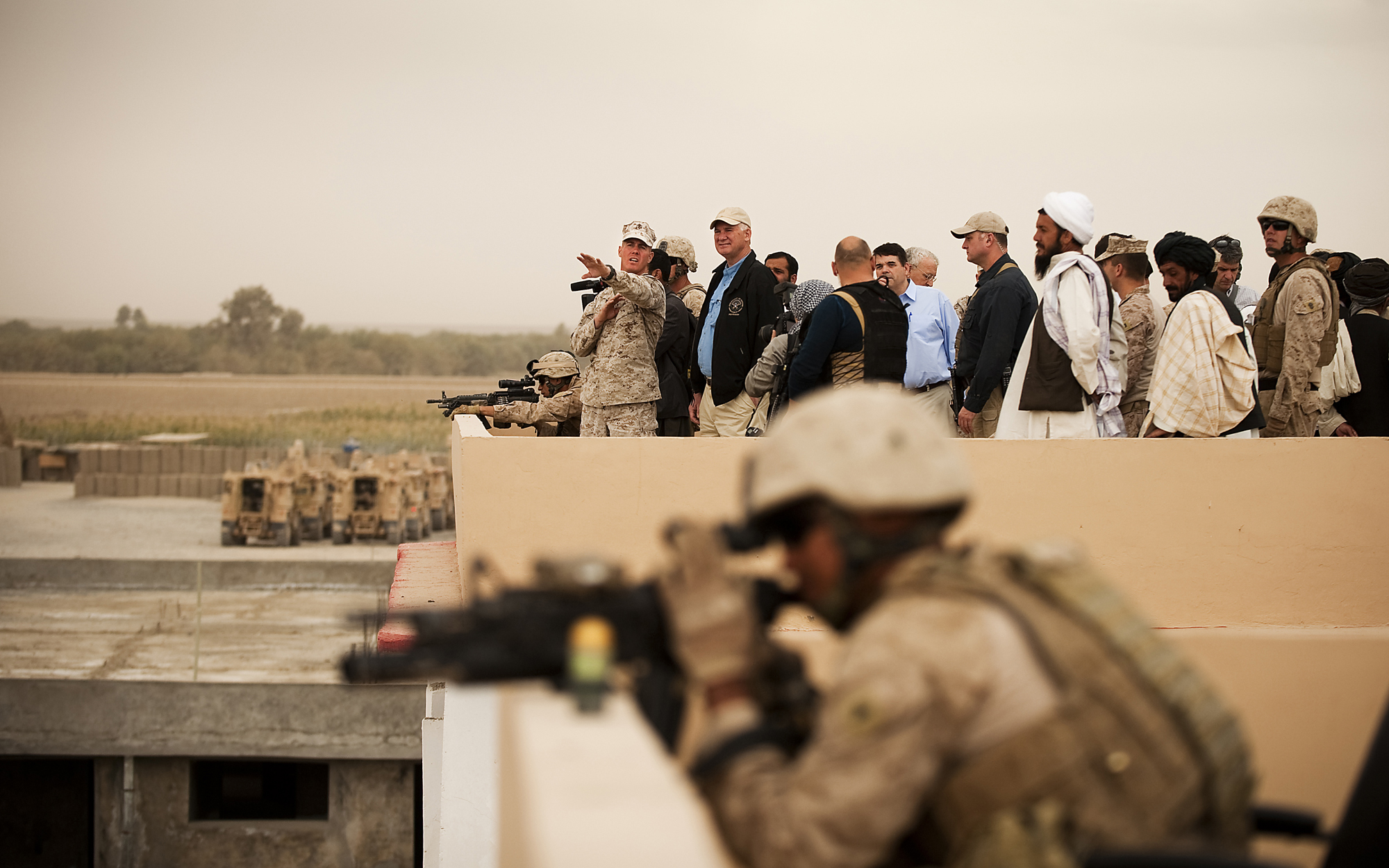
Lynn touring Marine positions in Afghanistan.

Pentagon leaders began an effort to save about $100 billion over five years to maintain fighting forces and to modernize weapons. In June 2010, Lynn said the goal is to find more savings within the defense budget without cutting the top-line number. Pentagon leaders are eying 2 to 3 percent real growth in the Pentagon's budget for the areas that need it most: force structure and modernization. Two-thirds of the $100 billion cost savings spread out over the next five years will come from trimming overhead on a department-wide basis. That money will be directly transferred into the force structure and modernization accounts, Lynn explained. The rest of the cost savings would come from "developing efficiencies within those force structure and modernization accounts," he added. "If we're able to reduce overhead accounts where we don't need those increases, shift it to the force structure and modernization accounts, we can get that 2 to 3 percent [real growth] and we can do what we think we need to do in technology refresh, modernization, protecting quality of life and all those critical factors."

Lynn warned that in order to get to the $100 billion in savings the Pentagon leaders and the military services will have to identify "lower priority programs" that are not going to be part of future budgets.

On January 6, 2011, Defense Secretary Robert Gates outlined the $100 billion over the five fiscal years (2012-16) to be spent on military capabilities, plus additional 5-year savings worth $78 billion designed to contribute to deficit reduction. These include, among other things, the consolidation of numbered air force staff, the disestablishment of JFCOM and the Second Fleet, Air Mobility Command fuel savings, multi-year procurement policies, and cancellations of hundreds of report requirements (many of them dating back to the 1950s).

In May 2011 Lynn indicated that the department is moving to balance how much it invests in counterinsurgency versus more traditional military capabilities. "I think you can decide which of those two you want to emphasize," said William Lynn. "I don't think you can eliminate either. I don't think that's possible." Lynn said the wars in Iraq and Afghanistan have been more difficult than had been expected, but the U.S. military must have enough troops and the right kind of training, equipment and family support for future long conflicts, which he said are still "plausible."

In July Lynn announced that he would leave DoD. "Bill Lynn has provided outstanding advice and counsel to this department and to the nation over the course of his long career," Leon Panetta said in a statement released on 7 July. "I will rely on his experience and expertise during this transition period. His service will be greatly missed." He left his office on October 5, 2011.

On January 26, 2012, DRS Technologies announced Lynn's selection to lead Finmeccanica's efforts in the U.S. and as such has been elected chairman of the board and chief executive officer of DRS Technologies.

Political offices
Preceded by Gordon R. England	United States Deputy Secretary of Defense; 2009–2011	Succeeded by Ash Carter
