= Susan Livingstone =

American government official (born 1946)

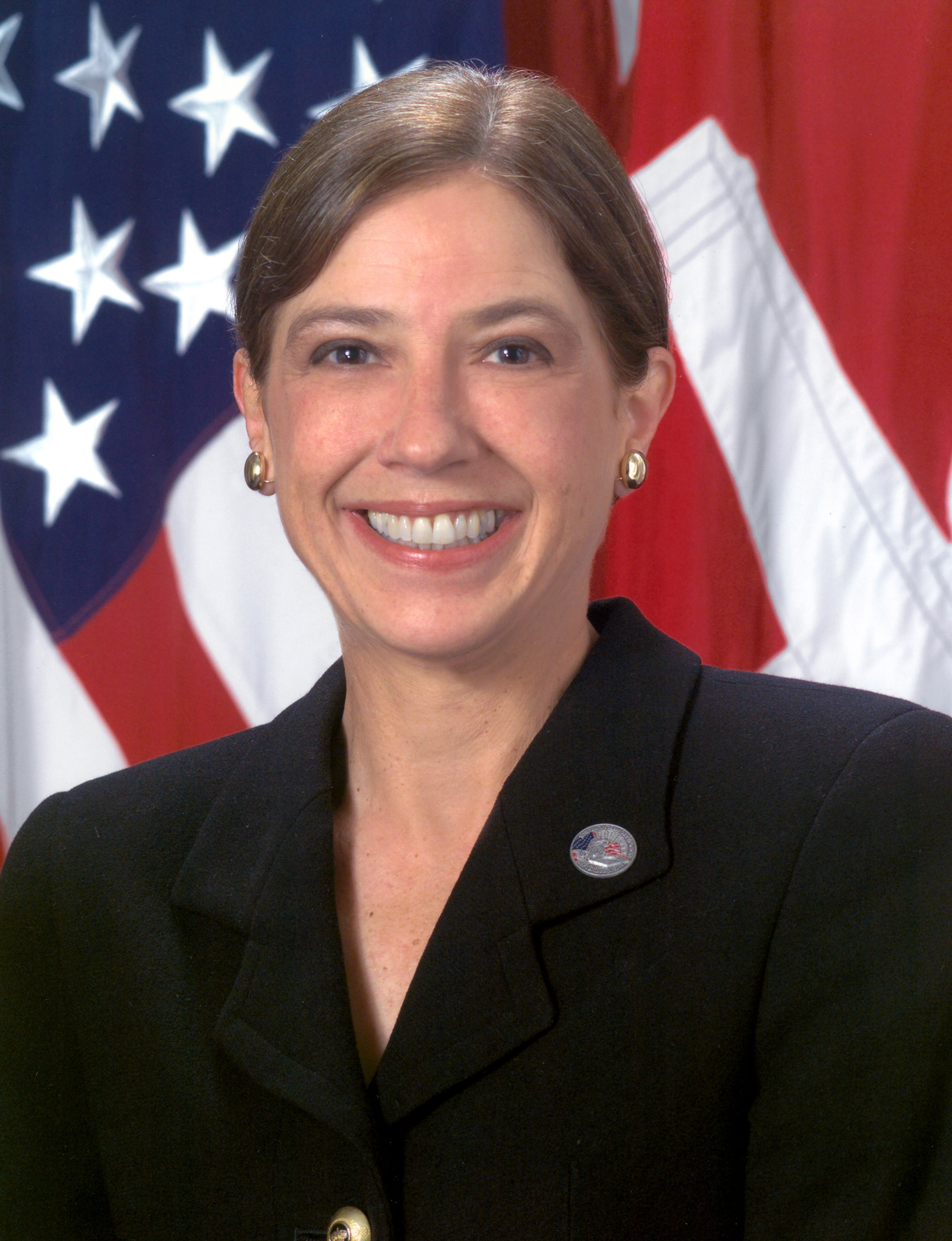

United States Secretary of the Navy
- Acting
- In office January 30, 2003 – February 7, 2003
- President: George W. Bush
- Preceded by: Gordon R. England
- Succeeded by: Hansford T. Johnson (acting)

United States Undersecretary of the Navy
- In office July 26, 2001 – February 28, 2003
- President: George W. Bush
- Preceded by: Robert B. Pirie Jr.
- Succeeded by: Dionel M. Aviles

Personal details
- Born: January 13, 1946 (age 80) Carthage, Missouri, U.S.
- Party: Republican
- Education: College of William & Mary (BA); University of Montana (MA); Tufts University (MA)

Susan Morrisey Livingstone (born January 13, 1946) is an American retired politician who briefly served as the first female Acting United States Secretary of the Navy from January 24 to February 7, 2003. Livingstone also served as Under Secretary of the Navy under President George W. Bush from 2001 to 2003.

Livingstone played a crucial role in the effort to end coercive and abusive interrogation tactics at U.S. Naval Base Guantanamo Bay, Cuba. At the time, as Under Secretary of the Navy, Livingstone oversaw a large management portfolio, which included lawyers in the Navy General Counsel's office and investigators at the Naval Criminal Investigative Service who raised concerns about the treatment of detainees at Guantanamo Bay Naval Base.

== Early life ==
Livingstone was a native of Carthage, Missouri and grew up in an Air Force family. She graduated from the College of William and Mary in 1968 with an A.B. degree and completed an M.A. in political science at the University of Montana in 1972. She also held a graduate degree from the Fletcher School of Law and Diplomacy.

== Government career ==
Livingstone served at the Veterans Administration from 1981 to 1989 in a number of positions, including Associate Deputy Administrator for Logistics and the Associate Deputy Administrator for Management. Prior to her Executive Branch service, Livingstone worked for more than nine years in the Legislative branch on the personal staffs of both a Senator and two Congressmen.

From 1989 to 1993, during the George H. W. Bush administration, Livingstone served as Assistant Secretary of the Army (Installations, Energy and Environment). In that position, her responsibilities included military construction, installation management, energy and environmental issues, domestic disaster relief and restoration of public infrastructure to the people of Kuwait following Operation Desert Storm.

From 1993 to 1998, Livingstone worked for the American Red Cross as Vice President of Health and Safety Services, as Acting Senior Vice President for Chapter Services, and as a consultant for Armed Forces Emergency Services. Prior to being nominated as the Under Secretary of the Navy, she had held the post of CEO of the Association of the United States Army (AUSA) and deputy chairman of its Council of Trustees. She also served as a vice president and a member of the Board of the Procurement Round Table, as well as a consultant on policy and management issues.

Livingstone served as Under Secretary of the Navy from July 26, 2001, to February 28, 2003. As the Under Secretary of the Navy, Livingstone was cited by General Counsel of the United States Navy, Alberto J. Mora for revoking Department of Defense regulations, authorized by Secretary of Defense Donald Rumsfeld, that allowed the use of coercive interrogation techniques on detainees at Guantanamo Bay Naval Base in Cuba. After the Naval Criminal Investigative Service (NCIS) Director David Brandt briefed Mora on alleged maltreatment of detainees at Guantanamo, Mora says he turned to Livingstone after his appeals to the Department of Defense General Counsel's office failed. In a memorandum to Navy investigators, Mora wrote of a January 3, 2003 meeting with Livingstone that "this was the first of almost daily conversations or meetings that I had with Under Secretary Livingstone on [detainee interrogation]. Her views and mine [in opposition to the treatment and policy] coincided, and she provided great support ..." On January 15, 2003, Rumsfeld suspended authority for the approved interrogation techniques.

== Later life ==
Since leaving the Navy, Livingstone has worked as a policy management consultant and has served as a member of the National Security Studies Board of Advisors, a board member of the Procurement Round Table and the NASA Return-to-Flight Task Group for safe return of Space Shuttle flights after the Columbia disaster.

Political offices
Preceded by Robert B. Pirie Jr.	United States Undersecretary of the Navy; 2001–2003	Succeeded by Dionel M. Aviles
Preceded by Gordon R. England	United States Secretary of the Navy; Acting; 2003	Succeeded by Hansford T. Johnson; Acting
