= Hansford T. Johnson =

United States Air Force general

Hansford Tillman Johnson
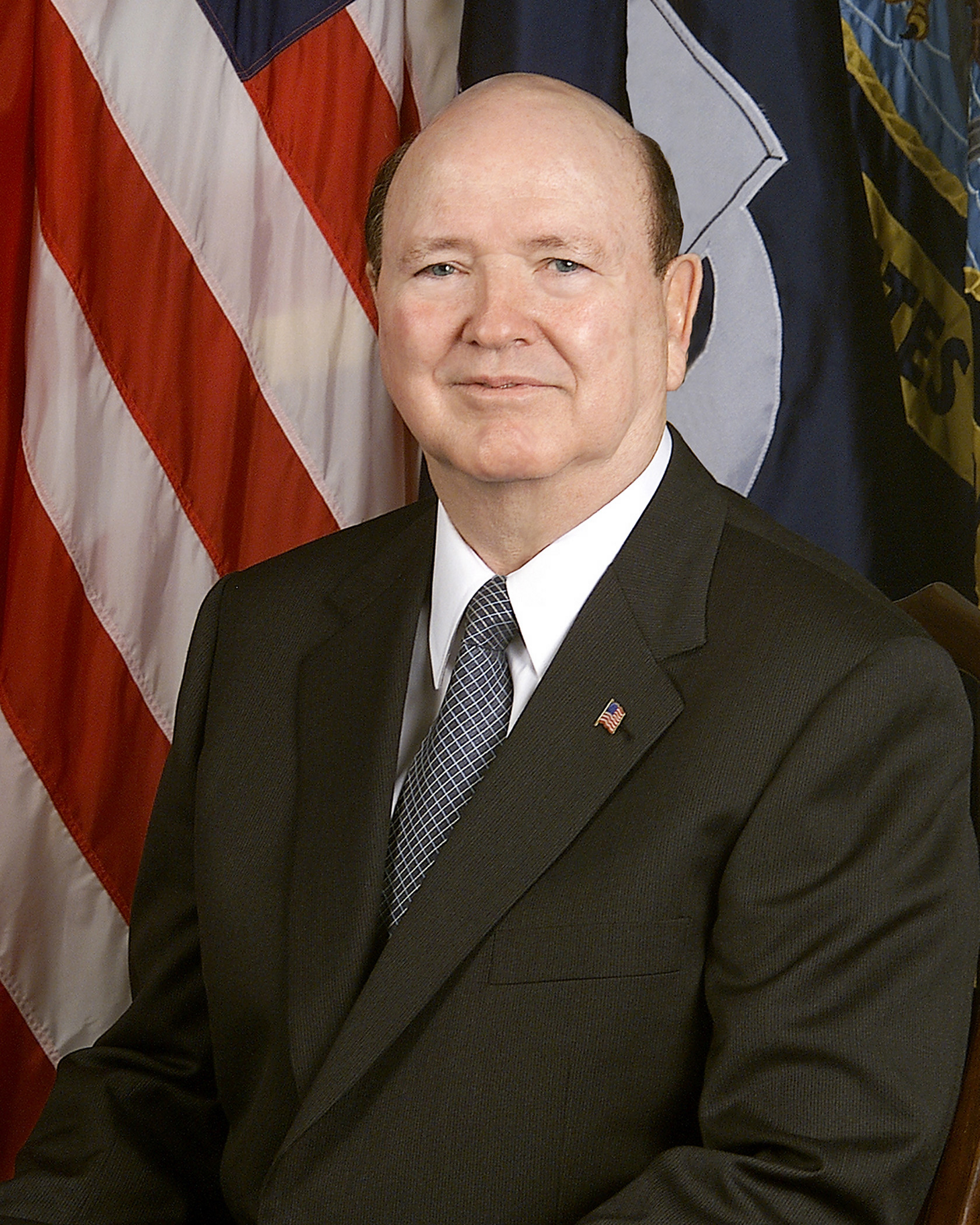

United States Secretary of the Navy
- Acting
- In office February 7, 2003 – September 30, 2003
- President: George W. Bush
- Preceded by: Susan Livingstone
- Succeeded by: Gordon R. England

3rd United States Assistant Secretary of the Navy for Installations and Environment
- In office August 7, 2001 – March 1, 2005
- President: George W. Bush
- Preceded by: Duncan Holaday (acting)
- Succeeded by: B. J. Penn

Personal details
- Born: January 3, 1936 (age 90) Aiken, South Carolina
- Education: United States Air Force Academy (BS); Stanford University (MS); University of Colorado (MBA)

Military service
- Allegiance: United States
- Branch/service: United States Air Force
- Years of service: 1959–1992
- Rank: General
- Commands: Air Mobility Command; United States Transportation Command; 22nd Bombardment Wing
- Battles/wars: Vietnam War; Gulf War
- Awards: Defense Distinguished Service Medal (2); Air Force Distinguished Service Medal; Silver Star; Legion of Merit (3); Distinguished Flying Cross (3)

Hansford Tillman (HT) Johnson (born January 3, 1936) is a retired four-star general in the United States Air Force who served as the Acting United States Secretary of the Navy, overseeing the United States Navy and United States Marine Corps in the administration of President George W. Bush. He is the only retired Air Force officer to ever hold that position. Prior to that he was Assistant Secretary of the Navy (Installation and Environment). He currently works at the Institute for Defense Analyses.

== Early life and Air Force career ==
Johnson was born on January 3, 1936, in Aiken, South Carolina. He graduated from high school in 1953 and then attended Clemson College. He was the outstanding graduate in thermodynamics and aerodynamics from the United States Air Force Academy in 1959, received a master's degree in aeronautics from Stanford University in 1967 and a master's degree in business from the University of Colorado in 1970. Johnson also graduated from the Air Force Squadron Officer School, Army Command and General Staff College, National War College, and the advanced management program at Dartmouth College. Johnson was the first graduate of the United States Air Force Academy to achieve the rank of general.

After graduation from the Air Force Academy, Johnson married Linda Whittle of Augusta, Georgia, and attended flight training at Bartow Air Base, Florida, and then Laredo Air Force Base, Texas, receiving his pilot wings in 1960. His first operational assignment was to the 317th Troop Carrier Wing, Evreux-Fauville Air Base, France, where he flew C-130 Hercules transports throughout Europe, Africa, the Middle East and West Asia. He continued flying with the 317th when it transferred to Lockbourne Air Force Base, Ohio.

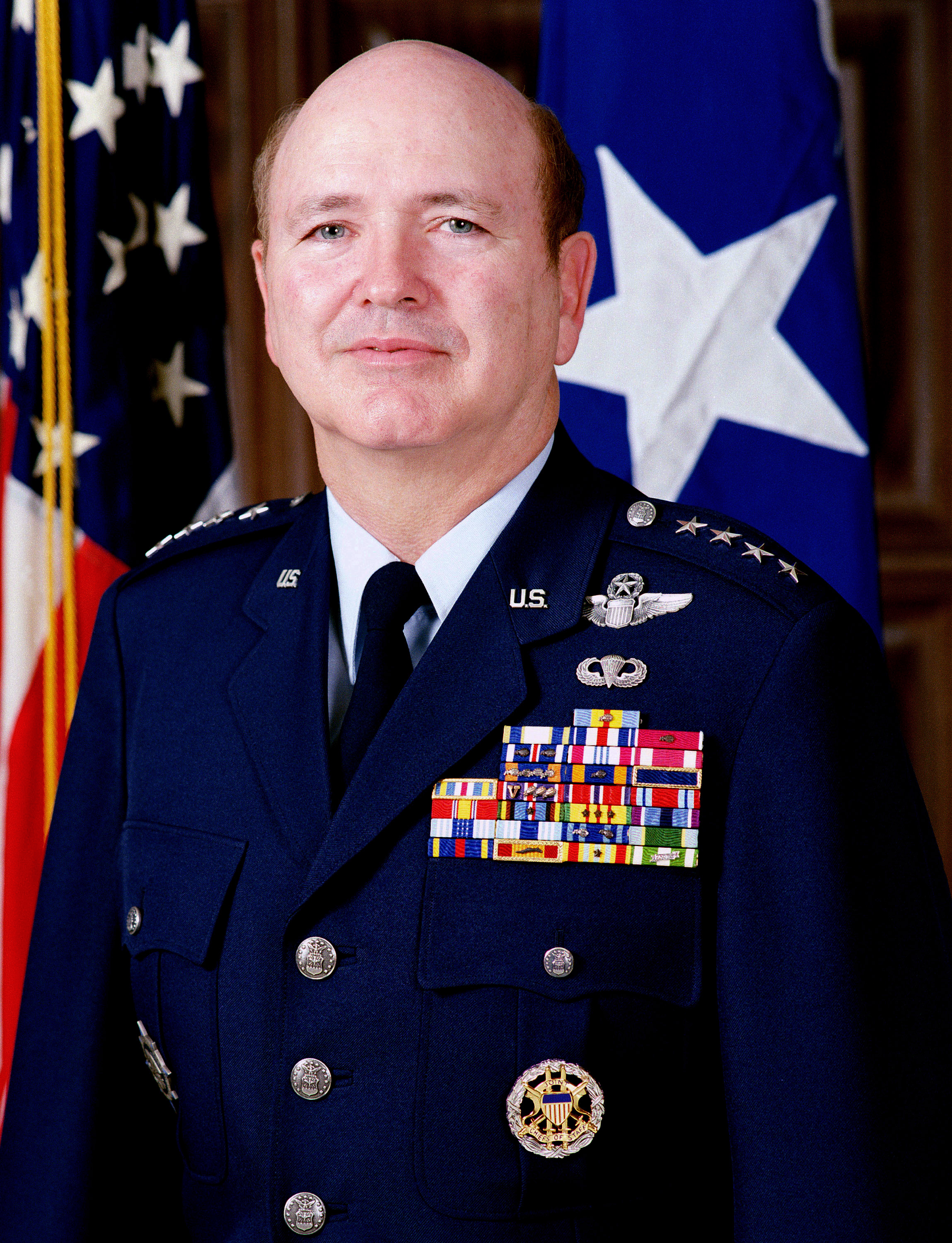
General Hansford Johnson, 1990

After completing graduate school at Stanford University, Johnson volunteered for duty in Vietnam. In 1967 he flew with the 20th Tactical Air Support Squadron as a forward air controller, and directed tactical close air support strike missions against enemy supply, storage, vehicle and troop targets. During his tour, he flew 423 combat missions, 71 of which were over North Vietnam or the demilitarized zone. After returning from Vietnam, he served as an assistant professor of aeronautics at the United States Air Force Academy, and then served as commander of the 22d Bombardment Wing at March Air Force Base, California and on the staff of Strategic Air Command (SAC) at Offutt Air Force Base, Nebraska.

From 1982 to 1985, Johnson led the team that successfully rebalanced the Air Force programs in the $100 billion annual Air Force budget, then led Strategic Air Command operations in 1985, where he directed the refueling and strategic reconnaissance forces during the bombing of Libya. Following his tour in SAC, Johnson became the vice commander of the Pacific Air Forces. In 1987, he became the deputy commander in chief of United States Central Command (USCENTCOM) at MacDill Air Force Base, Florida during Operation Earnest Will, the United States reflagging of Kuwaiti oil tankers and escort operations in the Persian Gulf. Following his tour at USCENTCOM, Johnson served the Chairman of the Joint Chiefs of Staff as Director of the Joint Staff.

Johnson ended his military career as the dual-hatted Commander of United States Transportation Command, the final commander of the Military Airlift Command and the first commander of the Air Mobility Command. Military forces under his command provided all airlift and special operations forces for Operation Just Cause, Operation Desert Shield and Operation Desert Storm, the movement of troops, equipment, and supplies to and from the Persian Gulf being the most concentrated movement in American military history. Johnson retired from active duty on August 31, 1992.

== Awards and decorations ==
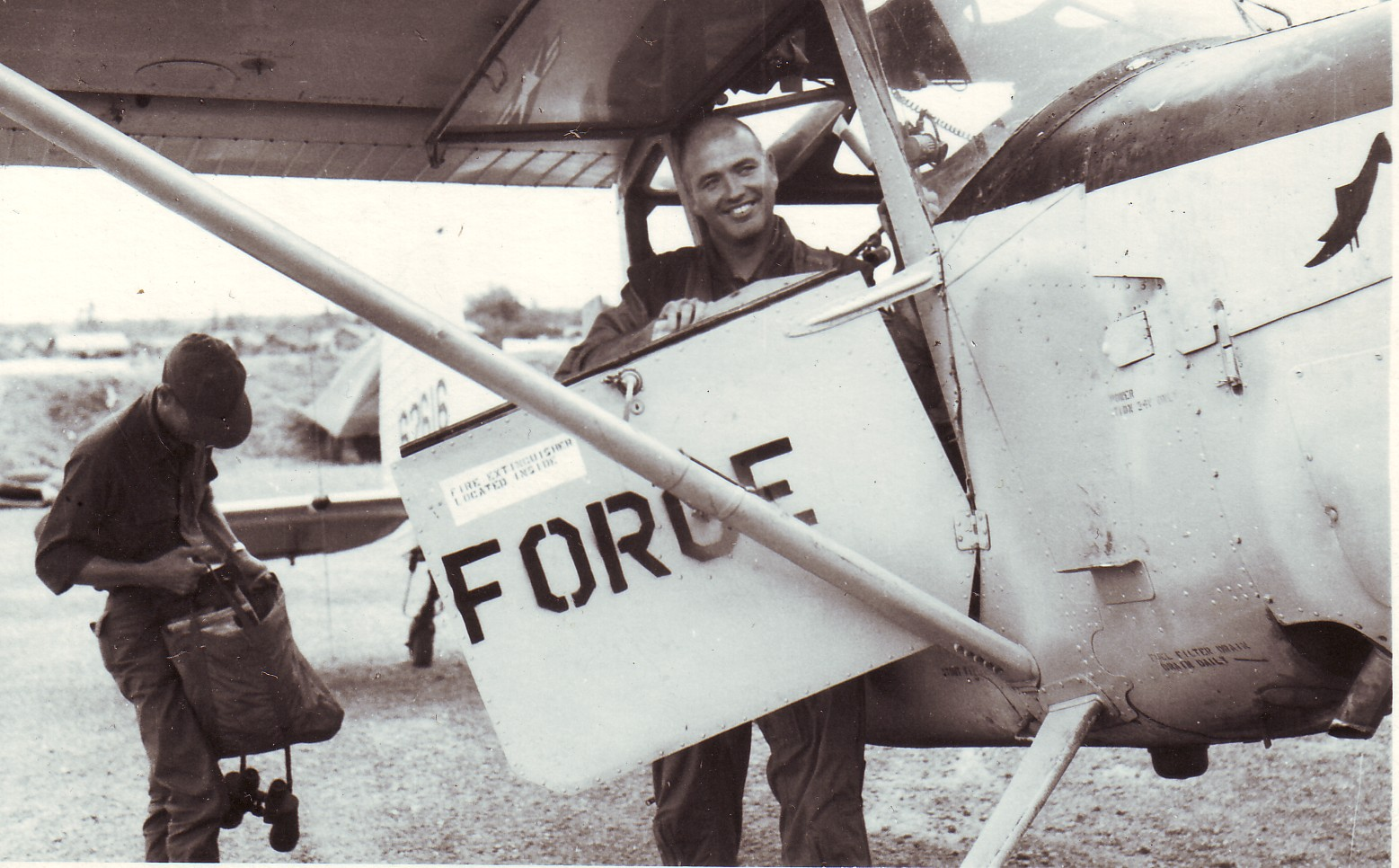
Capt. H. T. Johnson back from a mission, La Vang airfield, Quảng Trị Province, Republic of Vietnam, August 1967.

Johnson is a USAF Command Pilot with more than 7,800 flying hours, more than 1,000 of which were flown under combat conditions. He is also a qualified navigator and parachutist.

US Air Force Command Pilot Badge
US Air Force Basic Navigator Badge
Basic Parachutist badge
Joint Chiefs of Staff Badge
United States Transportation Command Badge

Defense Distinguished Service Medal with one bronze oak leaf cluster
Air Force Distinguished Service Medal
Silver Star
Legion of Merit with two oak leaf clusters
Distinguished Flying Cross with two oak leaf clusters
Defense Meritorious Service Medal
Meritorious Service Medal
Air Medal
Air Medal (second ribbon to denote a total of 23 awards)
Air Force Presidential Unit Citation
Navy Presidential Unit Citation
Joint Meritorious Unit Award
Air Force Outstanding Unit Award with three oak leaf clusters and "V" device
Air Force Organizational Excellence Award
Combat Readiness Medal
National Defense Service Medal with one bronze service star
Armed Forces Expeditionary Medal with service star
Vietnam Service Medal with three service stars
Humanitarian Service Medal
Air Force Overseas Short Tour Service Ribbon
Air Force Overseas Long Tour Service Ribbon with oak leaf cluster
Air Force Longevity Service Award with one silver and two bronze oak leaf clusters
Small Arms Expert Marksmanship Ribbon
Air Force Training Ribbon
Vietnam Armed Forces Honor Medal, first class with service star
Vietnam Gallantry Cross Unit Citation
Vietnam Campaign Medal

== Later work ==
After retiring from the Air Force, Johnson continued to serve active and former military personnel as the vice chairman of USAA and chairman of the USAA Bank, Investment Management Company, Buying Service and Real Estate. While at USAA, Johnson was appointed by President George H. W. Bush and President Bill Clinton to the 1993 Base Realignment and Closure Commission (BRAC).

When Kelly Air Force Base was closed by the 1995 BRAC, Johnson was appointed by the City of San Antonio to serve as the chair of the Local Reuse Authority, which very successfully transformed a "closed" base into a vibrant industrial center. Subsequently, Johnson served as executive vice president and chief operating officer of the Credit Union National Association (CUNA) in Madison, Wisconsin. He also served as president and CEO of EG&G Technical Services and later of EG&G when purchased by The Carlyle Group.

On August 3, 2001, President George W. Bush nominated Johnson to serve as the Assistant Secretary of the Navy (Installations and Environment), and he was sworn in four days later. The President directed him to assume the duties as the Acting Secretary of the Navy on February 7, 2003, the only Air Force officer to ever hold that position.

After leaving the Department of the Navy, Johnson became a Senior Fellow at the Institute for Defenses Analyses (IDA).

== Family ==
Johnson was married to Linda until her death in January 2011. They have one son, Richard, a daughter, Beth, and six grandchildren.

Government offices
Preceded by Robert B. Pirie, Jr. Duncan Holaday (acting)	Assistant Secretary of the Navy (Installations and Environment); August 7, 2001 – 2005	Succeeded by B. J. Penn
Preceded by Susan Livingstone (acting)	United States Secretary of the Navy (acting); February 7, 2003 – September 30, 2003	Succeeded by Gordon R. England
