= Robert B. Pirie =

United States Navy Vice Admiral (1905–1990)

Robert Burns Pirie
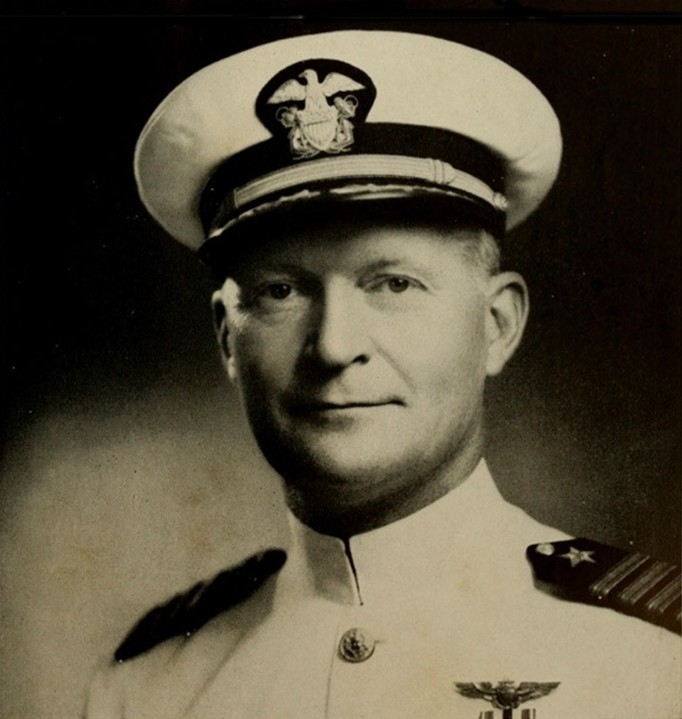
- Born: April 18, 1905; Wymore, Nebraska, US
- Died: January 9, 1990 (aged 84); Fort Belvoir, Virginia, US
- Relatives: Robert B. Pirie Jr.
- Military career
- Allegiance: United States of America
- Branch: United States Navy
- Service years: 1926–1962
- Rank: Vice admiral
- Commands: Sicily (CVE-118); Coral Sea (CV-43); U.S. Second Fleet; NATO Striking Fleet Atlantic
- Conflicts: World War II; Cold War
- Awards: Navy Distinguished Service Medal; Silver Star; Legion of Merit (2); Bronze Star Medal

Robert Burns Pirie (18 April 1905 – 9 January 1990) was a vice admiral in the United States Navy. He was Deputy Chief of Naval Operations for air when he retired in 1962.

== Biography ==
A native of Wymore, Nebraska, he was a 1926 graduate of the United States Naval Academy. He joined the Navy's air arm in 1928. In World War II he was executive officer of the carrier Mission Bay (CVE-59) in the Atlantic.

After the war he headed the aviation department at the Naval Academy and commanded two carriers, the Sicily (CVE-118) and the Coral Sea (CV-43), before assuming division and fleet commands. He was named Deputy Chief of Naval Operations in 1958, serving until his retirement.

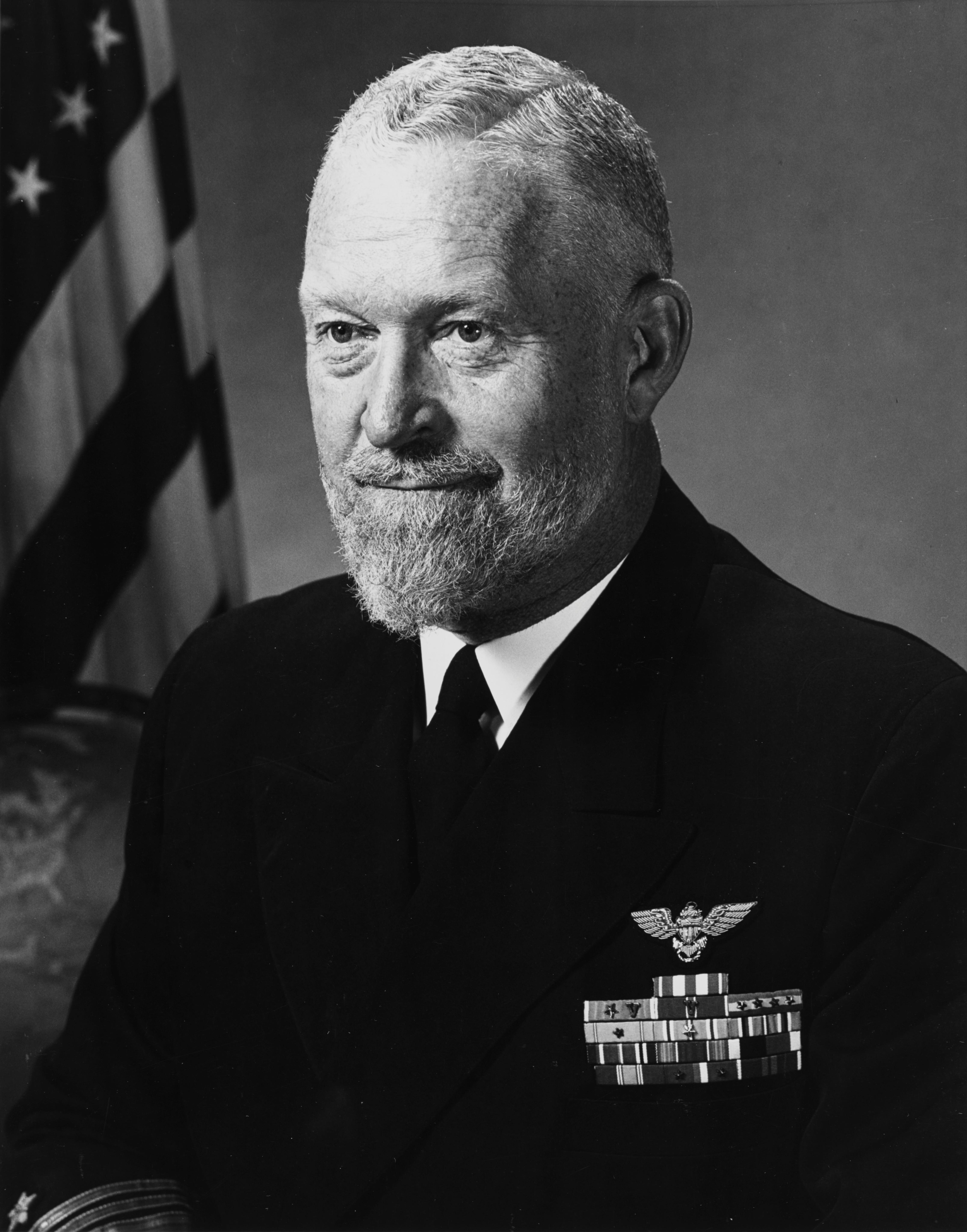
Vice Admiral Pirie in 1958

In the 1950s, he was allowed to wear facial hair, unusual then, reportedly because of a skin condition. It was a distinguished-looking Van Dyke beard.

While serving as Deputy Chief of Navy Operation (Air) 1958-1962 and was credited with maintaining the Navy’s air traffic controller program, following the enactment of the Federal Aviation Act of 1958. The Air Traffic Controller of the Year award, named in honor of Vice Adm. Robert B. Pirie, is presented for outstanding contributions to operational readiness and safety applied by individual Navy and Marine Corps Air Traffic Controller.

In 1958, Pirie also became an inaugural member, along with Hugh Dryden, Abe Silverstein and Ira Abbott, of the Civilian-Military Liaison Committee, which sought to coordinate the space-related activities of the Department of Defense with those of the newly created NASA. He helped to assemble the original January 1959 list of more than 500 test pilot volunteers which would quickly be whittled down to the April 1959 list of Mercury Seven astronauts.

Pirie retired from active duty in November 1962. After he left the Navy, he held management positions with the Aerojet General Corporation. He was a former president of the Naval Academy Foundation and the National Naval Aviation Museum in Pensacola, Florida. He was inducted into the Naval Aviation Hall of Honor in 1986.

After Pirie's death in 1990, he was interred at the United States Naval Academy Cemetery.

== Awards ==
Vice Admiral Robert Burns Pirie received a lot of high military decorations for valor or for distinguished service. His military awards included Navy Distinguished Service Medal, Silver Star, Legion of Merit with Gold Star or Bronze Star Medal. Here is his ribbon bar:

Naval Aviator Badge
1st Row	Navy Distinguished Service Medal		
2nd Row	Silver Star	Legion of Merit with Gold Star and "V" Device	Bronze Star Medal with "V" Device
3rd Row	Navy Presidential Unit Citation with four stars	American Defense Service Medal with Atlantic Clasp	Asiatic-Pacific Campaign Medal with one silver service star
4th Row	American Campaign Medal	European-African-Middle Eastern Campaign Medal	World War II Victory Medal
5th Row	Navy Occupation Service Medal	National Defense Service Medal with one service star	Philippine Liberation Medal with two bronze stars
