= Richard Danzig =

American politician and lawyer

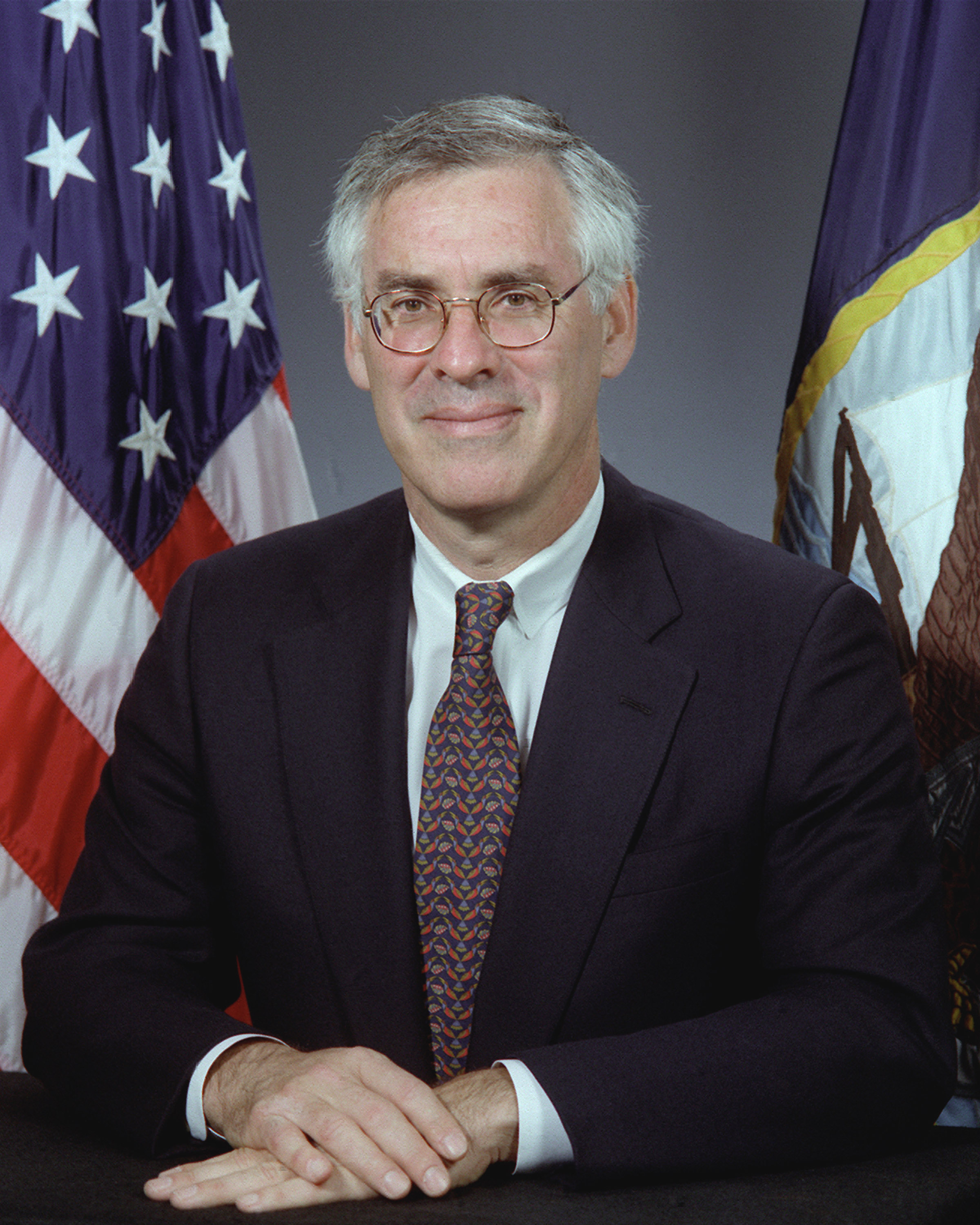

United States Secretary of the Navy
- In office November 16, 1998 – January 20, 2001
- President: Bill Clinton
- Preceded by: John Dalton
- Succeeded by: Robert Pirie (Acting)

Under Secretary of the Navy
- In office November 29, 1993 – May 30, 1997
- President: Bill Clinton
- Preceded by: Daniel Howard
- Succeeded by: Jerry Hultin

Personal details
- Born: September 8, 1944 (age 82) New York City, New York, U.S.
- Party: Democratic
- Spouse: Andrea Danzig
- Children: 2
- Education: Reed College (BA); Yale University (JD); Magdalen College, Oxford (BPhil, DPhil)

Richard Jeffrey Danzig (born September 8, 1944) is an American politician and lawyer who served as the 71st secretary of the Navy under President Bill Clinton. He served as an advisor of President Barack Obama during his presidential campaign and was later the chairman of the national security think-tank, the Center for a New American Security.

== Early life and education ==
Danzig was born in New York City in 1944, and attended the Bronx High School of Science, graduating in 1961. He received a B.A. degree in 1965 from Reed College, a J.D. degree in 1971 from Yale Law School, and a Bachelor of Philosophy degree in 1967 and a Doctor of Philosophy degree in 1968 from Magdalen College at Oxford University, where he was a Rhodes Scholar. Upon his graduation from law school, he served as a law clerk to United States Supreme Court Justice Byron White.

== Professorship ==
Between 1972 and 1977, Danzig taught contract law at Stanford and Harvard Universities. He was awarded a Prize Fellowship of the Harvard Society of Fellows, and a Rockefeller Foundation Fellowship. From 1977 to 1981, he served in the Office of the Secretary of Defense (OSD), first as a Deputy Assistant Secretary and then as the Principal Deputy Assistant Secretary of Defense for Manpower, Reserve Affairs and Logistics. In 1981, he was awarded the Defense Distinguished Public Service Award.

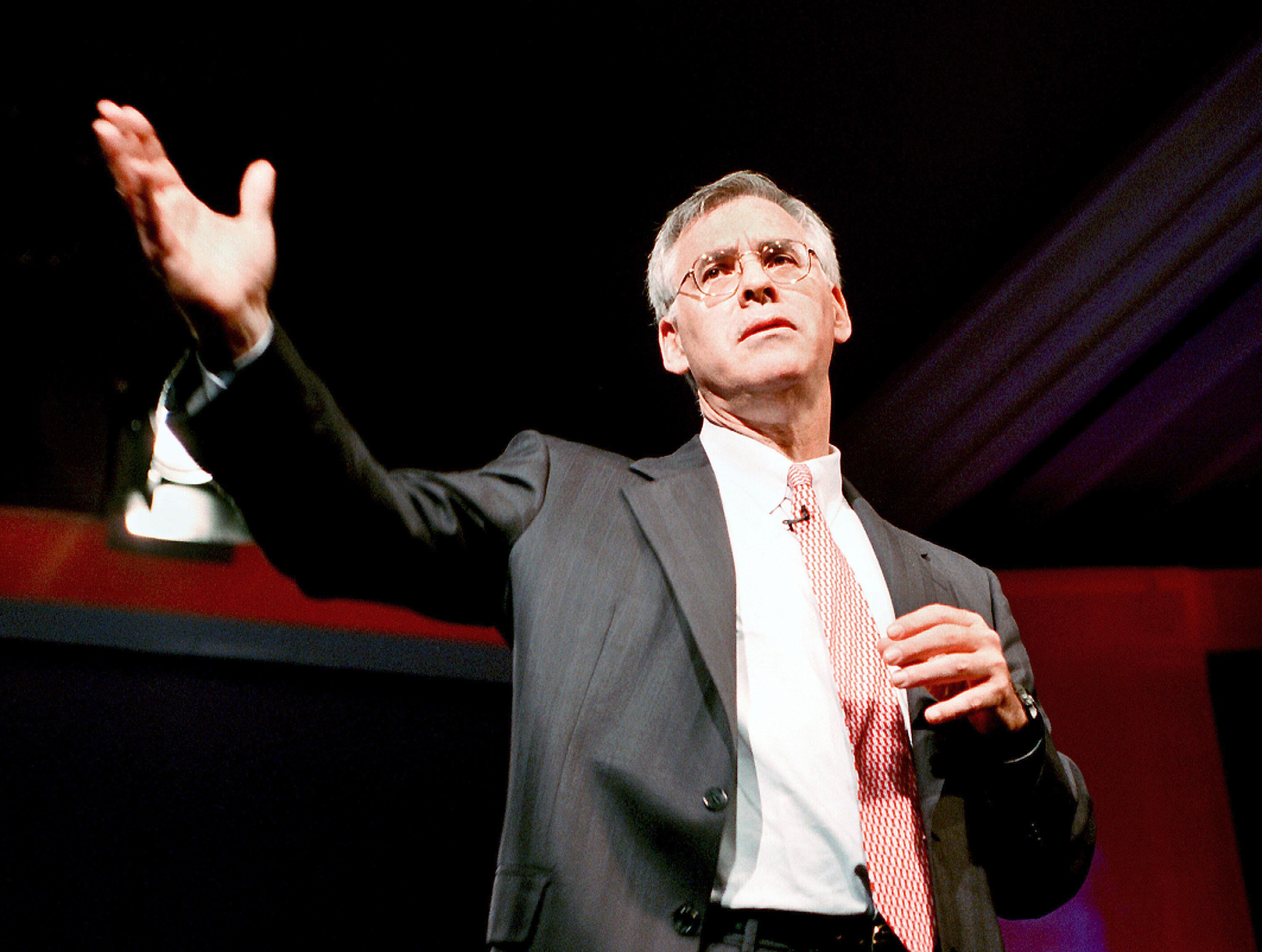
Danzig gives his keynote speech at the Red Herring annual innovation conference, in Carlsbad, California, on October 30, 2000.

== Washington, D.C. years ==
Between 1977 and 1981, Danzig served as a Deputy Assistant Secretary of Defense and then as Principal Deputy Assistant Secretary for Manpower, Reserve Affairs, and Logistics.

From 1981 to 1993, Danzig was a partner in the Washington, D.C., office of the international law firm Latham & Watkins. He served as deputy chair of the firm's International Practice Group, and also as director of its Japan Group. He was also a director of the National Semiconductor Corporation, a trustee of Reed College, and interim director of litigation and then vice chairman of the International Human Rights Law Group. During this time, Danzig was co-author, with the distinguished policy analyst Peter Szanton, of the book, National Service: What Would It Mean? A decade before, Szanton had been head of the New York City-RAND Institute, a joint venture of the City and the RAND Corporation when Danzig came to that office as a law student. The book which Danzig and Szanton co-authored helped shape America's current civilian National Service system.

Danzig served as the Under Secretary of the Navy from November 1993 to May 1997. In 1994, Danzig was elected as a fellow in the National Academy of Public Administration. Later he was sworn in as the 71st Secretary of the Navy on November 16, 1998. In the period between these two jobs, he and his wife, Andrea, lived in Asia and Europe while Danzig served as a Traveling Fellow of the Center for International Political Economy and as an adjunct professor at Syracuse University's Maxwell School of Citizenship and Public Affairs. He is currently a Senior Fellow at the Johns Hopkins Applied Physics Laboratory.

== Later career ==
In 2007 and 2008, Danzig worked for Senator Obama's campaign as an advisor on national security issues.

Danzig has been a director of National Semiconductor Corporation and Human Genome Sciences Corporation.

In 2014, Danzig delivered the fifth Sloan Foundation Cyber Security Lecture at the NYU Polytechnic School of Engineering, based on his publication "Surviving on a Diet of Poisoned Fruit: Reducing the National Security Risks of America's Cyber Dependencies".

He is currently chairman of the board of directors of the Center for a New American Security, an independent think tank. He is also a member of the Defense Policy Board, a federal advisory committee to the United States Department of Defense, and is a senior fellow at the Johns Hopkins Applied Physics Laboratory. Danzig also served as a member of the Homeland Security Advisory Council, but resigned on July 18, 2018, over immigration decisions to separate families.

== Awards and honors ==
- 1965: Rhodes Scholarship
- 1981: Defense Distinguished Public Service Award
- 2024: Namesake of USS Richard J. Danzig (DDG-143), Arleigh Burke-class destroyer

== Personal life ==
Danzig and his wife Andrea live in Washington, D.C., and have two adult children, David and Lisa.

== See also ==
- List of law clerks for the sixth seat of the Supreme Court of the United States

Political offices
Preceded by Daniel Howard	Under Secretary of the Navy; 1993–1997	Succeeded by Jerry Hultin
Preceded by John Dalton	Secretary of the Navy; 1998–2001	Succeeded by Robert Pirie; Acting
