= Late Roman army =

Roman army after 284

Late Roman Army
- Labarum of Constantine the Great
- Active: AD 284–480 (West) and to 640 ca. (East)
- Disbanded: The West Roman army disintegrated AD 425–470, whilst the East Roman army continued until the Muslim conquests, after which the theme system was created.
- Country: Roman Empire
- Branch: Army
- Size: Range: ca. 400,000–600,000
- Unit seniority and type: Scholae, Palatini, Comitatenses, Limitanei, Foederati
- Engagements: Satala (298), Strasbourg (357), Ctesiphon (363), Adrianople (378) and Catalaunian Plains (Chalons) (451)

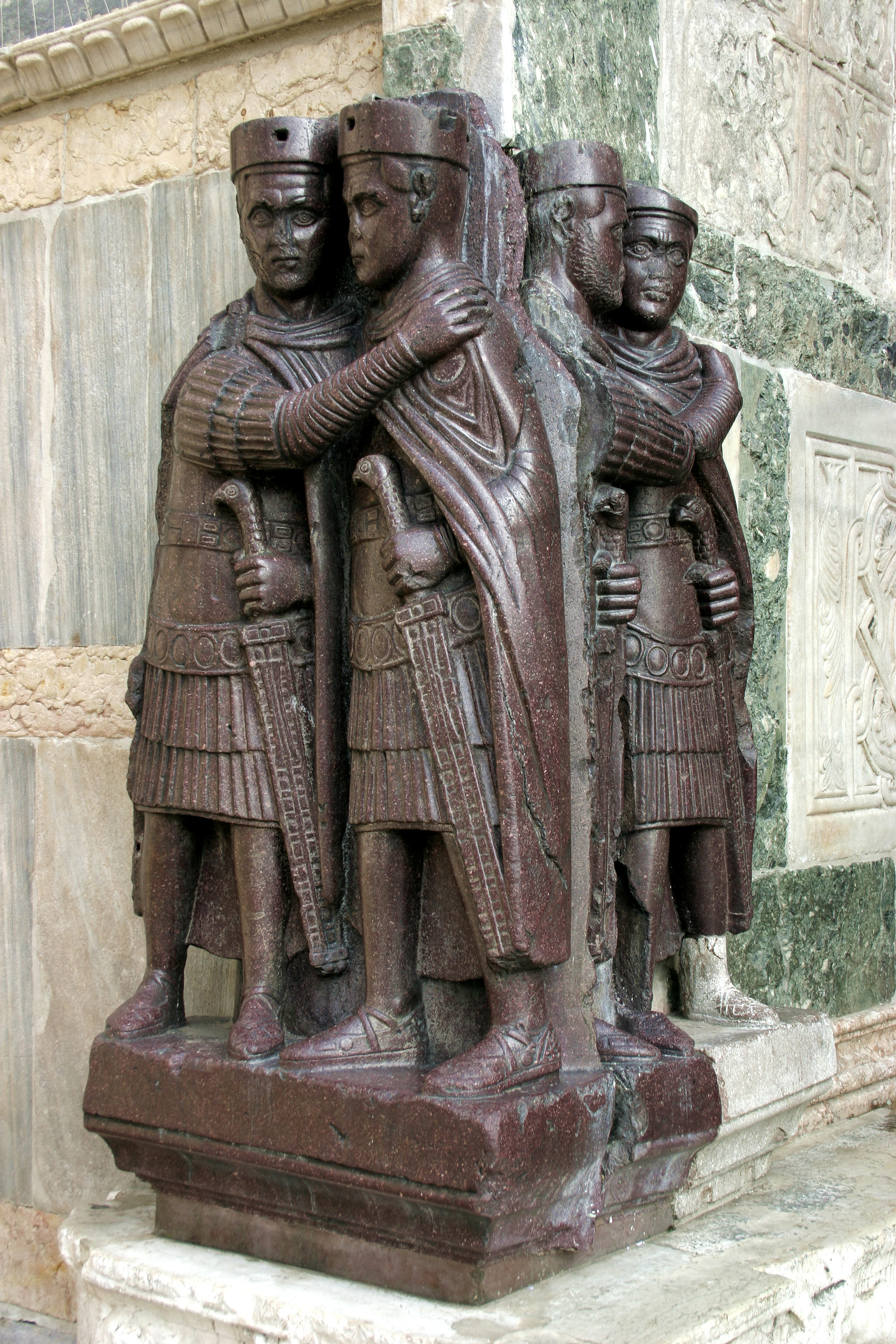
The Tetrarchs, a porphyry statue on Venice's Basilica di San Marco, shows the emperor Diocletian and his three imperial colleagues. To the left, Diocletian and Maximianus, the two Augusti (co-emperors); to the right, Galerius and Constantius Chlorus, the two Caesars (deputy emperors). Note the woollen "Pannonian" caps commonly worn (out of combat) by officers in the late army as a result of the pervasive influence of the Danubian officer class; and the sword grips with eagle-head pommels.

In modern scholarship, the "late" period of the Roman army begins with the accession of the Emperor Diocletian in AD 284, and ends in 480 with the death of Julius Nepos, being roughly coterminous with the Dominate. During the period 395–476, the army of the Roman Empire's western half progressively disintegrated, while its counterpart in the East, known as the East Roman army (or the early Byzantine army) remained largely intact in size and structure until the reign of Justinian I (r. AD 527–565).

The Imperial Roman army of the Principate (30 BC – 284 AD) underwent a significant transformation as a result of the chaotic 3rd century. Unlike the army of the Principate, the army of the 4th century was heavily dependent on conscription and its soldiers were paid much less than in the 2nd century. Barbarians from outside the empire probably supplied a much larger proportion of the late army's recruits than in the army of the 1st and 2nd centuries, but there is little evidence that this adversely affected the army's combat performance.

Scholarly estimates of the size of the 4th-century army diverge widely, ranging from ca. 400,000 to over one million effectives (i.e. from roughly the same size as the 2nd-century army to 2 or 3 times larger). This is due to fragmentary evidence, unlike the much better-documented 2nd-century army.

Under the Tetrarchy, military commands were separated from administrative governorships for the first time, in contrast to the Principate, where provincial governors were also commanders-in-chief of all military forces deployed in their provinces.

The main change in structure from the 2nd-century army was the establishment of large escort armies (comitatus praesentales), typically containing 20,000–30,000 top-grade palatini troops. These were normally based near the imperial capitals: (Constantinople in the East, Milan in the West), thus far from the empire's borders. These armies' primary function was to deter usurpers, and they usually campaigned under the personal command of their emperors. The legions were split into smaller units comparable in size to the auxiliary regiments of the Principate. Infantry adopted the more protective equipment of the Principate cavalry.

The role of cavalry in the late army does not appear to have been greatly enhanced as compared with the army of the Principate. The evidence is that cavalry was much the same proportion of overall army numbers as in the 2nd century and that its tactical role and prestige remained similar. However, the cavalry of the Late Roman army was endowed with greater numbers of specialised units, such as extra-heavy shock cavalry (cataphractii and clibanarii) and mounted archers. During the later 4th century, the cavalry acquired a reputation for incompetence and cowardice for their role in three major battles. In contrast, the infantry retained its traditional reputation for excellence.

The 3rd and 4th centuries saw the upgrading of many existing border forts to make them more defensible, as well as the construction of new forts with stronger defenses. The interpretation of this trend has fuelled an ongoing debate whether the army adopted a defence-in-depth strategy or continued the same posture of "forward defence" as in the early Principate. Many elements of the late army's defence posture were similar to those associated with forward defence, such as forward location of forts, frequent cross-border operations, and external buffer-zones of allied barbarian tribes. Whatever the defence strategy, it was apparently less successful in preventing barbarian incursions than in the 1st and 2nd centuries. This may have been due to heavier barbarian pressure, or to the practice of keeping large armies of the best troops in the interior, depriving the border forces of sufficient support.

== Sources ==
Much of our evidence for 4th century army unit deployments is contained in a single document, the Notitia Dignitatum, compiled c. 395–420, a manual of all late Roman public offices, military and civil. The main deficiency with the Notitia is that it lacks any personnel figures, so as to render estimates of army size impossible. Also, it was compiled at the very end of the 4th century; it is thus difficult to reconstruct the position earlier. However, the Notitia remains the central source on the late Army's structure due to the dearth of other evidence. The Notitia also suffers from significant lacunae and numerous errors accumulated from centuries of copying.

The main literary sources for the 4th-century army are the Res Gestae (History) of Ammianus Marcellinus, whose surviving books cover the period 353 to 378. Marcellinus, himself a veteran soldier, is regarded by scholars as a reliable and valuable source, but he largely fails to remedy the deficiencies of the Notitia as regards army and unit strength or units in existence, as he is rarely specific about either. The third major source for the late army is the corpus of imperial decrees published in the East Roman empire in the 5th and 6th centuries: the Theodosian code (438) and the Corpus Juris Civilis (528–39). These compilations of Roman laws dating from the 4th century contain numerous imperial decrees relating to all aspects of the regulation and administration of the late army.

De re militari is a treatise on Roman military affairs by Vegetius, a late 4th or early 5th-century writer, and contains considerable information on the late army, although its focus is on the army of the Republic and Principate. However, Vegetius (who wholly lacked military experience) is often unreliable. For example, he stated that the army abandoned armour and helmets in the later 4th century (offering the absurd explanation that this equipment was too heavy), which is contradicted by sculptural and artistic evidence. In general, it is not safe to accept a statement from Vegetius unless it is corroborated by other evidence.

Scholars of the late army have to contend with a dramatic diminution of the epigraphic record in the 3rd and 4th centuries, compared with the 1st and 2nd centuries. Diplomas were no longer issued to retiring auxiliaries after 203 (most likely because almost all were already Roman citizens by then). In addition, there was a huge reduction in the number of tombstones, altars and other dedications by Roman servicemen. Official stamps of military units on building materials (e.g., tiles) are much rarer, but this trend should probably not be seen as indicating a decline in the army's administrative sophistication. Papyrus evidence from Egypt shows that military units continued to keep detailed written records in the 4th century (the vast bulk of which are lost due to organic decomposition). Most likely, the decline in inscriptions is due to changing fashion, in part influenced by the increase in barbarian recruits and the rise of Christianity. The dearth of inscriptions leaves major gaps in our understanding of the late army and renders many conclusions tentative.

The seminal modern study of the late army is contained in The Later Roman Empire, 284-602 (LRE) by the "high priest" of late Roman studies, A.H.M. Jones. Because of its wealth of detail and documentary references, this 1964 publication remains an essential tool for all scholars of the period. However, its primary weakness is its age, for a considerable amount of archaeological work and other relevant scholarship has transpired in the decades since its publication.

== Evolution of the 4th-century army ==
=== Background: the army of the Principate ===
The regular army of the Principate was established by the founder–emperor Augustus (ruled 30 BC – 14 AD) and survived until the end of the 3rd century. The regular army consisted of two distinct corps, both being made up of mainly volunteer professionals.

The elite legions were large infantry formations, varying between 25 and 33 in number, of c. 5,500 men each (all infantry save a small cavalry arm of 120) which admitted only Roman citizens. The auxilia consisted of around 400 much smaller units of c. 500 men each (a minority were up to 1,000 strong), which were divided into approximately 100 cavalry alae, 100 infantry cohortes and 200 mixed cavalry/infantry units or cohortes equitatae. Some auxilia regiments were designated sagittariorum, meaning that they specialised in archery. The auxilia thus contained almost all the Roman army's cavalry and archers, as well as (from the late 1st century onwards) approximately the same number of foot soldiers as the legions. The auxilia were mainly recruited from the peregrini: provincial subjects of the empire who did not hold Roman citizenship, but the auxilia also admitted Roman citizens and possibly barbari, the Roman term for peoples living outside the empire's borders. At this time both legions and auxilia were almost all based in frontier provinces. The only substantial military force at the immediate disposal of the emperor was the elite Praetorian Guard of c. 10,000 men which was based in Rome.

The senior officers of the army were, until the 3rd century, mainly from the Italian aristocracy. This was divided into two orders, the senatorial order (ordo senatorius), consisting of the c. 600 sitting members of the Roman Senate and their sons and grandsons, and the more numerous (several thousand-strong) equites or "knights".

Hereditary senators and equites combined military service with civilian posts, a career path known as the cursus honorum, typically starting with a period of junior administrative posts in Rome, followed by 5–10 years in the military and a final period of senior positions in either the provinces or Rome. This tiny, tightly-knit ruling oligarchy of under 10,000 men monopolised political, military and economic power in an empire of c. 80 million inhabitants and achieved a remarkable degree of political stability. During the first 200 years of its existence (30 BC – 180 AD), the empire suffered only one major episode of civil strife (the Civil War of 68–9). Otherwise, usurpation attempts by provincial governors were few and swiftly suppressed.

As regards the military, members of the senatorial order (senatorii) exclusively filled the following posts:

(a) legatus Augusti pro praetore (provincial governor of a border province, who was commander-in-chief of the military forces deployed there as well as heading the civil administration)
(b) legatus legionis (legion commander)
(c) tribunus militum laticlavius (legion deputy commander).

The equites provided:

(a) the governors (procuratores) of Egypt and of a few minor provinces
(b) the two praefecti praetorio (commanders of the Praetorian Guard)
(c) a legion's praefectus castrorum (3rd-in-command) and its remaining five tribuni militum (senior staff officers)
(d) the praefecti (commanders) of the auxiliary regiments.

By the late 1st century, a distinct equestrian group, non-Italian and military in character, became established. This was a result of the established custom whereby the emperor elevated the primuspilus (chief centurion) of each legion to equestrian rank on completion of his year in office. This resulted in some 30 career soldiers, mostly non-Italian and risen from the ranks, joining the aristocracy each year. Far less wealthy than their Italian counterparts, many such equites belonged to families that provided career soldiers for generations. Prominent among them were Romanised Illyrians, the descendants of the Illyrian-speaking tribes that inhabited the Roman provinces of Pannonia (W Hungary/Croatia/Slovenia), Dalmatia (Croatia/Bosnia) and Moesia Superior (Serbia), together with the neighbouring Thracians of Moesia Inferior (N Bulgaria) and Macedonia provinces. From the time of Domitian (r. 81–96), when over half the Roman army was deployed in the Danubian regions, the Illyrian and Thracian provinces became the most important recruiting ground of the auxilia and later the legions.

=== 3rd-century developments ===
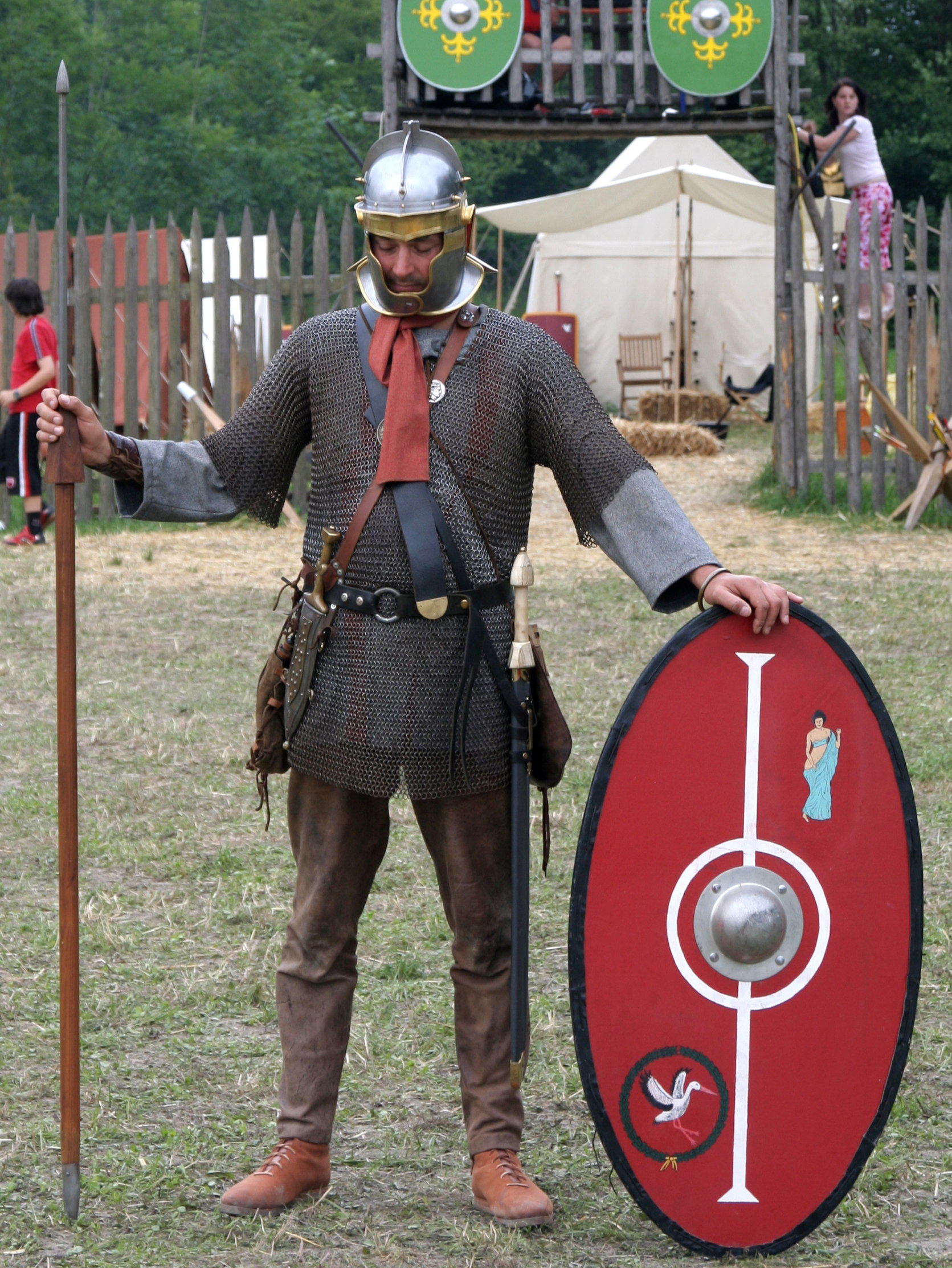
Reenactor wearing the typical equipment of a late 3rd-century foot soldier. The helmet is a Niederbieber type, with cross-pattern reinforcing ridges on the top of the bowl, and cheek-guards which can be fastened together. The sword is a spatha (median blade length 900 mm/36 inches), used by the cavalry only in the 1st and 2nd centuries. This soldier carries a spiculum, a heavy pilum-type javelin. Note the chain mail (lorica hamata) shirt and oval shield. Clothing consisted of a long-sleeved tunic, trousers and boots. The equipment of a 4th-century infantryman was very similar to the 3rd century, save that the spiculum was usually replaced by a heavy thrusting-spear (hasta) and the helmet was predominantly of the "Intercisa type".

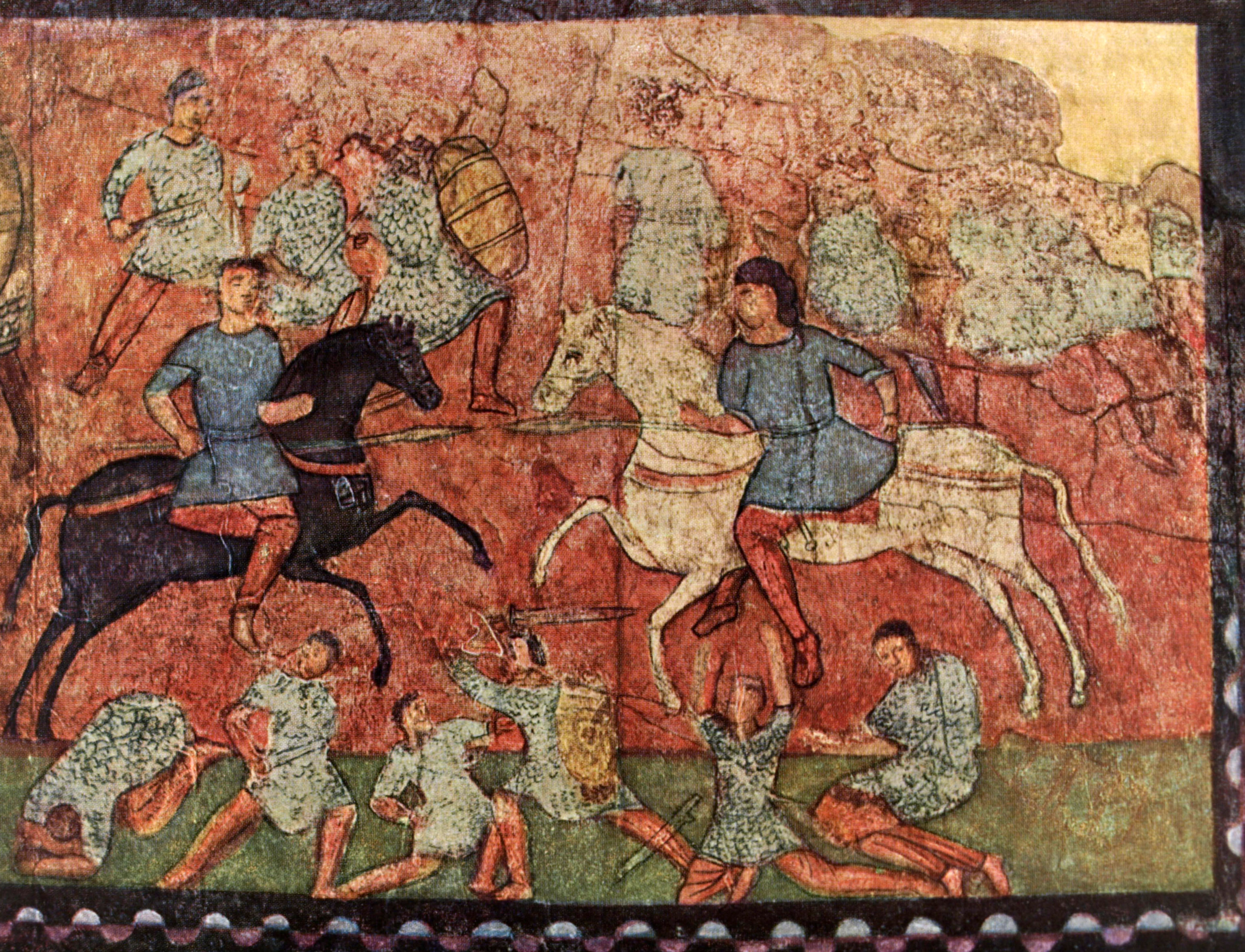
Fresco from the synagogue in the Roman fortified frontier city of Dura Europos dating to c. 250 AD. The centre shows unarmoured light cavalry charging with lances, the foreground and background show infantry fighting with spathae (long-bladed swords); they are equipped with knee-length scale armours, some with full-length sleeves.

The seminal development for the army in the early 3rd century was the Constitutio Antoniniana (Antonine Decree) of 212, issued by Emperor Caracalla (r. 211–217). This granted Roman citizenship to all free inhabitants of the empire, ending the second-class status of the peregrini. This had the effect of breaking down the distinction between the citizen legions and the auxiliary regiments. In the 1st and 2nd centuries, the legions were the symbol (and guarantors) of the dominance of the Italian "master nation" over its subject peoples. In the 3rd century, they were no longer socially superior to their auxiliary counterparts (although they may have retained their elite status in military terms) and the legions' special armour and equipment (e.g. the lorica segmentata) was phased out.

The traditional alternation between senior civilian and military posts fell into disuse in the 2nd and 3rd centuries, as the Italian hereditary aristocracy was progressively replaced in the senior echelons of the army by the primipilares (former chief centurions). In the 3rd century, only 10% of auxiliary prefects whose origins are known were Italian equestrians, compared to the majority in the previous two centuries. At the same time, equestrians increasingly replaced the senatorial order in the top commands. Septimius Severus (r. 193–211) placed equestrian primipilares in command of the three new legions he raised and Gallienus (r. 260–268) did the same for all the other legions, giving them the title praefectus pro legato ("prefect acting as legate"). The rise of the primipilares may have provided the army with more professional leadership, but it increased military rebellions by ambitious generals. The 3rd century saw numerous coup d'état and civil wars. Few 3rd-century emperors enjoyed long reigns or died of natural causes.

Emperors responded to the increased insecurity with a steady build-up of the forces at their immediate disposal. These became known as the comitatus ("escort", from which derives the English word "committee"). To the Praetorian Guard's 10,000 men, Septimius Severus added the legion II Parthica. Based at Albano Laziale near Rome, it was the first legion to be stationed in Italy since Augustus. He doubled the size of the imperial escort cavalry, the equites singulares Augusti, to 2,000 by drawing select detachments from alae on the borders. His comitatus thus numbered some 17,000 men, equivalent to 31 infantry cohortes and 11 alae of cavalry. The trend for the emperor to gather round his person ever greater forces reached its peak in the 4th century under Constantine I the Great (r. 306–337) whose comitatus may have reached 100,000 men, perhaps a quarter of the army's total effective strength.

The rule of Gallienus saw the appointment of a senior officer, with the title of dux (plural form: duces, the origin of the medieval noble rank of duke), to command all the comitatus cavalry. This force included equites promoti (cavalry contingents detached from the legions), plus Illyrian light cavalry (equites Dalmatarum) and allied barbarian cavalry (equites foederati). Under Constantine I, the head of the comitatus cavalry was given the title of magister equitum ("master of horse"), which in Republican times had been held by the deputy to a Roman dictator. But neither title implies the existence of an independent "cavalry army", as was suggested by some more dated scholars. The cavalry under both officers were integral to mixed infantry and cavalry comitatus, with the infantry remaining the predominant element.

The 3rd century saw a progressive reduction in the size of the legions and even some auxiliary units. Legions were broken up into smaller units, as evidenced by the shrinkage and eventual abandonment of their traditional large bases, documented for example in Britain. In addition, from the 2nd century onwards, the separation of some detachments from their parent units became permanent in some cases, establishing new unit types, e.g. the vexillatio equitum Illyricorum based in Dacia in the early 2nd century and the equites promoti and numerus Hnaufridi in Britain. This led to the proliferation of unit types in the 4th century, generally of smaller size than those of the Principate. For example, in the 2nd century, a vexillatio (from vexillum = "standard") was any detachment from a legion or auxiliary regiment, either cavalry or infantry. In the 4th century, it denoted an elite cavalry regiment.

From the 3rd century are the first records of a small number of regular units bearing the names of barbarian tribes (as opposed to peregrini tribal names). These were foederati (allied troops under a military obligation to Rome) converted into regular units, a trend that was to accelerate in the 4th century. The ala I Sarmatarum, based in Britain, was probably composed of some of the 5,500 captured Sarmatian horsemen sent to garrison Hadrian's Wall by emperor Marcus Aurelius in c. 175. There is no evidence of irregular barbarian units becoming part of the regular army of the Principate until the 3rd century.

=== 3rd-century crisis ===
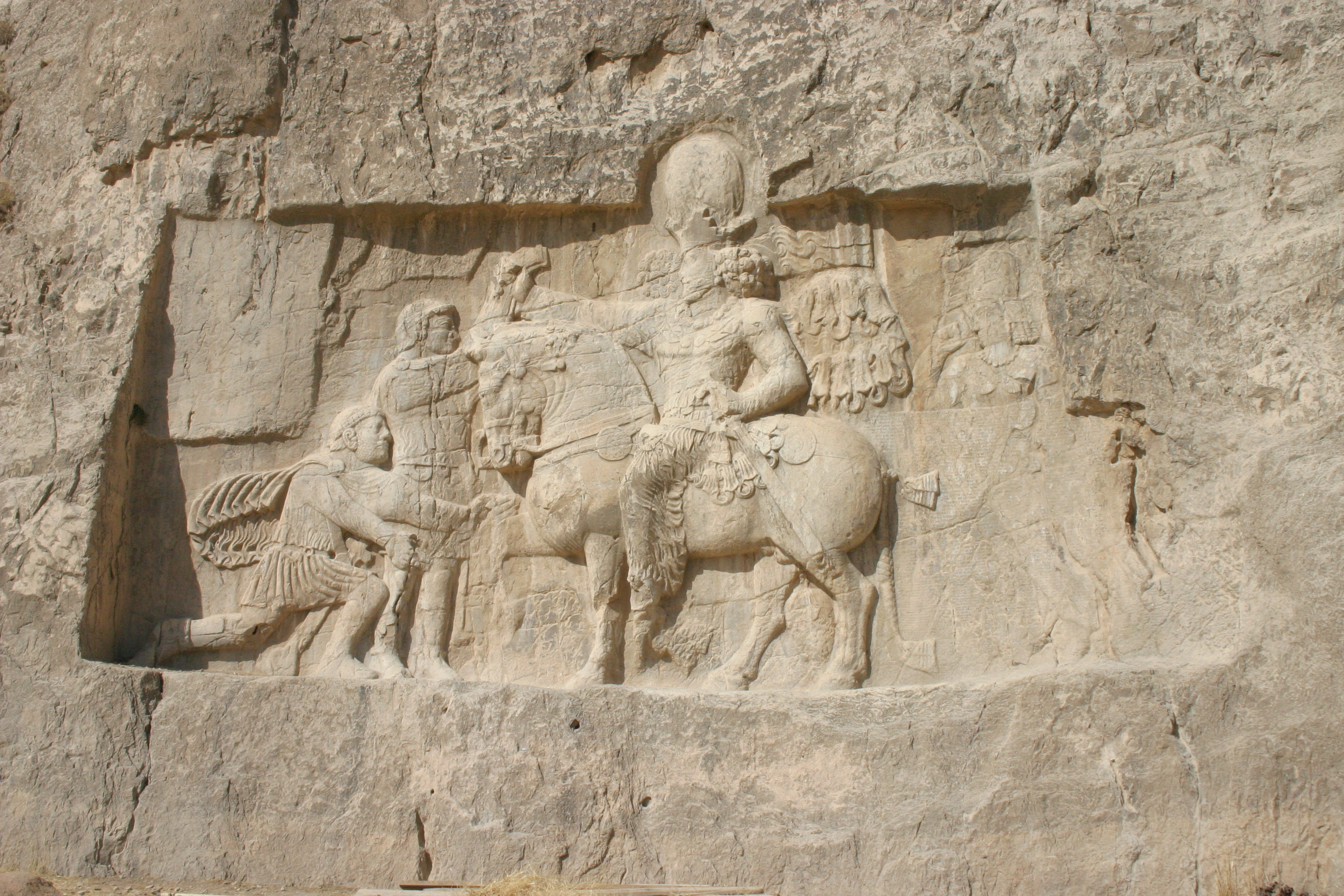
Roman emperor Valerian (left, kneeling) begs for his life after being captured by Persian Shah Shapur I (mounted) at the Battle of Edessa (260), the most humiliating of the military disasters suffered by the empire in the late 3rd century. Rock relief at Naqsh-e Rostam near Shiraz, Iran

The mid-3rd century saw the empire plunged into a military and economic crisis which almost resulted in its disintegration. It consisted of a series of military catastrophes in 251–271 when Gaul, the Alpine regions and Italy, the Balkans and the East were overrun by Alamanni, Sarmatians, Goths and Persians. At the same time, the Roman army was struggling with the effects of a devastating pandemic, now thought to have been smallpox, the Plague of Cyprian which began in 251 and was still raging in 270, when it claimed the life of Emperor Claudius II Gothicus (r. 268–270). The evidence for the earlier Antonine pandemic of the late 2nd century, probably also smallpox, indicates a mortality of 15–30% in the empire as a whole. Zosimus describes the Cyprianic outbreak as even worse. The armies and, by extension, the frontier provinces where they were based (and mainly recruited), would likely have suffered deaths at the top end of the range, due to their close concentration of individuals and frequent movements across the empire.

The 3rd-century crisis started a chain-reaction of socio-economic effects that proved decisive for the development of the late army. The combination of barbarian devastation and reduced tax-base due to plague bankrupted the imperial government, which resorted to issuing ever more debased coin e.g. the antoninianus, the silver coin used to pay the troops in this period, lost 95% of its silver content between its launch in 215 and its demise in the 260s. Thus, twenty times more money could be distributed with the same amount of precious metal. This led to rampant price inflation: for example, the price of wheat under Diocletian was 67 times the typical price under the Principate. The monetary economy collapsed and the army was obliged to rely on unpaid food levies to obtain supplies. Food levies were raised without regard to fairness, ruining the border provinces where the military was mainly based. Soldiers' salaries became worthless, which reduced the army's recruits to a subsistence-level existence. This in turn discouraged volunteers and forced the government to rely on conscription and large-scale recruitment of barbarians into the regular army because of the shortfalls caused by the plague. By the mid-4th century, barbarian-born men probably accounted for about a quarter of all recruits (and over a third in elite regiments), likely a far higher share than in the 1st and 2nd centuries.

=== Danubian military junta ===
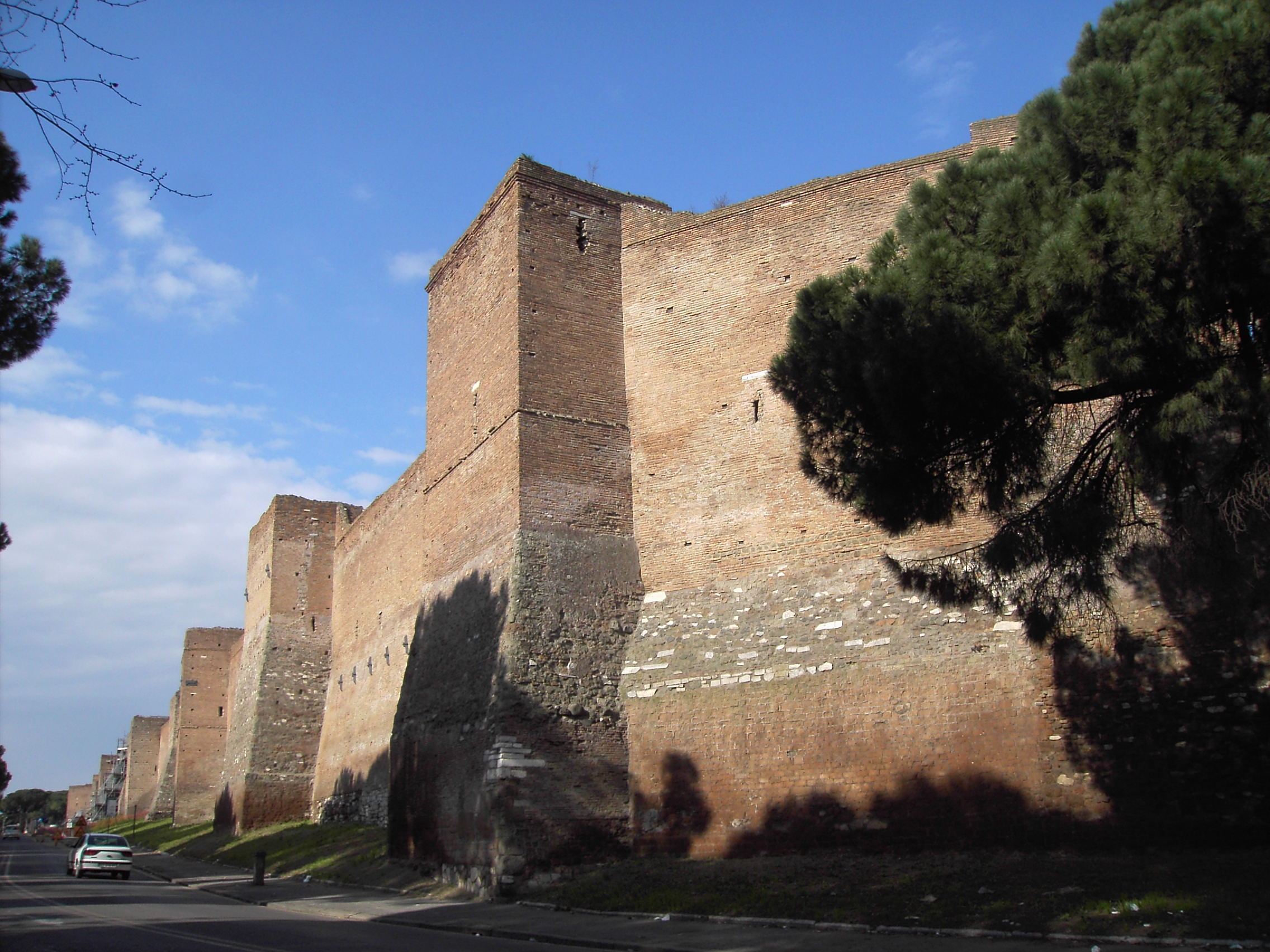
The Aurelian Walls of Rome, built by Aurelian in 270–5. Rome's first new wall since the construction of the Servian Wall after the Gauls sacked Rome 650 years earlier, they symbolised the pervasive insecurity of the 3rd-century empire. Original height: 8m (25 ft). Doubled in 410 to 16m (52 ft) after Gothic sack of Rome in 410. Both walls and towers were originally crenellated, but this has survived only in small sections. Most of the 19km circuit still stands today

By the 3rd century, Romanised Illyrians and Thracians, mostly primipilares and their descendants, came to dominate the army's senior officer echelons. Finally, the Danubian officer-class seized control of the state itself. In 268, the emperor Gallienus (ruled 260–68) was overthrown by a coup d'état organised by a clique of Danubian senior officers, including his successors Claudius II Gothicus and Aurelian (270–75). They and their successors Probus (276–82) and Diocletian (ruled 284–305) and his colleagues in the Tetrarchy formed a sort of self-perpetuating military junta of Danubian officers who were born in the same provinces (several in the same city, Sirmium, a major legionary base in Moesia Superior) and/or had served in the same regiments.

The Junta reversed the military disasters of 251–71 with a string of victories, most notably the defeat at Naissus of a vast Gothic army by Claudius II, which was so crushing that the Goths did not seriously threaten the empire again until a century later at Adrianople (378).

The Illyrian emperors or Danubian emperors were especially concerned with the depopulation of the border provinces due to plague and barbarian invasions during the Crisis. The problem was especially acute in their own Danubian home provinces, where much arable land had fallen out of cultivation through lack of manpower. The depopulation was thus a serious threat to army recruitment and supply. In response, the Danubian Junta pursued an aggressive policy of resettling defeated barbarian tribesmen on imperial territory on a massive scale. Aurelian moved a large number of Carpi to Pannonia in 272. (In addition, by 275 he evacuated the province of Dacia, removing the entire provincial population to Moesia, an act largely motivated by the same problem). His successor Probus is recorded as transferring 100,000 Bastarnae to Moesia in 279/80 and later equivalent numbers of Gepids, Goths and Sarmatians. Diocletian continued the policy, transferring in 297 huge numbers of Bastarnae, Sarmatians and Carpi (the entire latter tribe, according to Victor). Although the precise terms under which these people were settled in the empire are unknown (and may have varied), the common feature was the grant of land in return for an obligation of military service much heavier than the normal conscription quota. The policy had the triple benefit, from the Roman government's point of view, of weakening the hostile tribe, repopulating the plague-ravaged frontier provinces (and bringing their abandoned fields back into cultivation) and providing a pool of first-rate recruits for the army. But it could also be popular with the barbarian prisoners, who were often delighted by the prospect of a land grant within the empire. In the 4th century, such communities were known as laeti.

The Danubian emperors ruled the empire for over a century, until 379. Indeed, until 363, power was held by descendants of one of the original Junta members. Constantine I' s father, Constantius Chlorus, was a Caesar (deputy emperor) in Diocletian's Tetrarchy. Constantine's grandson Julian ruled until 363. These emperors restored the army to its former strength and effectiveness, but were solely concerned with the needs and interests of the military. They were also divorced from the wealthy Roman senatorial families that dominated the Senate and owned much of the empire's land. This in turn bred a feeling of alienation from the army among the Roman aristocracy which in the later 4th century began to resist the military's exorbitant demands for recruits and supplies.

=== Diocletian ===
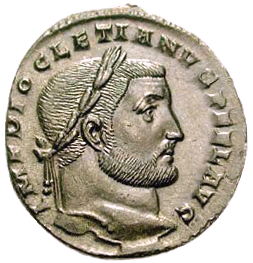
The emperor Diocletian (ruled 284–305), who launched wide-ranging reforms of the Roman army and government. Bronze follis coin

Diocletian made wide-ranging administrative, economic and military reforms that were aimed at providing the military with adequate manpower, supplies and military infrastructure. In the words of one historian, "Diocletian ... turned the entire empire into a regimented logistic base" (to supply the army).

==== Military command structure ====
Diocletian's administrative reforms had the twin aims of ensuring political stability and providing the bureaucratic infrastructure needed to raise the recruits and supplies needed by the army. At the top, Diocletian instituted the Tetrarchy. This divided the empire into two halves, East and West, each to be ruled by an Augustus (emperor). Each Augustus would in turn appoint a deputy called a Caesar, who would act both as his ruling partner (each Caesar was assigned a quarter of the empire) and designated successor. This four-man team would thus have the flexibility to deal with multiple and simultaneous challenges as well as providing for a legitimate succession. The latter failed in its central aim, to prevent the disastrous civil wars caused by the multiple usurpations of the 3rd century. Indeed, the situation may have been made worse, by providing each pretender with a substantial comitatus to enforce his claim. Diocletian himself lived (in retirement) to see his successors fight each other for power. But the division of the empire into Eastern and Western halves, recognising both geographical and cultural realities, proved enduring: it was mostly retained during the 4th century and became permanent after 395.

Diocletian reformed the provincial administration, establishing a three-tiered provincial hierarchy, in place of the previous single-tier structure. The original 42 provinces of the Principate were almost tripled in number to c. 120. These were grouped into 12 divisions called dioceses, each under a vicarius, in turn grouped into 4 praetorian prefectures, to correspond to the areas of command assigned to the four Tetrarchs, who were each assisted by a chief-of-staff called a praefectus praetorio (not be confused with the commanders of the Praetorian Guard, who held the same title). The aim of this fragmentation of provincial administration was probably to reduce the possibility of military rebellion by governors (by reducing the forces they each controlled).

Also to this end, and to provide more professional military leadership, Diocletian separated military from civil command at the lowest, provincial level. Governors of provinces on the frontiers were stripped of command of the troops stationed there in favour of purely military officers called duces limitis ("border commanders"). Some 20 duces may have been created under Diocletian. Most duces were given command of forces in a single province, but a few controlled more than one province e.g. the dux Pannoniae I et Norici. However, at higher echelons, military and administrative command remained united in the vicarii and praefecti praetorio. In addition, Diocletian completed the exclusion of the senatorial class, still dominated by the Italian aristocracy, from all senior military commands and from all top administrative posts except in Italy.

==== Manpower ====
To ensure the army received sufficient recruits, Diocletian appears to have instituted systematic annual conscription of Roman citizens for the first time since the days of the Roman Republic. In addition, he was probably responsible for the decree, first recorded in 313, compelling the sons of serving soldiers and veterans to enlist.

Under Diocletian, the number of legions, and probably of other units, more than doubled. But it is unlikely that overall army size increased nearly as much, since unit strengths appear to have been reduced, in some cases drastically e.g. new legions raised by Diocletian appear to have numbered just 1,000 men, compared to the establishment of c. 5,500 in the Principate i.e. the new legions may have increased overall legionary numbers by only c. 15%. Even so, scholars generally agree that Diocletian increased army numbers substantially, by at least 33%.

==== Supplies ====
Diocletian's primary concern was to place the provision of food supplies to the army on a rational and sustainable basis. To this end, the emperor put an end to the arbitrary exaction of food levies (indictiones) for the army, whose burden fell mainly on border provinces and which had ruined them economically. He instituted a system of regular annual indictiones ("tax levies") with the tax demanded set in advance for 5 years and related to the amount of cultivated land in each province, backed by a thorough empire-wide census of land, peasants and livestock. To deal with the problem of rural depopulation in some areas (and consequent loss of food production), he decreed that peasants, who had always been free to leave their land during the Principate, must never leave the locality in which they were registered by the census (legal term is 'origo'). This measure had the effect of legally tying tenant farmers (coloni) and their descendants to their landlords' estates.

==== Military infrastructure ====
In parallel with restoring the size of the army, Diocletian's efforts and resources were focused on a massive upgrading of the defensive infrastructure along all the empire's borders, including new forts and strategic military roads.

=== Constantine ===
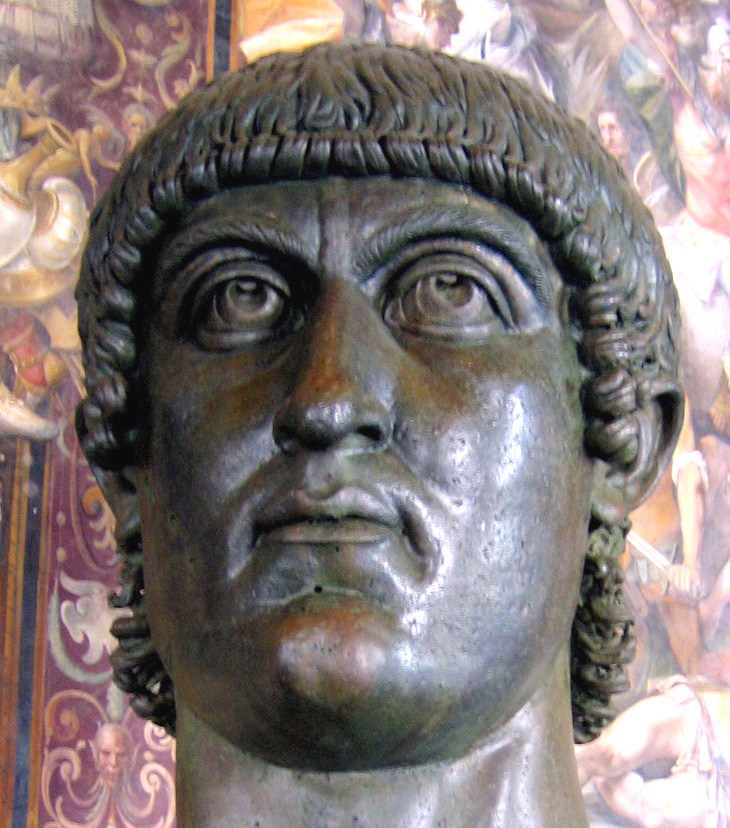
The emperor Constantine I (ruled 312–37), who established the first large-scale comitatus (imperial escort army) and divided the army into escort army (comitatenses) and border (limitanei) troops, giving the late Roman army the structure described in the Notitia Dignitatum. Bust in Musei Capitolini, Rome

After defeating Maxentius in 312, Constantine disbanded the Praetorian Guard, ending the latter's 300-year existence. Although the instant reason was the Guard's support for his rival Maxentius, a force based in Rome had also become obsolete since emperors now rarely resided there. The imperial escort role of the Guard's cavalry, the equites singulares Augusti, was now fulfilled by the scholae. These elite cavalry regiments existed by the time of Constantine and may have been founded by Diocletian.

Constantine expanded his comitatus into a major and permanent force. This was achieved by the addition of units withdrawn from the frontier provinces and by creating new units: more cavalry vexillationes and new-style infantry units called auxilia. The expanded comitatus was now placed under the command of two new officers, a magister peditum to command the infantry and magister equitum for cavalry. Comitatus troops were now formally denoted comitatenses to distinguish them from the frontier forces (limitanei). The size of the Constantinian comitatus is uncertain. But Constantine mobilised 98,000 troops for his war against Maxentius, according to Zosimus. It is likely that most of these were retained for his comitatus. This represented about a quarter of the total regular forces, if one accepts that the Constantinian army numbered around 400,000. The rationale for such a large comitatus has been debated among scholars. A traditional view sees the comitatus as a strategic reserve which could be deployed against major barbarian invasions that succeeded in penetrating deep into the empire or as the core of large expeditionary forces sent across the borders. But more recent scholarship has viewed its primary function as insurance against potential usurpers. (See Strategy of the Late Roman army below).

Constantine I completed the separation of military commands from the administrative structure. The vicarii and praefecti praetorio lost their field commands and became purely administrative officials. However, they retained a central role in military affairs, as they remained responsible for military recruitment, pay and, above all, supply. It is unclear whether the duces on the border now reported direct to the emperor, or to one of the two magistri of the comitatus.

In addition, Constantine appears to have reorganised the border forces along the Danube, replacing the old-style alae and cohortes with new units of cunei (cavalry) and auxilia (infantry) respectively. It is unclear how the new-style units differed from the old-style ones, but those stationed on the border (as opposed to those in the comitatus) may have been smaller, perhaps half the size. In sectors other than the Danube, old-style auxiliary regiments survived.

The 5th-century historian Zosimus strongly criticised the establishment of the large comitatus, accusing Constantine of wrecking his predecessor Diocletian's work of strengthening the border defences: "By the foresight of Diocletian, the frontiers of the Roman empire were everywhere studded with cities and forts and towers... and the whole army was stationed along them, so it was impossible for the barbarians to break through... But Constantine ruined this defensive system by withdrawing the majority of the troops from the frontiers and stationing them in cities which did not require protection." Zosimus' critique is probably excessive, both because the comitatus already existed in Diocletian's time and because some new regiments were raised by Constantine for his expanded comitatus, as well as incorporating existing units. Nevertheless, the majority of his comitatus was drawn from existing frontier units. This drawdown of large numbers of the best units inevitably increased the risk of successful large-scale barbarian breaches of the frontier defences.

=== Later 4th century ===
On Constantine's death in 337, his three sons Constantine II, Constans and Constantius II, divided the empire between them, ruling the West (Gaul, Britain and Spain), the Centre (Italy, Africa and the Balkans), and the East respectively. They also each received a share of their father's comitatus. By 353, when only Constantius survived, it appears that the 3 comitatus had become permanently based in these regions, one each in Gaul, Illyricum and the East. By the 360s, the border duces reported to their regional comitatus commander. However, in addition to the regional comitatus, Constantius retained a force that accompanied him everywhere, which was from then called a comitatus praesentalis (imperial escort army). The three regional armies became steadily more numerous until, by the time of the Notitia (c. 400), there were 6 in the West and 3 in the East. These corresponded to the border dioceses of, in the West: Britannia, Tres Galliae, Illyricum (West), Africa and Hispaniae; and in the East: Illyricum (East), Thraciae and Oriens, respectively. Thus, the regional comitatus commander had become the military counterpart of the diocesan administrative head, the vicarius, in control of all military forces in the diocese, including the duces. At this point, therefore, the parallel military/civil administrative structure may be summarised as follows:

PROVINCIAL ADMINISTRATIVE STRUCTURE IN LATE ROMAN EMPIRE (c. 395)
Level	Military commander	Civil administrator
Province	Dux limitis	Corrector
Diocese	Magister militum (East)/ Comes rei militaris (West)	Vicarius
Praetorian prefecture	Augustus/Caesar	Praefectus praetorio

The evolution of regional comitatus was a partial reversal of Constantine's policy and, in effect, a vindication of Zosimus' critique that the limitanei had been left with insufficient support.

Despite the proliferation of regional comitatus, the imperial escort armies remained in existence, and in the period of the Notitia (c. 400) three comitatus praesentales, each 20–30,000 strong, still contained a total of c. 75,000 men. If one accepts that the army at the time numbered about 350,000 men, the escort armies still contained 20–25% of the total effectives. Regiments which remained with the escort armies were, not later than 365, denoted palatini (lit. "of the palace", from palatium), a higher grade of comitatenses. Regiments were now classified in four grades, which denoted quality, prestige and pay. These were, in descending order, scholares, palatini, comitatenses and limitanei.

== Army size ==
Because of fairly detailed evidence, there is broad scholarly consensus among modern scholars regarding the size of the Roman Army in the 1st and 2nd centuries AD. However, this consensus breaks down regarding the size of the Army in the 4th century. Lack of evidence about unit-strengths has resulted in widely divergent estimates of the Late Army's strength, ranging from c. 400,000 (much the same as in the 2nd century) to well in excess of one million. However, mainstream scholarship is divided between a "low count" of c. 400,000 and a higher count of c. 600,000.

=== Larger Late Army ===
The traditional view of scholars is that the 4th-century army was much larger than the 2nd-century army, in the region of double the size. The late 6th-century writer Agathias, gives a global total of 645,000 effectives for the army "in the old days", presumed to mean at its peak under Constantine I. This figure probably includes fleets, leaving a total of c. 600,000 for the army alone. Figures in Zosimus for the armies of contending emperors (including Constantine's) in 312 add up to a similar total of 581,000 soldiers. A.H.M. Jones' Later Roman Empire (1964), which contains the fundamental study of the late Roman army, calculated a similar total of 600,000 (exc. fleets) by applying his own estimates of unit-strengths to the units listed in the Notitia Dignitatum.

However, Jones' figure of 600,000 is based on assumptions about limitanei unit strengths which may be too high. Jones calculated unit-strengths in Egypt under Diocletian using papyrus evidence of unit payrolls. But a rigorous reassessment of that evidence by R. Duncan-Jones concluded that Jones had overestimated unit sizes by 2–6 times. For example, Jones estimated legions on the frontiers at c. 3,000 men and other units at c. 500. But Duncan-Jones' revisions found frontier legions of around 500 men, an ala of just 160 and an equites unit of 80. Even allowing for the possibility that some of these units were detachments from larger units, it is likely that Diocletianic unit-strengths were far lower than earlier.

More recently, Treadgold (1995) has endorsed the "Large Late Army" position in a detailed examination of the Byzantine army's strength (1995). Treadgold argues that John Lydus' figure of 389,704 soldiers represents the army's strength in 285, while Zosimus' figures totalling 581,000 soldiers account for the army in 312. Treadgold estimates that the army's size was roughly constant during the period 235-285, followed by a rapid increase of over 50% between 285-305, and again remained roughly constant 305-395.

But Treadgold's analysis can be criticised on a number of grounds:

1. The conclusion that the army's size remained constant between 235 and 285 appears implausible, as this period saw the Third Century Crisis, during which the army's recruitment capacity was severely diminished by the impact of the Plague of Cyprian, numerous civil wars and devastating barbarian invasions.
2. The assumption that John of Lydus' figure of 390,000 for the Diocletian's army refers to the beginning of that emperor's reign is dubious as it would seem more natural for the chronicler to report the army's peak strength under that emperor.
3. Treadgold's claim that Diocletian increased the army's numbers by over 50% is considered implausible by Heather, who points out that even 33% would have required a Herculean effort.
4. Treadgold's estimates are based on figures for Constantine's army provided by Zosimus, who has been criticized by scholars as an unreliable chronicler, both in general and as regards figures in particular: e.g. he reports that 60,000 Alamanni were killed at the Battle of Strasbourg in 357, an absurd inflation of the 6,000 reported by the contemporary and reliable Ammianus Marcellinus.

=== Smaller Late Army ===
The traditional view of a much larger 4th century army has fallen out of favour with some historians in more recent times, as existing evidence has been reappraised and new evidence uncovered. The revisionist view is that the 4th-century army was, at its peak, roughly the same size as the 2nd-century one and considerably smaller in the late 4th century.

1. Agathias' and Zosimus' figures, if they have any validity at all, may represent the official, as opposed to actual, strength of the Constantinian army. In reality, the slim evidence is that late units were often severely under-strength, perhaps only about two-thirds of official. Thus Agathias' 600,000 on paper may have been no more than c. 400,000 in reality. The latter figure accords well with the other global figure from ancient sources, by the 6th-century writer John Lydus, of 389,704 (excluding fleets) for the army of Diocletian. Lydus' figure is accorded greater credibility than Agathias' by scholars because of its precision (implying that it was found in an official document) and the fact that it is ascribed to a specific time period.
2. Excavation evidence from all the imperial borders which suggests that late forts were designed to accommodate much smaller garrisons than their predecessors from the Principate. Where such sites can be identified with forts listed in the Notitia, the implication is that the resident units were also smaller. Examples include the Legio II Herculia, created by Diocletian, which occupied a fort just one-seventh the size of a typical Principate legionary base, implying a strength of c. 750 men. At Abusina on the Danube, the Cohors III Brittonum was housed in a fort only 10% the size of its old Trajanic fort, suggesting that it numbered only around 50 men. The evidence must be treated with caution as identification of archaeological sites with placenames in the Notitia is often tentative and again, the units in question may be detachments (the Notitia frequently shows the same unit in two or three different locations simultaneously). Nevertheless, the weight of the archaeological evidence favours small sizes for frontier units. Archaeological evidence suggests that the army in Britain in ca. 400 just one-third its size in 200 (17,500 effectives versus 55,000).

At the same time, more recent work has suggested that the regular army of the 2nd century was considerably larger than the c. 300,000 traditionally assumed. This is because the 2nd-century auxilia were not just equal in numbers to the legions as in the early 1st century, but some 50% larger. The army of the Principate probably reached a peak of nearly 450,000 (excluding fleets and foederati) at the end of the 2nd century. Furthermore, the evidence is that the actual strength of 2nd-century units was typically much closer to official (c. 85%) than 4th century units.

Estimates of the strength of the Army through the imperial period may be summarised as follows:

ROMAN ARMY NUMBERS 24–420
Army corps	Tiberius 24	Hadrian c. 130	S. Severus 211	Diocletian start rule 284	Diocletian end rule 305	Constantine I end rule 337	Notitia (East ca. 395; West ca. 420)
LEGIONS	125,000	155,000	182,000				
AUXILIA	125,000	218,000	250,000				
PRAETORIAN GUARD	~~5,000	~~8,000	~15,000				
Total Roman Army	255,000	381,000	447,000	Low count: 260,000? Treadgold: 389,704	Low count: 389,704; Treadgold: 581,000	Elton: 410,000; Treadgold: 581,000	Low count: 350,000? Treadgold: 514,500

NOTE: Regular land forces only: excludes irregular barbarian foederati units and Roman Navy effectives (40-50,000 during Principate)

== Army structure ==
The later 4th-century army contained three types of army group: (a) Imperial escort armies (comitatus praesentales). These were ordinarily based near the imperial capitals (Milan in the West, Constantinople in the East), but usually accompanied the emperors on campaign. (b) Diocesan field armies (comitatus). These were based in strategic regions, on or near the frontiers. (c) Border armies (exercitus limitanei).

Types (a) and (b) are both frequently defined as "mobile field armies". This is because, unlike the limitanei units, their operations were not confined to a single province. But their strategic role was quite different. The escort armies' primary role was probably to provide the emperor's ultimate insurance against usurpers: the very existence of such a powerful force would deter many potential rivals, and if it did not, the escort army alone was often sufficient to defeat them. Their secondary role was to accompany the emperor on major campaigns such as a foreign war or to repel a large barbarian invasion. The diocesan comitatus, on the other hand, had the task of supporting the border forces of their diocese in major operations.

=== High Command structure ===
==== East ====
High command structure of the East Roman army c. AD 395. Commands and army sizes based on data in the Notitia Dignitatum Orientis. Eastern magistri militum, in command of comitatus armies, reported direct to the emperor. Duces are shown reporting to their diocesan magister militum, as suggested by Jones and Elton. Locations given indicate usual winter quarters in this period.

High command structure of the West Roman army c. 410–425. Commands and army sizes based on data in the Notitia Dignitatum. Reporting relationship between duces and comites as in the East, with duces reporting to senior officer in their diocese (whereas the Notitia places them directly under the magister utriusque militiae). Locations given indicate usual winter quarters in this period.

The eastern section of the Notitia is dated to c. 395, at the death of Theodosius I. At this time, according to the Notitia, in the East there were 2 imperial escort armies (comitatus praesentales), each commanded by a magister militum praesentalis, the highest military rank, who reported direct to the emperor. These contained units of mainly palatini grade. In addition, there were 3 diocesan comitatus, in East Illyricum, Thraciae and Oriens dioceses, consisting mostly of comitatenses-grade troops. Each was commanded by a magister militum, who also reported direct to the emperor.

The 13 eastern border duces reported to the magister militum of their diocese: (East) Illyricum (2 duces), Thraciae (2), Pontica (1), Oriens (6) and Aegyptum (2).

The eastern structure as presented in the Notitia remained largely intact until the reign of Justinian I (525-65).

==== West ====
The western section was completed considerably later than its eastern counterpart, c. 425, after the West had been overrun by Germanic peoples. However, it appears that the western section was several times revised, in the period c. 400-25: e.g. the dispositions for Britain must date from before 410, as that is when it is believed Roman forces withdrew from Britain definitively. This reflects the confusion of the times. Army dispositions of armies and commands were constantly changing to reflect the needs of the moment. The scale of the chaos in this period is illustrated by Heather's analysis of units in the army of the West. Of 181 comitatus regiments listed for 425, only 84 existed before 395; and many regiments in the comitatus were simply upgraded limitanei units, implying the destruction or disbandment of around 76 comitatus regiments during the period 395-425. By 460, the western army had largely disintegrated.

In consequence, the West section of the Notitia does not accurately represent the western army structure as it stood in 395 (for which the eastern structure is probably a better guide).

The western structure differs substantially from the eastern. In the West, after 395, the emperor was no longer in direct command of his diocesan comitatus chiefs, who instead reported to a military generalissimo (the late Roman equivalent to a pre-industrial-era Japanese shōgun). This anomalous structure had arisen through the ascendancy of the half–Vandal military strongman Stilicho (395–408), who was appointed by Theodosius I as guardian of his infant son, Honorius, who succeeded him in the West. After Stilicho's death in 408, a succession of weak emperors ensured that this position continued, under Stilicho's successors (especially Aetius and Ricimer), until the dissolution of the Western empire in 476. The generalissimo was generally known as the magister utriusque militiae (abbreviation: MVM, literally "master of both services", i.e. of both cavalry and infantry). This officer was in direct command of the single but large western imperial escort army based near Milan.

Subordinate to the MVM were all the diocesan comitatus commanders in the West: Gaul, Britannia, Illyricum (West), Africa, Tingitania and Hispania. In contrast to their eastern counterparts, who all held magister militum rank, the commanders of the Western regional comitatus were all of the lower comes rei militaris ("military count") rank, save for the magister equitum per Gallias. This was presumably because all but the Gaul comitatus were smaller than the 20–30,000 typically commanded by a magister militum.

According to the Notitia, all but two of the 12 Western duces also reported directly to the MVM and not to their diocesan comes. However, this is out of line with the situation in the East and probably does not reflect the situation in 395.

==== Scholae ====
In both East and West, the scholae, the emperors' personal cavalry escort, lay outside the normal military chain of command. According to the Notitia, the tribuni (commanders) of the scholae reported to the magister officiorum, a senior civilian official. However, this was probably for administrative purposes only. On campaign, a tribunus scholae probably reported direct to the emperor himself.

=== Bases ===
The troops of the field armies and of the border armies had different arrangements for their accommodation. The troops of the field armies were often billeted on the civilian population, while the troops of the border armies had permanent bases.

Most border units were based in forts as were their predecessors, the legions and auxiliary units of the Principate; in many cases they were based in the same forts. Some of the larger limitanei units (legiones and vexillationes) were based in cities, probably in permanent barracks. Because units of limitanei operated in one area, had their own camps, and often recruited from the same area, they tended to maintain better relations with the locals than the comitatenses and palatini, who would often be transferred to other areas, and were often quartered in civilian homes.

The units of the field armies, including palatini, comitatenses, and sometimes pseudocomitatenses, were based in cities when not on campaign, and could be based in temporary camps when on campaign. But it seems that did not usually occupy purpose-built accommodation like the city-based limitanei. From the legal evidence, it seems they were normally compulsorily billeted in private houses (hospitalitas). This is because they often wintered in different provinces. The comitatus praesentales accompanied their respective emperors on campaign, while even the regional comitatus would change their winter quarters according to operational requirements. However, in the 5th century, emperors rarely campaigned in person, so the praesentales became more static in their winter bases. The Western comitatus praesentalis normally was based in and around Mediolanum (Milan) and the two Eastern comitatus in the vicinity of Constantinople.

=== Regiments ===
The changes to unit structure in the 4th century were reduction of unit sizes and increase in unit numbers, establishment of new unit types and establishment of a hierarchy of units more complex than the old one of legions and auxilia.

==== Unit sizes ====
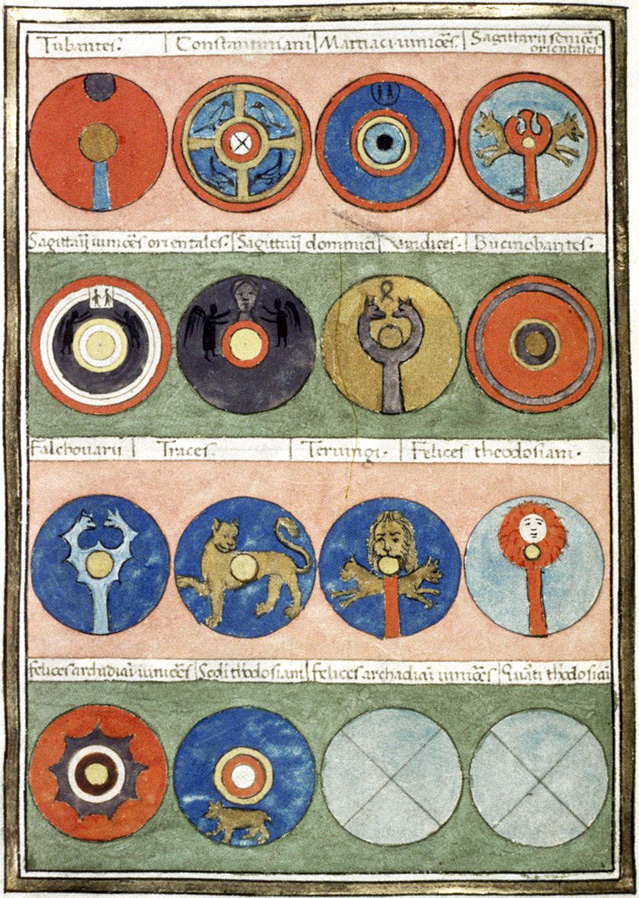
Shield insignia of regiments under the command of the Magister Militum Praesentalis II of the East Roman army c. 395. Page from the Notitia Dignitatum, a medieval copy of a Late Roman register of military commands

The evidence for the strength of late army units is very fragmented and equivocal. The table below gives some recent estimates of unit strength, by unit type and grade:

Size estimates for units in 4th-century army
Cavalry unit type	Comitatenses (inc. palatini)	Limitanei	XXXXX	Infantry unit type	Comitatenses (inc. palatini)	Limitanei
Ala		120–500		Auxilium	400–1,200	
Cuneus		200–300		Cohors		160–500
Equites		80–300		Legio	800–1,200	500–1,000
Schola*	500			Milites		200–300
Vexillatio**	400–600			Numerus		200–300

*Scholares were not technically comitatenses

** Vexillatio units could be named "Equites" e.g. Equites Stablesiani

Much uncertainty remains, especially regarding the size of limitanei regiments, as can be seen by the wide ranges of the size estimates. It is also possible, if not likely, that unit strengths changed over the course of the 4th century. For example, it appears that Valentinian I split about 150 comitatus units with his brother and co-emperor Valens. The resulting units may have been just half the strength of the parent units (unless a major recruitment drive was held to bring them all up to original strength).

Scholae are believed to have numbered c. 500 on the basis of a 6th-century reference.

In the comitatus, there is consensus that vexillationes were c. 500 and legiones c. 1,000 strong. The greatest uncertainty concerns the size of the crack auxilia palatina infantry regiments, originally formed by Constantine. The evidence is contradictory, suggesting that these units could have been either c. 500 or c. 1,000 strong, or somewhere in between. If the higher figure were true, then there would be little to distinguish auxilia from legiones, which is the strongest argument in favour of c. 500.

For the size of limitanei units, opinion is divided. Jones and Elton suggest from the scarce and ambiguous literary evidence that border legiones numbered c. 1,000 men and that the other units contained in the region of 500 men each. Others draw on papyrus and more recent archaeological evidence to argue that limitanei units probably averaged about half the Jones/Elton strength i.e. c. 500 for legiones and around 250 for other units.

==== Unit types ====
===== Scholae =====
Despite existing from the early 4th century, the only full list of scholae available is in the Notitia, which shows the position at the end of the 4th century/early 5th century. At that time, there were 12 scholae, of which 5 were assigned to the Western emperor and 7 to the Eastern. These regiments of imperial escort cavalry would have totalled c. 6,000 men, compared to 2,000 equites singulares Augusti in the late 2nd century. The great majority (10) of the scholae were "conventional" cavalry, armoured in a manner similar to the alae of the Principate, carrying the titles scutarii ("shield-men"), armaturae ("armour" or "harnesses") or gentiles ("natives"). These terms appear to have become purely honorific, although they may originally have denoted special equipment or ethnic composition (gentiles were barbarian tribesmen admitted to the empire on a condition of military service). Only two scholae, both in the East, were specialised units: a schola of clibanarii (cataphracts, or heavily armoured cavalry), and a unit of mounted archers (sagittarii). 40 select troops from the scholae, called candidati from their white uniforms, acted as the emperor's personal bodyguards.

===== Palatini and Comitatenses =====
In the field armies, cavalry units were known as vexillationes palatini and vex. comitatenses; infantry units as either legiones palatini, auxilia palatini, leg. comitatenses, and pseudocomitatenses. Auxilia were only graded as palatini, emphasising their elite status, while the legiones are graded either palatini or comitatenses.

The majority of Roman cavalry regiments in the comitatus (61%) remained of the traditional semi-armoured type, similar in equipment and tactical role to the alae of the Principate and suitable for mêlée combat. These regiments carry a variety of titles: comites, equites scutarii, equites stablesiani or equites promoti. Again, these titles are probably purely traditional, and do not indicate different unit types or functions. 24% of regiments were unarmoured light cavalry, denoted equites Dalmatae, equites Mauri or equites sagittarii (mounted archers), suitable for harassment and pursuit. Mauri light horse had served Rome as auxiliaries since the Second Punic War 500 years before. Equites Dalmatae, on the other hand, seem to have been regiments first raised in the 3rd century. 15% of comitatus cavalry regiments were heavily armoured cataphractarii or clibanarii, which were suitable for the shock charge (all but one such squadrons are listed as comitatus regiments by the Notitia)

Infantry units mostly fought in close order as did their forebears from the Principate. Infantry equipment was broadly similar to that of auxiliaries in the 2nd century, with some modifications (see Equipment, below).

===== Limitanei =====
In the limitanei, most types of unit were present. Infantry units include milites, numeri and auxilia as well as old-style legiones and cohortes. Cavalry units include equites, cunei and old-style alae.

The evidence is that units of the comitatenses were believed to be higher quality than of the limitanei. But the difference should not be exaggerated. Suggestions have been made that the limitanei were a part-time militia of local farmers, of poor combat capability. This view is rejected by many modern scholars. The evidence is that limitanei were full-time professionals. They were charged with combating the incessant small-scale barbarian raids that were the empire's enduring security problem. It is therefore likely that their combat readiness and experience were high. This was demonstrated at the siege of Amida (359) where the besieged frontier legions resisted the Persians with great skill and tenacity. Elton suggests that the lack of mention in the sources of barbarian incursions less than 400-strong implies that such were routinely dealt with by the border forces without the need of assistance from the comitatus. Limitanei regiments often joined the comitatus for specific campaigns, and were sometimes retained by the comitatus long-term with the title of pseudocomitatenses, implying adequate combat capability.

===== Specialists =====
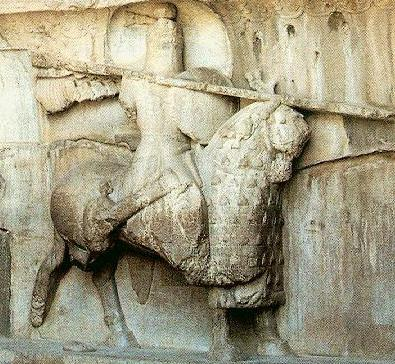
Bas-relief of a Sassanian heavily armoured mounted warrior. He is wearing what is probably a chain-mail face-guard. This is possibly the kind of armour denoted by the Roman term clibanarius, probably meaning "furnace man" in reference to the heat that would build up inside such all-encompassing armour. Note the armoured caparison for the horse. From Taq-e Bostan, Iran

External image
- Roman cataphract cavalryman

The late Roman army contained a significant number of heavily armoured cavalry called cataphractarii (from the Greek kataphraktos, meaning "covered all over"). They were covered from neck to foot by a combination of scale and/or lamellar armour for the torso and laminated defences for the limbs (see manica), and their horses were often armoured also. Cataphracts carried a long, heavy lance called a contus, c. 3.65 m (12 ft) long, that was held in both hands. Some also carried bows. The central tactic of cataphracts was the shock charge, which aimed to break the enemy line by concentrating overwhelming force on a defined section of it. A type of cataphract called a clibanarius also appears in the 4th-century record. This term may be derived from Greek klibanos (a bread oven) or from a Persian word. It is likely that clibanarius is simply an alternative term to cataphract, or it may have been a special type of cataphract. This type of cavalry had been developed by the Iranian horse-based nomadic tribes of the Eurasian steppes from the 6th century BC onwards: the Scythians and their kinsmen the Sarmatians. The type was adopted by the Parthians in the 1st century BC and later by the Romans, who needed it to counter Parthians in the East and the Sarmatians along the Danube. The first regiment of Roman cataphracts to appear in the archaeological record is the ala I Gallorum et Pannoniorum cataphractaria, attested in Pannonia in the early 2nd century. Although Roman cataphracts were not new, they were far more numerous in the late army, with most regiments stationed in the East. However, several of the regiments placed in the Eastern army had Gaulish names, indicating an ultimately Western origin.

Archer units are denoted in the Notitia by the term equites sagittarii (mounted archers) and sagittarii (foot archers, from sagitta = "arrow"). As in the Principate, it is likely that many non-sagittarii regiments also contained some archers. Mounted archers appear to have been exclusively in light cavalry units. Archer units, both foot and mounted, were present in the comitatus. In the border forces, only mounted archers are listed in the Notitia, which may indicate that many limitanei infantry regiments contained their own archers.

A distinctive feature of the late army is the appearance of independent units of artillery, which during the Principate appears to have been integral to the legions. Called ballistarii (from ballista = "catapult"), 7 such units are listed in the Notitia, all but one belonging to the comitatus. But a number are denoted pseudocomitatenses, implying that they originally belonged to the border forces. The purpose of independent artillery units was presumably to permit heavy concentration of firepower, especially useful for sieges. However, it is likely that many ordinary regiments continued to possess integral artillery, especially in the border forces.

The Notitia lists a few units of presumably light infantry with names denoting specialist function: superventores and praeventores ("interceptors") exculcatores ("trackers"), exploratores ("scouts"). At the same time, Ammianus describes light-armed troops with various terms: velites, leves armaturae, exculcatores, expediti. It is unclear from the context whether any of these were independent units, specialist sub-units, or indeed just detachments of ordinary troops specially armed for a particular operation. The Notitia evidence implies that, at least in some cases, Ammianus could be referring to independent units.

===== Bucellarii =====
Bucellarii (the Latin plural of bucellarius; literally "biscuit–eater", Greek: βουκελλάριοι) is a term for professional soldiers in the late Roman and Byzantine Empire, who were not supported directly by the state but rather by an individual, though they also took an oath of obedience to the reigning emperor. The employers of these "household troops" were usually prominent generals or high ranking civilian bureaucrats. Units of these troops were generally quite small, but, especially during the many civil wars, they could grow to number several thousand men. In effect, the bucellarii were small private armies equipped and paid by wealthy and influential people. As such they were quite often better trained and equipped, not to mention motivated, than the regular soldiers of the time. Originating in the late fourth century, they increased in importance until, in the early Byzantine army, they could form major elements of expeditionary armies. Notable employers of bucellarii included the magistri militiae Stilicho and Aetius, and the Praetorian Prefect Rufinus.

===== Foederati =====
Outside the regular army were substantial numbers of allied forces, generally known as foederati (from foedus = "treaty") or symmachi in the East. The latter were forces supplied either by barbarian chiefs under their treaty of alliance with Rome or dediticii. Such forces were employed by the Romans throughout imperial history e.g. the battle scenes from Trajan's Column in Rome show that foederati troops played an important part in the Dacian Wars (101–6).

In the 4th century, as during the Principate, these forces were organised into ill-defined units based on a single ethnic group called numeri ("troops", although numerus was also the name of a regular infantry unit). They served alongside the regular army for the duration of particular campaigns or for a specified period. Normally their service would be limited to the region where the tribe lived, but sometimes could be deployed elsewhere. They were commanded by their own leaders. It is unclear whether they used their own weapons and armour or the standard equipment of the Roman army. In the late army, the more useful and long-serving numeri appear to have been absorbed into the regular late army, rapidly becoming indistinguishable from other units.

== Recruitment ==
=== Romans ===
During the Principate, it appears that most recruits, both legionary and auxiliary, were volunteers (voluntarii). Compulsory conscription (dilectus) was never wholly abandoned, but was generally only used in emergencies or before major campaigns when large numbers of additional troops were required. In marked contrast, the late army relied mainly on compulsion for its recruitment of Roman citizens. Firstly, the sons of serving soldiers or veterans were required by law to enlist. Secondly, a regular annual levy was held based on the indictio (land tax assessment). Depending on the amount of land tax due on his estates, a landowner (or group of landowners) would be required to provide a commensurate number of recruits to the army. Naturally, landowners had a strong incentive to keep their best young men to work on their estates, sending the less fit or reliable for military service. There is also evidence that they tried to cheat the draft by offering the sons of soldiers (who were liable to serve anyway) and vagrants (vagi) to fulfil their quota.

However, conscription was not in practice universal. Firstly, a land-based levy meant recruits were exclusively the sons of peasants, as opposed to townspeople. Thus some 20% of the empire's population was excluded. In addition, as during the Principate, slaves were not admissible. Nor were freedmen and persons in certain occupations such as bakers and innkeepers. In addition, provincial officials and curiales (city council members) could not enlist. These rules were relaxed only in emergencies, as during the military crisis of 405–6 (Radagaisus' invasion of Italy and the great barbarian invasion of Gaul). Most importantly, the conscription requirement was often commuted into a cash levy, at a fixed rate per recruit due. This was done for certain provinces, in certain years, although the specific details are largely unknown. It appears from the very slim available evidence that conscription was not applied evenly across provinces but concentrated heavily in the army's traditional recruiting areas of Gaul (including the two Germaniae provinces along the Rhine) and the Danubian provinces, with other regions presumably often commuted. An analysis of the known origins of comitatenses in the period 350–476 shows that in the Western army, the Illyricum and Gaul dioceses together provided 52% of total recruits. Overall, the Danubian regions provided nearly half of the whole army's recruits, despite containing only three of the 12 dioceses. This picture is much in line with the 2nd-century position.

Prospective recruits had to undergo an examination. Recruits had to be 20–25 years of age, a range that was extended to 19–35 in the later 4th century. Recruits had to be physically fit and meet the traditional minimum height requirement of 6 Roman feet (5 ft 10in, 178 cm) until 367, when it was reduced to 5 Roman feet and 3 Roman palms (5 ft 7in, 170 cm). Vegetius hints that in the very late Empire (ca. AD 400) even this height requirement may have been relaxed, for "... if necessity demands, it is right to take account not so much of stature as of strength. Even Homer himself is not wanting as a witness, since he records that Tydeus was small in body but a strong warrior".

Once a recruit was accepted he was 'marked' on the arm, presumably a tattoo or brand, to facilitate recognition if he attempted to desert. The recruit was then issued with an identification disk (which was worn around the neck) and a certificate of enlistment (probatoria). He was then assigned to a unit. A law of 375 required those with superior fitness to be assigned to the comitatenses. In the 4th century, the minimum length of service was 20 years (24 years in some limitanei units). This compares with 25 years in both legions and auxilia during the Principate.

The widespread use of conscription, the compulsory recruitment of soldiers' sons, the relaxation of age and height requirements and the branding of recruits all add up to a picture of an army that had severe difficulties in finding, and retaining, sufficient recruits. Recruitment difficulties are confirmed in the legal code evidence: there are measures to deal with cases of self-mutilation to avoid military service (such as cutting off a thumb), including an extreme decree of 386 requiring such persons to be burnt alive. Desertion was clearly a serious problem, and was probably much worse than in the army of the Principate, since the latter was mainly a volunteer army. This is supported by the fact that the granting of leave of absence (commeatus) was more strictly regulated. While in the 2nd century, a soldier's leave was granted at the discretion of his regimental commander, in the 4th century, leave could only be granted by a far senior officer (dux, comes or magister militum). In addition, it appears that comitatus units were typically one-third understrength. The massive disparity between official and actual strength is powerful evidence of recruitment problems. Against this, Elton argues that the late army did not have serious recruitment problems, on the basis of the large numbers of exemptions from conscription that were granted.

=== Barbarians ===
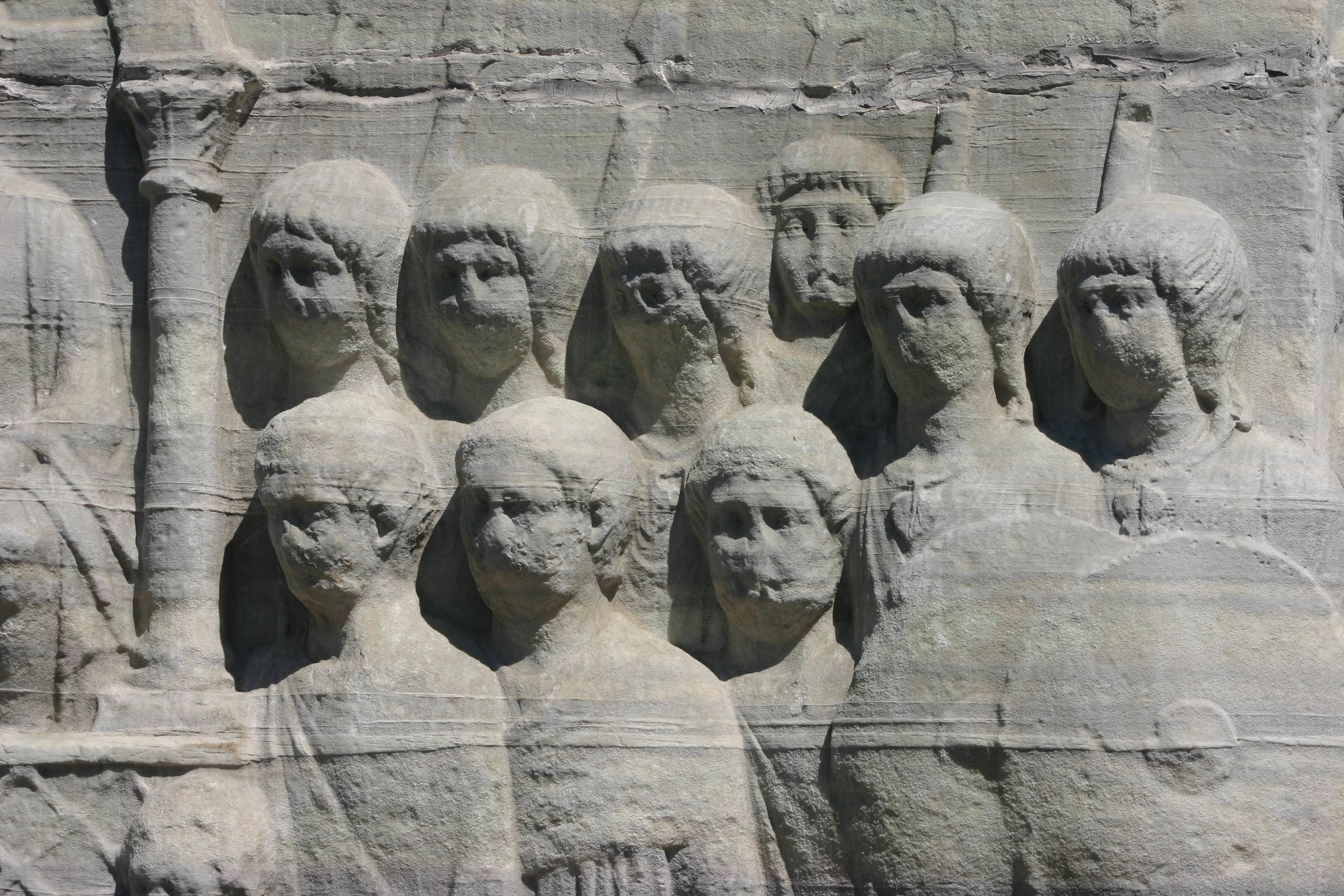
Late Roman soldiers, probably barbarians, as depicted (back row) by bas-relief on the base of Theodosius I's obelisk in Constantinople (c. 390). The troops belong to a regiment of palatini as they are here detailed to guard the emperor (left). More than third of soldiers in the palatini were barbarian-born by this time. Note the necklaces with regimental pendants and the long hair, a style imported by barbarian recruits, in contrast to the short hair that was the norm in the Principate

Barbari ("barbarians") was the generic term used by the Romans to denote peoples resident beyond the borders of the empire, and best translates as "foreigners" (it is derived from a Greek word meaning "to babble": a reference to their incomprehensible languages).

Most scholars believe that significant numbers of barbari were recruited throughout the Principate by the auxilia (the legions were closed to non-citizens). However, there is little evidence of this before the 3rd century. The scant evidence suggests that the vast majority, if not all, of auxilia were Roman peregrini (second-class citizens) or Roman citizens. In any case, the 4th-century army was probably much more dependent on barbarian recruitment than its 1st/2nd-century predecessor. The evidence for this may be summarised as follows:

1. The Notitia lists a number of barbarian military settlements in the empire. Known as laeti or gentiles ("natives"), these were an important source of recruits for the army. Groups of Germanic or Sarmatian tribespeople were granted land to settle in the Empire, in return for military service. Most likely each community was under a treaty obligation to supply a specified number of troops to the army each year. The resettlement within the empire of barbarian tribespeople in return for military service was not a new phenomenon in the 4th century: it stretches back to the days of Augustus. But it does appear that the establishment of military settlements was more systematic and on a much larger scale in the 4th century.
2. The Notitia lists a large number of units with barbarian names. This was probably the result of the transformation of irregular allied units serving under their own native officers (known as socii, or foederati) into regular formations. During the Principate, regular units with barbarian names are not attested until the 3rd century and even then rarely e.g. the ala I Sarmatarum attested in 3rd-century Britain, doubtless an offshoot of the Sarmatian horsemen posted there in 175.
3. The emergence of significant numbers of senior officers with barbarian names in the regular army, and eventually in the high command itself. In the early 5th century, the Western Roman forces were often controlled by barbarian-born generals or generals with some barbarian ancestry, such as Arbogast, Stilicho and Ricimer.
4. The adoption by the 4th-century army of barbarian (especially Germanic) dress, customs and culture, suggesting enhanced barbarian influence. For example, Roman army units adopted mock barbarian names e.g. Cornuti = "horned ones", a reference to the German custom of attaching horns to their helmets, and the barritus, a German warcry. Long hair became fashionable, especially in the palatini regiments, where barbarian-born recruits were numerous.

Quantification of the proportion of barbarian-born troops in the 4th-century army is highly speculative. Elton has undertaken the most detailed analysis of the meagre evidence. According to this analysis, about a quarter of the sample of army officers was barbarian-born in the period 350–400. Analysis by decade shows that this proportion did not increase over the period, or indeed in the early 5th century. The latter trend implies that the proportion of barbarians in the lower ranks was not much greater, otherwise the proportion of barbarian officers would have increased over time to reflect that.

If the proportion of barbarians was in the region of 25%, then it is probably much higher than in the 2nd-century regular army. If the same proportion had been recruited into the auxilia of the 2nd-century army, then in excess of 40% of recruits would have been barbarian-born, since the auxilia constituted 60% of the regular land army. There is no evidence that recruitment of barbarians was on such a large scale in the 2nd century. An analysis of named soldiers of non-Roman origin shows that 75% were Germanic: Franks, Alamanni, Saxons, Goths, and Vandals are attested in the Notitia unit names. Other significant sources of recruits were the Sarmatians from the Danubian lands; and Armenians and Iberians from the Caucasus region.

In contrast to Roman recruits, the vast majority of barbarian recruits were probably volunteers, drawn by conditions of service and career prospects that to them probably appeared desirable, in contrast to their living conditions at home. A minority of barbarian recruits were enlisted by compulsion, namely dediticii (barbarians who surrendered to the Roman authorities, often to escape strife with neighbouring tribes) and tribes who were defeated by the Romans, and obliged, as a condition of peace, to undertake to provide a specified number of recruits annually. Barbarians could be recruited directly, as individuals enrolled into regular regiments, or indirectly, as members of irregular foederati units transformed into regular regiments.

== Ranks, pay and benefits ==
=== Common soldiers ===
At the base of the rank pyramid were the common soldiers: pedes (infantryman) and eques (cavalryman). Unlike his 2nd-century counterpart, the 4th-century soldier's food and equipment was not deducted from his salary (stipendium), but was provided free. This is because the stipendium, paid in debased silver denarii, was under Diocletian worth far less than in the 2nd century. It lost its residual value under Constantine and ceased to be paid regularly in mid-4th century.

The soldier's sole substantial disposable income came from the donativa, or cash bonuses handed out periodically by the emperors, as these were paid in gold solidi (which were never debased), or in pure silver. There was a regular donative of 5 solidi every five years of an Augustus reign (i.e. one solidus p.a.) Also, on the accession of a new Augustus, 5 solidi plus a pound of silver (worth 4 solidi, totaling 9 solidi) were paid. The 12 Augusti that ruled the West between 284 and 395 averaged about nine years per reign. Thus the accession donatives would have averaged about 1 solidus p.a. The late soldier's disposable income would thus have averaged at least 2 solidi per annum. It is also possible, but undocumented, that the accession bonus was paid for each Augustus and/or a bonus for each Caesar. The documented income of 2 solidi was only a quarter of the disposable income of a 2nd-century legionary (which was the equivalent of c. 8 solidi). The late soldier's discharge package (which included a small plot of land) was also minuscule compared with a 2nd-century legionary's, worth just a tenth of the latter's.

Despite the disparity with the Principate, Jones and Elton argue that 4th-century remuneration was attractive compared to the hard reality of existence at subsistence level that most recruits' peasant families had to endure. Against that has to be set the clear unpopularity of military service.

However, pay would have been much more attractive in higher-grade units. The top of the pay pyramid were the scholae elite cavalry regiments. Next came palatini units, then comitatenses, and finally limitanei. There is little evidence about the pay differentials between grades. But that they were substantial is shown by the example that an actuarius (quartermaster) of a comitatus regiment was paid 50% more than his counterpart in a pseudocomitatensis regiment.

=== Regimental officers ===
Regimental officer grades in old-style units (legiones, alae and cohortes) remained the same as under the Principate up to and including centurion and decurion. In the new-style units, (vexillationes, auxilia, etc.), ranks with quite different names are attested, seemingly modelled on the titles of local authority bureaucrats. So little is known about these ranks that it is impossible to equate them with the traditional ranks with any certainty. Vegetius states that the ducenarius commanded, as the name implies, 200 men. If so, the centenarius may have been the equivalent of a centurion in the old-style units. Probably the most accurate comparison is by known pay levels:

Regimental officers in the 4th-century army
Multiple of basic pay (2nd century) or annona (4th century)	2nd-century cohors (ascending ranks)	4th-century units (ascending ranks)
1	pedes (infantryman)	pedes
1.5	tesserarius ("corporal")	semissalis
2	signifer (centuria standard-bearer) optio (centurion's deputy) vexillarius (cohort standard-bearer)	circitor biarchus
2.5 to 5		centenarius (2.5) ducenarius (3.5) senator (4) primicerius (5)
Over 5	centurio (centurion) centurio princeps (chief centurion) beneficiarius? (deputy cohort commander)	

NOTE: Ranks correspond only in pay scale, not necessarily in function

The table shows that the pay differentials enjoyed by the senior officers of a 4th-century regiment were much smaller than those of their 2nd-century counterparts, a position in line with the smaller remuneration enjoyed by 4th-century high administrative officials.

=== Regimental and corps commanders ===
Regimental and corps commanders in the 4th-century army
Pay scale (multiple of pedes)	Rank (ascending order)	No. of posts (Notitia)	Job description
12	Protector	Several hundreds (200 in domestici under Julian)	cadet regimental commander
n.a.	Tribunus (or praefectus)	c. 800	regimental commander
n.a.	Tribunus comes	n.a.	(i) commander, protectores domestici (comes domesticorum) (ii) commander, brigade of two twinned regiments or (iii) some (later all) tribuni of scholae (iv) some staff officers (tribuni vacantes) to magister or emperor
100	Dux (or, rarely, comes) limitis	27	border army commander
n.a.	Comes rei militaris	7	(i) commander, smaller diocesan comitatus
n.a.	Magister militum (magister equitum in West)	4	commander, larger diocesan comitatus
n.a.	Magister militum praesentalis (magister utriusque militiae in West)	3	commander, comitatus praesentalis

The table above indicates the ranks of officers who held a commission (sacra epistula, lit: "solemn letter"). This was presented to the recipient by the emperor in person at a dedicated ceremony.

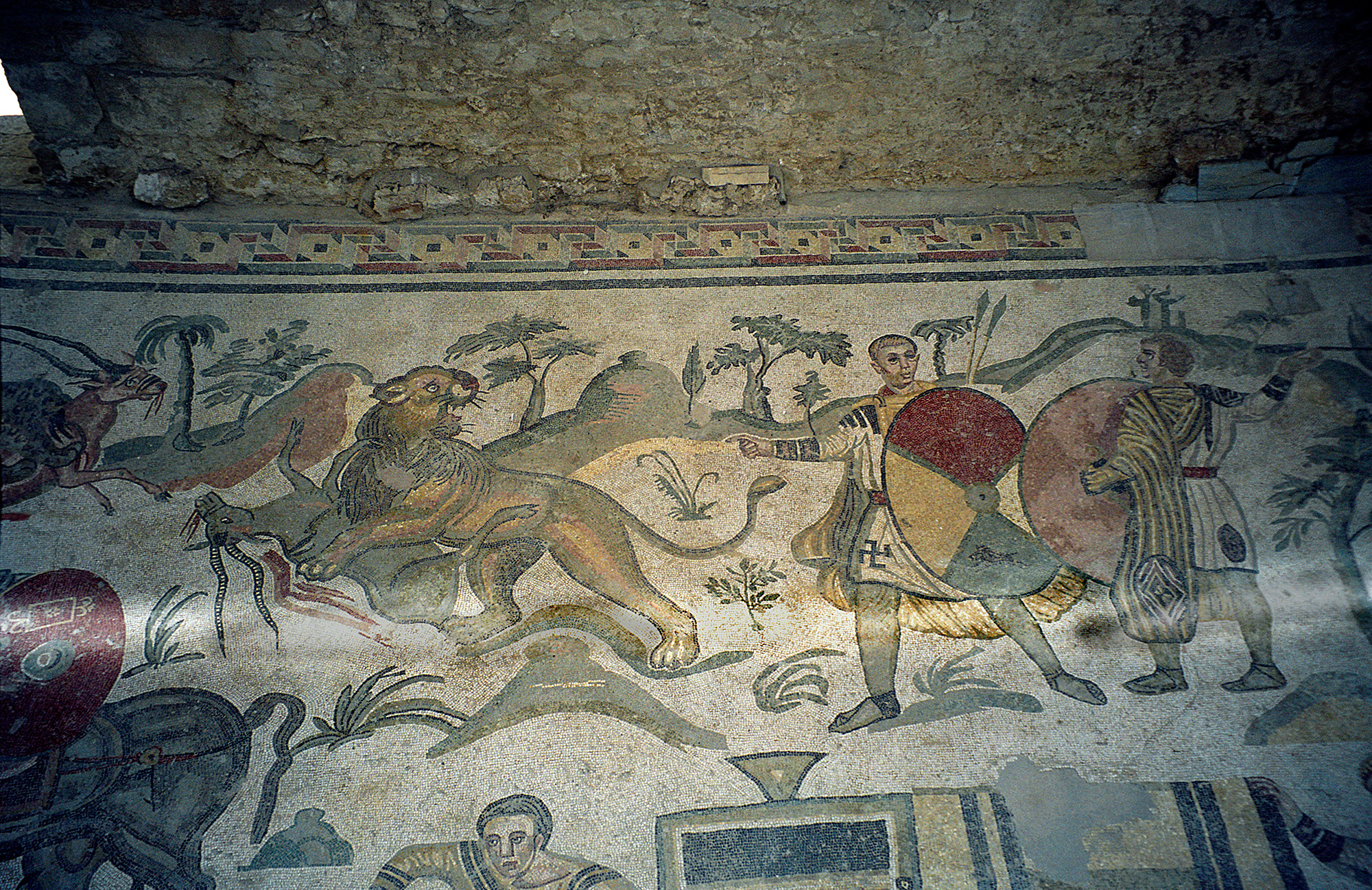
Detail of a 4th-century mosaic showing a hunting scene. The figures are probably Roman military officers, wearing the typical non-combat uniform (i.e. without armour and helmets, but with shield and spear) of late soldiers. (Throughout the imperial era, soldiers were usually portrayed in non-combat mode). Note the off-white, long-sleeved tunics. The swastika embroidered on the left tunic was a mystical symbol, possibly of Indo-European origin, representing the universe and was commonly used by the Romans as a decorative motif. Note also the military cloak (chlamys) and trousers. The pattern on the shield indicated the bearer's regiment. Note the bands embroidered on the sleeves and shoulders. From Piazza Armerina, Sicily

==== Cadet regimental commanders (protectores) ====
A significant innovation of the 4th century was the corps of protectores, which contained cadet senior officers. Although protectores were supposed to be soldiers who had risen through the ranks by meritorious service, it became a widespread practice to admit to the corps young men from outside the army (often the sons of senior officers). The protectores formed a corps that was both an officer training-school and pool of staff officers available to carry out special tasks for the magistri militum or the emperor. Those attached to the emperor were known as protectores domestici and organised in four scholae under a comes domesticorum. After a few years' service in the corps, a protector would normally be granted a commission by the emperor and placed in command of a military regiment.

==== Regimental commanders (tribuni) ====
Regimental commanders were known by one of three possible titles: tribunus (for comitatus regiments plus border cohortes), praefectus (most other limitanei regiments) or praepositus (for milites and some ethnic allied units). However, tribunus was used colloquially to denote the commander of any regiment. Although most tribuni were appointed from the corps of protectores, a minority, again mainly the sons of high-ranking serving officers, were directly commissioned outsiders. The status of regimental commanders varied enormously depending on the grade of their unit. At the top end, some commanders of scholae were granted the noble title of comes, a practice which became standard after 400.

==== Senior regimental commanders (tribuni comites) ====
The comitiva or "Order of Companions (of the emperor)", was an order of nobility established by Constantine I to honour senior administrative and military officials, especially in the imperial entourage. It partly overlapped with the established orders of Senators and of Knights, in that it could be awarded to members of either (or of neither). It was divided into three grades, of which only the first, comes primi ordinis (lit. "Companion of the First Rank", which carried senatorial rank), retained any value beyond AD 450, the others having been cheapened by excessive grants. In many cases, the title was granted ex officio, but it could also be purely honorary.

In the military sphere, the title of comes primi ordinis was granted to a group of senior tribuni. These included (1) the commander of the protectores domestici, who by 350 was known as the comes domesticorum; (2) some tribuni of scholae: after c. 400, scholae commanders were routinely granted the title on appointment; (3) the commanders of a brigade of two twinned comitatus regiments were apparently styled comites. (Such twinned regiments would always operate and transfer together e.g. the legions Ioviani and Herculiani); (4) finally, some tribunes without a regimental command (tribuni vacantes), who served as staff-officers to the emperor or to a magister militum, might be granted the title. These officers were not equal in military rank with a comes rei militaris, who was a corps commander (usually of a smaller diocesan comitatus), rather than the commander of only one or two regiments (or none).

==== Corps commanders (duces, comites rei militaris, magistri militum) ====
The commanders of army corps, i.e. army groups composed of several regiments, were known as (in ascending order of rank): duces limitis, comites rei militaris, and magistri militum. These officers corresponded in rank to generals and field marshals in modern armies.

A Dux (or, rarely, comes) limitis (lit. "Border Leader"), was in command of the troops (limitanei), and fluvial flotillas, deployed in a border province. Until the time of Constantine I, the dux reported to the vicarius of the diocese in which their forces were deployed. After c. 360, the duces generally reported to the commander of the comitatus deployed in their diocese (whether a magister militum or comes). However, they were entitled to correspond directly with the emperor, as various imperial rescripts show. A few border commanders were, exceptionally, styled comes e.g. the comes litoris Saxonici ("Count of the Saxon Shore") in Britain.

A Comes rei militaris (lit. "Companion for Military Affairs") was generally in command of a smaller diocesan comitatus (typically ca. 10,000 strong). By the time of the Notitia, comites were mainly found in the West, because of the fragmentation of the western comitatus into a number of smaller groups. In the East, there were 2 comites rei militaris, in command of Egypt and Isauria. Exceptionally, these men were in command of limitanei regiments only. Their title may be due to the fact that they reported, at the time to the Notitia, to the emperor direct (later they reported to the magister militum per Orientem). A comes rei militaris also had command over the border duces in his diocese.

A Magister militum (lit. "Master of Soldiers") commanded the larger diocesan comitatus (normally over 20,000-strong). A magister militum was also in command of the duces in the diocese where his comitatus was deployed.

The highest rank of Magister militum praesentalis (lit. "Master of Soldiers in the Presence [of the Emperor]") was accorded to the commanders of imperial escort armies (typically 20-30,000 strong). The title was equivalent in rank to Magister utriusque militiae ("Master of Both Services"), Magister equitum ("Master of Cavalry") and Magister peditum ("Master of Infantry").

It is unknown what proportion of the corps commanders had risen from the ranks, but it is likely to have been small as most rankers would be nearing retirement age by the time they were given command of a regiment and would be promoted no further. In contrast, directly commissioned protectores and tribuni dominated the higher echelons, as they were usually young men when they started. For such men, promotion to corps command could be swift e.g. the future emperor Theodosius I was a dux at age 28. It was also possible for rungs on the rank-ladder to be skipped. Commanders of scholae, who enjoyed direct access to the emperor, often reached the highest rank of magister militum: e.g. the barbarian-born officer Agilo was promoted direct to magister militum from tribunus of a schola in 360, skipping the dux stage.

== Equipment ==
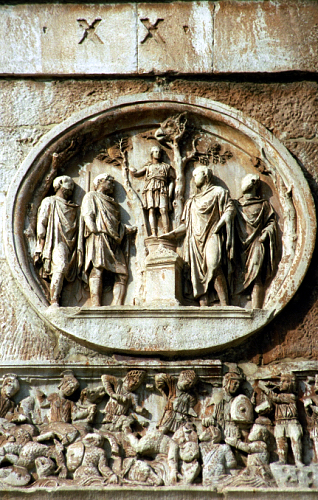
Frieze (bottom) showing Constantine I's cavalry driving Maxentius' troops into the River Tiber at the Battle of the Milvian Bridge (312). The image proves that 4th-century soldiers wore metal body armour (the Maxentian soldiers are wearing either mail or scale, it is unclear which). The Constantinian cavalry is apparently unarmoured, probably because these were units of Illyrian light cavalry (equites Dalmatae) and mounted archers. Detail from the Arch of Constantine, Rome

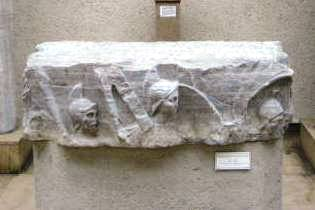
Detail of bas-relief on base of former Column of Theodosius in Constantinople (Istanbul). Date c. 390. Roman soldiers in action. Note soldier at centre had an Intercisa-style helmet with iron crest (prob. indicating officer rank) and is wearing chain-mail or scale armour, evidence that Vegetius's claim that infantry dropped helmets and armour in the later 4th century is mistaken. Istanbul Archaeological Museum

The basic equipment of a 4th-century foot soldier was essentially the same as in the 2nd century: metal armour cuirass, metal helmet, shield and sword. Some evolution took place during the 3rd century. Trends included the adoption of warmer clothing; the disappearance of distinctive legionary armour and weapons; the adoption by the infantry of equipment used by the cavalry in the earlier period; and the greater use of heavily armoured cavalry called cataphracts.

=== Clothing ===
In the 1st and 2nd centuries, a Roman soldier's clothes consisted of a single-piece, short-sleeved tunic, the hem of which reached the knees, and special hobnailed sandals (caligae). This attire, which left the arms and legs bare, had evolved in a Mediterranean climate and was not suitable for northern Europe in cold weather. In northern Europe, long-sleeved tunics, trousers (bracae), socks (worn inside the caligae) and laced boots were commonly worn in winter from the 1st century. During the 3rd century, these items of clothing became much more widespread, apparently common in Mediterranean provinces also. However, it is likely that in warmer weather, trousers were dispensed with and caligae worn instead of socks and boots. Late Roman clothing was often highly decorated, with woven or embroidered strips, clavi, circular roundels, orbiculi, or square panels, tabulae, added to tunics and cloaks. These colourful decorative elements usually consisted of geometrical patterns and stylised plant motifs, but could include human or animal figures. A distinctive part of a soldier's costume, though it seems to have also been worn by non-military bureaucrats, was a type of round, brimless hat known as the pannonian cap (pileus pannonicus).

=== Armour ===
Legionary soldiers of the 1st and 2nd centuries had use of the lorica segmentata, or laminated-strip cuirass, as well as mail (lorica hamata) and scale armour (lorica squamata). Testing of modern copies have demonstrated that segmentata was impenetrable to most direct and missile strikes. It was, however, uncomfortable: reenactors have discovered that chafing renders it painful to wear for longer than a few hours at a time, and it was also expensive to produce and difficult to maintain. In the 3rd century, the segmentata appears to have fallen out of use and troops were depicted wearing mail or scale.

In either the 390s or the 430s), Vegetius reports that soldiers no longer wore armour:

From the foundation of the city till the reign of the Emperor Gratian, the foot wore cuirasses and helmets. But negligence and sloth having by degrees introduced a total relaxation of discipline, the soldiers began to think their armor too heavy, as they seldom put it on. They first requested leave from the Emperor to lay aside the cuirass and afterwards the helmet. In consequence of this, our troops in their engagements with the Goths were often overwhelmed with their showers of arrows. Nor was the necessity of obliging the infantry to resume their cuirasses and helmets discovered, notwithstanding such repeated defeats, which brought on the destruction of so many great cities. Troops, defenseless and exposed to all the weapons of the enemy, are more disposed to fly than fight. What can be expected from a foot-archer without cuirass or helmet, who cannot hold at once his bow and shield; or from the ensigns whose bodies are naked, and who cannot at the same time carry a shield and the colors? The foot soldier finds the weight of a cuirass and even of a helmet intolerable. This is because he is so seldom exercised and rarely puts them on.

It is possible that Vegetius' statements about the abandonment of armour were a misinterpretation by him of sources mentioning Roman soldiers fighting without armour in more open formations during the Gothic wars of the 370s. Evidence that armour continued to be worn by Roman soldiers, including infantry, throughout the period is widespread.

The artistic record shows most late Roman soldiers wearing metal armour. For example, illustrations in the Notitia Dignitatum, compiled after the reign of Gratian, indicate that the army's fabricae (arms factories) were producing mail armour at the end of the 4th century. The Vatican Virgil manuscript, early 5th century, and the Column of Arcadius, reigned 395 to 408, both show armoured soldiers. Actual examples of quite large sections of mail have been recovered, at Trier (with a section of scale), Independența, and Weiler-la-Tour, within a late 4th-century context. Officers and some soldiers may have worn muscle cuirasses, together with decorative pteruges. In contrast to the earlier segmentata plate armour, which afforded no protection for the arms or below the hips, some pictorial and sculptural representations of Late Roman soldiers show mail or scale armours giving more extensive protection. These armours had full-length sleeves and were long enough to protect the thighs.

The catafractarii and clibanarii cavalry, from limited pictorial evidence and especially from the description of these troops by Ammianus, may have worn specialised forms of armour. In particular their limbs were protected by laminated defences, made up of curved and overlapping metal segments: "Laminarum circuli tenues apti corporis flexibus ambiebant per omnia membra diducti" (Thin circles of iron plates, fitted to the curves of their bodies, completely covered their limbs). Such laminated defences are attested by a fragment of manica found at Bowes Moor, dating to the late 4th century.

=== Helmets ===
In general, Roman cavalry helmets had enhanced protection, in the form of wider cheek-guards and deeper neck-guards, for the sides and back of the head than infantry helmets. Infantry were less vulnerable in those parts due to their tighter formation when fighting. During the 3rd century, infantry helmets tended to adopt the more protective features of Principate cavalry helmets. Cheek-guards could often be fastened together over the chin to protect the face, and covered the ears save for a slit to permit hearing e.g. the "Auxiliary E" type or its Niederbieber variant. Cavalry helmets became even more enclosed e.g. the "Heddernheim" type, which is close to the medieval great helm, but at the cost much reduced vision and hearing.

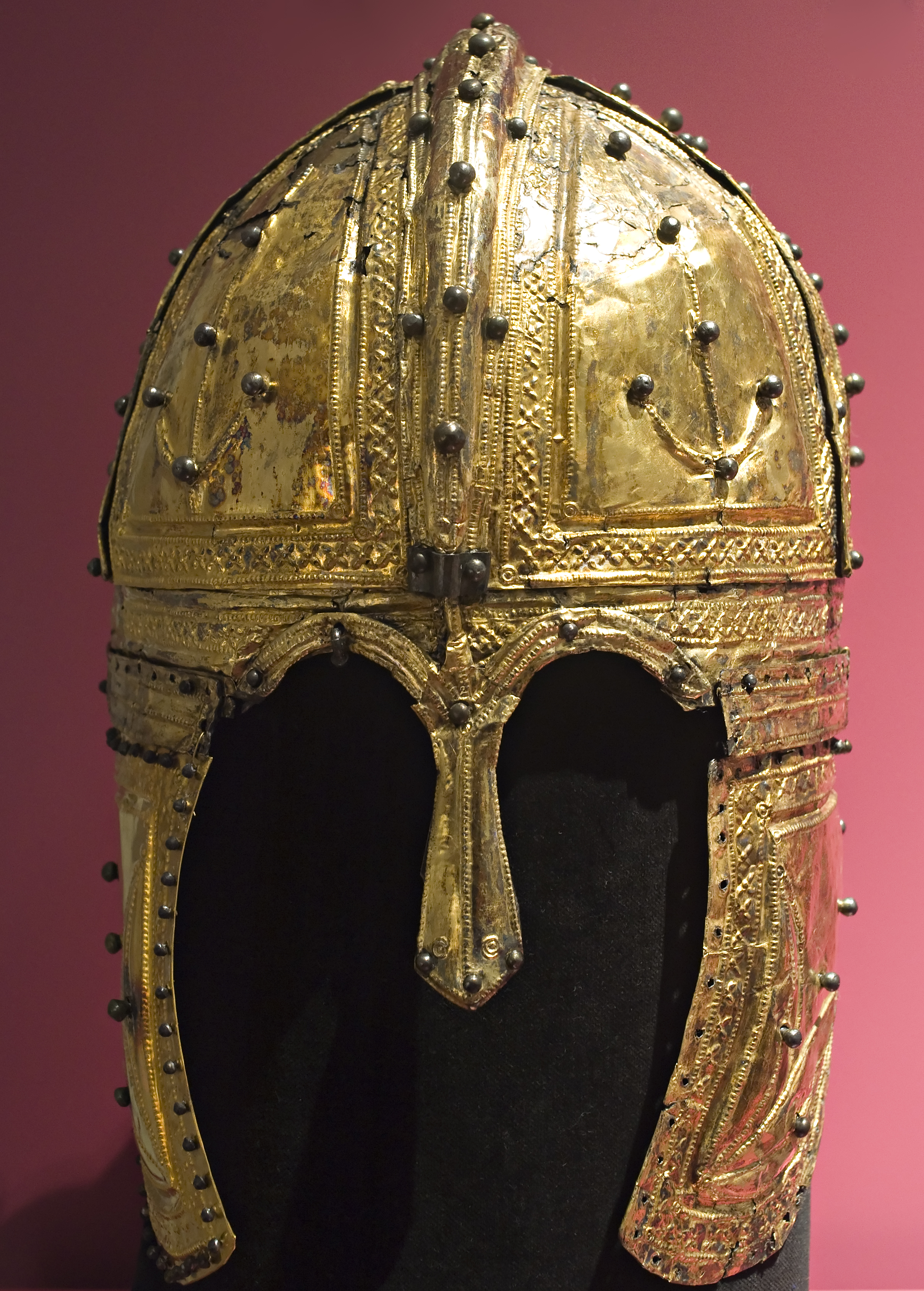
Late Roman helmet, called the Deurne helmet. It is covered in expensive silver-gilt sheathing and is inscribed to a cavalryman of the equites stablesiani.

In the late 3rd century a complete break in Roman helmet design occurred. Previous Roman helmet types, based ultimately on Celtic designs, were replaced by new forms derived from helmets developed in the Sassanid Empire. The new helmet types were characterised by a skull constructed from multiple elements united by a medial ridge, and are referred to as ridge helmets. They are divided into two sub-groups, the "Intercisa" and "Berkasovo" types. The "Intercisa" design had a two-piece skull, it left the face unobstructed and had ear-holes in the join between the small cheek-guards and bowl to allow good hearing. It was simpler and cheaper to manufacture, and therefore probably by far the most common type, but structurally weaker and therefore offered less effective protection. The "Berkasovo" type was a more sturdy and protective ridge helmet. This type of helmet usually has 4 to 6 skull elements (and the characteristic median ridge), a nasal (nose-guard), a deep brow piece riveted inside the skull elements and large cheekpieces. Unusually the helmet discovered at Burgh Castle, in England, is of the Berkasovo method of construction, but has cheekpieces with earholes. Face-guards of mail or in the form of metal 'anthropomorphic masks' with eye-holes were often added to the helmets of the heaviest forms of cavalry, especially catafractarii or clibanarii.

Despite the apparent cheapness of manufacture of their basic components, many surviving examples of Late Roman helmets, including the Intercisa type, show evidence of expensive decoration in the form of silver or silver-gilt sheathing. A possible explanation is that most of the surviving exemplars may have belonged to officers and that silver- or gold-plating denoted rank; and, in the case of mounted gemstones, high rank. Other academics, in contrast, consider that silver-sheathed helmets may have been widely worn by comitatenses soldiers, given as a form of pay or reward. Roman law indicates that all helmets of this construction were supposed to be sheathed in a specific amount of gold or silver.

=== Shields ===
The classic legionary scutum, a convex rectangular shield, also disappeared during the 3rd century. All troops except archers adopted large, wide, usually dished, ovoid (or sometimes round) shields. These shields were still called Scuta or Clipei, despite the difference in shape. Shields, from examples found at Dura Europos and Nydam, were of vertical plank construction, the planks glued, and mostly faced inside and out with painted leather. The edges of the shield were bound with stitched rawhide, which shrank as it dried, improving structural cohesion.

=== Hand weapons ===
The gladius, a short (median length: 460 mm/18 inches) stabbing-sword that was designed for close-quarters fighting, and was standard for the infantry of the Principate (both legionary and auxiliary), also was phased out during the 3rd century. The infantry adopted the spatha, a longer (median length: 760 mm/30 in) sword that during the earlier centuries was used by the cavalry only. In addition, Vegetius mentions the use of a shorter-bladed sword termed a semispatha. At the same time, infantry acquired a thrusting-spear (hasta) which became the main close order combat weapon to replace the gladius. These trends imply a greater emphasis on fighting the enemy "at arm's length". In the 4th century, there is no archaeological or artistic evidence of the pugio (Roman military dagger), which is attested until the 3rd century. 4th-century graves have yielded short, single-edged knives in conjunction with military belt fittings.

=== Missiles ===
In addition to his thrusting-spear, a late foot soldier might carry a spiculum, a kind of pilum, similar to an angon. Alternatively, he may have been armed with short javelins (verruta or lanceae). Late Roman infantrymen often carried half a dozen lead-weighted throwing-darts called plumbatae (from plumbum = "lead"), with an effective range of c. 30 m (98 ft), well beyond that of a javelin. The darts were carried clipped to the back of the shield or in a quiver. The late foot soldier thus had greater missile capability than his predecessor from the Principate, who was often limited to just two pila. Late Roman archers continued to use the recurved composite bow as their principal weapon. This was a sophisticated, compact and powerful weapon, suitable for mounted and foot archers alike. A small number of archers may have been armed with crossbows (manuballistae).

== Supply infrastructure ==
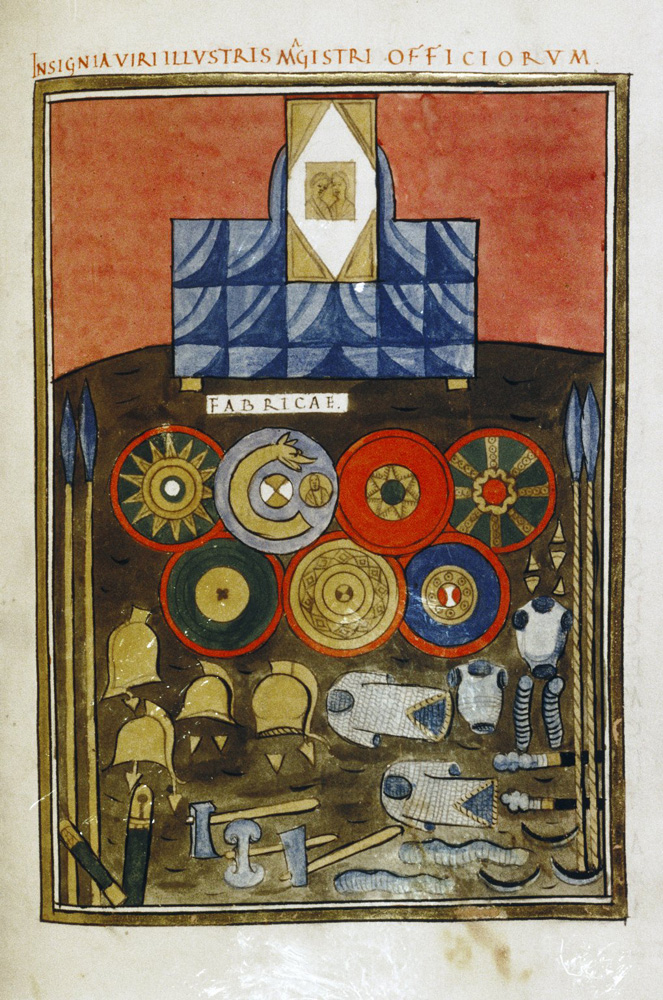
The products of the fabricae, from the Notitia dignitatum. The illustration includes: helmets, shields, mail coats, cuirasses and laminated limb defences, plus various weapons.

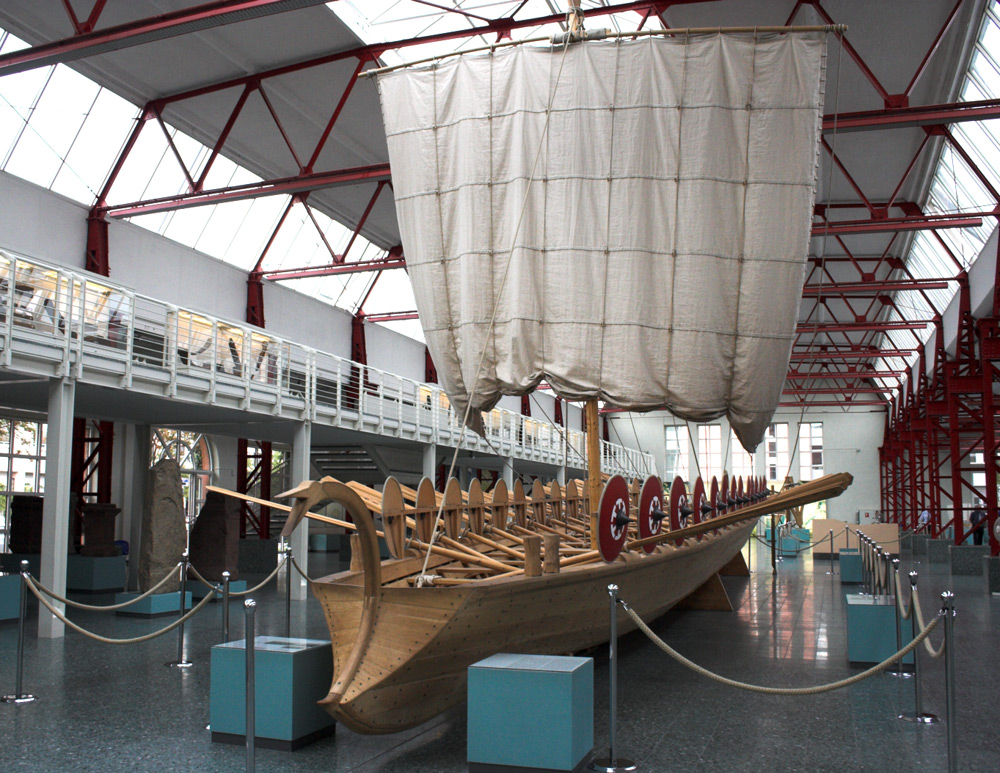
Full-scale reconstruction of a 4th-century Roman river patrol-boat (lusoria), probably under the command of the dux of Germania I province. It is based on the remains of one of five late Roman river boats discovered at Moguntiacum in the early 1980s. The boat above, denoted Mainz Type A, had a long (22 m) and narrow (2.8 m) shape for speed and rounded keel to allow access to shallows. It could carry 32 marines, who rowed the boat fully armed (32 oars, 16 on each side). Whilst on board, the soldiers would hang their shields on stands fixed to the gunwales so as to provide cover from missiles launched from the riverbanks. Museum für Antike Schifffahrt, Mainz, Germany

A critical advantage enjoyed by the late army over all its foreign enemies except the Persians was a highly sophisticated organisation to ensure that the army was properly equipped and supplied on campaign. Like their enemies, the late army could rely on foraging for supplies when campaigning on enemy soil. But this was obviously undesirable on Roman territory and impractical in winter, or in spring before the harvest. The empire's complex supply organisation enabled the army to campaign in all seasons and in areas where the enemy employed a "scorched earth" policy.

=== Supply organisation ===
The responsibility for supplying the army rested with the praefectus praetorio of the operational sector. He in turn controlled a hierarchy of civilian authorities (diocesan vicarii and provincial governors), whose agents collected, stored and delivered supplies to the troops directly or to predetermined fortified points. The quantities involved were enormous and would require lengthy and elaborate planning for major campaigns. A late legion of 1,000 men would require a minimum of 2.3 tonnes of grain-equivalent every day. An imperial escort army of 25,000 men would thus require around 5,000 tonnes of grain-equivalent for three months' campaigning (plus fodder for the horses and pack animals).

=== Supply transport ===
Such vast cargoes would be carried by boat as far as possible, by sea and/or river, and only the shortest possible distance overland. That is because transport on water was far more economical than on land (as it remains today, although the differential is smaller).

Land transport of military supplies on the cursus publicus (imperial transport service) was typically by wagons (angariae), with a maximum legal load of 1,500 lbs (680 kg), drawn by two pairs of oxen. The payload capacity of most Roman freighter-ships of the period was in the range of 10,000–20,000 modii (70–140 tonnes) although many of the grain freighters supplying Rome were much larger up 350 tonnes and a few giants which could load 1200 like the Isis which Lucian saw in Athens circa 180 A.D. Thus, a vessel of median capacity of 100 tonnes, with a 20-man crew, could carry the same load as c. 150 wagons (which required 150 drivers and 600 oxen, plus pay for the former and fodder for the animals). A merchant ship would also, with a favourable wind, typically travel three times faster than the typical 3 km/h (2 mph) achieved by the wagons and for as long as there was daylight, whereas oxen could only haul for at most 5 hours per day. Thus freighters could easily cover 100 km (62 mi) per day, compared to c. 15 km (9 mi) by the wagons. Against this must be set the fact that most freighters of this capacity were propelled by square sails only (and no oars). They could only progress if there was a following wind, and could spend many days in port waiting for one. (However, smaller coastal and fluvial freighters called actuariae combined oars with sail and had more flexibility). Maritime transport was also completely suspended for at least four months in the winter (as stormy weather made it too hazardous) and even during the rest of the year, shipwrecks were common. Nevertheless, the surviving shipping-rates show that it was cheaper to transport a cargo of grain by sea from Syria to Lusitania (i.e. the entire length of the Mediterranean – and a ways beyond – c. 5,000 km) than just 110 km (68 mi) overland.

On rivers, actuariae could operate year-round, except during periods when the rivers were ice-bound or of high water (after heavy rains or thaw), when the river-current was dangerously strong. It is likely that the establishment of the empire's frontier on the Rhine-Danube line was dictated by the logistical need for large rivers to accommodate supply ships more than by defensibility. These rivers were dotted with purpose-built military docks (portus exceptionales). The protection of supply convoys on the rivers was the responsibility of the fluvial flotillas (classes) under the command of the riverine duces. The Notitia gives no information about the Rhine flotillas (as the Rhine frontier had collapsed by the time the Western section was compiled), but mentions 4 classes Histricae (Danube flotillas) and 8 other classes in tributaries of the Danube. Each flotilla was commanded by a praefectus classis who reported to the local dux. It appears that each dux on the Danube disposed of at least one flotilla (one, the dux Pannoniae, controlled three).

=== Weapons manufacture ===
In the 4th century, the production of weapons and equipment was highly centralised (and presumably standardised) in a number of major state-run arms factories, or fabricae, documented in the Notitia. It is unknown when these were first established, but they certainly existed by the time of Diocletian. In the 2nd century, there is evidence of fabricae inside legionary bases and even in the much smaller auxiliary forts, staffed by the soldiers themselves. But there is no evidence, literary or archaeological, of fabricae outside military bases and staffed by civilians during the Principate (although their existence cannot be excluded, as no archaeological evidence has been found for the late fabricae either). Late fabricae were located in border provinces and dioceses. Some were general manufacturers producing both armour and weapons (fabrica scutaria et armorum) or just one of the two. Others were specialised in one or more of the following: fabrica spatharia (sword manufacture), lanciaria (spears), arcuaria (bows), sagittaria (arrows), loricaria (body armour), clibanaria (cataphract armour), and ballistaria (catapults).

== Fortifications ==
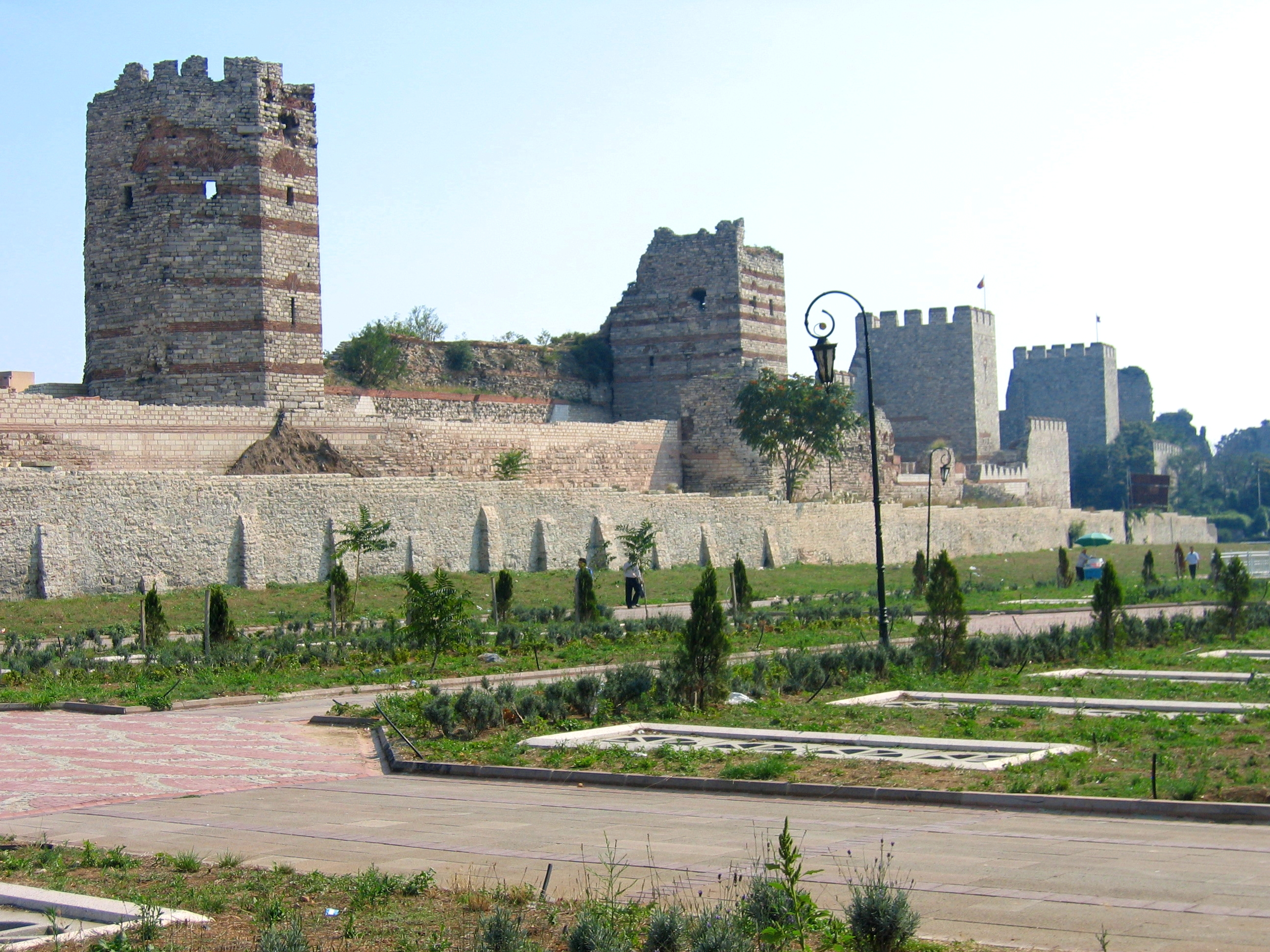
The Walls of Theodosius II at Constantinople, built 408–413, to increase the area of land protected by the original Constantinian walls. Note the massive crenellated towers and surviving sections of wall. The walls actually consisted of a triple curtain, each one overlooking the other. They proved impregnable to even the largest armies until the introduction of explosive artillery in the later Middle Ages

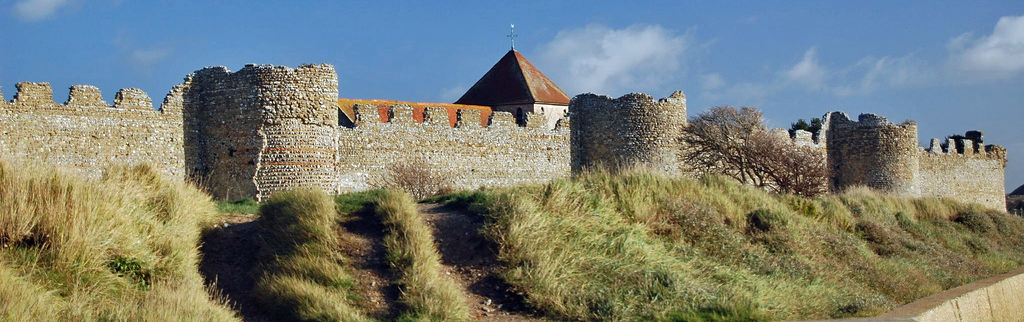
An example of late Roman fortification. Note the protruding towers to allow enfilading fire. The original height of both walls and towers was clearly greater than today, and the crenellations are not the original ones, but crudely cut from the curtain wall itself in the medieval period. The church visible inside the walls was built in the 12th century by the Normans. Portchester Castle, England. 3rd century

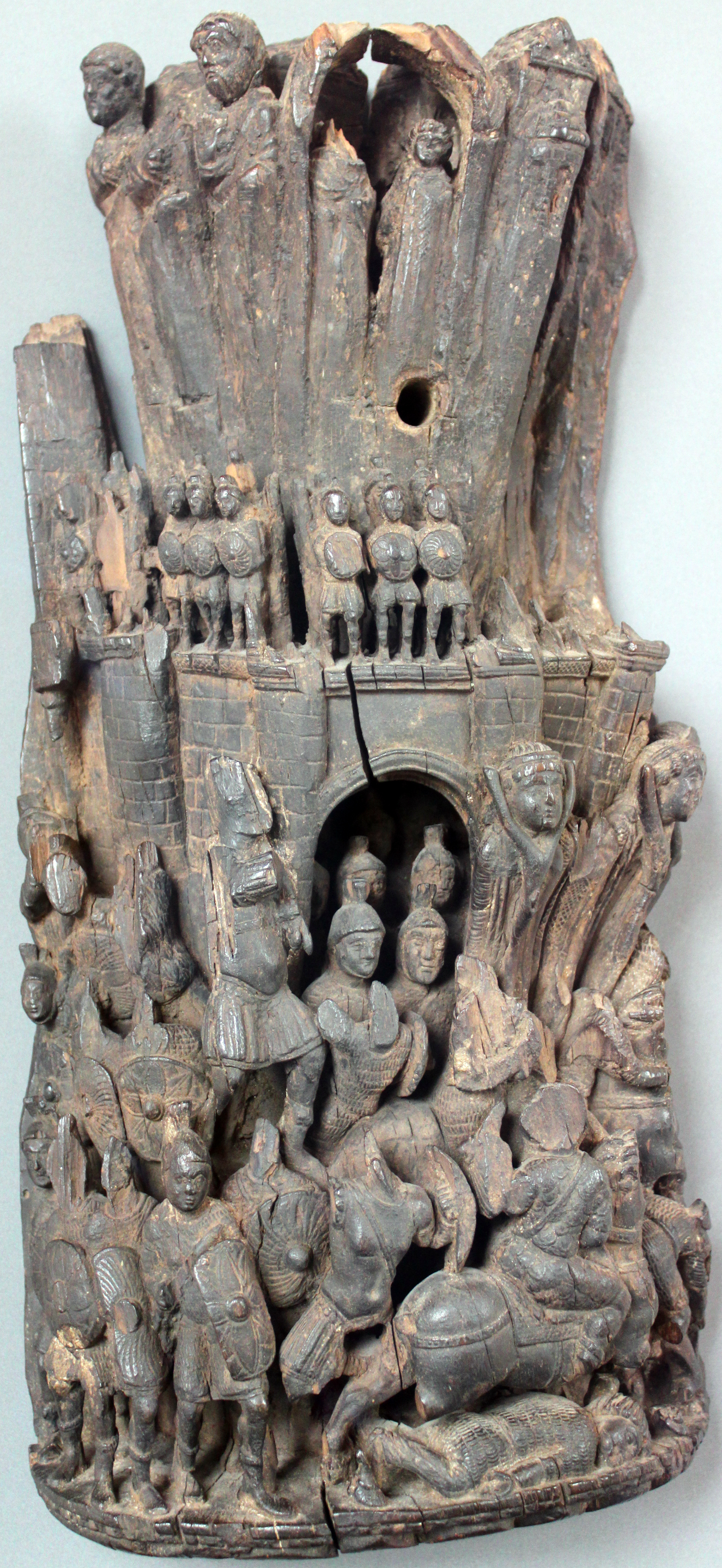
Relief with the liberation of a besieged city; Western Roman Empire, early 5th century, Museum of Byzantine Art (inv. 4782), Bode Museum, Berlin. Both cavalry and infantry are shown wearing body armour.

Compared to the 1st and 2nd centuries, the 3rd and 4th centuries saw much greater fortification activity, with many new forts built. Later Roman fortifications, both new and upgraded old ones, contained much stronger defensive features than their earlier counterparts. In addition, the late 3rd/4th centuries saw the fortification of many towns and cities including the City of Rome itself and its eastern sister, Constantinople.

According to Luttwak, Roman forts of the 1st/2nd centuries, whether castra legionaria (inaccurately translated as legionary "fortresses") or auxiliary forts, were clearly residential bases that were not designed to withstand assault. The typical rectangular "playing-card" shape, the long, thin and low walls and shallow ditch and the unfortified gates were not defensible features and their purpose was delimitation and keeping out individual intruders. This view is too extreme, as all the evidence suggests that such forts, even the more rudimentary earlier type based on the design of marching-camps (ditch, earth rampart and wooden palisade), afforded a significant level of protection. The latter is exemplified by the siege of the legionary camp at Castra Vetera (Xanten) during the revolt of the Batavi in 69–70 AD. 5,000 legionaries succeeded in holding out for several months against vastly superior numbers of rebel Batavi and their allies under the renegade auxiliary officer Civilis, despite the latter disposing of c. 8,000 Roman-trained and equipped auxiliary troops and deploying Roman-style siege engines. (The Romans were eventually forced to surrender the fort by starvation).

Nevertheless, later forts were undoubtedly built to much higher defensive specifications than their 2nd-century predecessors, including the following features:

1. Deeper (average: 3 m) and much wider (av. 10 m) perimeter ditches (fossae). These would have flat floors rather than the traditional V-shape. Such ditches would make it difficult to bring siege equipment (ladders, rams, and other engines) to the walls. It would also concentrate attackers in an enclosed area where they would be exposed to missile fire from the walls.
2. Higher (av. 9 m) and thicker (av. 3 m) walls. Walls were made of stone or stone facing with rubble core. The greater thickness would protect the wall from enemy mining. The height of the walls would force attackers to use scaling-ladders. The parapet of the rampart would have crenellations to provide protection from missiles for defenders.
3. Higher (av. 17.5 m) and projecting corner and interval towers. These would enable enfilading fire on attackers. Towers were normally round or half-round, and only rarely square as the latter were less defensible. Towers would be normally be spaced at 30 m (98 ft) intervals on circuit walls.
4. Gate towers, one on each side of the gate and projecting out from the gate to allow defenders to shoot into the area in front of the entrance. The gates themselves were normally wooden with metal covering plates to prevent destruction by fire. Some gates had portcullises. Postern gates were built into towers or near them to allow sorties.

More numerous than new-build forts were old forts upgraded to higher defensive specifications. Thus the two parallel ditches common around earlier forts could be joined by excavating the ground between them. Projecting towers were added. Gates were either rebuilt with projecting towers or sealed off by constructing a large rectangular bastion. The walls were strengthened by doubling the old thickness. Upgraded forts were generally much larger than new-build. New forts were rarely over one hectare in size and were normally placed to fill gaps between old forts and towns. However, not all of the old forts that continued to be used in the 4th century were upgraded e.g. the forts on Hadrian's Wall and some other forts in Britannia were not significantly modified.

The main features of late Roman fortification clearly presage those of medieval castles. But the defensibility of late Roman forts must not be exaggerated. Late Roman forts were not always located on defensible sites, such as hilltops and they were not designed as independent logistic facilities where the garrison could survive for years on internal supplies (water in cisterns or from wells and stored food). They remained bases for troops that would sally out and engage the enemy in the field.

Nevertheless, the benefits of more defensible forts are evident: they could act as temporary refuges for overwhelmed local troops during barbarian incursions, while they waited for reinforcements. The forts were difficult for the barbarians to take by assault, as they generally lacked the necessary equipment. The forts could store sufficient supplies to enable the defenders to hold out for a few weeks, and to supply relieving troops. They could also act as bases from which defenders could make sorties against isolated groups of barbarians and to cooperate with relieving forces.

The question arises as to why the 4th-century army needed forts with enhanced defensive features whereas the 2nd-century army apparently did not. Luttwak argues that defensible forts were an integral feature of a 4th-century defence-in-depth "grand strategy", while in the 2nd century "preclusive defence" rendered such forts unnecessary . But the existence of such a "strategy" is strongly disputed by several scholars, as many elements of the late Roman army's posture were consistent with continued forward defence. An alternative explanation is that preclusive defence was still in effect but was not working as well as previously and barbarian raids were penetrating the empire more frequently.(see Strategy, below)

== Strategy and tactics ==
=== Strategy ===
Edward Luttwak's Grand Strategy of the Roman Empire (1976) re-launched the thesis of Theodor Mommsen that in the 3rd and early 4th centuries, the empire's defence strategy mutated from "forward defence" (or "preclusive defence") in the Principate to "defence-in-depth" in the 4th century. According to Luttwak, the army of the Principate had relied on neutralising imminent barbarian incursions before they reached the imperial borders. This was achieved by stationing units (both legions and auxiliary regiments) right on the border and establishing and garrisoning strategic salients beyond the borders. The response to any threat would thus be a pincer movement into barbarian territory: large infantry and cavalry forces from the border bases would immediately cross the border to intercept the coalescing enemy army.

According to Luttwak, the forward defence system was always vulnerable to unusually large barbarian concentrations of forces, as the Roman army was too thinly spread along the enormous borders to deal with such threats. In addition, the lack of any reserves to the rear of the border entailed that a barbarian force that successfully penetrated the perimeter defences would have unchallenged ability to rampage deep into the empire before Roman reinforcements from other border garrisons could arrive to intercept them.

The essential feature of defence-in-depth, according to Luttwak, was an acceptance that the Roman frontier provinces themselves would become the main combat-zone in operations against barbarian threats, rather than the barbarian lands across the border. Under this strategy, border-forces (limitanei) would not attempt to repel a large incursion. Instead, they would retreat into fortified strongholds and wait for mobile forces (comitatenses) to arrive and intercept the invaders. Border-forces would be substantially weaker than under forward defence, but their reduction in numbers (and quality) would be compensated by the establishment of much stronger fortifications to protect themselves.

But the validity of Luttwak's thesis has been strongly contested by a number of scholars, especially in a powerful critique by B. Isaac, the author of a leading study of the Roman army in the East (1992). Isaac claims that the empire did not have the intelligence capacity or centralised military planning to sustain a grand strategy e.g. there was no equivalent to a modern army's general staff. In any case, claims Isaac, the empire was not interested in "defence" at all: it was fundamentally aggressive both in ideology and military posture, up to and including the 4th century.

Furthermore, there is a lack of substantial archaeological or literary evidence to support the defence-in-depth theory. J.C. Mann points out that there is no evidence, either in the Notitia Dignitatum or in the archaeological record, that units along the Rhine or Danube were stationed in the border hinterlands. On the contrary, virtually all forts identified as built or occupied in the 4th century on the Danube lay on, very near or even beyond the river, strikingly similar to the 2nd-century distribution.

Another supposed element of "defence-in-depth" were the comitatus praesentales (imperial escort-armies) stationed in the interior of the empire. A traditional view is that the escort-armies' role was precisely as a strategic reserve of last resort that could intercept really large barbarian invasions that succeeded in penetrating deep into the empire (such as the invasions of the late 3rd century). But these large comitatus were not established before 312, by which time there had not been a successful barbarian invasion for c. 40 years. Also Luttwak himself admits that they were too distant from the frontier to be of much value in intercepting barbarian incursions. Their arrival in theatre could take weeks, if not months. Although the comitatus praesentales are often described as "mobile field-armies", in this context "immobile" would be a more accurate description. Hence the mainstream modern view that the central role of comitatus praesentales was to provide emperors with insurance against usurpers.

Luttwak terminates his analysis at the end of Constantine's reign, before the establishment of the diocesan comitatus. Unlike the imperial escort-armies, these were close enough to the theatre of operations to succour the border troops. But their stationing may have differed little from the location of legions in the 2nd century, even though they apparently wintered inside cities, rather than in purpose-built legionary bases. For example, the two comitatus of Illyricum (East and West) are documented as wintering in Sirmium, which was the site of a major legionary base in the Principate.

Furthermore, the late empire maintained a central feature of the forward defence of the Principate: a system of treaties of mutual assistance with tribes living on the imperial frontiers. The Romans would promise to defend the ally from attack by its neighbours. In return, the ally would promise to refrain from raiding imperial territory, and prevent neighbouring tribes from doing the same. Although the allies would officially be denoted tributarii (i.e. subject to paying tribute to Rome, in cash or in kind), in practice the loyalty of the ally was often secured by gifts or regular subsidies from Rome. This practice was applied on all the frontiers. The Romans continued to assist the client tribes to defend themselves in the 4th century. For example, Constantine I's army constructed two massive lines of defensive earthworks, 100–250 km beyond the Danube, totalling c. 1,500 km (932 mi) in length, the Devil's Dykes in Hungary/Romania and the Brazda lui Novac de Nord in Romania. Garrisoned by a mix of Roman and native troops, their purpose was to protect Dacian and Sarmatian tributary tribes of the Tisza and Wallachian plains against Gothic incursions. This created a Transdanubian buffer zone, extending from Aquincum (Budapest) all the way to the Danube delta, obviously contradicting the proposition that the empire's Danubian border provinces were themselves envisaged as buffer zones. This was especially unlikely in the case of these regions, as the Illyrian emperors and officer class that dominated the late army would hardly relish seeing their native provinces reduced to combat zones.

Late Roman emperors continued major and frequent offensive operations beyond the imperial borders throughout the 4th century. These were strikingly similar to the pincer movements described by Luttwak as being characteristic of forward defence in the early Principate. For example, Valentinian I's campaign against the Quadi in 375. Julian in 356–60 and Valentinian I in 368–74 carried out several operations across the Rhine and Danube designed to force the submission of local tribes and their acceptance of tributarii status.

The late army's "defence" posture thus contains many elements that are similar to that of the army of the Principate, raising the question of whether defence-in-depth was ever in reality contemplated (or implemented) as a strategy. But the debate about defence-in-depth is still very much alive in academic circles.

=== Role of cavalry ===
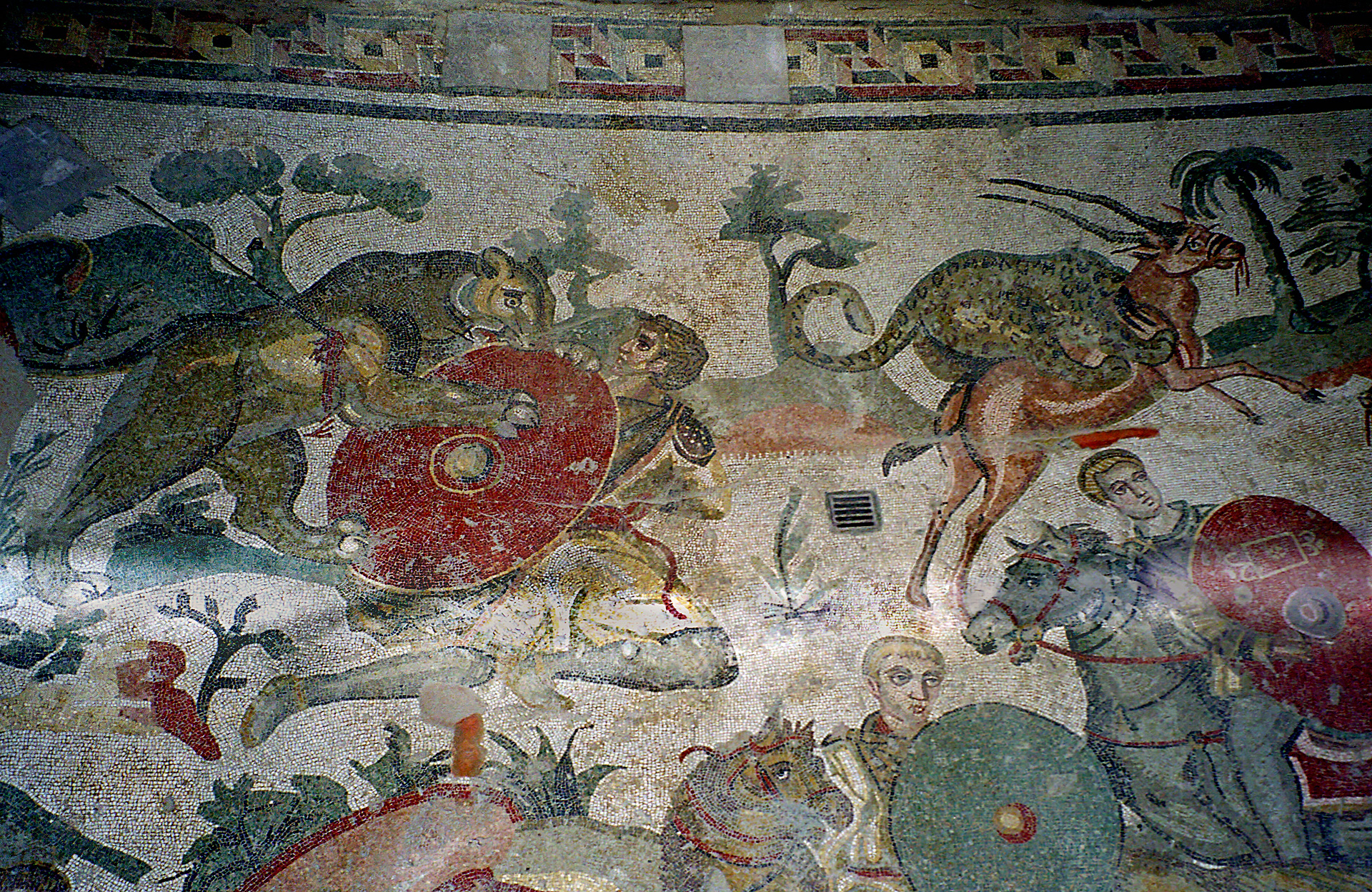
Late Roman cavalry officers (bottom right) in a hunting scene. In combat, most cavalrymen would, like infantry, wear a mail shirt and helmet. Mosaic from Piazza Armerina, Sicily. 4th century

A traditional thesis is that cavalry assumed a much greater importance in the 4th-century army than it enjoyed in the 2nd century. According to this view, cavalry increased significantly as a proportion of the total forces and took over the leading tactical role from the infantry. It also enjoyed much higher status than in the 2nd century. At the same time, the infantry declined in efficiency and value in operations, leaving the cavalry as the effective arm. In fact, there is no good evidence to support this view, and plenty of evidence against it.

As regards numbers, the mid-2nd-century army contained c. 80,000 cavalry out of c. 385,000 total effectives i.e. cavalry constituted c. 21% of the total forces. For the late army, about one third of the army units in the Notitia are cavalry, but in numbers cavalry were a smaller proportion of the total because cavalry units were on average smaller than infantry units. For example, in the comitatus, cavalry vexillationes were probably half the size of infantry legiones. Overall, the available evidence suggests that the proportion of cavalry was much the same as in the 2nd century. Examples: in 478, a comitatus of 38,000 men contained 8,000 cavalry (21%). In 357, the comitatus of Gaul, 13–15,000 strong, contained an estimated 3,000 cavalry (20–23%).

As a consequence, most battles in the 4th century were, as in previous centuries, primarily infantry encounters, with cavalry playing a supporting role. The main qualification is that on the Eastern frontier, cavalry played a more prominent role, due to the Persian reliance on cavalry as their main arm. This obliged the Romans to strengthen their own cavalry element, in particular by increasing the number of cataphracti.

The supposedly higher status of cavalry in the 4th century is also open to doubt. This view is largely based on underestimating the importance of cavalry in the 2nd century. Cavalry always had higher status than infantry in the Principate: in the time of Domitian (r. 81–96), auxiliary cavalry was paid 20–40% more than auxiliary infantry.

The view of some modern scholars that the 4th-century cavalry was a more efficient service than the infantry was certainly not shared by Ammianus and his contemporaries. Ammianus describes three major battles which were actually or nearly lost due to the incompetence or cowardice of the Roman cavalry. (1) The Battle of Strasbourg (357), where the cavalry, including cataphracts, were routed by their German counterparts at an early stage, leaving the Roman infantry right wing dangerously exposed. After fleeing behind the infantry lines, it took the personal intervention of Julian to rally them and persuade them to return to the fight. (The cataphracts were later ordered to wear female clothes by Julian as punishment). (2) During his Persian campaign (363), Julian was obliged to sanction two cavalry units for fleeing when caught by surprise attacks (one unit was decimated, the other dismounted). Later, the Tertiaci cavalry regiment was ordered to march with the camp followers for deserting the field just as the infantry was on the point of breaking the Persian line. (3) At the Battle of Adrianople (378), the Roman cavalry was largely responsible for the catastrophic defeat. Scholae units started the battle by an unauthorised attack on the enemy wagon circle, at a moment when their emperor Valens was still trying to negotiate a truce with the Goths. The attack failed, and when the Gothic cavalry appeared, the Roman cavalry fled, leaving the Roman infantry left wing exposed. The Gothic cavalry then routed the Roman left wing, and the battle was as good as lost.

In contrast, the excellent performance of the infantry, both comitatenses and limitanei, is a recurrent feature of Ammianus' history. At the Persian siege of Amida, Ammianus' eye-witness account describes the city's defence by limitanei units as skilful and tenacious, if ultimately unsuccessful. At Strasbourg (357), the infantry showed remarkable skill, discipline and resilience throughout, saving the day at two critical moments.(see Battle of Strasbourg for a detailed account). Even at the disaster of Adrianople, the Roman infantry fought on, despite being abandoned by their cavalry and surrounded on three sides by overwhelmingly superior numbers of Goths.

=== Tactics ===
Just as the armour and weapons of the late army were fundamentally similar to those of earlier eras, so the army's tactics were based on traditional principles. The key elements of systematic scouting, marching formation, battle array, fortified camping, and siegecraft were all followed intact in the late period. This section examines aspects of late tactics that differed significantly from tactics of the Principate.

One striking difference was that late army doctrine (and practice) aimed at avoiding open battle with the enemy if possible, unlike the early doctrine from the Principate of seeking to bring the enemy to battle as often and as quickly as possible. The main motivation was likely not a reduced ability to win such encounters. The late army continued to win the great majority of its battles with barbarians. Rather, the primary concern seemed to be the need to minimise casualties. Pitched battles generally resulted in heavy losses of high-grade comitatenses troops, which could not be easily replaced. This in turn supports the hypothesis that the late army had greater difficulty than the Principate in finding sufficient recruits, and especially high-quality recruits. The late army preferred to attack the enemy by stealth or stratagem: ambushes, surprise attacks, harassment and manoeuvres to corner the enemy in zones where they could not access supplies and from which they could not escape (e.g. by blocking mountain passes or river crossings).

Where battle could not be avoided, the late army broadly followed traditional practice as regards array. Heavy infantry would be drawn up in a main line, normally straight and several ranks deep. Mounted archers were stationed, together with light-armed slingers, in front of the main infantry line. Cavalry would be posted on the wings (light cavalry on the outside). Foot archers would form the rear rank(s) of the main infantry line. There would be a reserve line of infantry and cavalry of variable strength, to the rear of the main line, in order to deal with breaches in the main line and to exploit opportunities. At a distance of a mile or so to the rear of the army, its fortified camp of the previous night would contain its assistants and baggage, guarded by a small garrison. The camp could act as a refuge if the army was put to flight. Roman armies in the field never camped overnight without constructing defences. A ditch would be dug around the perimeter of the camp, and the spoil used to erect a rampart, which would then be topped with a palisade of sharpened wooden stakes arranged cross-hatched to form an impenetrable screen. Such defences, systematically patrolled, effectively precluded surprise attacks and enabled the troops to get a good night's sleep.

Where the late army appears to have evolved to some extent is in battle tactics. The older army of the Principate had relied on a barrage of heavy javelins (pila) followed by an infantry charge, which was often sufficient to shatter, or at least disorganise, the barbarian line. After that, legionaries were trained to engage in aggressive hand-to-hand combat, using the gladius short-sword to execute quick thrusts at the abdomen of their enemies, in a similar manner to more recent bayonet drill. In close combat, the Romans had the crucial advantage of superior armour, and such tactics very often resulted in the rout of the less well-equipped and trained barbarian foe. The mounted archers, and slingers on foot, in front of the main infantry line would loose their missiles on the enemy before the infantry lines engaged and then withdraw behind their own infantry line. Along with the foot archers already there, they would continue to rain arrows and sling projectiles on the enemy foot by shooting over the heads of their own infantry. The cavalry's task on each wing was to scatter the enemy cavalry facing them and then, if possible, to encircle the main body of enemy infantry and attack them from the flanks and rear.

In the late army, while the role of archers and cavalry remained similar, the infantry's tactics were less aggressive, relying less on the charge and often waiting for the enemy to charge. During the battle, the Roman line would exert steady pressure in close formation. The thrusting-spear (2–2.5 m long) had replaced the gladius (just 0.5 m (1 ft 8 in) long) as the primary mêlée weapon. The extended reach of the thrusting-spear, combined with the adoption of oval or round shields, permitted a battle array where shields were interlocked to form a "shield wall", with spears protruding through the V-shaped gaps formed between overlapping shields. The late army also relied more heavily on missiles, replacing the single volley of pila with a more prolonged discharge of javelins and darts.

This kind of combat was consistent with the aim of minimising casualties and its efficacy is illustrated by the Battle of Strasbourg. The battle was primarily a struggle of attrition where steady pressure on the barbarians resulted in their eventual rout. Despite a long and hard-fought struggle, Roman casualties were negligible in comparison to the losses sustained by the defeated army.

== The barbarisation theory ==
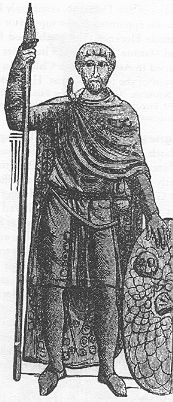
Drawing of Flavius Stilicho, the half-Vandal general who was magister utriusque militiae (commander-in-chief) of West Roman forces 395–408. The general is depicted without armour, wearing a chlamys (military cloak) over his tunic and carrying a heavy thrusting-spear and oval shield. He was made a scapegoat for the barbarian invasions of 405–6, although in reality his military skill may have saved the West from early collapse. Derived (1848) from an ivory diptych at Monza, Italy

The barbarisation theory, ultimately derived from Edward Gibbon's 18th-century magnum opus, The Decline and Fall of the Roman Empire, contains two propositions. (1) That the late army recruited much greater numbers of barbarian-born troops than the army of the Principate; and (2) that the greater number of barbarian recruits resulted in a major decline of the army's effectiveness and was a leading factor in the collapse of the Western Roman empire. As discussed above, proposition (1) is probably correct, although it should be borne in mind that probably about three-quarters of the late army's recruits remained Roman-born. This section considers proposition (2).

According to this view, the barbarian officers and men recruited by the late army, coming from tribes that were traditional enemies of Rome, had no real loyalty to Rome and often betrayed her interests, colluding with invading barbarian tribes, especially if those tribes were their own. At the same time, the spread of barbarian customs and culture led to a decline in traditional military discipline, and internal army disunity due to friction between Romans and barbarians. Ultimately, the army degenerated into just a collection of foreign mercenary bands that were incapable of defending the empire effectively.

According to the historian A.D. Lee, there is little evidence to support this view and compelling reasons to reject it. Firstly, the late army clearly was not, and did not become, ineffective. The regular army in the West remained a formidable force until the political disintegration of the West in mid-5th century and continued to win most of its major encounters with barbarian forces e.g. the defeat of Radagaisus in 405. In any case, the Eastern empire did not collapse, even though its army probably contained at least the same proportion of barbarians as the West, if not greater. An analysis of the ethnicity of Roman army officers named in the sources shows that in the period 350–99, 23% were probably barbarian-born. The same figure for period 449–76 officers, virtually all Easterners (as the Western army had largely dissolved) was 31%. In the Notitia, 55 Eastern regiments carry barbarian names, compared with 25 in the Western army.

There is a tendency by some modern scholars to ascribe to ancient barbarians a degree of ethnic solidarity that did not exist, according to A.H.M. Jones. Germanic tribes were constantly fighting each other and even within such tribal confederations as the Franks or Alamanni there were bitter feuds between the constituent tribes and clans. Indeed, a primary reason why many tribal sub-groups surrendered to the Roman authorities (dediticii) and sought to settle in the empire as laeti was in order to escape pressure from their neighbours. The few known conflicts of loyalty only arose when the Roman army was campaigning against a barbarian-born soldier's own specific clan. Ammianus himself never characterises barbarian-born troops as unreliable. On the contrary, his evidence is that barbarian soldiers were as loyal, and fought as hard, as Roman ones.

An indication of the army's high esteem for barbarian-born troops is that they appear to have been preferentially recruited to the elite units of the late imperial era's armies. In the auxilia palatina infantry regiments, the proportion of barbarians in the ranks appears to have numbered anywhere between a third and a half of effectives (compared to a quarter in the army as a whole). From the late 3rd century onwards, barbarian recruitment became crucial to the army's continued existence, by providing a much-needed source of first-rate recruits.

The former Oxford University historian Adrian Goldsworthy has argued that the cause of the fall of the Roman Empire in the West should not be blamed on barbarization of the late Roman Army, but on its recurrent civil wars, which seriously weakened its ability to repel or defeat invasions from outside its frontiers. The East Roman or Byzantine empire on the other hand had fewer civil wars to contend with in the years from 383-432 A.D.

== See also ==
- Battle of Strasbourg
- Historiography of the fall of the Western Roman Empire – article dealing with the Late Roman Empire
- Roman army
  - East Roman army
  - Structural history of the Roman military
- Military organization of the Germanic peoples
