= Primani =

Shield of the Primani, according to the Notitia Dignitatum.

The Primani was a legio palatina of the Late Roman army, active in the 4th and 5th century.

== History ==
They fought against the Alemanni under the Caesar Julian in the Battle of Strasbourg (357). They were deployed in the middle of the second line of the Roman formation, with three auxilia palatina units on their left and other three, among which Regii and Batavi, on their right. During the battle, the Roman first line broke under the pressure of the Alamannic infantry, which pushed on the Primani. The soldiers resisted and counter-attacked, causing the enemy to flee.

The Notitia Dignitatum, a document describing civil and military offices in the Western Roman Empire around 420 and in the Eastern Roman Empire in 395 circa, records the existence of the Primani iuniores under the command of the comes Britanniarum, therefore within the comitatus of the Magister peditum of Gaul, and that of the Primani under the army of the second magister militum praesentalis of the East.
