= Battle of Strasbourg =

Battle fought in AD 357

Coordinates: 48°34′25.7″N 7°45′07.8″E

- Part of the Roman–Alamanni conflict and Roman–Germanic Wars
Date	AD 357
Location	Near Strasbourg (modern-day Alsace, France)
Result	Roman victory

Belligerents
Western Roman Empire	Alamanni

Commanders and leaders
Julian; Severus (master of the cavalry)	Chnodomar (surrendered); Serapio

Strength
13,000	35,000

Casualties and losses
243	8,000
- Location of the battle within modern France

The Battle of Strasbourg, also known as the Battle of Argentoratum, was fought in 357 between the Western Roman army under Julian and the Alamanni tribal confederation led by the joint paramount King Chnodomar. The battle took place near Strasbourg, called Argentoratum in Ammianus Marcellinus' account, Argentorate in the Tabula Peutingeriana (section 2).

Although possibly outnumbered, the Roman army won a decisive victory after a hard-fought struggle with the Alamanni. With negligible casualties of their own, the Romans drove the Alamanni beyond the river, inflicting heavy losses. The Roman force, the imperial escort army of Julian, was small but of high quality. The battle was won by the skill of the Roman infantry, with the Roman cavalry initially performing poorly.

The battle was the climax of Julian's campaigns in 355–57 to evict barbarian marauders from Gaul and to restore the Roman defensive line of fortifications along the Rhine, which had been largely destroyed during the Roman civil war of 350–53. In the years following his victory at Strasbourg, Julian was able to repair and garrison the Rhine forts and impose tributary status on the Germanic tribes beyond the border.

== Sources ==
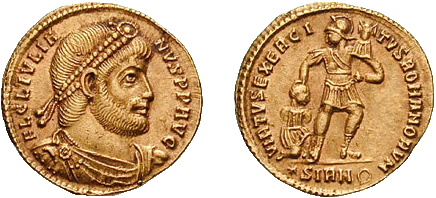
Coin showing (obverse) head of Julian (issued as emperor, 361-3) with diadem and (reverse) soldier bearing standard holding kneeling captive by the hair and legend VIRTUS EXERCITUS ROMANORUM ("Valour of the Roman army"). Gold solidus. Sirmium mint.

By far the most detailed and reliable source for the battle, and Julian's Gallic campaign (355–60) generally, is the Res Gestae (Histories) of Ammianus Marcellinus, a contemporary historian. Ammianus was a Greek career soldier who joined the army before 350 and served until at least 363. Enlisted as a protector (cadet senior officer), he served as a staff officer under magister equitum Ursicinus and then under Julian himself in the latter's Persian campaign. Although he was not present at Strasbourg, he had experience of the Gallic front as he was involved in the suppression of the revolt of Claudius Silvanus, the magister equitum (commander-in-chief) in Gaul (355). However, his narrative reveals a passionate admiration of Julian and occasionally descends to the level of eulogy. Furthermore, as he was writing some 40 years after the event, it is likely that Ammianus relied heavily, if not exclusively, on Julian's own memoir of the Strasbourg campaign (which we know he published, but has been lost). Thus Ammianus' account probably reflects Julian's own propaganda. In addition, Ammianus' account is of uneven quality, with many gaps and some contradictory elements.

The late 5th-century Byzantine chronicler Zosimus's Nova Historia deals with the battle, and Julian's Gallic campaign in a summary fashion and adds little to Ammianus' account. However, Zosimus is useful on two accounts. One is that his account of the revolt of Magnentius (350–3) survives, unlike Ammianus', which was covered in the 13 lost books of his history. The other is that for the reign of Julian we have on the authority of the Patriarch Photius that for this section of his history Zosimus is an epitomator of the account of Eunapius of Sardis, who drew upon the memoirs of Julian's physician Oribasius.

The contemporary rhetorician Libanius delivered Julian's funeral oration in 363, whose text survives. This contains some details about the battle which are missing in Ammianus, which he presumably learnt from members of Julian's entourage. But because his oration was intended as a eulogy, not a historical narrative, his account of Julian's campaign is unreliable, and Ammianus' version is to be preferred where there is a contradiction.

The emperor Julian himself published a memoir of his campaigns on the Rhine, now lost. His Letter to the Athenians, an attempt to justify his rebellion against his cousin and senior emperor Constantius II, contains some details of the Rhine campaigns.

== Alamanni ==
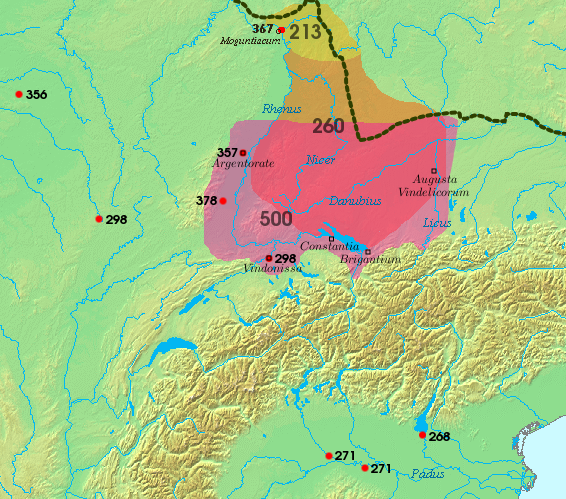
Map showing the extent of the territory of the Alamanni confederation at various points in time. Originating from the river Main region further North, the Alamanni tribes were in Julian's time established in the Agri Decumates (Black Forest) region (red shade). This had formerly been part of the Roman Germania Superior province, but was evacuated by the Romans in the mid-3rd century

During the 3rd century, the small and fragmented tribes of Germania Libera ("free Germany" i.e. Germany outside the empire) apparently coalesced into large, loose confederations: the Franks (NW Germany), Alamanni (SW Germany) and Burgundians (Central Germany). Although riven by internal feuding, these confederations could mobilise large forces and may have presented a greater threat to the empire than previously thought.

The Alamanni, who were originally from the Main valley of central Germany, had colonised the Agri Decumates (roughly the modern state of Baden-Württemberg in SW Germany) when the region was evacuated by the Romans in the mid-3rd century after belonging to the Roman province of Germania Superior for over 150 years. The Alamanni established a series of small pagi ("cantons"), mostly strung along the East bank of the Rhine (although a few were in the hinterland). The exact number and extent of these pagi is unclear and probably changed over time. Pagi, usually pairs of pagi combined, formed kingdoms (regna) which, it is generally believed, were permanent and hereditary.

The total Germanic population of Alamannia at this time has been estimated at a tiny 120,000 – 150,000. This compares with the about 10 million inhabitants of Roman Gaul. Alamanni society was a violent warrior-society based on feuding clans, a fine breeding-ground for good warriors.

At this time of Strasbourg, the Alamanni confederation appears to have been under the presidency of two paramount kings, Chnodomar and Westralp. Chnodomar was the driving force. A man of prodigious stature, strength and energy, he was nicknamed Gigas ("the Giant") by the Romans. He was a formidable sight in his "flashing" helmet (probably gold-leafed) and full parade armour. He is described by Ammianus as the "evil mastermind" behind the invasion of Gaul. Under the paramount king were 7 other kings (reges), including Vestralp, Urius, Ursicinus, Suomar and Hortar. It is possible that the petty kings (reguli) mentioned by Ammianus were the rulers of the pagi. Underneath the regal class were the nobles (called optimates by the Romans) and warriors (armati). The warriors consisted of professional warbands and levies of free men. Each nobleman could raise an average of about 50 warriors.

== Background: Barbarian invasion of Gaul ==
Northeastern Gaul and the Rhine frontier of the Roman Empire in the time of Julian

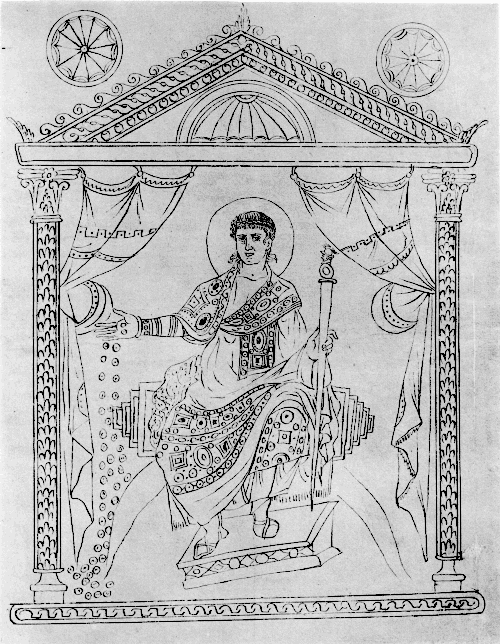
The emperor Constantius II (ruled 337–61), Julian's cousin and superior. One of the three sons and successors of Constantine I, he survived his two brothers to become sole emperor in 350. He is portrayed with a halo, as were most Christian emperors of the period. Portrait on a manuscript of the Chronography of 354, Rome

In January 350, the Roman empire was jointly ruled by two sons of Constantine, the Augusti (joint emperors) Constans, who ruled the West, and Constantius II in the East (the third brother, Constantine II, had been deposed and murdered by Constans' agents in 340).

But in that month, Constans was in his turn overthrown and killed by the usurper Magnentius, a laetus from Gaul who was comes (commander) of an elite brigade in Constans' comitatus (imperial escort army). In the East, Constantius had been engaged in a lengthy war against the Persians under Shah Shapur II (337–350). But he immediately concluded a truce in order to deal with Magnentius. He led his own comitatus to Illyricum where he assumed command of the local comitatus also, bringing his combined strike force to about 60,000. Magnentius gathered an army consisting of the Gaul comitatus (c. 25,000 men) and probably some Frankish and Saxon foederati (allies) and marched into Illyricum to confront Constantius. (For explanation of the term comitatus, see Late Roman army).

The Franks and Alamanni on the Rhine frontier now seized the opportunity presented by the absence of the best Roman forces in the civil war to overrun much of eastern Gaul and Raetia. Libanius claims that they were incited to do so by letters from Constantius, in order to create a diversion in Magnentius' rear. The barbarians captured many of the Roman forts along the Rhine, demolished their fortifications, and established permanent camps on the West bank of the river, which they used as bases to pillage Gaul during the four years that the civil war lasted (350–3). In excess of 20,000 Roman civilians were reported to have been abducted from Gaul and forced to work in the Alamanni's fields. In turn, this would have reinforced Alamanni raiding in Gaul by freeing many from the harvest cycle.

Meanwhile, a huge number of Rome's finest troops, including most of the Gaul comitatus and perhaps half the combined Eastern/Illyricum force, were wiped out in the civil war. At the Battle of Mursa in Pannonia (351), one of the bloodiest in Roman history, Magnentius lost an estimated 24,000 men (perhaps two-thirds of his army). Constantius' army, although victorious, suffered even greater casualties (about 30,000). A final encounter at the Battle of Mons Seleucus in the Alps saw further heavy casualties. Such massive losses of first-grade troops could not quickly or easily be replaced. Constantius, now based in Milan, was left with an escort army of about 30,000, but Illyricum and the East had been stripped of their comitatus. With renewed Persian attacks, the East was the top priority for reinforcement and Illyricum second. In the circumstances, Constantius could only spare in the region of 13,000 men for the Gaul comitatus, about half its previous strength. The Frankish-born general Silvanus was appointed its commander (magister equitum).

Using his own comitatus, Constantius succeeded in driving the Alamanni out of Raetia (354), and binding the kings of southern Alamannia, Vadomarius, and Gundomadus, with a treaty of alliance. Meanwhile, Silvanus made considerable progress in restoring the situation in Gaul. But the following year (355), Silvanus was driven by false accusations against him at the Imperial court into proclaiming himself emperor at Colonia (Cologne) and leading his men in a rebellion against Constantius. Constantius responded by dispatching to Cologne a flying-squad of protectores domestici (imperial staff-officers), including the future historian Ammianus himself, under the command of Ursicinus. These soon contrived to murder Silvanus and prevented a wider mutiny. But the shaken emperor decided that he needed a member of his own imperial dynasty (the House of Constantine, known to the Romans as the Flavii, after Constantine the Great's clan name) to share the burdens of governing the empire. This was a difficult decision for a paranoid ruler who regarded all his relatives with intense suspicion and had already put to death 2 of his uncles and 7 cousins, including Julian's half-brother Constantius Gallus. He appointed his cousin Julian as Caesar (deputy emperor) for the "Three Gauls" (the dioceses of Gaul, Spain, and Britain) and gave him overall command of forces in Gaul. The appointment, though greeted with enthusiasm by the troops at Milan, was more generally seen as unsuitable as Julian, who was just 23 years old, had no military experience and until that moment had spent his time studying philosophy at Athens. But Constantius' own family purges had left him little choice: Julian was his sole surviving adult male close relative.

The task confronting Julian as he took up his command was daunting. The civil war had left Gaul in a chaotic state. The defensive line of the Rhine had largely collapsed. According to Ammianus, Mogontiacum (Mainz), Borbetomagus (Worms), Nemetae Vangionum (Speyer), Tabernae (Saverne), Saliso (Seltz), and Argentorate (Strasbourg) were all in German hands. Apart from the major fortified city of Colonia Agrippina (Cologne), only three strongpoints on the Rhine remained in Roman hands: a single tower near Cologne and two forts, at Rigodunum (Remagen) and Confluentes (Koblenz). Large barbarian bands were roaming and pillaging northeastern Gaul at will, reaching as far as the River Seine. So many and so large were the marauding enemy bands that Silvanus was considered a brave man for having led a large force (8,000 men) along a wooded highway in the heart of Gaul because of the risk of ambush. Further, the Roman limitanei (border defence forces) along the Rhine had been decimated by the fall of most of their forts to the Germans, while those units that survived intact had mostly retreated from the frontier to garrison Gaul's cities. Cynics at Constantius' court in Milan whispered that Julian had been given an impossible mission to rid Constantius of a potential rival for the throne. In the event, however, he surprised everyone by proving an effective military leader.

== Prelude ==
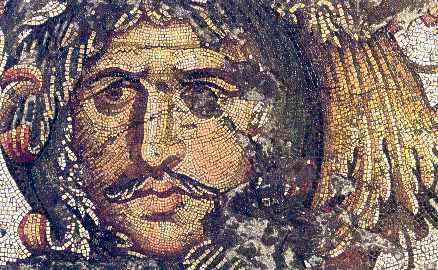
Portrait of a barbarian. Mosaic fragment from the Great Palace at Constantinople. 6th century

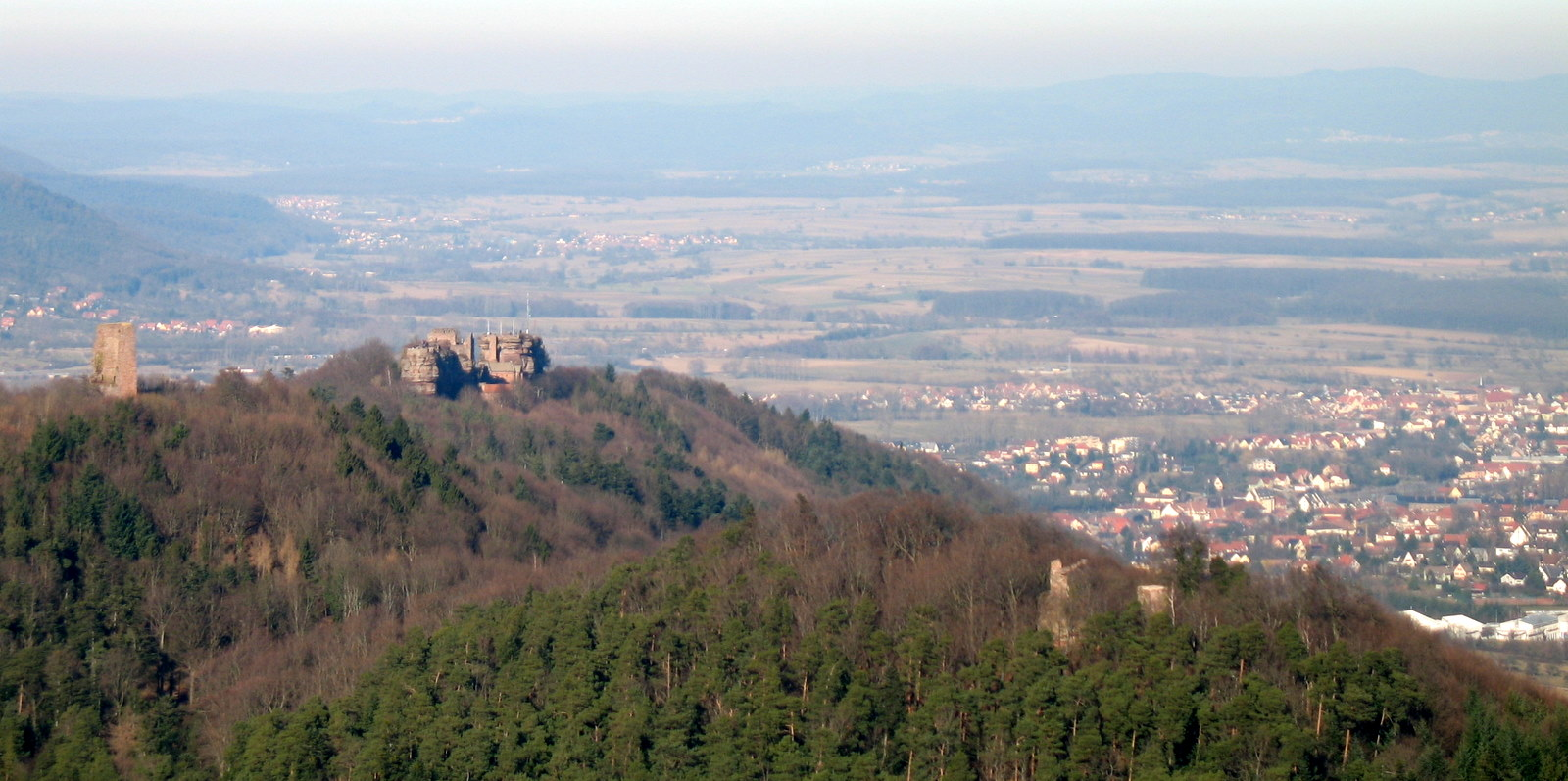
View of Saverne (town on right) from a foothill of the Vosges mountains. The hill contains the ruins of fortifications from various eras, including the medieval Chateau de Geroldseck (right). The town, known as Tres Tabernae ("Three Inns") to the Romans, lay astride the main Roman highway through the Vosges from Alsace into Gaul. Strasbourg lies some 30km off the right edge of the picture

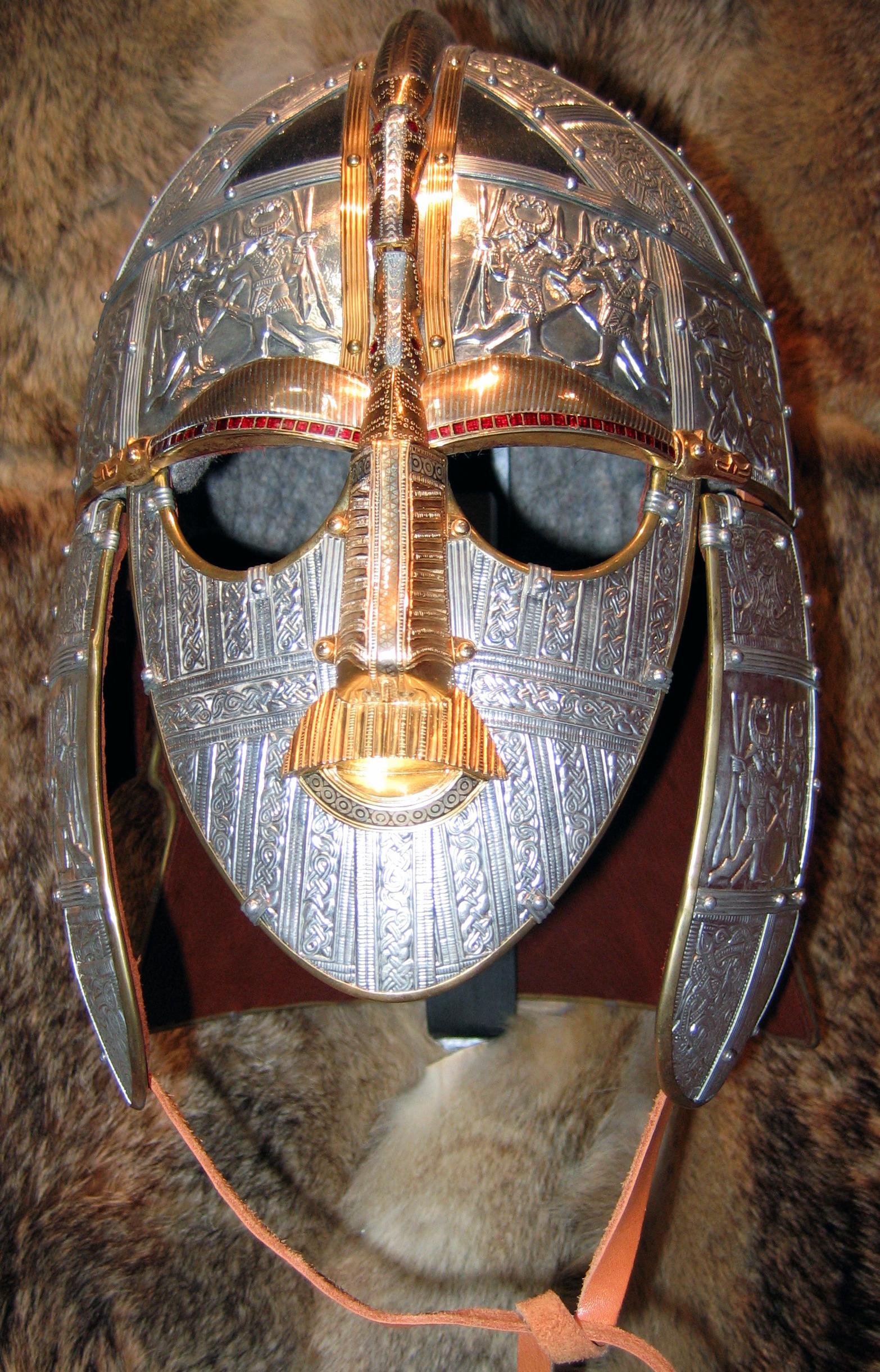
Reconstruction of the 7th-century parade helmet found in the Sutton Hoo Anglo-Saxon royal burial site. Based on a late Roman design known as a 'ridge-helmet', this type of helmet was commonly used by the Roman cavalry of the 4th to 6th centuries. This expensive, highly decorative version, designed for royalty, is likely similar to Chnodomar's "flashing helmet" described by Ammianus (XVI.12.24). Note the fake eyebrows, moustache and lips attached to the face-guard

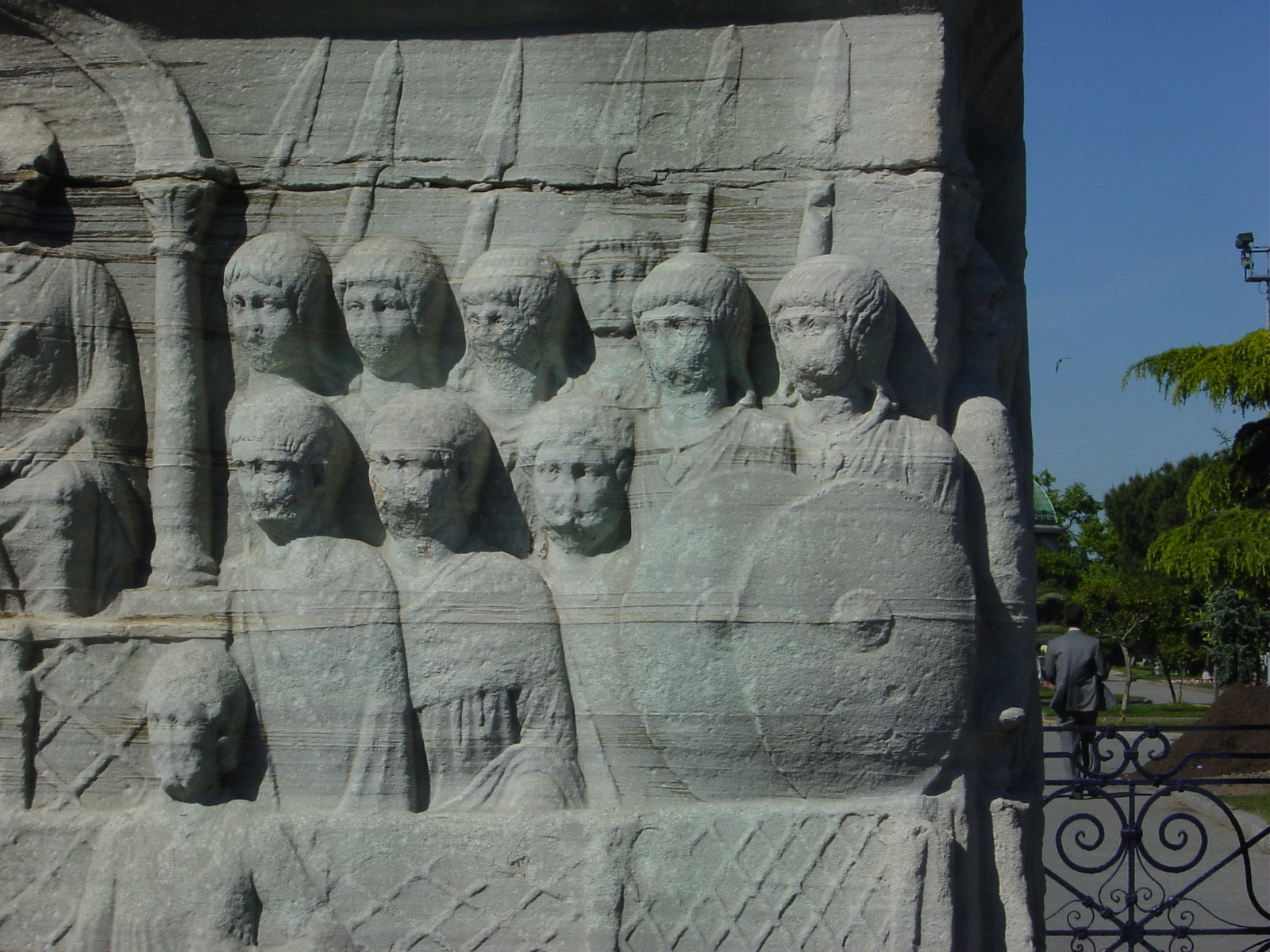
Late 4th-century Roman soldiers, mostly barbarian-born, as depicted (back row) by bas-relief on the base of Theodosius' obelisk in Constantinople. Note the necklaces with regimental pendants and the long hair, a style imported by barbarian recruits, in contrast to the short hair norm of the Principate

As a personal cavalry escort, Constantius provided Julian with 200 scholares, a regiment of cataphractarii (heavily armoured cavalry), and some mounted archers (in total 360 men). En route to Gaul from Milan, at Taurini (Turin), he received the calamitous news that Cologne, Rome's most important city and military fortress on the Rhine, had fallen to the Franks. He spent the winter of 355/356 with his escorting troops at Vienna (Vienne), not far south of Lugdunum (Lyons). For the 356 campaigning season, Julian's first task was to link up with the main Gaul comitatus, which had wintered at Remi (Reims) under the command of the magister equitum, Ursicinus' recently appointed successor, Marcellus. This involved a long march through country swarming with Alamanni raiding bands, many of which were as large or larger than Julian's own escort and expert at ambuscades. On the way, Julian surprised and drove off a large barbarian force that had surrounded Augustodunum (Autun) and defeated a raiding band in the Morvan wilderness.

At Reims, Julian showed his characteristic boldness by deciding, in conference with his senior commanders, to deal with the Alamanni problem at the source by marching straight to Alsace and restoring Roman control of the region. On the way, however, his army was ambushed and nearly destroyed at Decem Pagi (Dieuze) by a large German band who fell on two rearguard legions which had lost contact with the rest of the column in dense mist. They were rescued by auxilia palatina regiments that heard the uproar. Proceeding to Brocomagus (Brumath) in Alsace, Julian's army routed another German band in the field.

But after assessing the situation in Alsace, Julian evidently decided that his force was insufficient to prevail over the Alamanni alone. Instead, he set out to recover Cologne. From Metz, he led his army via Treviri (Trier) to Roman-held Koblenz and thence along the Rhine to Cologne. Entering the ruined city unopposed, Julian's men were set to work to rebuild the city walls. Julian then concluded a peace treaty with the Franks. This had the important result of removing half the opposition from the equation and allowing Julian to focus his resources on dealing with the Alamanni.

For the winter of 356/7, he chose Senones (Sens) near Paris as his own wintering base, but quartered most of his troops in other towns, including the main body at Reims under Marcellus, to spread the burden. A large band of Alamanni heard of his reduced escort, however, and besieged him at Sens. Julian's forces were able to hold out until, after a month, the Germans withdrew. He was so outnumbered by the enemy, however, that he was unable to sally forth and give chase. During the siege, Marcellus had failed to come to his assistance. For this omission, denounced as cowardice by Ammianus, Marcellus was dismissed as magister equitum by Constantius and replaced by Severus, a distinguished officer who was more compatible with Julian.

For the 357 campaign season, a plan was laid down at Constantius' headquarters in Mediolanum (Milan) to trap the Alamanni in eastern Gaul in a pincer movement. Julian would advance eastward from Reims, while the major part of Constantius' comitatus in Italy (25,000 strong) was despatched under magister peditum (field marshal) Barbatio to Augusta Rauracorum (Augst) in Raetia, from which he was to advance northward to meet Julian. The Alamanni bands would be cornered and destroyed in the southern part of Germania I province (Alsace).

But large bands of Alamanni, ignoring the threat posed by the Roman manoeuvre, invaded and ravaged the rich Rhone valley, even trying to take the major city of Lugdunum (Lyon) by assault. The attack was repulsed as the walls of the city proved too strong and the garrison, presumably limitanei troops, too valorous. Nevertheless, the Germans had devastated a large area and taken vast amounts of booty.

However, the Germans were now trapped in the interior of Gaul, as their return route to the Rhine was barred by the Roman armies. In Julian's sector, the Caesar despatched squadrons of cavalry to lie in ambush on three roads and these successfully intercepted and destroyed the returning barbarian bands. But in Barbatio's sector, the main body of Germans were allowed to pass unmolested: Barbatio's chief-of-staff Cella rejected the urgent plea of two of his cavalry tribuni (regimental commanders) Valentinianus (later Emperor Valentinian I ruled 364–75) and Bainobaudes to deploy their squadrons on a highway that they expected the enemy would use. The escaping force reached some islands in the Rhine near Strasbourg where the raiding bands had moved their camps for safety in response to the Roman pincer movement. Nevertheless, Julian pursued them vigorously. Although without boats, his men succeeded in reaching one island, as the river had become fordable at some points due to summer drought. An entire raiding band was surprised and slaughtered, a success repeated on a few other islands. In response, the Germans evacuated the remaining islands, removing their sutlers, baggage, and booty to the far side of the Rhine.

Julian now turned his attention to rebuilding the fortress at Tres Tabernae (Saverne), which had been destroyed by the Alamanni. Saverne lay astride the Mediomatrici (Metz) – Strasbourg Roman highway, at the mouth of the main entry route through the Vosges mountains into northern Alsace, a location with commanding heights overlooking the Rhine valley.

Meanwhile, probably in the vicinity of Strasbourg, the vanguard of Barbatio's army was ambushed by a strong German force as it approached the camp of Julian's deputy, Severus, who was apparently operating separately from Julian. The vanguard fled in disarray, and instead of engaging, Barbatio led the rest of his force in a hasty retreat, under close pursuit by the Germans, out of Alsace and a good way into Raetia, in the process losing most of his sutlers, pack animals, and baggage. Then Barbatio, whose cooperation with Julian had been reluctant at best, withdrew his army from the theatre of operations altogether, without Julian's permission. He sent his forces across the Alps into winter-quarters in Italy, despite it being the middle of the campaigning season and the Alamanni being far from defeated or ejected from Alsace. This reduced Roman forces in Alsace by two-thirds and effectively sabotaged the pincer strategy. It is unknown whether Constantius instigated Barbatio's actions, but it may seem unlikely that the magister would have risked breaking off operations unless confident of the emperor's approval. Ammianus, though himself doubtful, appears to attribute to the cowardice and malignity of Barbatio at least a part of his conduct.

Chnodomar could not ignore Julian's fortification of Saverne, as it threatened his control of Alsace and blocked his main access route into the interior of Gaul. He had come to see this region as Alamanni territory by right of conquest after occupying it for several years. He also claimed to possess letters from Constantius granting the Alamanni the right to occupy those lands. Chnodomar had been surprised and dismayed by Julian's successful campaigns of 355–7. But he was encouraged by his own success against Barbatio and the intelligence brought to him by a deserter that Barbatio's withdrawal had left the Caesar with only 13,000 men. Having driven two Roman magistri from the field (Barbatio and before him, Magnentius' lieutenant, Decentius), Chnodomar had lost the barbarians' traditional fear of pitched battles with the Romans.

The Alamanni high kings now ordered a mass mobilisation of all the confederation's member tribes, gathering their bands at Strasbourg. In addition, they received the timely support of the Alamanni cantons near Raetia that had been pacified by Constantius in 355. Their leaders were overthrown in an anti-Roman coup by their optimates. Gundomad was slain and Wadomar forced at sword-point to break his treaty and lead his warriors to join Chnodomar. Finally, they summoned the assistance of certain non-Alamanni tribes (probably Burgundians), partly for services rendered in the past, partly for payment. At Strasbourg on the Rhine (about 32 km SE of Saverne), they gathered a combined force of some 35,000 men, according to Ammianus. This figure may be an exaggeration, but the exceptional size of the levy is shown by the presence of all the Alamanni kings and the report of a captured scout that the Germans took three entire days in crossing the Rhine by the bridge at Strasbourg. Their aim was to bring Julian to battle and crush him by sheer weight of numbers. They provoked Julian by sending him an ultimatum to evacuate Alsace immediately.

Julian was now faced with a finely balanced judgement call. The safer option was to ignore Chnodomar's challenge and to keep his forces in their fortified bases and request and await reinforcements, if necessary until the following year's campaign season. But the performance of Barbatio and the imperial comitatus in the recent campaign cast doubt on whether such reinforcements would be supplied and on their value if they were. Such a course would also expose Gaul to a massive Germanic invasion just when the harvest was due. Alternatively, he could fight Chnodomar alone. The army itself was clamorous for instant action, and the refusal would dampen morale as well as inciting sedition, a danger never far from the mind of a Roman general. A combat at this juncture offered the prospect of a decisive victory, since the Alamanni forces were for once concentrated and not divided into many disparate bands. This argument was strongly made by Florentius, the praefectus praetorio Galliarum (governor-general of Gaul), who had the crucial job of ensuring the army's recruits, pay and supplies. The Romans almost always won pitched battles with barbarians, because of their superior equipment, organisation, and training. But in this case it was clearly a high-risk option because of the Germans' massive superiority in numbers.

Julian decided to confront the Alamanni with just the forces at his disposal.

== Roman order of battle ==
The composition of Julian's army at Strasbourg can only be partially reconstructed. Ammianus gives the names of only five regiments in his account of the battle itself. But at other points of Ammianus' narrative of Julian's campaigns in Gaul, and also in Zosimus' history, there are mentions of other regiments in his comitatus, which were very likely at Strasbourg also.

A comitatus at this time probably contained only three types of regiment, all of them of the top, palatini, grade: cavalry vexillationes and infantry legiones and auxilia. There is much uncertainty about the size of late Roman army units. The official strength of vexillationes and legiones seems to have been 800 and 1,200 respectively. But actual strengths recorded were 400 and 800 respectively. A midpoint between these figures is assumed here of 500 for vexillationes and 1,000 for legiones palatinae. The strength of the auxilia palatina regiments is disputed. They may have been as large as legions, or only half the size. Half the size is more likely, as it accords best with the available evidence. Also, if an auxilium was the same size as a legion, there would seem little purpose in the distinction between the two types of unit.

The sources give the following units for Julian's comitatus:

Units attested in Julian's comitatus, 355-60 Asterisk indicates unit specified by Ammianus at Strasbourg
Infantry Legiones (1,000-strong)	Infantry Auxilia palatina (500-strong)	Cavalry Vexillationes (500-strong)
Ioviani; Herculiani; Primani*; Moesiaci (1); Moesiaci (2)	Batavi*; Reges*; Cornuti*; Brachiati*; Celtae; Heruli; Petulantes	Normal; Equites Gentiles; Equites scutarii* Heavy; Equites cataphractarii (1)*; Equites cataphractarii (2)*; Light; Equites Dalmatae; Equites sagittarii*
Total (inf) 5,000	Total (inf) 3,500	Total (cav) 3,000

The Ioviani and Herculiani legions and equites Dalmatae are not mentioned by the sources as under Julian, but as part of the Gaul comitatus of usurper Magnentius. They are likely to have been inherited by Julian. If all these units were present at Strasbourg, the infantry total is 1,500 short, or 3,500 if Severus commanded an extra 2,000 men. Probably the names of a number of auxilia regiments (and possibly a legion) are missing in our sources. If so, at least one of these units is likely to be a sagittarii (archer) unit, as a comitatus would be incomplete without archer capacity. Overall, the most likely scenario is that Julian's force at Strasbourg consisted of 5–6 legiones and 10–14 auxilia of infantry and 6 vexillationes of cavalry.

As regards cavalry, Ammianus mentions only cataphracti in his account of the battle. But it is virtually certain that they were only part of his force. In the late army as a whole, only 15% of cavalry regiments were heavily armoured cataphracti. These were suitable for the shock charge. Two tribuni (regimental commanders) of cataphracts were reported killed at Strasbourg. There were thus at least two vexillationes of cataphracts (1,000 horse) engaged. Elsewhere in Ammianus and Zosimus it is stated that Julian had a regiment of Gentiles and a regiment of scutarii under his command. Both these were normal (semi-armoured) units that represented the majority (61%) of the late army's cavalry and were best suited to mêlée combat. There is also mention of light (unarmoured) units of equites Dalmatae (javelineers) and equites sagittarii (mounted archers). Light cavalry was used for harassment and pursuit. The likeliest scenario is that all these were present at Strasbourg, with two vexillationes each of heavy, normal and light cavalry engaged. It is thus likely that cataphracts were about a third of Julian's cavalry at Strasbourg, an unusually high proportion. In addition, Julian had his personal escort of 200 picked cavalry. These were probably a detachment from one of Constantius' scholae (elite cavalry squadrons, believed 500-strong, that served as the imperial horse guard).

As regards the line of battle, we are given a little information by Ammianus. He reports that the right flanks of each line, front and reserve, were held by two auxilia regiments and the centre of the reserve line was held by the Primani legion. A possible order of battle that fits the available evidence is shown in the diagram of the battle.

== Adversaries compared ==
=== Romans ===
According to Ammianus, a deserter informed Chnodomar that Julian had 13,000 men with him at Saverne. But this leaves open the possibility that he may have summoned more to join him for the battle. It is possible that Severus' division was additional, as it is stated that while Julian was at Saverne, Severus' men occupied a separate camp near Barbatio's army. Libanius implies that Julian had 15,000 men under his command. If this was true, the additional 2,000 may have been Severus' division. Also, Julian may have been able to call on some limitanei units to join his comitatus for the campaign. Zosimus states that on arrival in Gaul, Julian set about a major recruitment drive. This would mainly have aimed at reconstituting limitanei regiments that had largely dissolved during the years of anarchy. Julian's force may therefore have numbered somewhat more than 15,000.

Julian's comitatus, although only half its normal size, was of high quality, containing some of the best regiments in the Late Roman army, with an awesome combat reputation. All were palatini (top-grade regiments). A substantial proportion of his troops were of barbarian, mostly Germanic, birth. An analysis of known names of officers and men in the auxilia palatina infantry regiments suggests that anywhere between 33% and 50% of the effectives were barbarian-born (the Roman-born troops were mostly Gallo-Romans). Of the German-born recruits, many would probably have been Alamanni. There is little evidence that this affected their loyalty. On the contrary, the history of Julian's Gallic campaign shows that his barbarian troops were fiercely loyal and reliable. It is true that there were a few isolated cases of Germanic deserters who defected to the enemy, but these were mostly motivated by personal reasons, not by ethnic solidarity. The only recorded instance of the latter was an officer who allegedly alerted members of his own tribe that Julian was planning a campaign against them. In the vast majority of cases, it is clear that regimental loyalties prevailed over ethnic ones. This is evidenced by the fierce alacrity of Julian's troops to engage with the enemy and the determination with which they fought the battle (3 of the 4 tribuni killed at Strasbourg had barbarian names). Regarding training, the Roman troops were career professionals, constantly drilled in formation manoeuvres and combat techniques. Their most important advantage in a pitched battle was formation drill: the ability to hold one's position in a unit at regular intervals, and to replace fallen comrades, so that a unit maintains its shape and coherence as it moves or engages.

The cavalry element of Julian's force has been estimated at 3,000 (6 vexillationes – squadrons — of about 500 men each). This amounts to some 20% of the total force, a proportion in line with the late Roman army as a whole. The Roman cavalry was clearly superior to Chnodomar's in armour and training, as well as specialisation. The Romans deployed not only light, unarmoured cavalry like the Germans', but also semi-armoured (with mail cuirass) and heavily armoured cavalry. The light cavalry consisted of one regiment of equites Dalmatae, a class of javelineers that appears to have been introduced only in the 3rd century, and one of mounted archers (equites sagittarii). These were fast, manoeuvrable horse who specialised in harassing attacks, pursuit and ambush. The heavily armoured horse were called cataphractarii or clibanarii (these terms were probably interchangeable and did not indicate any significant difference in equipment). These were covered neck to toe in scale and/or lamellar articulated armour and were armed with a contus, a long heavy lance, as well as a sword. Since Ammianus implies at least two cataphractarii regiments, they probably constituted about a third of the Roman cavalry (1,000).

On the Roman side, Ammianus attests one vexillatio of equites sagittarii (mounted archers) at Strasbourg. It is also likely that at least one regiment of foot archers took part, probably an auxilium of sagittarii (archers). There were thus probably about 1,000 archers in dedicated units on the Roman side. In addition, a number of ordinary infantry units probably included archers.

=== Alamanni ===
Ammianus puts the Alamanni force at around 35,000. This is consistent with two other figures he gives for Alamannic armies elsewhere in his history: an army of 40,000 in 378; and in 366 an army divided in three, with one division 10,000 strong. Nevertheless, several historians regard Ammianus' figure as unrealistically high. It has been recently suggested that in reality the Alamanni at Strasbourg may have been only about 15,000, much the same as the Romans. This calculation is based on the assumption that the average reported size of Alamanni raiding-bands (800 men) represented the maximum manpower of a pagus. For various reasons, the midpoint figure between these two extremes (about 25,000 men) appears the most likely scenario. (Note: Alamanni numbers: A maximum of 800 warriors per pagus seems low in the context of the overall population estimate for Alamannia, which, if divided by about 20 pagi, works out at 6,000 – 7,500 persons, or 1,200 – 1,500 warriors per pagus (if one assumes that a conservative 20% of the population were active warriors). Taking the midpoint of 1,350 warriors gives a maximum of 27,000 warriors. However, it is unrealistic that all would have been present at Strasbourg, as it would leave no one behind to guard their home pagi or to allow for sickness, absence or dissidence. Even in the context of the full levy apparently ordered by the Alamanni high kings, it seems likely that about a third would have been absent, leaving around 18,000 in the field. To these, however, should be added the non-Alamanni allies, whose number is unknown, but are assumed at about 5,000 by Drinkwater. This would put Chnodomar's total effectives at about 23,000.)

Another possible indicator of Chnodomar's numbers is size of forces considered necessary by the Roman government to deal with the Alamanni threat in Gaul: 40,000 (Julian's 15,000 plus Barbatio's 25,000). Assuming that the Roman military planners would have sought a 2 to 1 superiority to guarantee success, that would imply an Alamannic strength in Alsace of about 20,000. On the basis of these indicators, the midpoint between the recent estimate and Ammianus' figure, 25,000, would seem plausible.

Mention should also be made of 19th-century German historian Hans Delbrück's claim that it was the Alamanni who were heavily outnumbered at Strasbourg, having only 6,000 – 10,000 men. But this view finds no support in the available evidence:

1. 6,000 Alamanni were counted dead in the field, a figure likely to be accurate, given the Roman custom of counting enemy dead after a battle. In addition, a substantial number drowned trying to escape across the Rhine (about 2,000, if Libanius' figure of 8,000 Alamanni dead is accurate). Thus, if Delbrück's estimate is correct, virtually every Alamannus was killed, which appears unlikely: all the Alamanni kings (and by extension their retinues) save Chnodomar succeeded in escaping.
2. Ammianus' narrative makes clear that Chnodomar ordered an unusually strong levy. Hence the presence at Strasbourg of all eight contemporary Alamanni kings and of the non-Alamanni allies.
3. Chnodomar was highly unlikely to have risked a pitched battle against the Romans with an inferior force. Indeed, against a commander he knew to be capable, he would most likely have required a substantial numerical advantage. In this case, the Romans were outnumbered by around 1.5 to 1 rather than the 3 to 1 that Ammianus implies.

Chnodomar's men were of much less even quality than Julian's. His best warriors were the professional retinues of the regales (royal class, called ring-givers by the Germans), organized in warbands. They were well equipped with armour and swords, as behove their masters' status. The majority of his men, however, were temporary levies, lightly equipped and often inexperienced, like most contemporary Germanic forces relying on light equipment and speed. On the Alamanni side, there is little evidence of formation manoeuvres. The professional retainers of the regales may have had some capacity for this, especially as Germanic armies were by now very familiar with the Roman way of war. Ammianus' account mentions a globus (mass) of the best warriors coming together in the thick of the battle and breaking through the Roman line. In addition, several would likely have served in the Roman army in the past. But the majority of Chnodomar's men consisted of temporary levies, whose equipment and experience would have been limited. According to Ammianus, they had to rely on a concentrated frontal charge to try to break through by weight of numbers, and proved no match for the Romans in the final phase of the battle, a prolonged struggle of attrition at close-quarters.

The size of Chnodomar's cavalry is unknown, but was probably a small proportion of the total, as the Alamanni's heavily forested land was not suited to large-scale cavalry operations. Most of the Alamanni horsemen were noblemen and their retainers, as only they could afford to keep a warhorse. Chnodomar's cavalry is unlikely to have exceeded 1,750 horse in total, assuming that the cavalry element was similar to the 7% cavalry element in the early Roman citizen legion, as the latter was also recruited exclusively from the wealthiest classes.

Ammianus is silent about archers on the Alamanni side. The Germans almost certainly did not have mounted archers, as this was an arm that evolved in the East and in any case, their longbows are unsuitable for use on horseback. As for the infantry, the archery capability of the Rhine Germans has traditionally been seen as negligible, due to the 6th-century writer Agathias's comment that the Franks did not know how to use bows. But this is contradicted by the archaeological record and by Ammianus himself in other parts of his account. Yew longbows had been used in Northern Europe for centuries; it is believed that they became widespread in Germania libera in the 4th century.

=== Equipment ===
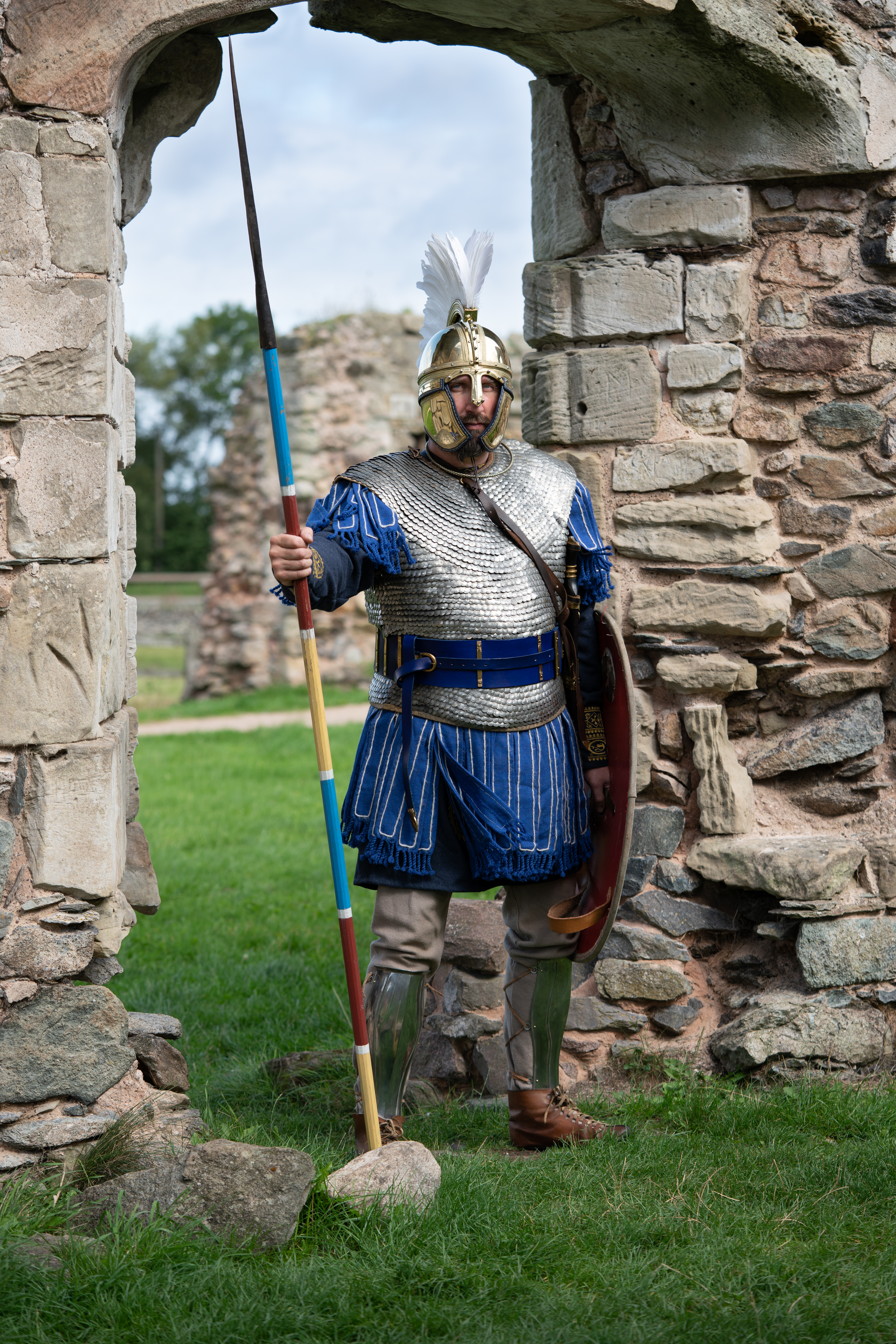
Re-enactor from Magister Militum re-enactment group wearing the typical equipment of a 4th century Roman soldier, representing an officer of the ioviani seniores as they would have appeared at the time of the Battle of Strasbourg. Note the thick, decorative belt identifying state or military employment. His armour is made of tinned scales (scale armour) and he carries a round shield, usually the mark of a light skirmisher or officer (regular infantry carrying oval versions), and the decorative fabric strips (pteruges) underneath his armour further solidifing his status. He also bears a ridge helmet, in this case equipped with a feather crest to denote a soldier of import, a design likely adopted from Persian examples of the 3rd century to replace the spun-bowl helms of the earlier period. He carries a thrusting spear and a long, decorative sword for close-combat.

Roman military equipment was mass-produced in state-run fabricae ("factories") which brought together advanced forging technology and skilled artisans. Roman weapons were mostly made of steel such as chalybs Noricus which was superior to unhardened iron. In Germania libera, forging technology, capacity and personnel were more limited, although there is evidence that production and standardization of equipment had greatly improved since the time of the Roman Principate. Steel-making was also known in Germania libera (spathae and rapier-like swords out of flexible steel were in use). But Alamanni production of sophisticated forge-products such as metal armour, helmets and swords was on a much smaller scale than the Romans'. Simple weapons such as axes and knives seem often to have been made of unhardened iron. Overall, the 4th-century Roman soldier's equipment was superior to his enemy's, though probably not by the same margin as in earlier centuries.

For personal protection, most Roman troops wore metal body armour (usually in the form a mail cuirass) and helmets, in addition to shields. In contrast, among the Alamanni, metal armour and helmets were probably owned by members of the social elite only. Most Alamanni foot soldiers had only shields and no metal armour or helmets.

For hand weapons, most Roman foot carried a thrusting-spear (hasta) and a sword (spatha). Among the Alamanni, spears were the universal weapon; swords were probably less common. Nobles (optimates) and the professional warrior-retainers of ringgivers certainly had them. For the lower ranks the position is not certain. Ammianus' report on the battle implies that many in the Alamanni ranks carried swords. Those that did not were armed with a seax (long pointed Germanic knives with some types being shortswords) as well as a spear and/or battle axe.

For short-range missile (throwing) weapons, a Roman infantryman would probably had either a long throwing-spear or two or three short javelins (lanceae) and half a dozen plumbatae (weighted darts) with an effective range of about 30m. Ammianus talks of a variety of missiles being thrown by the Alamanni in the battle: spicula (a kind of long pilum-type javelin, also known as an angon), verruta missilia (short throwing-spears) and ferratae arundines (probably darts and franciscas: throwing-axes). Overall, there appears little difference in the throwing-missile capability of the contenders. Ammianus indicates that the Roman infantry ranks were obliged to hold their shields above their heads for much of the time due to the volume of missiles raining down on them.

The standard Roman bow was the recurved composite bow, a relatively compact but powerful weapon. Foot archers normally formed the rear rank of the Roman battle-line, shooting over the heads of their own infantry, whilst protected by it from the enemy.

== Battle ==
=== Advance to battlefield ===
The campaigning season was by now well-advanced, as Julian had spent a considerable time restoring Saverne. But it was still summer, as the weather was hot and wheat was ripe in the fields. It was therefore probably August.

Reconstructing a timetable for the day of the battle is tentative due to ambiguous statements in Ammianus (which may have been caused by manuscript copying-errors). It appears that Julian's army set forth at dawn, and apparently arrived within sight of the barbarian entrenchments (vallum) outside Strasbourg at around midday, after a march of 21 Roman miles. (A contradictory statement in Julian's speech implies that the army was still far from its destination and faced a night march to reach it. But this is incompatible with all the other available data and should thus probably be disregarded). The starting-point was probably Saverne, since this is the last stated location of Julian's army, and it lay a consistent distance from Strasbourg on the Roman highway.

Ammianus reports that at the end of the march, Julian gave a speech to the assembled army. This speech, in which Julian, concerned that his men might be too tired to fight after a 6-hour march in the hot sun, urged that the clash be postponed until the following day. But his officers and men would have none of it and clamoured to be led against the enemy immediately. Julian, who prided himself on acting by consensus, gave way. However, this is a rhetorical convention used by many ancient historians, and trusting Ammianus too far, has misled later historians such as Edward Gibbon. Since Ammianus reports the battle and subsequent pursuit ended after sunset, it seems unlikely that the army would have actually engaged at midday straight after the march without a few hours rest and refreshment (and, if a camp was built, a couple of hours spent on that task). It thus seems likely that battle commenced in the late afternoon.

Chnodomar, alerted by his lookouts that the Roman army was at hand, moved his army forward from its base before the ruined walls of Strasbourg to his chosen battlefield nearby. The battlefield was a gently-sloping hill a few miles from the Rhine, partly fields with ripe wheat. Libanius claims that on one side was an "elevated water course" (presumably an aqueduct or canal), built over a swamp. But this seems incompatible with Ammianus' statement that the battle took place on higher ground (as water could hardly flow uphill), and may be a garbled detail from another of Julian's battles. One leading theory is that the battle took place near the village of Oberhausbergen 3 km NW of Strasbourg. The western edge of the battle field was defined by the Metz-Strasbourg Roman highway, on the far side of which was broken, wooded ground impassable to cavalry.

=== Lines of battle ===
Reconstructed initial order of battle at Strasbourg. On the Roman side, legions hold the centre, auxilia the wings. Note Julian's position, with his 200-strong cavalry escort (probably scholares), between the two Roman lines and Severus' separate division on the left wing. (The Roman line-up is based on a 15,000-strong force). On the German side, troops are drawn up in contingents from each pagus, with each pair of pagus contingents under a king. Note the infantry hidden in the wooded area (left) and interspersed among the cavalry (right)

The German host was waiting for the Romans, probably drawn up on the crest of the hill, to give Chnodomar's men the advantage of the slope. The German left wing was held by Chnodomar and his cavalry. Demonstrating that he was well aware of the threat posed by the Roman heavy cavalry, Chnodomar had devised a stratagem. He interspersed lightly armed infantry among his cavalry. These were easy to conceal in the standing grain. The idea was that in a mêlée, the foot soldiers would bring down the cataphracts by crawling along the ground and stabbing their horses in their underbellies, which were unprotected. The dismounted riders, weighed down by their armour, could then easily be despatched on the ground. The German right wing blocked the highway to Strasbourg, while in the woods beyond the highway were a substantial force of warriors hidden in ambush on Chnodomar's orders. The right wing was under his nephew Serapio (who was given his Greek name by his Hellenophile father). Although still a teenager, Serapio had already proved a military leader worthy of his uncle. The rest of the line was probably divided into pagi units under five major kings and ten petty kings.

Julian drew up his infantry in two lines, widely spaced apart, each several ranks deep. This was a standard Roman line-up: the rear line troops were reserves who would be able to intervene if the enemy threatened to break through at any point, and to exploit opportunities as they arose. During the battle, the foot archers (sagittarii) would have formed the rear rank of the front line, to shoot over the heads of their own infantry. But at the start, archers were sometimes stationed in front of the main line, so that they could disrupt the enemy ranks with their missiles. This was especially likely if the Romans' archer forces were much stronger than Chnodomar's, giving them a competitive advantage in a long-range missile exchange. But Ammianus does not state if this happened on this occasion. On the right wing was posted the entire cavalry. Most likely, the light cavalry would have been stationed in front, to harass the enemy before the heavy cavalry launched their shock charge. Set back from the left flank of the front line, Julian posted a separate division under Severus to face the woods beyond the highway, apparently with orders to advance into them, presumably to launch a surprise attack on the German right wing. Julian himself, with his escort of 200 scholares, probably took up position in the gap between the Roman lines, giving him a close, but relatively protected, view of the action.

Julian's best hope for a quick victory lay in a cavalry breakthrough. Not only was the German cavalry probably smaller than his own, but its lack of armour made it vulnerable to his armoured regiments, especially the cataphracts. If they could rout the enemy horse, his squadrons could then wheel around and attack the German lines in the flank or rear, and the battle would be as good as won. Julian's cavalry would thus aim to deliver a shock charge, careering forward in a wedge formation with the cataphracts forming the spearhead, the conventional armoured cavalry on either side and the light regiments on the extreme right, ready to block outflankers and to pursue fleeing enemy horse. The initial collision would shatter the enemy formation, and then the Germans could be overpowered in the ensuing melee. Failing a cavalry breakthrough, Julian would have to rely on a struggle of attrition on foot, in which superior Roman armour, training, and formation discipline would almost inevitably prevail.

=== Engagement ===
As soon as the two armies were drawn up, a clamour arose from the German ranks, loudly demanding that Chnodomar and his entourage of chiefs should dismount and lead the main body of German foot warriors from the front. Chnodomar and the chiefs immediately complied. In so doing, Chnodomar forfeited any strategic control of the battle, as, trapped in the centre of the action, he would have no way of knowing what was happening in other sectors. Julian, on the other hand, maintained a detached position throughout (with his escort) and so was able to respond to events all over the field, such as the initial rout of his cavalry. It is unclear exactly where Julian was stationed but it was likely in the gap between the two Roman lines.

The Roman main charge would likely have been preceded by harassing attacks by the light cavalry. The mounted archers would execute what the Romans knew as the "Parthian attack": ride up to within range of the enemy, loose a volley of arrows, then hastily retreat, using the arrow distance to escape pursuit. This could be repeated several times, causing significant casualties and, ideally, enticing the enemy into a premature and disorganised charge. However, in this case, the German cavalry would have been prevented from charging as their interspersed infantry support would not have been able to keep up—most likely, they awaited the Roman cavalry at the halt, or moved forward slowly.

The Roman heavy cavalry now charged the German horsemen. In the ensuing mêlée, Chnodomar's stratagem paid dividends. The interspersed foot warriors wreaked havoc, bringing down the horses of the cataphracts and then killing their riders on the ground. Unnerved by these tactics, and by the injury of one of their tribuni, the cataphracts panicked and fled the field. In their headlong flight, they crashed into the Roman infantry on the right, which, however, was able to maintain formation because of the skill of the crack auxilia palatina regiments Cornuti and Brachiati posted there. The cataphracts took refuge behind the infantry lines, where it took the personal intervention of Julian himself to rally them. Zosimus claims that one regiment of cataphracts refused to return to the fight and that after the battle, they were obliged by Julian to wear female clothes as punishment. (Note: Roman military discipline. This light sanction for an offence that would by Roman tradition warrant decimation, was probably due to Julian's severe shortage of troops, and certainly not because Julian was a lenient commander: as emperor 6 years later he had another cavalry regiment decimated for cowardice during his Persian campaign.) The performance of the rest of the cavalry is not described by Ammianus, but they would have been obliged to retreat with the cataphracts, though it is unclear whether they followed them to behind the infantry lines, or, more likely, halted to cover the Roman right wing. It is clear, however, that the German cavalry was unable to capitalise on their success to outflank the Roman right. Nevertheless, Chnodomar had trumped Julian's best card.

Encouraged by their cavalry's success, the foot soldiers in the German front line gave a great roar and ran towards the Roman line, which was formed as a barrier of interlocking shields. In the centre, German foot warriors repeatedly charged the Roman shieldwall, hoping to break through by sheer weight of numbers and brute strength. But the serried ranks of the Roman front, shields massed together “as in a testudo” held them off for a long time, inflicting severe casualties on the Germans who flung themselves recklessly at their bristling spears. Then, a group of German chiefs and their best warriors formed a dense mass (globus), and, let through by the German front ranks, charged the Romans. This was probably a formation, also used by the Romans, known as a "hogshead" (caput porcinum), a wedge protected by armoured warriors on the outside. They succeeded, by desperate efforts, in punching a hole through the centre of the Roman front line. This was potentially disastrous for the Romans. But despite being cut in two, the Roman front line evidently did not collapse: the experienced frontline regiments managed to hold their separated wings in formation.

In the meantime, on the Roman left wing, Severus must have suspected the prepared ambush, and held back from advancing into the woods, according to Ammianus. Libanius contradicts this, claiming that the Romans charged the enemy and flushed them out of their hiding places. But Ammianus' version is more likely, as the Romans would hardly have benefited from advancing straight into a prepared trap. Ammianus does not report further action in this sector. But it is likely that the hidden Germans eventually lost patience, advanced out of the woods and charged at Severus' division, only to be routed by Severus' crack troops.

Meanwhile, a large number of Germans poured through the breach in the Roman frontline and charged the centre of the Roman rear line. This position was held by the elite Primani legion, with the Batavian cohorts, which stopped the German attack in its tracks and then counterattacked, routing the breakthrough force. The breach in the front line was presumably filled, either by the separated wings of the front line reconnecting, or by the Primani advancing from the rear line (Ammianus does not specify which). The front line, now extended on the left flank by the rear line left wing, (and presumably by Severus' victorious division), began pushing the Germans back, and gradually hemmed them in from the flanks. At this point, the Germans were already exhausted and demoralised by their lack of progress and severe losses. The mass of their army was now trapped in an ever-tighter Roman crescent, with the troops on the edges being methodically cut down and the ones in the middle packed tightly together and unable to move. Finally, after more relentless pressure from the Romans, the German line collapsed: as panic spread through their ranks, the Germans broke formation and ran for their lives. Many did not run fast enough: pursued all the way to the Rhine by Roman cavalry and infantry, many were cut down as they ran. Large numbers attempted to swim across the river, but many drowned, hit by Roman missiles or weighed down by their armour.

Ammianus reports that 6,000 Germans perished on the battlefield and in the pursuit on land. (Libanius gives a figure of 8,000). Thousands more drowned as they tried to get across the river. It is thus likely that about a third of the German force lost their lives. However, it appears that the majority escaped, including the eight reges alongside Chnodomar. The Romans lost just 243 men, including four tribuni (regimental commanders) of which two were commanders of cataphracti.

Chnodomar himself and his retinue tried to escape on horseback, hoping to reach some boats prepared for just such an emergency near the ruined Roman fort of Concordia (Lauterbourg), some 40 km downstream from Strasbourg. But they were cornered by a Roman cavalry squadron in a wood on the bank of the Rhine and surrendered. Brought before Julian, whom he begged for mercy, Chnodomar was sent on to the court of Constantius at Milan. Not long afterwards, he died of disease in a camp for barbarian prisoners in Rome.

== Aftermath ==
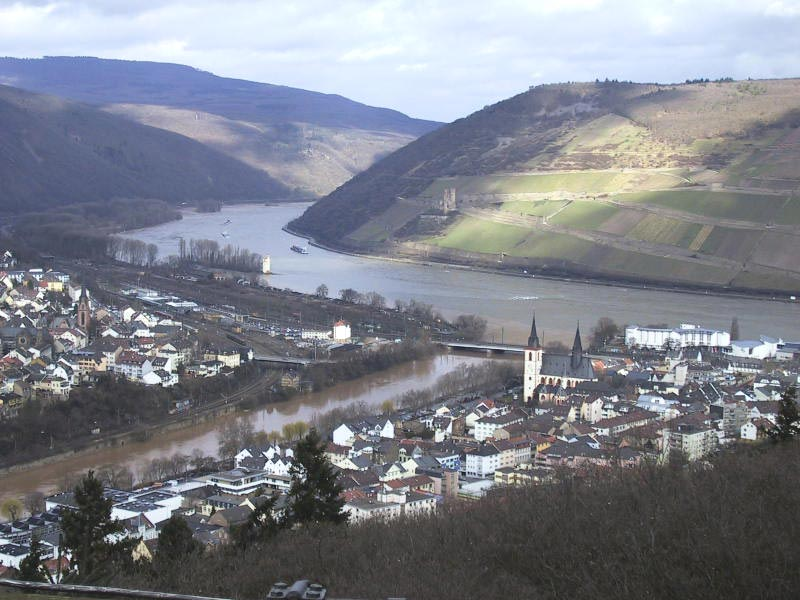
The River Rhine, which in the 4th century constituted the border of the Roman empire with barbarian Germania (right bank), showing Bingen am Rhein (foreground) on both banks of the tributary river Nahe. The Roman fort at this strategic site was repaired by Julian in 359 CE.

After the battle, Julian was acclaimed as Augustus (co-emperor) by his troops, but he vehemently refused the title, which could only legally be bestowed by the ruling Augustus, Constantius. Given the latter's murderous attitude against potential contenders, Julian's caution is understandable, although it bought him no credit with Constantius.

The immediate aftermath of the battle saw a vigorous "ethnic cleansing" campaign as all Alamanni families who had settled in Alsace on stolen land were rounded up and expelled from imperial territory.

The battle was the turning point in Julian's effort to restore the Rhine frontier. Until then, Julian was obliged to campaign largely inside Gaul, with the barbarian bands holding the initiative, playing cat-and-mouse with his forces and causing enormous economic damage to a vital region of the empire. Now Julian was able to take the war to the enemy, each year invading the lands beyond the Rhine, devastating them and terrorising the tribes into accepting tributary status. At the same time, he was able to make serious progress in repairing Rome's shattered line of forts. In Luttwakian terms, he was able to return to a traditional strategy of "forward defence" after being obliged by circumstances to engage in defence-in-depth for three years.

That same year, Julian followed up the battle by an incursion into Alamanni territory beyond the Rhine. After ravaging the lands far and wide, he set about rebuilding a fort in the Agri Decumates (Black Forest) originally built by Trajan in the early 2nd century. He then granted the anxious barbarians a 10-month truce.

In 358, Julian first turned his attention to the Frankish tribes, who had in recent years been impeding shipments of grain from Roman Britain He crossed the lower Rhine and forced the Salii and Chamavi tribes to surrender and become tributarii (tribute-payers). He then restored three important forts on the lower Meuse river, and the fleet carrying grain from Britain increased from 200 to 400 ships. Lastly, he again switched his attention to the Alamanni, crossing the Rhine at Mainz and forcing the submission of the new paramount kings Hortarius and Surmarius.

In 359, Julian restored seven forts and town walls in the middle Rhine, including Bonna (Bonn) and Bingium (Bingen), obliging his new tributary Alamanni to provide the supplies and labour needed. He then crossed the Rhine, marched through the territory of the tributaries and devastated the lands of the other kings who had fought at Strasbourg, including Westralp. All were forced to submit and return the thousands of Roman civilians they had abducted and enslaved during the years of easy plunder.

By 360, Gaul was sufficiently secure to permit Julian to despatch reinforcements of about 3,000 men under magister armorum Lupicinus to Britain, which had suffered a serious land and sea invasion by the Picts of Caledonia (Scotland) and the Scoti of Hibernia (Ireland). But at the same time, Julian received a demand from Constantius, who was unaware of the British expedition, that he send 4 auxilia palatina regiments plus select squadrons of cavalry (about 2,500 men) under Lupicinus to the East as reinforcements for the war against the Persians. This triggered a near-mutiny by Julian's soldiers, who again proclaimed him Augustus. He again refused, but this time, the troops insisted, making it clear they would mutiny if he refused and march against Constantius with or without him. Alarmed, but also secretly pleased, Julian accepted the title and wrote an apologetic letter to Constantius explaining why he had felt it necessary to bow to his soldiers' wishes and requesting his ratification. But this was refused by Constantius, who replied demanding that Julian revert to Caesar status. Julian ignored the order, but to prove his good faith and also to keep his near-mutinous troops occupied, he crossed the Rhine and attacked the Attuarii tribe of the Frankish confederation.

By 361, however, the clash was inevitable. Julian decided to confront Constantius and in July led his supporting troops in three columns eastwards, never to return to Gaul. But the empire was spared another civil war by the senior emperor's sudden death in Asia Minor 3 November; Julian only learned of the event at Naissus late in November. Julian entered Constantinople on 3 December, then after giving Constantius a respectful funeral undertook the responsibilities of sole emperor.
