= Suicide of Tom Pappas =

Death of Tom Pappas

On May 1, 1988, Tom Pappas, chief of staff to then-U.S. Representative Roy Dyson, jumped to his death after allegations from staff members led to implications that he was in a homosexual relationship with Dyson. Following the suicide, Dyson's office was linked to illegal contributions and bribes for the defense subcontractor Unisys to receive favorable appropriations contracts through Dyson's position on the Defense Appropriations Committee. The FBI's Operation Ill Wind resulted in the conviction of key Department of the Navy political appointees who had close ties to Pappas and Dyson.

== Background ==
Pappas was investigated by the Federal Election Commission for allegations that he had campaign contribution checks written to staff members which they then cashed and returned directly to Pappas. In light of the allegations that could implicate Dyson and other members in the office, several staff members, including Press Secretary, Scott Ourth, accused Mr. Pappas in a Washington Post article of unorthodox management practices.

The allegations against Pappas and congressman Dyson by staff members led to accusations that the two were in a homosexual relationship. The congressman denied the homosexual allegations and claimed that the accusations were made in malice. The day the Washington Post published the article suggesting Pappas of misconduct, Pappas jumped to his death from his hotel room during a New York trip to a Unisys factory. The Washington Post defended their reporting of Pappas' conduct. The office of congressman Dyson was later linked to improper contributions and connections to an illegal procurement of Navy Contracts in Operation Ill Wind.

The day of his suicide, Tom Pappas was with the congressman on a trip sponsored by Unisys. The defense contractor was later implicated in a scheme of providing campaign contributions and bribes to key individuals for favorable treatment receiving contracts despite protests against the program from the Navy. The company provided Roy Dyson with $17,000 in campaign contributions. In a federal investigation it was revealed that Dyson and his staff received trips and compensation for providing favorable appropriations to Unisys.

== Outcome ==
Charles Gardner, a former Unisys officer with close contact to the Congressman, was convicted and sentenced in the scheme. Also convicted in the scheme were Assistant Secretary of the Navy, Melvyn Paisley, Deputy Assistant of the Navy, James E. Gaines and Deputy Assistant of the Air Force Victor D. Cohen. Despite the link to the convicted Unisys lobbyist and the search warrants executed against the Congressman's office, neither Dyson or members of is staff were indicted in the scandal. Dyson did return campaign contributions to Unisys and paid a fee for to the FEC for the improper campaign collections from his staff.

The scandal led the United States Congress to pass the 1988 Procurement Integrity Act, which regulates the pay that procurement officials can get from contractors during the first year after they leave government, and forbids them to provide bid and proposal information to their new employers.
