= Heruli (military unit) =

The shield pattern of the Heruli seniores.

The Heruli was an auxilia palatina unit of the Late Roman army, active between the 4th and the 5th century. It was composed of 500 soldiers and was the heir of those ethnic groups that were initially used as auxiliary units of the Roman army and later integrated in the Roman Empire after the Constitutio Antoniniana. Their name was derived from the people of the Heruli. In the sources they are usually recorded together with the Batavi, and it is probable the two units fought together. At the beginning of the 5th century two related units are attested, the Heruli seniores in the West and the Heruli iuniores in the East.

== History ==
The Heruli probably belonged to the army of the emperor Julian, and probably fought in the Battle of Strasbourg (357), even if the sources do not mention them.

In 360, before Julian received the order to send most of his troops to Emperor Constantius II for a campaign in the East, the Heruli, the Batavi and two numeri Moesiacorum were sent ton Britain under the command of Lupicinus, Julian's magister militum, probably to counter a rebellion. They embarked at Bononia (Boulogne-sur-Mer) and arrived at Rutupiae. Later the Batavi and the Heruli returned to the continent, but it is unknown when this happened.

The Emperors Valentinian I and Valens divided the army among themselves. Many units were divided into two sub-units, sharing the name of the original unit and each distinguished by the name seniores, for the units of the senior Augustus Valentinian, and iuniores, for the units of the iunior Augustus Valens, and aggregated respectively to the Western Roman army and to the Eastern Roman army.

In 365, Emperor Valentinian I (364–375) had to confront the invading Germans. The barbarians were able to capture the banners of the Batavi and Heruli units, which were made the object of derision by the raiders until recovered.

In 367–369 there was a revolt in Britain against Valentinian I, known as Great Conspiracy and put down by the later emperor Theodosius I. On this occasion, both the Batavi and the Heruli were sent to Britain, along with the Iovii and Victores. They landed at Richborough and headed for London.

The Notitia Dignitatum, a document prepared in the years 400–420, shows the deployment of the Heruli seniores under the command of the magister peditum for Italy.

== See also ==
- Regii
