= Nora Slatkin =

American government official (born 1955)

Nora Slatkin (born May 5, 1955) was United States Assistant Secretary of the Navy (Research, Development and Acquisitions) from 1993 to 1995 and Executive Director of the Central Intelligence Agency from 1995 to 1998.

== Biography ==
Born in Glen Cove, New York, Slatkin graduated from Plainedge High School in Massapequa, New York, in 1973. She was educated at Lehigh University (B.A. in International Relations, 1977) and Georgetown University (M.S. in Foreign Policy, 1979).

In 1979, Slatkin joined the Congressional Budget Office as a Principal Defense Analyst. In 1986, she joined the professional staff of the United States House Committee on Armed Services.

President of the United States Bill Clinton nominated Slatkin as Assistant Secretary of the Navy (Research, Development and Acquisitions) in 1993 and Slatkin held this office from October 22, 1993 until May 16, 1995.

When John M. Deutch became Director of Central Intelligence in 1995, he asked Slatkin to join his senior staff as part of a major "management shakeup" at the Central Intelligence Agency. Slatkin subsequently became the #3 person in the CIA, serving as Executive Director of the CIA from 1995 to 1997. According to The New York Times, Deutch "turned over the administration of the C.I.A." to Slatkin in this period.

Upon leaving government service in 1997, Slatkin joined Citigroup. There, she has worked in the following areas: Business Process Improvement (1997–98); Corporate Services Director (1998–2000); Head of Government Relations (2000–2001); Chief Marketing Officer for Consumer Lending Group (September 2001 – January 2008); the Reengineering Group (January 2008–September 2009); and in Corporate Treasury (October 2009 to present).

== Personal ==
Slatkin was married to Deral Eugene Willis (December 4, 1938 – June 4, 2000). They had a son, two daughters and five granddaughters. Her husband was a retired U.S. Army colonel.

Government offices
Preceded by Gerald A. Cann	Assistant Secretary of the Navy (Research, Development and Acquisitions); October 22, 1993 – May 16, 1995	Succeeded by John W. Douglass
