= David E. Mann =

American government official (1924–2018)

David E. Mann (November 4, 1924 – July 22, 2018) was an American who served as Assistant Secretary of the Navy (Research, Engineering and Systems) from 1977 to 1981.

== Biography ==
=== Early life ===
David E. Mann was born in Manhattan, New York on November 4, 1924. He was educated at the City University of New York, receiving his B.S. in 1944. He did his graduate work at the University of Chicago, receiving first an M.S. and then a Ph.D. in Chemistry in 1948. He then did postdoctoral research in molecular spectroscopy at the University of Minnesota and Harvard University.

=== Career ===
In 1951, Mann joined the National Bureau of Standards as a physicist and as Chief of the Molecular Spectroscopy section. He took a sabbatical in 1956–57, having won a Fulbright Scholarship and a Guggenheim Fellowship. He then returned to the National Bureau of Standards, working there until 1965. During this time, he became well known for his research in the application of cryospectroscopy to the determination of the molecular structures of high–temperature and unstable molecules.

Mann joined the Advanced Research Projects Agency in 1966, and in 1967 became deputy director of its Ballistics Missile Defense Office. He became head of its Strategic Technology Office in 1968; there, he began development programs in high energy lasers, long–range infrared and radar sensors, special communications techniques, and a wide range of undersea and ASW sensor technology. For this work, he was awarded the Secretary of Defense Meritorious Civilian Service Award in 1974.

He joined the United States Department of the Navy in 1973 as Special Assistant to the Chief of Naval Operations for Navy Advanced Systems Projects.

On March 21, 1977, President of the United States Jimmy Carter nominated Mann as Assistant Secretary of the Navy (Research, Engineering and Systems), and Mann went on to hold this office from April 1977 until January 1981. As Assistant Secretary, he oversaw the development of advanced antisubmarine warfare systems.

== Sources ==
- Press Release Announcing Mann's Appointment as Assistant Secretary of the Navy (Research, Engineering and Systems)
- Profile from the Naval Engineers Journal

Government offices
Preceded by H. Tyler Marcy (as Assistant Secretary of the Navy (Research and Development))	Assistant Secretary of the Navy (Research and Development); April 1977 – January 1981	Succeeded by Gerald A. Cann
