= Gerald A. Cann =

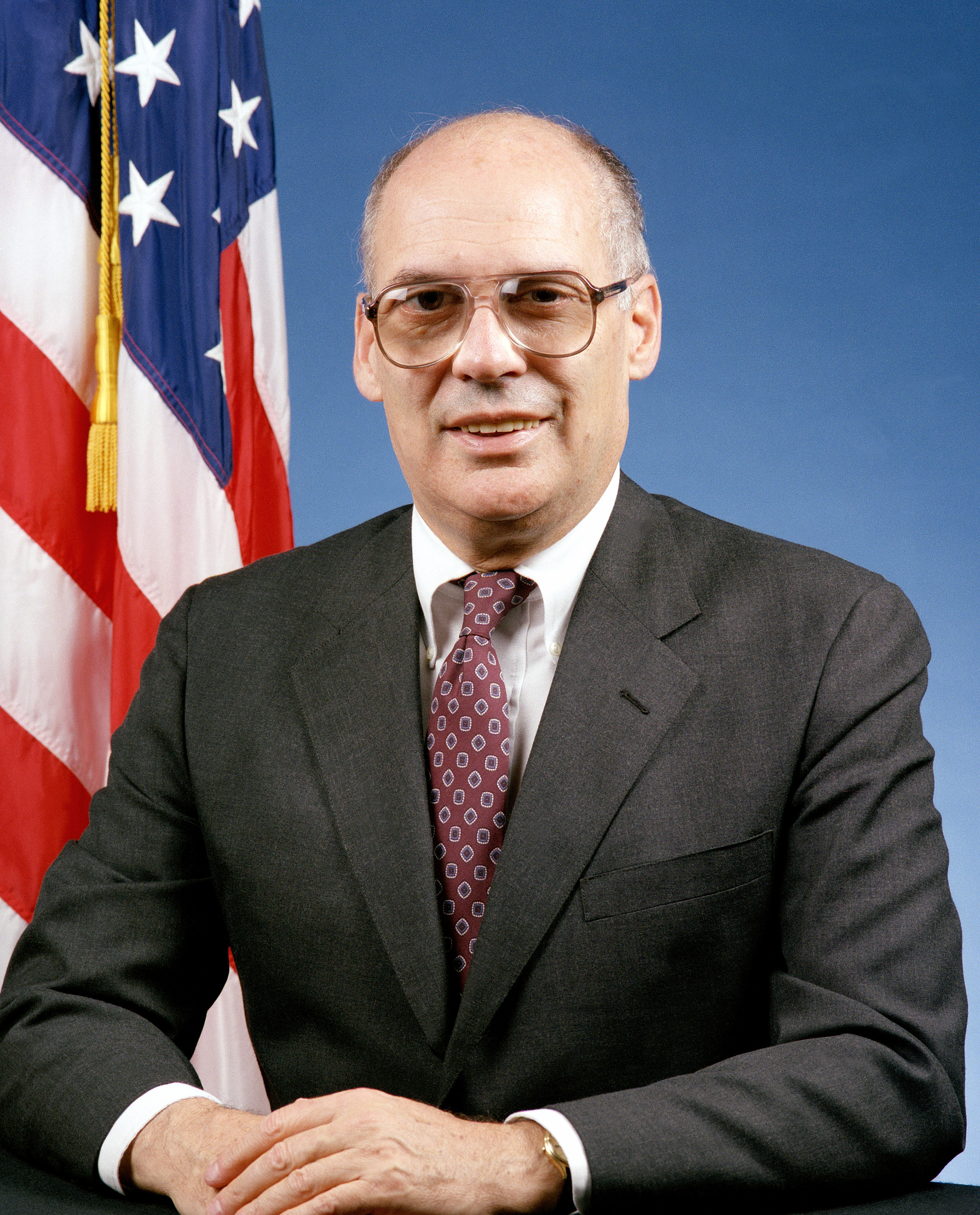
Gerald A. Cann in May 1990

Gerald A. Cann (April 29, 1931 - September 24, 2024), was Assistant Secretary of the Navy (Research, Engineering and Systems) in 1981 and the first Assistant Secretary of the Navy (Research, Development and Acquisitions) from 1990 to 1993.

== Biography ==
Gerald A. Cann was born April 29, 1931, in New York City. He graduated from the Darrow School in June 1949 and then attended New York University, receiving a B.A. in geology and geophysics in June 1953. Upon graduating, he joined the U.S. Army Signal Corps, serving there until 1955. He then joined the American Machine and Foundry Co. In 1965, he joined TRW as assistant program manager for surface ship sonar systems and program manager for undersea surveillance.

Cann joined the government in 1970 as assistant director for ocean surveillance at the Office of the Director of Defense Research and Engineering. In 1977, he became Deputy Assistant Secretary of the Navy for Systems. In 1979, he became Principal Deputy Assistant Secretary of the Navy for Research, Engineering, and Systems.

In 1981, President of the United States Ronald Reagan nominated Cann as Assistant Secretary of the Navy (Research, Engineering and Systems) and Cann held this office from January 1981 until December 1981.

Cann left government service in 1985 to become president of his own company, Gerald A. Cann, Inc. In 1988, he joined General Dynamics as vice president of GD's undersea warfare center in Arlington, Virginia.

In 1990, President George H. W. Bush nominated Cann as Assistant Secretary of the Navy (Research, Development and Acquisitions) and Cann served in this office from March 1990 until January 1993.

Gerald Cann passed away on September 24, 2024, at the age of 93.

Government offices
Preceded by David E. Mann	Assistant Secretary of the Navy (Research and Development); January 1981 – December 1981	Succeeded by Melvyn R. Paisley
Preceded by New Office	Assistant Secretary of the Navy (Research, Development and Acquisitions); March 1990 – January 1993	Succeeded by Nora Slatkin
