= Assistant Secretary of the Navy (AIR) =

Civilian office of the US Navy

The Assistant Secretary of the Navy (AIR) was a civilian office of the United States Department of the Navy. The assistant secretary of the Navy (AIR) initially reported to the assistant secretary of the Navy and later to the under secretary of the Navy.

Flag of the Assistant Secretary of the Navy for Aeronautics

With the emergence of naval aviation as a major new military technique, the Navy had increasingly large organizations to oversee it. From 1910, there was an Officer in Charge of Aviation, then a Director of Naval Aeronautics, then in 1916 a Director of Naval Aviation. In 1921, Congress replaced those positions with a distinct Bureau of Aeronautics. Finally, on June 24, 1926, Congress created the position of Assistant Secretary of the Navy for Aeronautics to oversee the United States' naval aviation forces. The position was vacant from 1932 until 1941, and upon being re-occupied, the position was re-titled Assistant Secretary of the Navy (AIR) on September 11, 1941.

On February 6, 1959, the office was redesignated Assistant Secretary of the Navy (Research and Development). In April 1977, the name was changed to Assistant Secretary of the Navy (Research, Engineering and Systems).

The office was disestablished in 1990, when the office was merged with the office of Assistant Secretary of the Navy (Shipbuilding and Logistics) to create the new office of Assistant Secretary of the Navy (Research, Development and Acquisitions).

== Assistant Secretaries of the Navy for Aeronautics, 1926—1932 ==
Name	Assumed office	Left office	President appointed by	Secretary served under
Edward Pearson Warner	July 7, 1926	March 15, 1929	Calvin Coolidge	Curtis D. Wilbur
David Sinton Ingalls	March 16, 1929	June 1, 1932	Herbert Hoover	Charles Francis Adams III

== Assistant Secretaries of the Navy (AIR), 1941—1959 ==
Name	Assumed office	Left office	President appointed by	Secretary served under
Artemus Gates	September 5, 1941	June 30, 1945	Franklin D. Roosevelt	Frank Knox, James Forrestal
John L. Sullivan	July 5, 1945	June 17, 1946	Harry S. Truman	James Forrestal
John N. Brown	January 12, 1946	March 8, 1949	Harry S. Truman	James Forrestal, John L. Sullivan
Dan A. Kimball	March 9, 1949	May 24, 1949	Harry S. Truman	John L. Sullivan
John F. Floberg	December 5, 1949	July 23, 1953	Harry S. Truman	Francis P. Matthews, Dan A. Kimball, Robert B. Anderson
James H. Smith, Jr.	July 23, 1953	June 20, 1956	Dwight D. Eisenhower	Robert B. Anderson, Charles Thomas
Garrison Norton	July 7, 1956	February 5, 1959	Dwight D. Eisenhower	Charles Thomas, Thomas S. Gates, Jr.

== Assistant Secretaries of the Navy (Research and Development), 1959—1977 ==
Name	Assumed office	Left office	President appointed by	Secretary served under
James H. Wakelin, Jr.	June 5, 1959	June 30, 1964	Dwight D. Eisenhower	William B. Franke, John Connally, Fred Korth, Paul Nitze
Robert W. Morse	July 1, 1964	June 30, 1966	Lyndon B. Johnson	Paul Nitze
Robert A. Frosch	July 1, 1966	January 20, 1973	Lyndon B. Johnson, Richard M. Nixon	Paul Nitze, Paul Ignatius, John Chafee, John Warner
David S. Potter	September 14, 1973	August 16, 1974	Richard Nixon	John Warner, J. William Middendorf
H. Tyler Marcy	October 15, 1974	April 4, 1977	Gerald Ford	J. William Middendorf

== Assistant Secretaries of the Navy (Research, Engineering and Systems), 1977—1990 ==
Name	Assumed office	Left office	President appointed by	Secretary served under
David E. Mann	April 1977	January 1981	Jimmy Carter	W. Graham Claytor, Jr., Edward Hidalgo
Gerald A. Cann	January 1981	December 1981	Ronald Reagan	John Lehman
Melvyn R. Paisley	December 1981	March 1987	Ronald Reagan	John Lehman
