= Assistant Secretary of the Navy (Shipbuilding and Logistics) =

Civilian office of the US Navy

The Assistant Secretary of the Navy (Shipbuilding and Logistics) was a civilian office in the United States Department of the Navy. The Assistant Secretary of the Navy (Shipbuilding and Logistics) oversaw the building of ships for the United States Navy and other logistical matters.

The office of Assistant Secretary of the Navy (Shipbuilding and Logistics) was abolished in 1990, when it was merged with the office of Assistant Secretary of the Navy (Research, Engineering and Systems) to form the new office of Assistant Secretary of the Navy (Research, Development and Acquisitions).
