= Petulantes =

Auxilia palatina of the Late Roman army

Shield of the Petulantes seniores, an auxilia palatina unit under the command of the magister peditum. Pattern according to Notitia Dignitatum.

Petulantes was an auxilia palatina of the Late Roman army.

== History ==
It is possible they fought in the Battle of the Milvian Bridge for Emperor Constantine I (312). This assumption is based on the fact that Constantine had possibly had them portrayed on his triumphal arch in Rome.

In the 4th century, the Petulantes were in the army of the emperor Julian. The unit amounted to 500 men, but, in order to obtain a tactically valid unit, they were often united with the Celtae. As part of Julian's army, the Petulantes took part in the victorious Battle of Strasbourg (357). When Julian, camped in Lutetia, received the order from his cousin the Emperor Constantius II to send some troops (including the Petulantes) to the east, the troops revolted, because Julian had promised to keep them near their families. One of the standard-bearers of the Petulantes, Maurus, put the crown on Julian's head, proclaiming him Augustus (361). Together with the Celtae, the Petulantes fought against the Alamanni near Sanctium, in Raetia.

In 365, the Augustus Senior of the west, Valentinian I, and the Augustus Iunior of the east, Valens, divided the army in two parts, and it is possible that in this occasion the Petulantes were divided into two units, the seniores and the iuniores. The Notitia Dignitatum, an early-5th century document, lists the Petulantes seniores among the auxilia palatina, the elite units, under the command of the magister peditum of the west. The same document gives the Petulantes iuniores under the command of the magister militum per Illyricum, with a different shield pattern.
