= H. Tyler Marcy =

American government official (1918–2014)

H. Tyler "Ty" Marcy (September 14, 1918 – September 19, 2014) was an IBM executive who served as United States Assistant Secretary of the Navy (Research and Development) from 1974 to 1977.

== Biography ==
=== Early life ===
Ty Marcy was born in 1918 in Rochester, New York and was raised in Baltimore. After high school, he attended the Massachusetts Institute of Technology, receiving a B.S. and, in 1941, an M.S. in electrical engineering. In 1941, he took a job at MIT's Servomechanism Laboratory, where he worked on gun control systems until the end of World War II. In 1946, he joined M. W. Kellogg Limited as associate director of their Special Projects Department. His work at M. W. Kellogg focused on rocket engine development, missile controls, and analog air defense systems.

=== Career ===
In 1951, Marcy left M. W. Kellogg for IBM. His first project there involved working on the bomb/navigation system of the B-52 Stratofortress. He then moved on to work on commercial development of data processing machines and peripheral devices. In 1956, Marcy became Assistant Manager of Product Development at IBM's Corporate Headquarters in New York City. The next year he moved to Poughkeepsie, New York, as manager of the IBM laboratory there. In 1965, he became vice-president of IBM's General Products Division; in 1967, vice-president of the Systems Development Division; and, in 1968, Director of Technology at IBM's Corporate Headquarters in Armonk, New York.

Marcy left IBM in 1972 to do work as a consultant in the areas of engineering management, technology, and program review.

In 1974, President of the United States Richard Nixon nominated Marcy as Assistant Secretary of the Navy (Research and Development) and he subsequently held this office from October 15, 1974, until April 4, 1977.

Marcy was made a life fellow of the Institute of Electrical and Electronics Engineers in 1967 for his "leadership in feedback control, in professional society activities and significant contributions to management of engineering enterprises". He was president of the Instrument Society of America from 1971 to 1974. On September 19, 2014, Marcy died at the age of 96 in Brewster, Massachusetts.

== Sources ==
- H. Tyler Marcy, "Banquet Address: 'Built-in' Combat Readiness—An Approach to Future Ship Designs," Naval Engineers Journal, Volume 88 Issue 3 (Mar. 18, 2009), p. 40
- IEEE citation

Government offices
Preceded by David S. Potter	Assistant Secretary of the Navy (Research and Development); October 15, 1974 – April 4, 1977	Succeeded by David E. Mann (as Assistant Secretary of the Navy (Research, Engineering and Systems))
