= Melvyn R. Paisley =

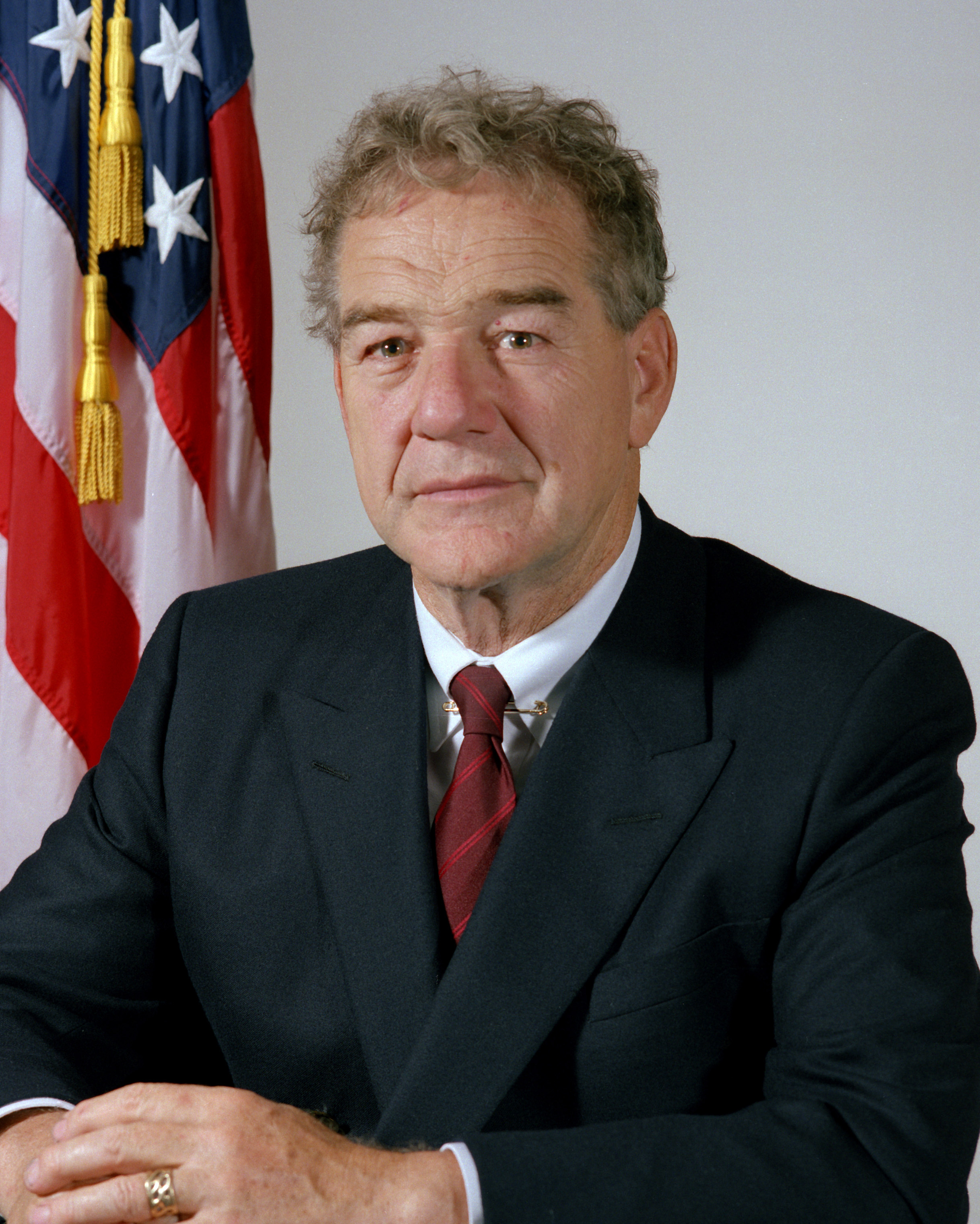
- Melvyn R. Paisley in 1986

Assistant Secretary of the Navy (Research, Engineering and Systems)
- In office December 1981 – March 1987
- President: Ronald Reagan
- Preceded by: Gerald A. Cann
- Succeeded by: Office abolished

Personal details
- Born: Melvin Robert Paisley; October 9, 1924 Portland, Oregon
- Died: December 19, 2001 (aged 77)
- Party: Republican
- Education: Massachusetts Institute of Technology
- Occupation: engineer consultant
- Awards: Distinguished Service Cross; Silver Star (2); Distinguished Flying Cross

Military service
- Allegiance: United States
- Branch/service: United States Army Air Corps
- Rank: Captain
- Battles/wars: World War II

Melvyn Robert Paisley (October 9, 1924 – December 19, 2001) was appointed United States Assistant Secretary of the Navy (Research, Engineering and Systems) by President Ronald Reagan from 1981 to 1987. He was prosecuted in Operation Ill Wind in which he, numerous other government employees and 60 private citizens were arrested. In 1991, he admitted that while in office he had accepted hundreds of thousands of dollars of bribes and was sentenced to four years in prison.

== Biography ==
Melvyn R. Paisley was born on October 9, 1924, in Portland, Oregon. He grew up in a logging camp where his father was a lumberjack and his mother was a cook. During World War II, Paisley enlisted in the United States Army Air Corps and became a distinguished pilot. He flew the P-47 Thunderbolt with the 366th Fighter Group in the 9th Air Force, downed six enemy airplanes and was subsequently awarded the Distinguished Service Cross, two Silver Stars and the Distinguished Flying Cross.

After the war, Paisley studied engineering and received a bachelor's degree from the American Institute of Technology in 1953 and a master's degree from the Massachusetts Institute of Technology in 1954.

== Career ==
In 1954, Paisley joined Boeing. His first job was working as an engineer on the CIM-10 Bomarc. In 1959, he became head of the electronics staff for the LGM-30 Minuteman, focused on the development of a radio launch system. In 1961, he became engineering manager of the Minuteman missile facility at Great Falls, Montana. He later headed Boeing's efforts on the Safeguard Program and later as electronics proposal manager for the B-1 Lancer. In 1971, he became head of Boeing's Evergreen 747 Supertanker program. Finally, he was promoted to the role of Boeing's Director of Planning.

Paisley was close to John Lehman. When Lehman became United States Secretary of the Navy in 1981, Lehman convinced President of the United States Ronald Reagan to nominate Paisley as Assistant Secretary of the Navy (Research, Engineering and Systems). He held this office from December 1981 until March 1987. Lehman and Paisley gained a reputation as being somewhat heavy-handed as managers, but effective at slicing red tape.

=== Operation Ill Wind ===
In 1986, federal prosecutors sued Paisley, arguing that a $183,000 severance package Paisley received upon leaving Boeing compromised his objectivity as Assistant Secretary of the Navy (Research, Engineering and Systems). The Supreme Court of the United States later ruled that such severance packages were not illegal.

Upon leaving government in 1987, Paisley worked as a consultant, guiding companies like Martin Marietta and United Technologies Corporation through the procurement process.

In 1991, federal prosecutors indicted Paisley for receiving bribes during his time as Assistant Secretary of the Navy. In the course of pleading guilty, Paisley admitted that he had received hundreds of thousands of dollars in bribes from an Israeli manufacturer of pilotless reconnaissance planes and for providing confidential information to allow the Sperry Corporation to enable them to win a bid for the Aegis Combat System. Paisley was sentenced to four years in prison and fined $50,000.

=== Retirement ===
Paisley was released from prison in 1995. He spent the rest of his time painting and collecting World War II films. Shortly before his death, Paisley was a consultant for Shooting War, a two-hour documentary about World War II narrated by Tom Hanks.

Paisley died of cancer on December 19, 2001. He was buried in Arlington National Cemetery.

== See also ==
- Lekem

Government offices
Preceded by Gerald A. Cann	Assistant Secretary of the Navy (Research and Development); December 1981 – March 1987	Succeeded by Office Abolished
