= Batavi (military unit) =

Military unit of the Roman army

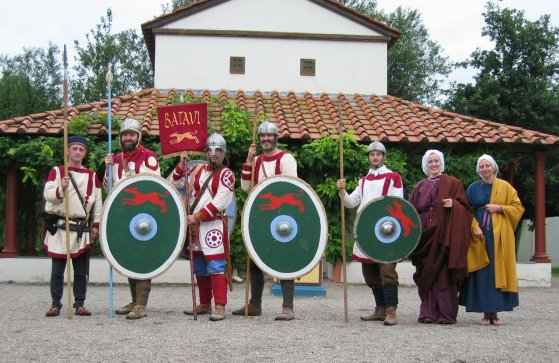
Re-enactment group interpreting the Batavi iuniores

The Batavi was an auxilia palatina (infantry) unit of the late Roman army, active between the 4th and the 5th century. It was composed by 500 soldiers and was the heir of those ethnic groups that were initially used as auxiliary units of the Roman army and later integrated in the Roman Empire after the Constitutio Antoniniana. Their name was derived from the people of the Batavi.

In the sources they are usually recorded together with the Heruli, and it is probable the two units fought together.

At the beginning of the 5th century two related units are attested, the Batavi seniores and the Batavi iuniores.

== History ==
=== Batavi ===
Battle deployment of the Battle of Strasbourg (357). The Batavi were on the second line of the Roman formation.

The Batavi belonged to the army of the emperor Julian, and fought in the Battle of Strasbourg (357). Deployed in the second line, together with the Regii, the Batavi sustained the assault of the outnumbering Alamannic infantry, which had broken the Roman first line. Pushed back until the hill where the Roman camp had been built, the Batavi were reinforced by the camp guards and repulsed and broke the enemy.

In 360, before Julian received the order of sending most of his troops to emperor Constantius II of a campaign in the East, the Batavi, the Heruli and two numeri Moesiacorum were sent to Britain under the command of Lupicinus, Julian's magister militum, probably to counter a rebellion. Later the Batavi and the Heruli returned on the continent, but it is unknown when this happened.

=== Batavi seniores and iuniores ===
The Emperors Valentinian I and Valens divided the army among themselves. Many units were divided into two sub-units, sharing the name of the original unit and each distinguished by the name seniores, for the units of the senior Augustus Valentinian, and iuniores, for the units of the iunior Augustus Valens, and aggregated respectively to the Western Roman army and to the Eastern Roman army.

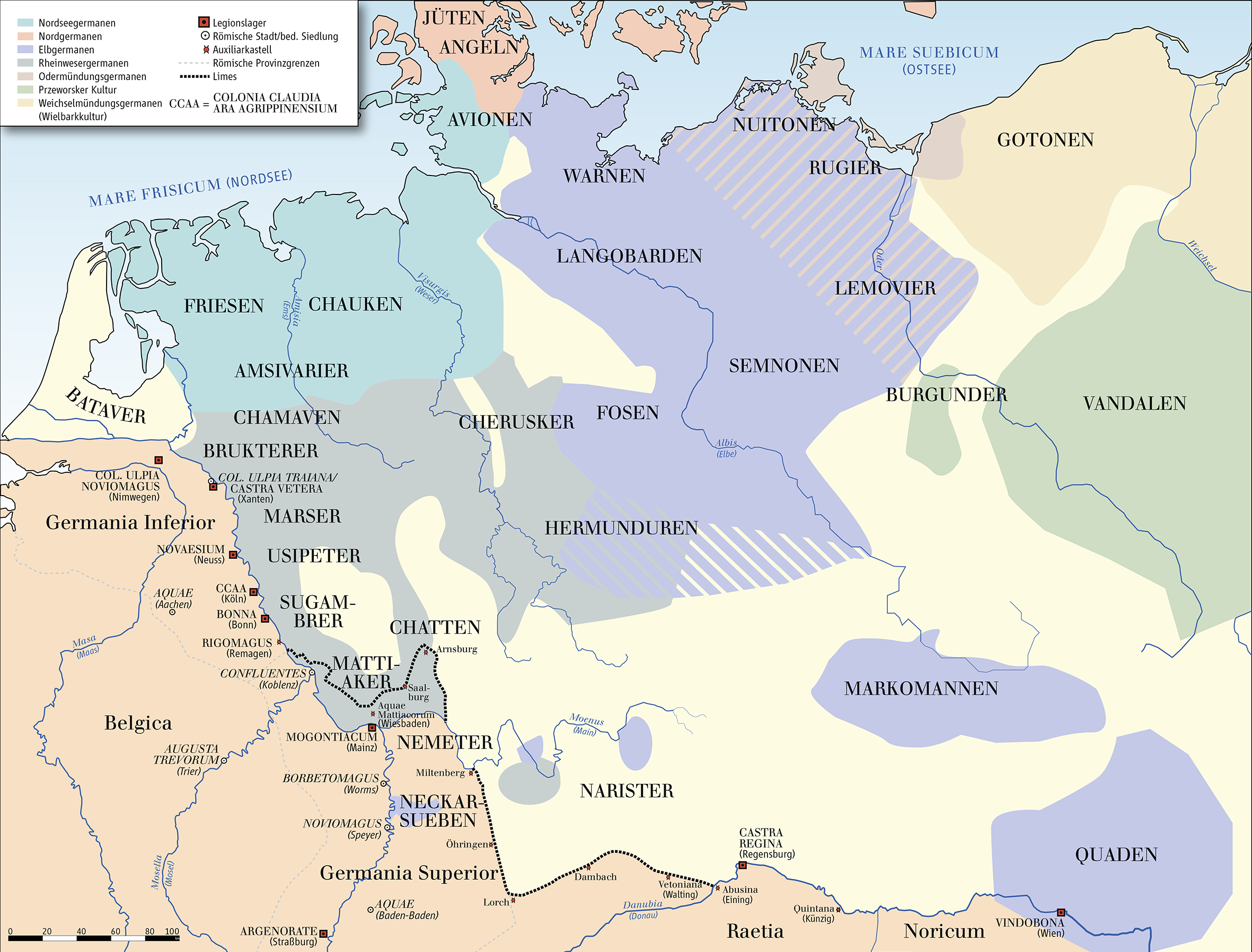
Germanic situation circa 50 CE

In 365, when Emperor Valentinian I (364-375) had to confront the invading Germans and was defeated in battle, the inquires found that the Batavi (seniores) had been the first to flee. Before the whole army, Valentinian put the shame on the Batavi, and ordered to strip them of their arms and to sell them as runaway slaves. The soldiers of the legion bowed to the Emperor begging him to forgive them and give them an opportunity to redeem themselves and, at his invitation, took up arms, left the camp and attacked the enemies, killing the great part of them. It happened too (it is unclear whether at this time or not) that the barbarians were able to subtract the banner of the Batavi and Heruli units, which were made the object of derision by the raiders.

In 367–369 there was a revolt in Britain against Valentinian I, known as the Great Conspiracy and put down by Theodosius the Elder, father of the later emperor Theodosius I. In this occasion, both the Batavi and the Heruli were sent to Britain along with Iovii and Victores. They landed at Richborough and headed for London.

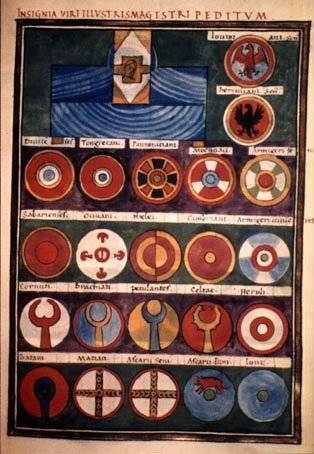
Page from the Notitia Dignitatum depicting the shields of the units under the command of the Magister peditum of Italy. The first shield on the last line belongs to the Batavi seniores.

The Batavi (probably iuniores) also took part in one of the most significant battles of antiquity, the Battle of Adrianople (378), during which they were deployed in the reserve. When the magister equitum Victor joined them on the orders of Emperor Valens to start a desperate resistance, he discovered that they had already fled.

The Notitia Dignitatum, a document prepared in the years 400-420, shows the deployment of the Batavi seniores and of the Batavi iuniores. The Batavi seniores are listed both under the command of the Magister militum praesentalis in the East and under that of the Magister peditum for Italy in the West. The Batavi iuniores are listed under the command of the Magister peditum for Italy, but they were probably sent to reinforce the army of Gaul, since they are also under the Magister equitum of Gaul.

== Military units ==
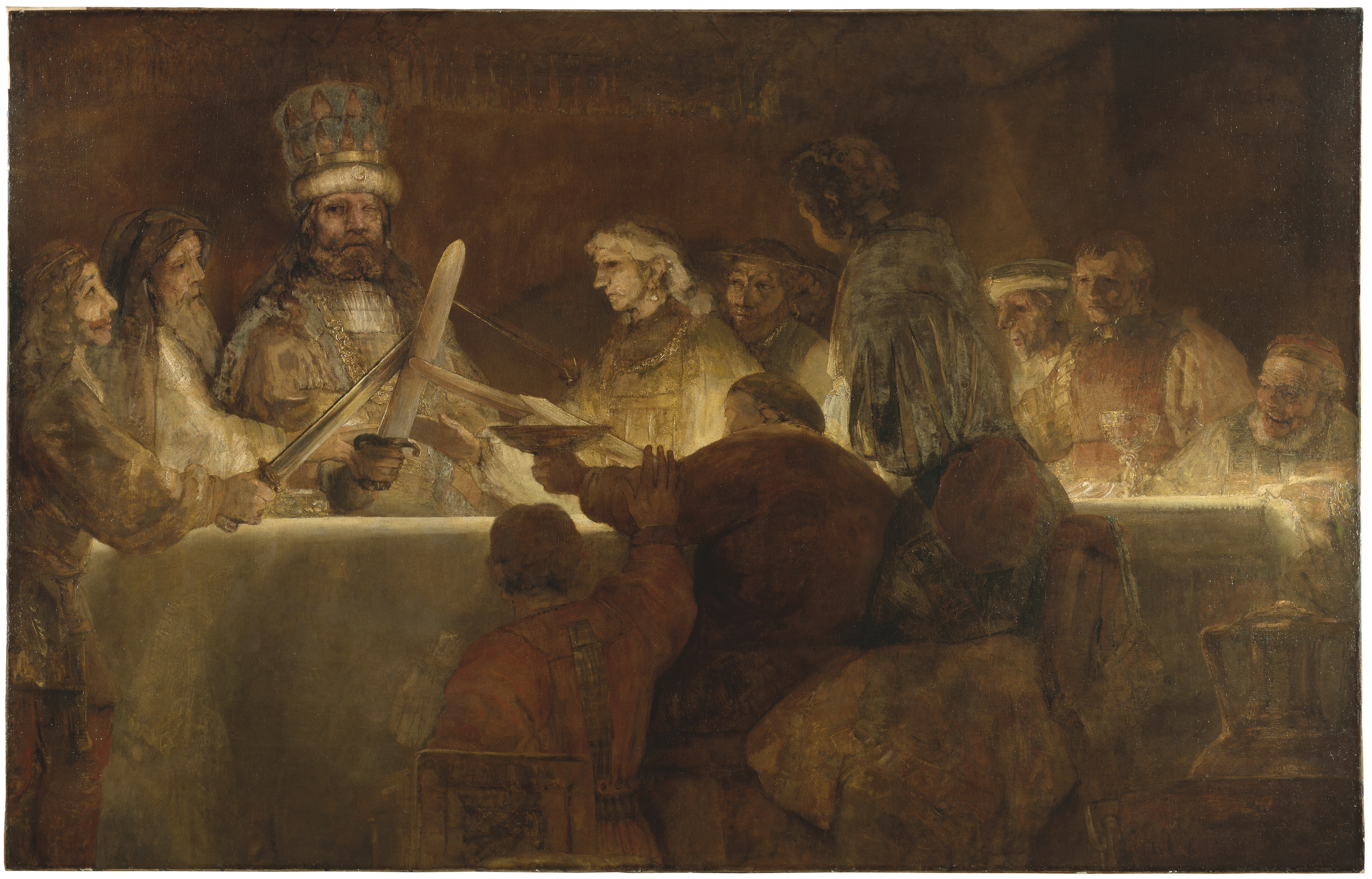
The Conspiracy of the Batavians under Claudius Civilis by Rembrandt van Rijn

The first Batavi commander we know of is named Chariovalda, who led a charge across the Visurgin (Weser) against the Cherusci led by Arminius during the campaigns of Germanicus in Germania Transrhenana.

Tacitus (De origine et situ Germanorum XXIX) described the Batavi as the bravest of the tribes of the area, hardened in the Germanic wars, with cohorts under their own commanders transferred to Britannia. They retained the honour of the ancient association with the Romans, not required to pay tribute or taxes and used by the Romans only for war: "They furnished to the Empire nothing but men and arms", Tacitus remarked. Well regarded for their skills in horsemanship and swimming—for men and horses could cross the Rhine without losing formation, according to Tacitus. Dio Cassius describes this surprise tactic employed by Aulus Plautius against the "barbarians"—the British Celts—at the battle of the River Medway, 43:

The barbarians thought that Romans would not be able to cross it without a bridge, and consequently bivouacked in rather careless fashion on the opposite bank; but he sent across a detachment of Germanic tribesmen, who were accustomed to swim easily in full armour across the most turbulent streams. [...] Thence the Britons retired to the river Thames at a point near where it empties into the ocean and at flood-tide forms a lake. This they easily crossed because they knew where the firm ground and the easy passages in this region were to be found; but the Romans in attempting to follow them were not so successful. However, the Germans swam across again and some others got over by a bridge a little way up-stream, after which they assailed the barbarians from several sides at once and cut down many of them. (Cassius Dio, Roman History, Book 60:20)

It is uncertain how they were able to accomplish this feat. The late 4th century writer on Roman military affairs Vegetius mentions soldiers using reed rafts, drawn by leather leads, to transport equipment across rivers. But the sources suggest the Batavi were able to swim across rivers actually wearing full armour and weapons. This would only have been possible by the use of some kind of buoyancy device: Ammianus Marcellinus mentions that the Cornuti regiment swam across a river floating on their shields "as on a canoe" (357). Since the shields were wooden, they may have provided sufficient buoyancy

The Batavi were used to form the bulk of the Emperor's personal Germanic bodyguard from Augustus to Galba. They also provided a contingent for their indirect successors, the Emperor's horse guards, the Equites singulares Augusti.

A Batavian contingent was used in an amphibious assault on Ynys Mon (Anglesey), taking the assembled Druids by surprise, as they were only expecting Roman ships.

Numerous altars and tombstones of the cohorts of Batavi, dating to the 2nd century and 3rd century, have been found along Hadrian's Wall, notably at Castlecary and Carrawburgh, Germany, Yugoslavia, Hungary, Romania and Austria.

=== Imperial Bodyguards of the Roman Empire ===
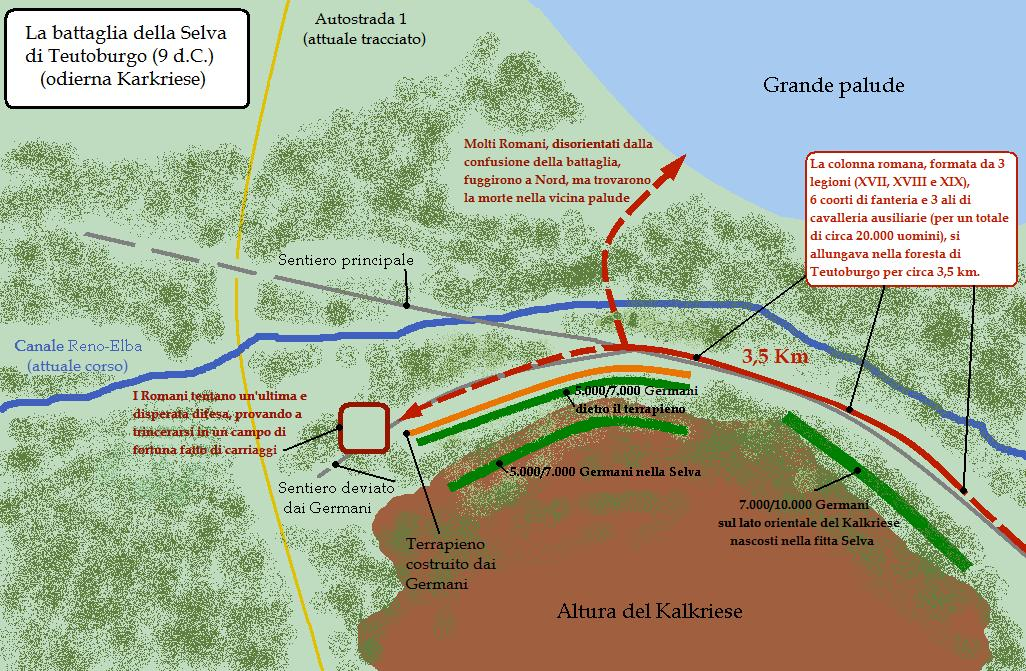
Map showing the defeat of Varus in the Teutoburg Forest.

The members of the German Bodyguard were recruited from the West Germanic-speaking tribes resident in, or on the borders of, the Roman province of Germania Inferior, with most recruits drawn from the Batavi but also from neighbouring tribes of the Rhine delta region, including the Frisii, Baetasii and Ubii. Little is known about their organisation; from inscriptions it is known that there existed, as in all Roman cavalry units, the officer rank of decurion. The exact size of the unit, which was at least partially mounted, is also unknown, but is described in ancient sources as a cohort, which in this period normally implied a strength of ca. 500 men, or less precisely as a numerus, whose size could vary. Under the Emperor Caligula, the Bodyguard may have consisted of 500 to 1,000 men.

The German Bodyguard was valued as loyal and reliable. Emperors like Nero trusted the Germani especially because they were not of Roman origin.

The Bodyguard was disbanded briefly after the Battle of the Teutoburg Forest, and was finally dissolved by Galba in 68, because of its loyalty to Nero (ruled 54-68), whom he had overthrown. The decision caused deep offence to the Batavi, and contributed to the outbreak of the Revolt of the Batavi in the following year. Their indirect successors were the Equites singulares Augusti which were, likewise, mainly recruited from the Germani. They were apparently so similar to the Julio-Claudians' earlier German Bodyguard that they were given the same nickname, the "Batavi".

=== Revolt of the Batavi ===
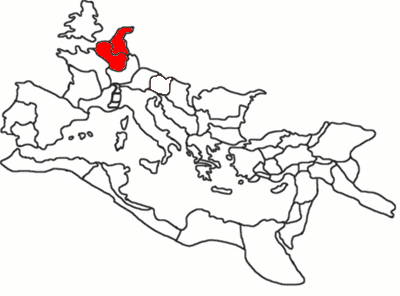
The two Roman provinces of Belgica and Germania Inferior

Despite the alliance, one of the high-ranking Batavi, Julius Paullus, to give him his Roman name, was executed by Fonteius Capito on a false charge of rebellion. His kinsman Gaius Julius Civilis was paraded in chains in Rome before Nero; though he was acquitted by Galba, he was retained at Rome, and when he returned to his kin in the year of upheaval in the Roman Empire, 69, he headed a Batavian rebellion. He managed to capture Castra Vetera, the Romans lost two legions while two others (I Germanica and XVI Gallica) were controlled by the rebels. The rebellion became a real threat to the Empire when the conflict escalated to northern Gaul and Germania. The Roman army retaliated and invaded the insula Batavorum. A bridge was built over the river Nabalia, where the warring parties approached each other on both sides to negotiate peace. The narrative was told in great detail in Tacitus' History, book iv, although, unfortunately, the narrative breaks off abruptly at the climax. Following the uprising, Legio X Gemina was housed in a stone castra to keep an eye on the Batavians.

== See also ==
- Numerus Batavorum

== Bibliography ==
- Nico Roymans, "Hercules and the construction of a Batavian identity in the context of the Roman empire", in Ton Derks, Nico Roymans (ed.), Ethnic Constructs in Antiquity: The Role of Power and Tradition (Amsterdam, Amsterdam University Press, 2009) (Amsterdam Archaeological Studies, 13), 219-238.
- Ton Derks, "Ethnic identity in the Roman frontier. The epigraphy of Batavi and other Lower Rhine tribes", in Ton Derks, Nico Roymans (ed.), Ethnic Constructs in Antiquity: The Role of Power and Tradition (Amsterdam, Amsterdam University Press, 2009) (Amsterdam Archaeological Studies, 13), 239-282.
