= Operation Ill Wind =

Operation Ill Wind was a three-year investigation launched in 1986 by the United States Federal Bureau of Investigation into corruption by U.S. government and military officials, and private defense contractors. Charles "Chuck" Duff was the sole Air Force Action Officer responsible for developing, coordinating and implementing Air Force actions relating to the Department of Justice's "Ill Wind" procurement fraud investigation. Government officials, private individuals and companies were eventually convicted of various crimes including nine government officials, 69 Washington consultants and 7 military contractors, as well as executives at GE, Boeing and United Technologies.

Melvyn Paisley, appointed Assistant Secretary of the Navy in 1981 by Republican President Ronald Reagan, was found to have accepted hundreds of thousands of dollars in bribes. He pleaded guilty to bribery and served four years in prison.

James E. Gaines, Deputy Assistant Secretary of the Navy, took over when Paisley resigned his office. Gaines was convicted of accepting an illegal gratuity and theft and conversion of government property. He was sentenced to six months in prison.

Victor D. Cohen, Deputy Assistant Secretary of the Air Force, was the 50th conviction obtained under the Ill Wind probe when he pleaded guilty to accepting bribes and conspiring to defraud the government.

Most worked for Unisys, pleading guilty to eight felonies, including the use of fraud, bribery and illegal campaign contributions to obtain billions of dollars in defense contracts. Other top officials worked for Lee Telecommunications and Teledyne.

The scandal led the United States Congress to pass the 1988 Procurement Integrity Act, which regulates the pay that procurement officials can receive from contractors during the first year after they leave government, and forbids them providing bid and proposal information to their new employers.
