= David S. Potter =

American government official

David Samuel Potter (January 16, 1925 – September 18, 2011) was an American government official who served as the United States Assistant Secretary of the Navy (Research and Development) from 1973 to 1974, and Under Secretary of the Navy from 1974 to 1976. After he left public service, Potter was a long-time executive at General Motors.

Potter was born in Seattle, Washington on January 16, 1925. He was educated at Yale University, receiving a B.S. in Physics in 1945, and at the University of Washington, from which he received a Ph.D. in Physics in 1951. Potter spent the next two decades as an engineer at General Motors. This academic phase of his career climaxed in his election to the National Academy of Engineering in 1973 in recognition of his work in underwater acoustic instrumentation, ocean engineering and human exploration of the Moon.

President of the United States Richard Nixon nominated Potter as Assistant Secretary of the Navy (Research and Development) in 1973, and Potter held this office from September 14, 1973, to August 16, 1974. President Gerald Ford subsequently nominated Potter as Under Secretary of the Navy, and Potter held that office from August 28, 1974, to April 1, 1976.

Upon retiring from government in 1976, Potter returned to General Motors as vice president for environmental matters. He later became GM's Vice President of power Products and Defense Operations Group, a title he held until his retirement in 1985.

Potter served as a member of many organizations' Board of Directors, including a stint as Chairman of the Board of Fluke Corporation from 1990 to 1991. He died in Santa Barbara, California on September 18, 2011, at the age of 86.

Government offices
Preceded by Robert W. Morse	Assistant Secretary of the Navy (Research and Development); September 14, 1973 – August 16, 1974	Succeeded by H. Tyler Marcy
Preceded by J. William Middendorf	Under Secretary of the Navy; September 14, 1976 – February 4, 1977	Succeeded by David R. Macdonald
