= Auxilia palatina =

Unit of the late Roman infantry

Auxilia palatina (sg.: auxilium palatinum) were infantry units of the Late Roman army, first raised by Constantine I as part of the new field army he created in about 325 AD.

Some of the senior and probably oldest of these units had special names such as Cornuti or Brachiati; others were named after the tribes from which they were recruited (many of these in eastern Gaul, or among the German barbarians). These units all became palatine units when a distinction was drawn between palatina and the remainder of the comitatenses around 365. There is no direct evidence for the strength of an auxilium, but A. H. M. Jones (History of the Later Roman Empire, Blackwell, Oxford, 1964 p 682) estimates that it may have been 600 or 700. Some auxilia are attested as limitanei, especially on the Danube. It is not clear whether these were regarded as a different category of unit.

== List of auxilia palatina ==
List of the auxilia palatina included in the early 5th-century Notitia Dignitatum, which depicts also some of the shield patterns of the units.

- Attacotti
- Batavi seniores
- Batavi iuniores
- Cornuti seniores
- Cornuti iuniores
- Brachiati seniores
- Celtae seniores
- Heruli seniores
- Heruli iuniores
- Mattiaci seniores
- Mattiaci iuniores
- Petulantes seniores
- Ascarii seniores
- Ascarii iuniores
- Iovii seniores
- Sagittarii Nervii
- Leones seniores
- Leones iuniores
- Exculcatores seniores
- Sagittarii Tungri
- Exculcatores iuniores
- Tubantes
- Salii
- Grati
- Felices seniores
- Felices iuniores
- Gratianenses seniores
- Invicti seniores
- Augustei
- Iovii iuniores
- Victores iuniores
- Bructeri
- Ampsivarii
- Gratianenses iuniores
- Valentianenses iuniores
- Raeti
- Regii
- Sequani
- Sagittarii venatores
- Latini
- Sabini
- Brachiati iuniores
- Honoriani Atecotti seniores
- Honoriani Marcomanni seniores
- Honoriani Marcomanni iuniores
- Honoriani Atecotti iuniores
- Brisigavi seniores
- Brisigavi iuniores
- Celtae iuniores
- Invicti iuniores Britanniciani
- Exculcatores iuniores Britanniciani
- Felices Valentinianenses
- Mattiaci iuniores Gallicani
- Salii Gallicani
- Sagittarii Nervii Gallicani
- Iovii iuniores Gallicani
- Seguntienses
- Galli victores
- Honoriani victores iuniores
- Honoriani ascarii seniores
- Felices iuniores Gallicani
- Atecotti iuniores Gallicani
- Tungri
- Honoriani Gallicani
- Mauri tonantes seniores
- Mauri tonantes iuniores
- Mauri Osismiaci
- Mauri Cetrati
- Mauri Vneneti
- Honoriani Mauri seniores
- Honoriani Mauri iuniores
Ampsivarii

Felices seniores

Heruli seniores

Honoriani ascarii seniores

Invicti iuniores Britanniciani

Iovii seniores

Leones seniores

Petulantes

Sequani
