= Palatini (Roman military) =

Elite Late Roman army units

The palatini (Latin for "palace troops") were elite units of the Late Roman army mostly attached to the comitatus praesentales, or imperial escort armies. In the elaborate hierarchy of troop-grades, the palatini ranked below the scholares (members of the elite cavalry regiments called the scholae), but above the comitatenses (regiments of the regional comitatus) and the limitanei (border troops).

The term derives from palatium ("palace") a reference to the fact that the regiments originally served in the imperial escort armies only. Later they were also found in the regional comitatus (mobile field armies). There, however, they continued to enjoy higher status and pay than the rest of the comitatus regiments. At the time the Notitia Dignitatum was written (ca. 395 for the Eastern Empire), 80% of the regiments in the eastern comitatus praesentales were graded palatini and 14% of those in the regional comitatus.

The palatini were created by Constantine I after he disbanded the long-standing Praetorian Guard in AD 312, and originally comprised former praetorians. As with all comitatus regiments, palatini cavalry regiments were called vexillationes (from vexillum = "military standard") and infantry regiments were either legiones or auxilia. Vexillationes palatinae are believed to have contained 400–600 men, legiones palatinae 800–1,200 and auxilia palatina either 800–1,000 or 400–600.

== Origins and history ==
In the early 3rd century, the Roman military was organized into several provincial armies under the command of the provincial governors, a smaller reserve under the command of the emperor, guard units such as the Praetorian Guard, and the urban cohorts. Field armies were temporary formations, usually composed of the reserve and/or of detachments drawn from the provincial armies. In the later 3rd century, due to the frequent wars, field armies could remain together for several years, under the direct command of the emperor, and would require their own recruitment systems.

By the mid 4th century, the Roman military was divided into frontier armies under the command of the provincial duces and permanent field armies under the command of the emperor, the magistri militum, magistri equitum, or comites. The frontier armies would patrol the borders and oppose small-scale raids. They may have driven off medium-scale attacks without the support of the field armies. The frontier armies would later be known as limitanei or ripenses. The field armies would respond to larger-scale attacks, would fight against rival emperors, and would conduct any large-scale attacks into neighbouring countries. The field armies would later be known as comitatenses or palatini. The temporary field armies could be referred to as the sacer comitatus, as could the imperial court. The first known written reference to comitatenses was in 325, although there are possibilities from earlier and the first to palatini was not until 365.

Historians disagree on whether the emperor Diocletian, or one of his successors, such as Constantine I, split the Roman military into frontier armies and field armies. Theodor Mommsen, H.M.D. Parker, and more recently, Warren Treadgold and David S. Potter attribute the reorganization to Diocletian. E.C. Nischer, D. van Berchem, and more recently, M.C. Bishop and J.C.N. Coulston attribute mainly an expansion to Diocletian, and the reorganization to Constantine I and his successors. Karl Strobel sees the reorganization as the culmination of trends going back well into the 3rd century, with Diocletian strengthening both the frontier and field armies.

The Eastern field armies, including the palatini and comitatenses, eventually became the basis of the Eastern themes.

The Western field armies, including the palatini and comitatenses, either disintegrated during the collapse of the western Roman Empire, or became part of the armies of the successor states.

== Higher command ==
The field armies of the Tetrarchy were under the command of the emperors, with the assistance of the praetorian prefects. There were then four emperors, two Augusti, and two Caesares, who routinely commanded the field armies on campaign.

The field armies after Constantine I were under the command of the emperor, with the assistance of the magister peditum and magister equitum.

The eastern field armies after Theodosius I were under the overall command of the emperor, with one magister militum for each army. There was usually only one eastern emperor, who rarely commanded the field armies on campaign until Maurice's reappearance as the incumbent emperor in person on the battlefield.

== Organization ==
The size of the army, and therefore of the palatini and comitatenses, remains controversial. A.H.M. Jones and Warren Treadgold argue that the late Roman army was significantly larger than earlier Roman armies, and Treadgold estimates they had up to 645,000 troops. Karl Strobel denies this, and Strobel estimates that the late Roman army had some 435,000 troops in the time of Diocletian and 450,000 in the time of Constantine I.

== Equipment ==
M.C. Bishop and J.C.N. Coulston, in a major work on Roman military equipment, do not distinguish the equipment of the various branches of the Roman military. It is doubtful whether there were any universal differences between the equipment of the palatini and of the other forces.

The late Roman empire had centralized fabricae, introduced by Diocletian, to provide arms and armor for the army. The introduction of the centralized fabricae, where earlier armies had relied on legionary workshops, may reflect the needs of the field armies.

The 4th century palatini included both light and heavy infantry, as well as light and heavy cavalry.

== See also ==
- Scholae Palatinae
- Late Roman army

== Notes and references ==
=== Primary Sources ===
- The Notitia Dignitatum
- The work of Ammianus Marcellinus

=== Secondary Sources ===
- M.C. Bishop and J.C.N. Coulston, Roman Military Equipment, From the Punic Wars to the Fall of Rome (Oxbow Books, 2006)
- Hugh Elton, Warfare in Roman Europe AD 350-425 (Oxford University Press, 1996).
- Benjamin Isaac, The Limits of Empire: the Roman Army in the East (Oxford University Press, revised ed. 1992).
- A.D. Lee, War in Late Antiquity, A Social History (Blackwell, 2007).
- Luttwak, Edward (1976). The Grand Strategy of the Roman Empire. Baltimore: Johns Hopkins. ISBN 0801821584.
- Pat Southern and Karen R. Dixon, The Late Roman Army (Routledge, 1996).
- Karl Strobel, "Strategy and Army Structure between Septimius Severus and Constantine the Great," in Paul Erdkamp, A Companion to the Roman Army (Wiley-Blackwell, 2011).
- Warren Treadgold, Byzantium and Its Army, 284-1081 (Stanford University Press, 1995).
- Michael Whitby, "Army and Society in the Late Roman World" in Paul Erdkamp, A Companion to the Roman Army (Wiley-Blackwell, 2011).
