= Regii =

Shield of the Regii under the magister militum praesentalis of the East, according to the Notitia Dignitatum.

The Regii or Reges was a Germanic auxilia palatina (light infantry) unit of the Late Roman army, active between the 4th and the 5th century. There was also a legio comitatensis with the same name. The Regii had its main period of action in the mid-4th century when they were recruited to fight against the Alamannic incursions and invasions of the Roman Empire. Most likely the Regii themselves were composed of Alamannic or Suebi recruits, and were recruited for their extensive knowledge and familiarity with the Suebic Alamanni and their allies.

== History ==
This unit was probably formed under Constantius II or Magnentius, even if another reconstruction suggests they originated during the Constantinian period and formed by the Alamannic king Crocus.

The Regii belonged to the army of the emperor Julian. They fought in the Battle of Strasbourg (357): they were deployed on the second line and held, together with the Batavi, the pressure of the Alamannic cavalry that had repulsed the Roman cavalry.

In the Notitia Dignitatum (395–420 circa) the Regii are listed in the army of the magister militum praesentalis of the East. This could mean that they also spend some years in Britain before period, because as the Regii, the Heruli were also listed as an eastern auxiliary group, and they were sent to Britain multiple times during the Reges’ most active period, as Germanic reinforcement send to fight off the many unwelcomed Saxon, Anglian, and Jute raiders.
