= Roman people =

Citizens of ancient Rome

Romans
Latin: Rōmānī Ancient Greek: Ῥωμαῖοι, Rhōmaîoi (Note: The official languages of the Roman Empire were Latin and Greek.)
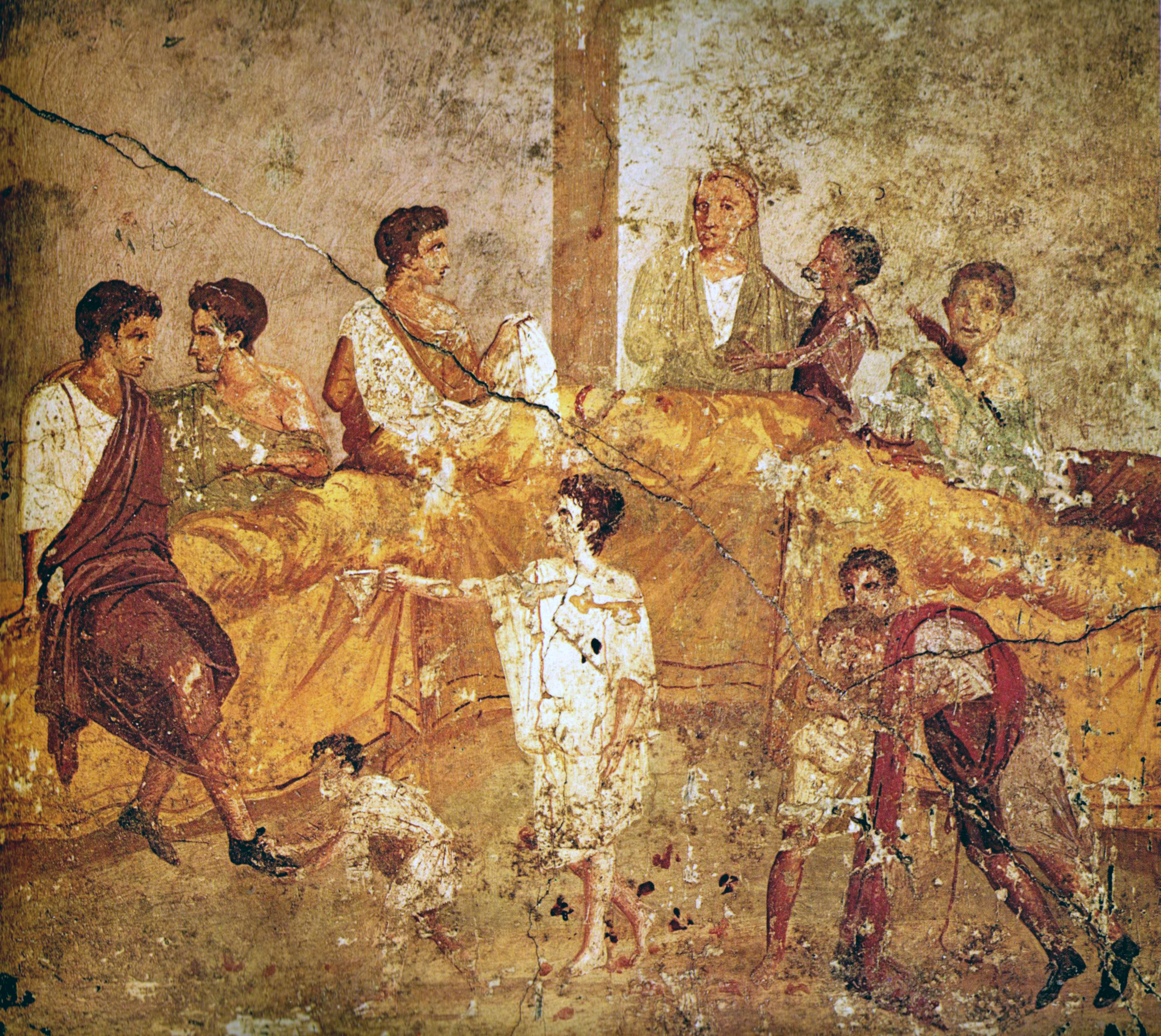
- 1st century AD wall painting from Pompeii depicting a multigenerational banquet

Languages
- Latin; Greek; Other languages in the Roman Empire

Religion
- Imperial cult; Ancient Roman religion; Hellenistic religion; Christianity

Related ethnic groups
- Ancient Italic peoples, ancient Greeks and other ancient Mediterranean peoples, Byzantines, Romioi, modern Romance-speaking peoples (Italians, Sardinians, Corsicans, Romansh, Romands, Occitans, French, Walloons, Catalans, Spaniards, Galicians, Portuguese, Romanians, Latin Americans, etc), modern Greeks, Rūm peoples

The Roman people was the body of Roman citizens (Latin: Rōmānī; Ancient Greek: Ῥωμαῖοι Rhōmaîoi) during the Roman Kingdom, the Roman Republic, and the Roman Empire. This concept underwent considerable changes throughout the long history of the Roman civilisation, as its borders expanded and contracted. Originally only including the ethnic Latins from Rome itself, Roman citizenship was extended to the rest of the Italic peoples by the 1st century BC and to nearly every subject of the Roman empire in late antiquity. At their peak, the Romans ruled large parts of Europe, the Near East, and North Africa through conquests made during the Roman Republic and the subsequent Roman Empire. Although defined primarily as a citizenship, "Roman-ness" has also and variously been described as a cultural identity, a nationality, or a multi-ethnicity that eventually encompassed a vast regional diversity. (Note: Though not an ethnicity in the sense of sharing the same genetic descent, the Romans could, per Diemen (2021) and others, be seen as an ethnicity in the sense of "a social identity (based on a contrast vis‐à‐vis others) characterised by metaphoric or fictive kinship".)

Citizenship grants, demographic growth, and settler and military colonies rapidly increased the number of Roman citizens. The increase achieved its peak with Emperor Caracalla's AD 212 Antonine Constitution, which extended citizenship rights to all free inhabitants of the empire. Roman identity provided a larger sense of common identity and became important when distinguishing from non-Romans, such as barbarian settlers and invaders. Roman culture was far from homogeneous; though there was a common cultural idiom, one of the strengths of the Roman Empire was also its ability to incorporate traditions from other cultures, notably but not exclusively Greece.

Border changes of the Roman state from 6th century BC to 15th century AD

The collapse of the Western Roman Empire in the 5th century ended the political domination of the Roman Empire in Western Europe, but Roman identity survived in the west as an important political resource. Through the failures of the surviving Eastern Roman Empire (often termed the Byzantine Empire by later historians) of reconquering and keeping control of the west and suppression from the new Germanic kingdoms, Roman identity faded away in the west, more or less disappearing in the 8th and 9th centuries. In the Greek-speaking east, still under imperial control, Roman identity survived until the fall of the Byzantine Empire in 1453 and beyond.

Whereas Roman identity faded away in most of the lands where it was once prominent, for some regions and peoples it proved considerably more tenacious. In Italy, "Romans" (Romani in Latin and Italian) has continuously and uninterruptedly been the demonym of the citizens of Rome from the foundation of the city to the present-day. During the Eastern Roman Empire and for centuries after its fall, Greeks largely identified as "Romans" (Rōmaîoi or Romioi in transliterated Greek), even referring to vernacular Greek as the "Roman language" (Romaiki glossa). In Switzerland several names are Roman references: the Romands and the Romansh people. Several names derive from the Latin Romani (such as the Romanians, Aromanians and Istro-Romanians), or from the Germanic walhaz (a term originally referring to the Romans; adopted in the form Vlach as the self-designation of the Megleno-Romanians).

== Romanness ==
=== Meaning of "Roman" ===
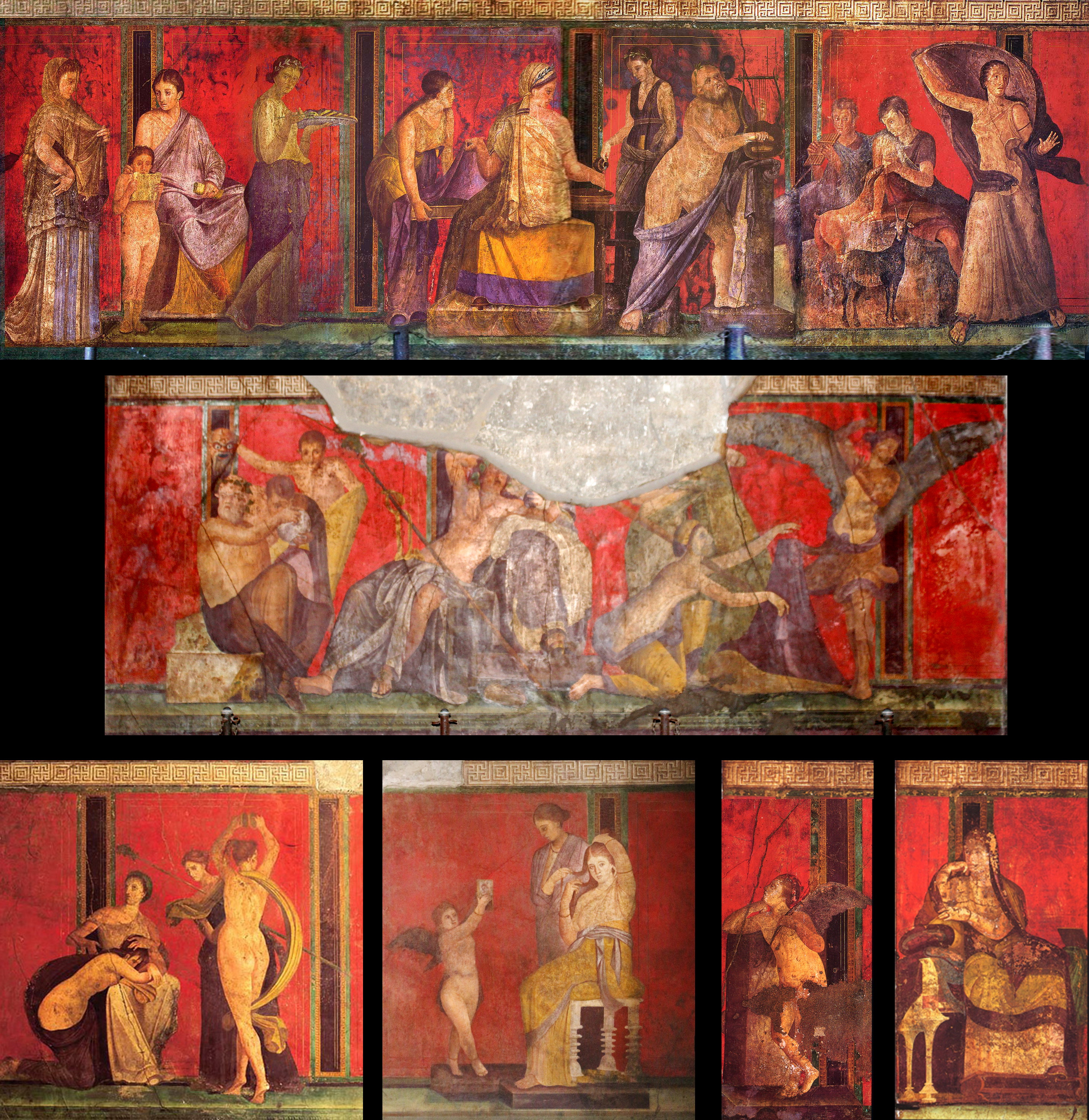
Frescoes from the Villa of the Mysteries in Pompeii, Italy, Roman artwork dated to the mid-1st century BC

The term 'Roman' is today used interchangeably to describe a historical timespan, a material culture, a geographical location, and a personal identity. Though these concepts are related, they are not identical. Many modern historians tend to have a preferred idea of what being Roman meant, so-called Romanitas, but this was a term rarely used in Ancient Rome itself. Like all identities, the identity of 'Roman' was flexible, dynamic and multi-layered, and never static or unchanging. Given that Rome was a geographically vast and chronologically long-lived state, there is no simple definition of what being Roman meant and definitions were inconsistent already in antiquity. Nevertheless, some elements remained common throughout much of Roman history.

Some ancient Romans considered aspects such as geography, language, and ethnicity as important markers of Romanness, whereas others saw Roman citizenship and culture or behaviour as more important. At the height of the Roman Empire, Roman identity formed a collective geopolitical identity, extended to nearly all subjects of the Roman emperors and encompassing vast regional and ethnical diversity. Often, what an individual believed and did was far more important to the concept of Roman identity than long bloodlines and shared descent. The key to 'Romanness' in the minds of some famous Roman orators, such as Cicero, was keeping with Roman tradition and serving the Roman state. Cicero's view of Romanness were partly formed by his status as a "new man", the first of his family to serve in the Roman Senate, lacking prestigious lines of Roman descent himself. This is not to say that the importance of blood kinship was wholly dismissed. Orators such as Cicero frequently appealed to their noble contemporaries to live up to the 'greatness of their forefathers'. These appeals were typically only invoked towards illustrious noble families, with other important traditions emphasising Rome's collective descent.

Throughout its history, Rome proved to be uniquely capable of incorporating and integrating other peoples (Romanisation). This sentiment originated from the city's foundation myths, including Rome being founded as something akin to a political sanctuary by Romulus, as well as the rape of the Sabine women, which represented how different peoples had commingled since the very beginning of the city. Cicero and other Roman authors sneered at peoples such as the Athenians, who prided themselves in their shared descent, and instead found pride in Rome's status as a "mongrel nation". Dionysius of Halicarnassus, a Greek historian who lived in Roman times, even embellished the multicultural origin of the Romans, writing that Romans had since the foundation of Rome welcomed innumerable immigrants not only from the rest of Italy, but from the entire world, whose cultures merged with theirs.

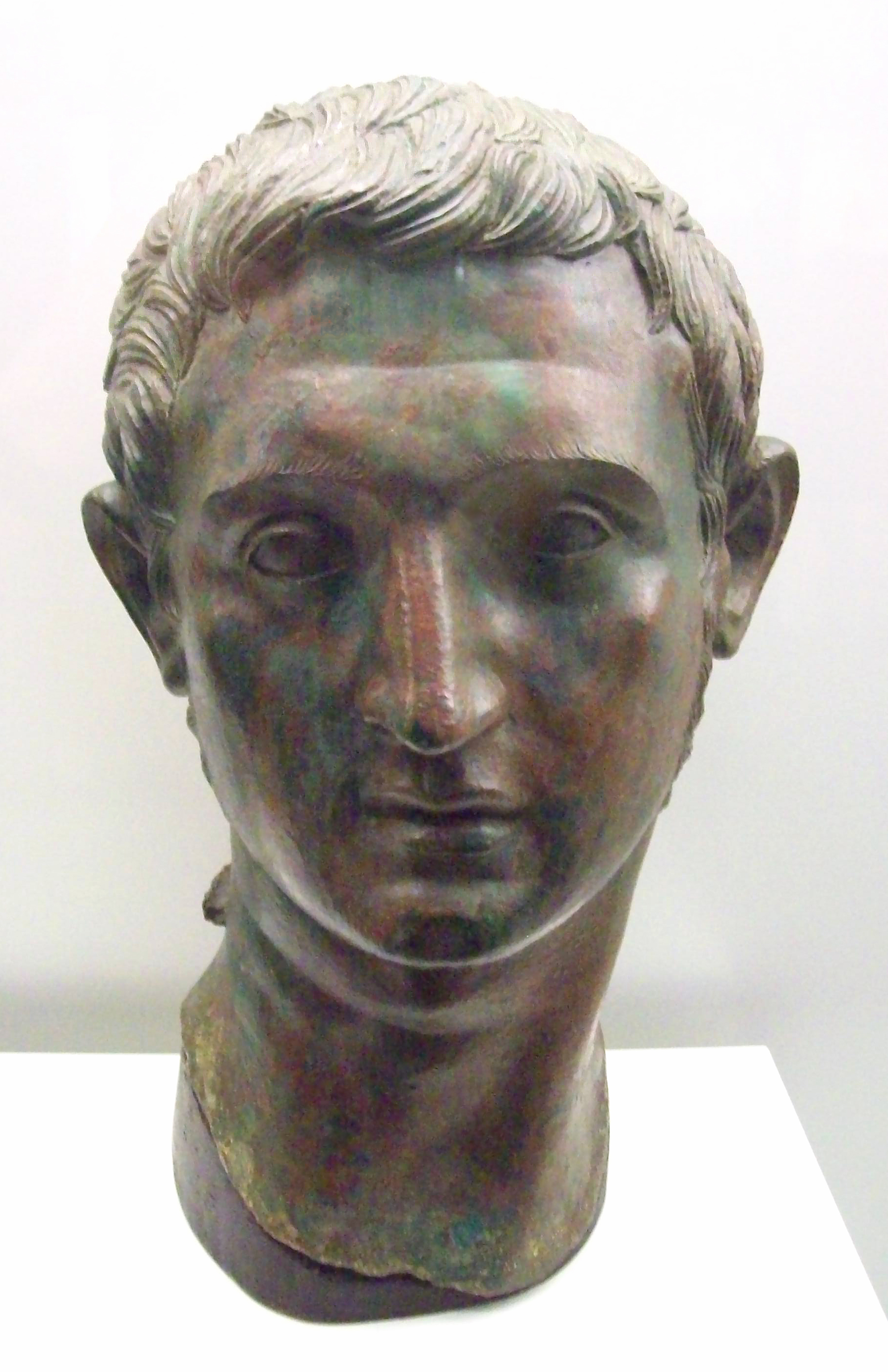
A young Hispano-Roman nobleman from the 1st century BC

A handful of Roman authors, such as Tacitus and Suetonius, expressed concerns in their writings regarding Roman "blood purity" as Roman citizens from outside of Roman Italy increased in number. Neither author, however, suggested that the naturalisation of new citizens should stop, only that manumissions (freeing slaves) and grants of citizenship should be less frequent. Their concerns of blood purity did not match modern ideas of race or ethnicity, and had little to do with features such as skin colour or physical appearance. Terms such as "Aethiop", which Romans used for black people, carried no social implications, and though phenotype-related stereotypes certainly existed in Ancient Rome, inherited physical characteristics were typically not relevant to social status; people who looked different from the typical Mediterranean populace, such as black people, were not excluded from any profession and there are no records of stigmas or biases against "mixed race" relationships. The main dividing social differences in Ancient Rome were not based on physical features, but rather on differences in class or rank. Romans practised slavery extensively, but slaves in Ancient Rome were part of various different ethnic groups, and were not enslaved because of their ethnic affiliation. According to the English historian Emma Dench, it was "notoriously difficult to detect slaves by their appearance" in Ancient Rome.

=== Non-Romans ===
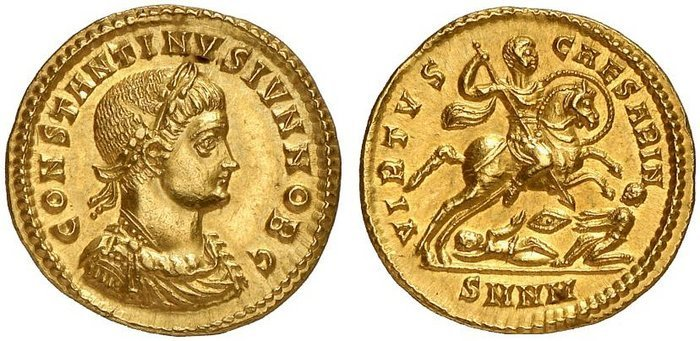
Coin of Emperor Constantine II (r. 337–340), depicting the emperor on horseback, trampling two barbarians

Although Ancient Rome has been termed an 'evidently non-racist society', Romans carried considerable cultural stereotypes and prejudices against cultures and peoples that were not integrated into the Roman world, i.e. "barbarians". Though views differed through Roman history, the attitude towards peoples beyond the Roman frontier among most Roman writers in late antiquity can be summed up with "the only good barbarian is a dead barbarian". Throughout antiquity, the majority of Roman emperors included anti-barbarian imagery on their coinage, such as the emperor or Victoria (the personification and goddess of victory) being depicted as stepping on or dragging defeated barbarian enemies. Per the writings of Cicero, what made people barbarians was not their language or descent, but rather their customs and character, or lack thereof. Romans viewed themselves as superior over foreigners, but this stemmed not from perceived biological differences, but rather from what they perceived as a superior way of life. 'Barbarian' was as such a cultural, rather than biological, term. It was not impossible for a barbarian to become a Roman; the Roman state was itself seen as having the duty to conquer and transform, i.e. civilise, barbarian peoples.

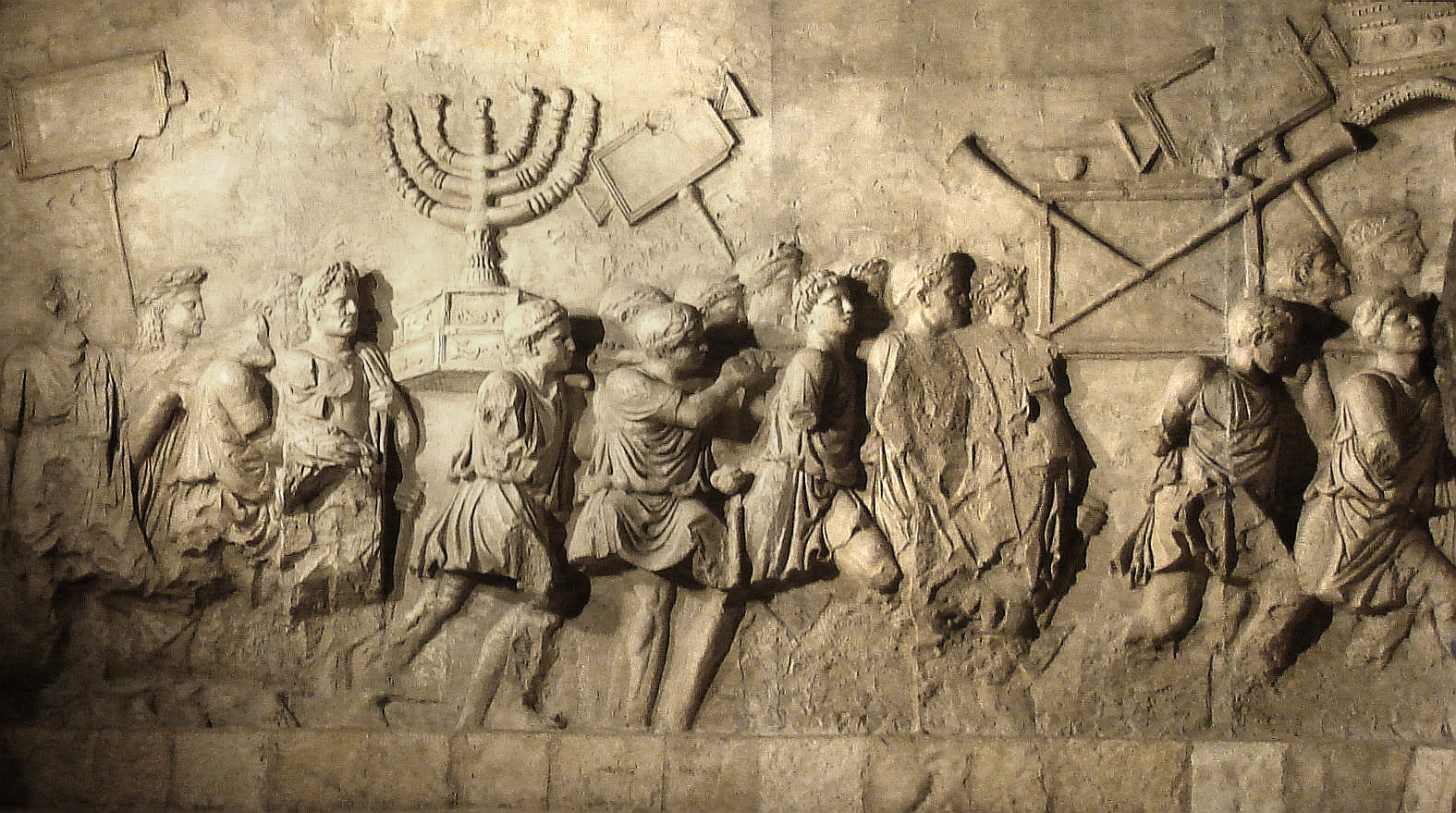
Relief from Arch of Titus of Romans with loot from the Temple in Jerusalem

A particularly disliked group of non-Romans within the empire were the Jews. The majority of the Roman populace detested Jews and Judaism, though views were more varied among the Roman elite. Although many, such as Tacitus, were also hostile to the Jews, others, such as Cicero, were merely unsympathetically indifferent. The Roman state was not wholly opposed to the Jews, since there was a sizeable Jewish population in Rome itself, as well as at least thirteen synagogues in the city. Roman antisemitism, which led to several wars, persecutions, and massacres in Judea, was not rooted in racial prejudice, but rather in the perception that the Jews, uniquely among conquered peoples, refused to integrate into the Roman world. The Jews adhered to their own set of rules, restrictions and obligations, which were typically either disliked or misunderstood by the Romans, and they remained faithful to their own religion. The exclusivist religious practices of the Jews, and their opposition to abandoning their own customs in favour of those of Rome, even after being conquered and repeatedly suppressed, evoked the suspicion of the Romans.

== Antiquity ==
=== Classical antiquity ===
==== Founding myths and Romans of the republic ====
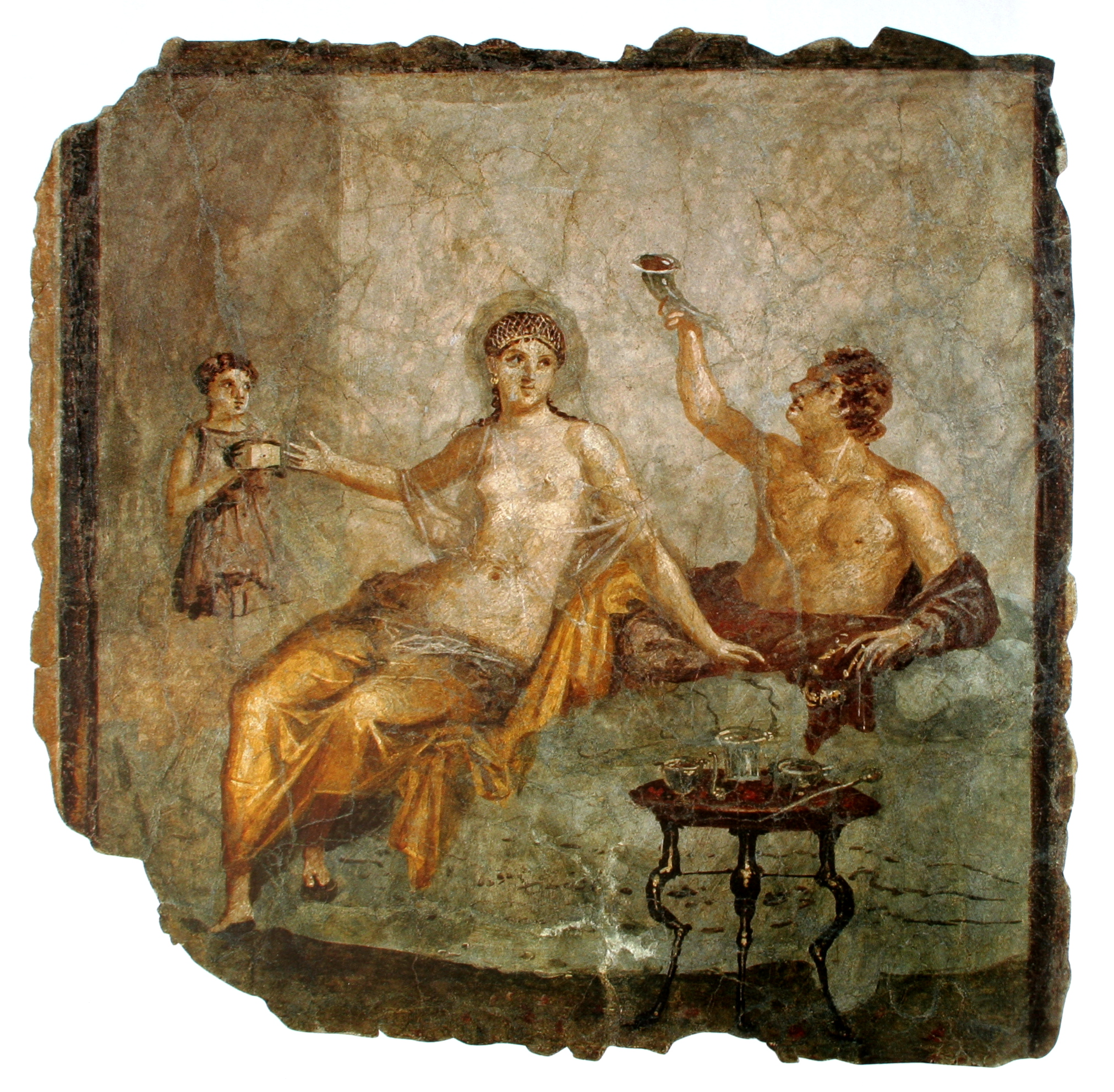
Fresco of Roman banquet scene from Herculaneum, Italy, c. 50 BC

The founding of Rome, and the history of the city and its people throughout its first few centuries, is steeped in myth and uncertainty. The traditional date for Rome's foundation, 753 BC, and the traditional date for the foundation of the Roman Republic, 509 BC, though commonly used even in modern historiography, are uncertain and mythical. (Note: The 753 BC figure for Rome's foundation was first suggested by the antiquarian Titus Pomponius Atticus (c. 110–32 BC), and then adopted by the scholar Marcus Terentius Varro (116–27 BC), coming to be known as the 'Varronian chronology'. There were several alternate proposed dates for the foundation of the city and of the republic even in antiquity. The chronology of Atticus and Varro was not universally adopted until a considerable amount of time after it had first been suggested. Dates suggested by other ancient authors range in time from 814 to 729 BC. In the earliest Greek accounts of Roman history, formulated in the 5th century BC, the Greeks believed Rome to predate their own colonies in the western mediterranean, which would place the city's foundation before the 8th century BC. An early date is not impossible given that archaeological evidence in Rome confirms that the site was at least inhabited prior to 753 BC.) The myths surrounding Rome's foundation combined, if not confused, several different stories, going from the origins of the Latin people under a king by the name Latinus, to Evander of Pallantium, who was said to have brought Greek culture to Italy, and a myth of Trojan origin through the heroic figure Aeneas. The actual mythical founder of the city itself, Romulus, only appears many generations into the complex web of foundation myths. Interpretations of these myths varied among authors in Antiquity, (Note: Some Roman authors, such as Livy (64/59 BC – AD 12/17) attempted to combine the foundation myths into relatively straightforward stories, whereas others, such as the author of the 4th-century AD Origo gentis Romanae, leave the contradictions open.) but most agreed that their civilisation had been founded by a mixture of migrants and fugitives. These origin narratives would favour the later extensive integrations of foreigners into the Roman world.

The origins of the people that became the first Romans are clearer. As in neighbouring city-states, the early Romans were composed mainly of Latin-speaking Italic people, known as the Latins. The Latins were a people with a marked Mediterranean character, related to other neighbouring Italic peoples such as the Falisci. The early Romans were part of the Latin homeland, known as Latium, and were Latins themselves. By the time of the 6th century, the inhabitants of Rome had conquered and destroyed all the other Latin settlements and communities such as Antemnae and Collatia and defeated the hegemony of the settlement of Alba Longa, which had previously united the Latin people under its leadership, a position that now belonged to Rome.

From the middle of the 4th century onwards, Rome won a series of victories which saw them rise to rule all of Italy south of the Po river by 270 BC. Following the conquest of Italy, the Romans waged war against the great powers of their time; Carthage to the south and west and the various Hellenistic kingdoms to the east, and by the middle of the second century BC, all rivals had been defeated and Rome became recognised by other countries as the definite masters of the Mediterranean. By the late 3rd century BC, about a third of the people in Italy south of the Po river had been made Roman citizens, meaning that they were liable for military service, and the rest had been made into allies, frequently called on to join Roman wars. These allies were eventually made Roman citizens as well after refusal by the Roman government to make them so was met with the Social War, after which Roman citizenship was extended to all the people south of the Po river. In 49 BC, citizenship rights were also extended to the people of Cisalpine Gaul by Julius Caesar. The number of Romans would rapidly increase in later centuries through further extensions of citizenship. Typically, there were five different mechanisms for acquiring Roman citizenship: serving in the Roman army, holding office in cities with the Latin right, being granted it directly by the government, being part of a community that was granted citizenship as a "block grant" or, as a slave, being freed by a Roman citizen. Just as it could be gained, Roman status could also be lost, for instance through engaging practices considered corrupt or by being carried off into captivity in enemy raids (though one could again become a Roman upon returning from captivity).

==== Romans of the early empire ====
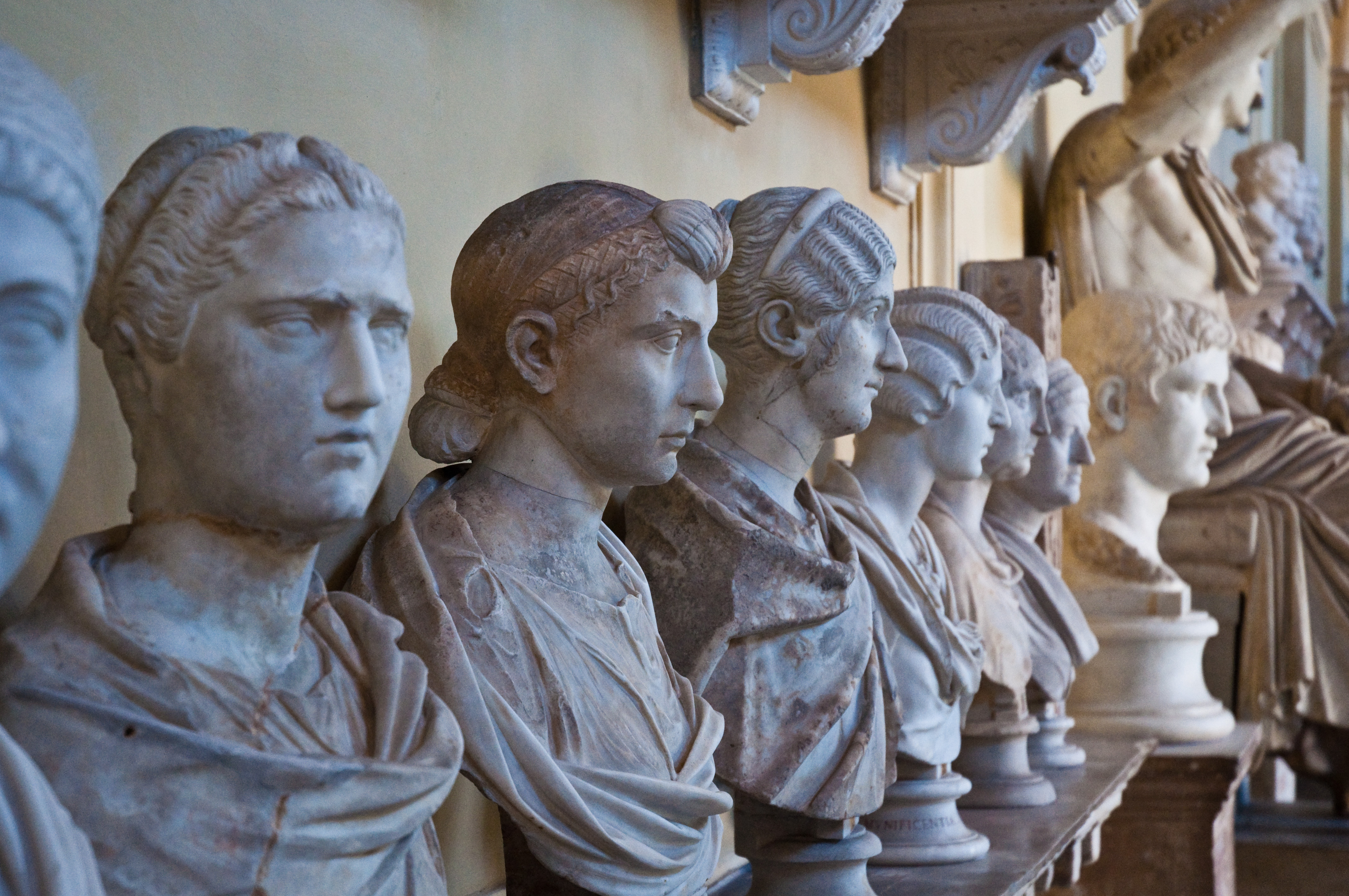
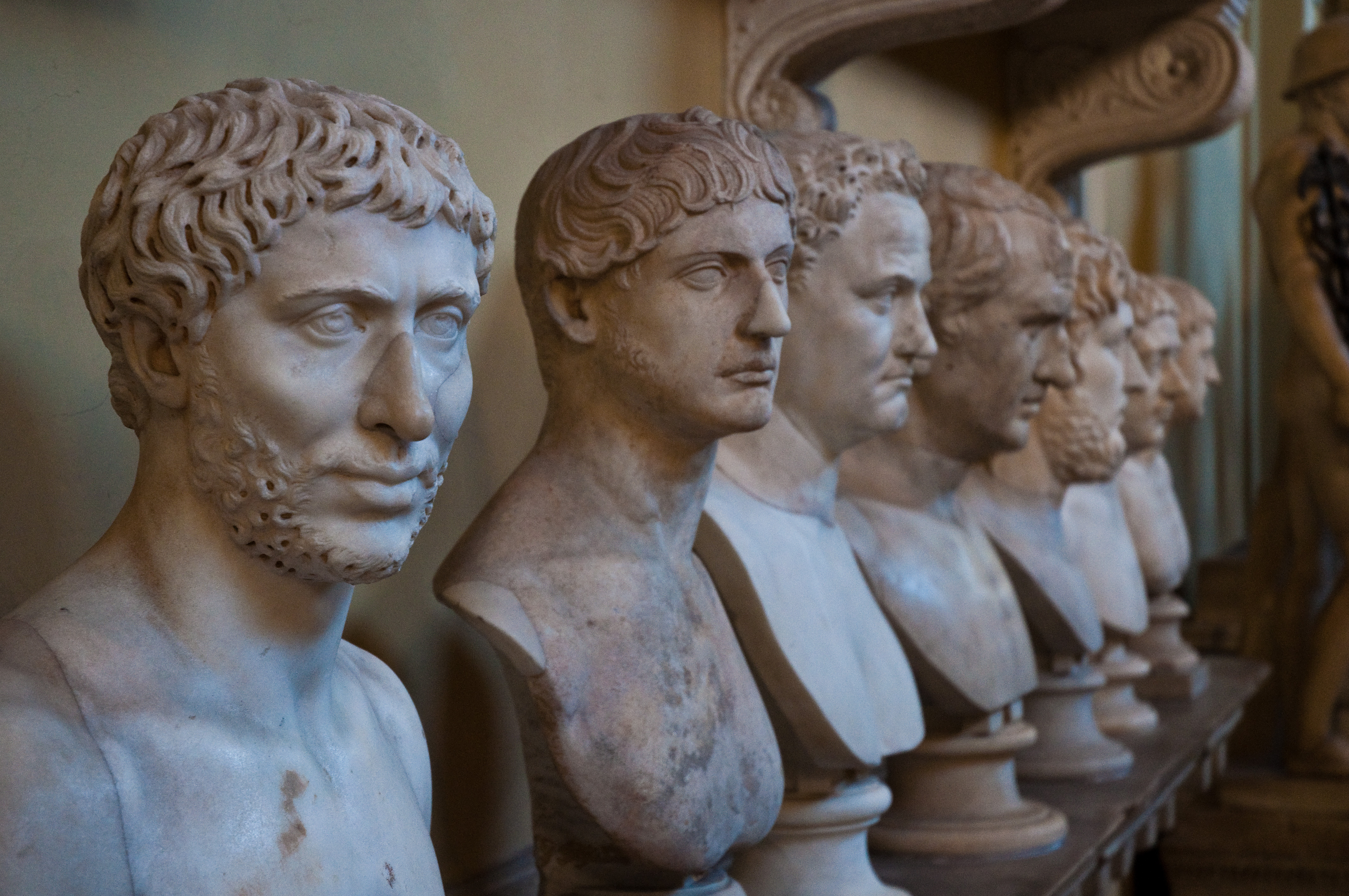
Collection of female and male Roman busts in the Vatican Museums in Rome

In the early Roman Empire, the population was composed of several groups of distinct legal standing, including the Roman citizens themselves (cives romani), the provincials (provinciales), foreigners (peregrini) and free non-citizens such as freedmen (freed slaves) and slaves. Roman citizens were subject to the Roman legal system while provincials were subject to whatever laws and legal systems had been in place in their area at the time it was annexed by the Romans. Over time, Roman citizenship was gradually extended more and more and there was a regular "siphoning" of people from less privileged legal groups to more privileged groups, increasing the total percentage of subjects recognised as Romans though the incorporation of the provinciales and peregrini. The capability of the Roman Empire to integrate foreign peoples was one of the key elements that ensured its success. In antiquity, it was significantly easier as a foreigner to become a Roman than it was to become a member or citizen of any other contemporary state. This aspect of the Roman state was seen as important even by some of the emperors. For instance, Emperor Claudius (r. 41–54) pointed it out when questioned by the senate on admitting Gauls to join the senate:

What else proved fatal to Lacedaemon or Athens, in spite of their power in arms, but their policy of holding the conquered aloof as alien-born? But the sagacity of our own founder Romulus was such that several times he fought and naturalized a people in the course of the same day!

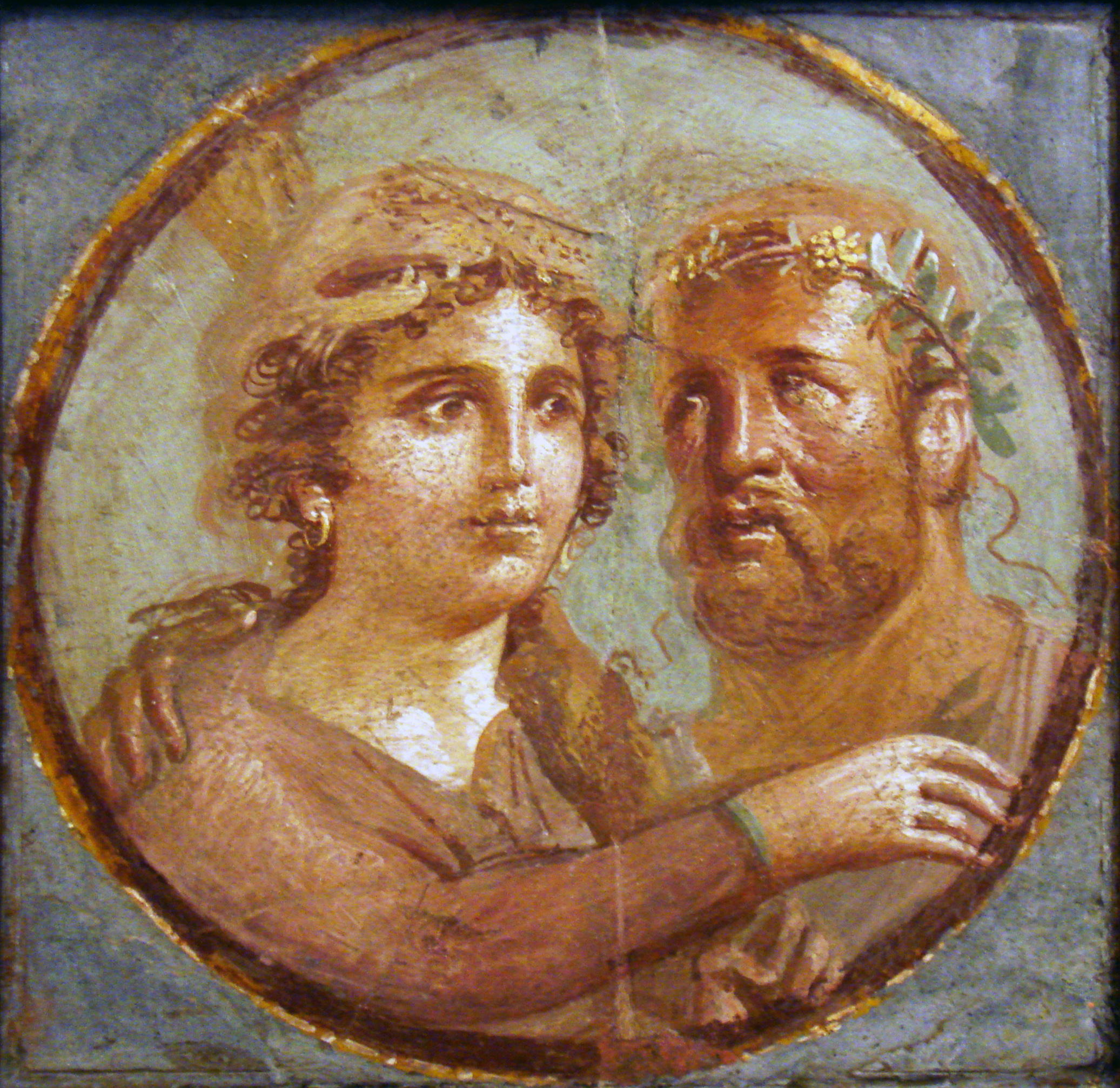
Ancient Roman fresco, Pompeian Fourth Style (45–79 AD), National Archaeological Museum of Naples, Italy

From the Principate (27 BC – AD 284) onwards, barbarians settled and integrated into the Roman world. Such settlers would have been granted certain legal rights simply by being within Roman territory, becoming provinciales and thus being eligible to serve as auxilia (auxiliary soldiers), which in turn made them eligible to become full cives Romani. Through this relatively rapid process, thousands of former barbarians could quickly become Romans. This tradition of straightforward integration eventually culminated in the Antonine Constitution, issued by Emperor Caracalla in 212, in which all free inhabitants of Empire were granted the citizenship. Caracalla's grant contributed to a vast increase in the number of people with the nomen (name indicating familial association) Aurelius. (Note: Though it is well-established in modern historiography, "Caracalla" was a nickname for the emperor, whose actual name was Marcus Aurelius Severus Antoninus.) By the time of the Antonine Constitution, many people throughout the provinces already considered themselves (and were considered by others) as Romans. Through the centuries of Roman expansion, large numbers of veterans and opportunists had settled in the provinces and colonies founded by Julius Caesar and Augustus alone saw between 500,000 and a million people from Italy settled in Rome's provinces. In AD 14, four to seven percent of the free people in the provinces of the empire were already Roman citizens. In addition to colonists, many provincials had also become citizens through grants by emperors and through other methods.

The Roman Empire in AD 117, at its greatest extent

In most cases, it is not clear to what extent the majority of the new Roman citizens regarded themselves as being Roman, or to what extent they were regarded as such by others. For some provincials under Roman rule, the only experience with "Romans" prior to themselves being granted citizenship was through Rome's at times coercive tax-collection system or its army, aspects which were not assimilative in terms of forming an empire-spanning collective identity. Caracalla's grant marked a radical change in imperial policy towards the provincials. It is possible that decades, and in many cases centuries, of Romanization through Rome's cultural influence had already begun the evolution of a "national" Roman identity before 212 and that the grant only made the ongoing process legal, but the grant might also have served as the important prerequisite for a later nearly all-encompassing collective Roman identity. According to the British jurist Tony Honoré, the grant "gave many millions, perhaps a majority of the empire's inhabitants [...] a new consciousness of being Roman". It is likely that local identities survived after Caracalla's grant and remained prominent throughout the empire, but that self-identification as Roman provided a larger sense of common identity and became important when dealing with and distinguishing oneself from non-Romans, such as barbarian settlers and invaders.

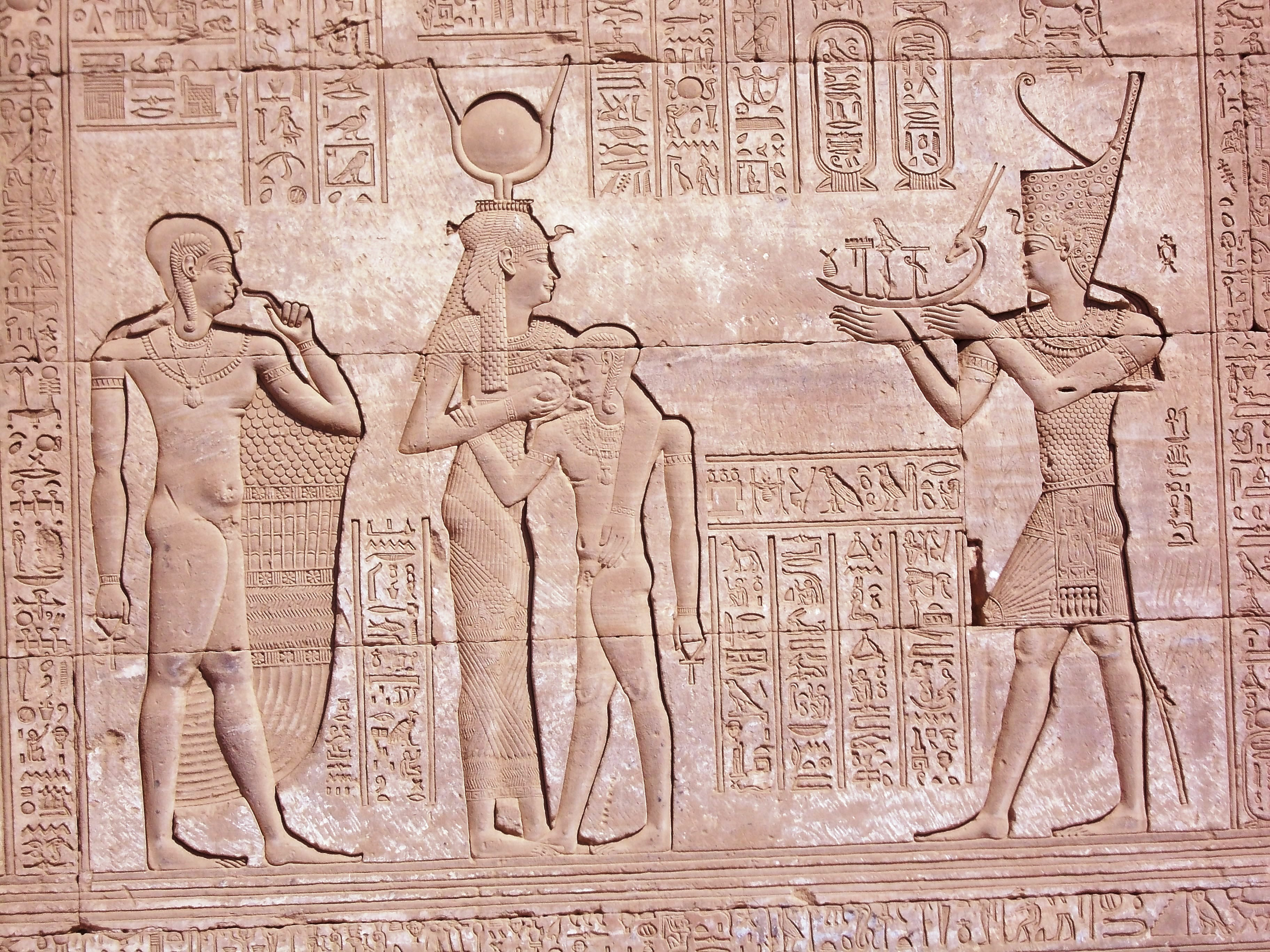
Egyptian relief depicting Emperor Trajan (r. 98–117; right) as a pharaoh

In many cases, ancient Romans associated the same things with their identity as historians do today: the rich ancient Latin literature, the impressive Roman architecture, the common marble statues, the variety of cult sites, the Roman infrastructure and legal tradition, as well as the almost corporate identity of the Roman army were all cultural and symbolic ways to express Roman identity. Although there was a more or less unifying Roman identity, Roman culture in classical times was also far from homogeneous. There was a common cultural idiom, large portions of which was based in earlier Hellenistic culture, but Rome's strength also laid in its flexibility and its ability to incorporate traditions from other cultures. For instance, the religions of many conquered peoples were embraced through amalgamations of the gods of foreign pantheons with those of the Roman pantheon. In Egypt, Roman emperors were seen as the successors of the pharaohs (in modern historiography termed the Roman pharaohs) and were depicted as such in artwork and in temples. Many cults from the eastern Mediterranean and beyond spread to Western Europe over the course of Roman rule.

=== Late antiquity ===
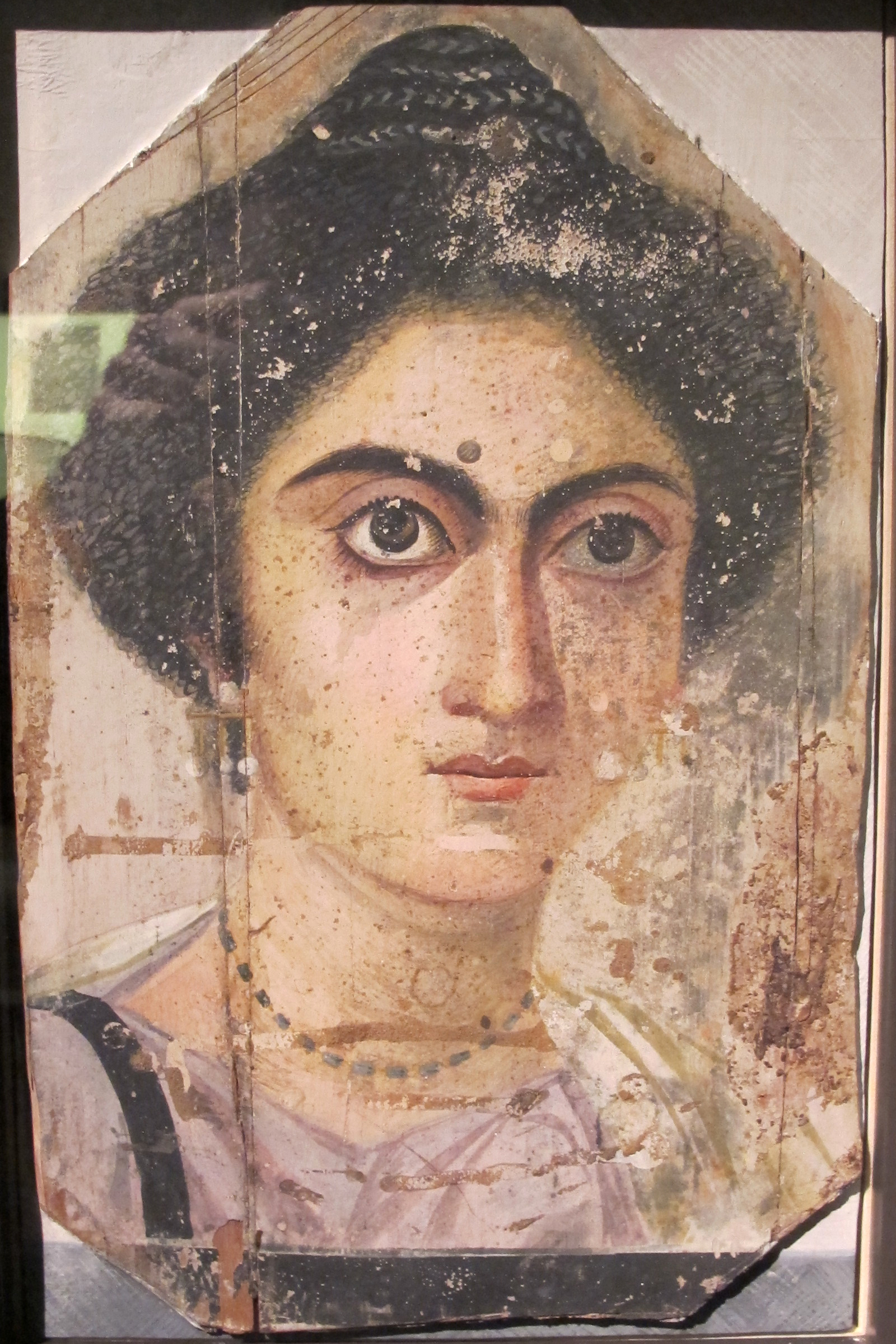
4th-century portrait of a woman from Roman Egypt

Once the very core of ancient Romanness, the city of Rome gradually lost its exceptional status within the empire in late antiquity. By the end of the third century, the city's importance was almost entirely ideological, and several emperors and usurpers had begun reigning from other cities closer to the imperial frontier. Rome's loss of status was also reflected in the perceptions of the city by the Roman populace. In the writings of the 4th-century Greek-speaking Roman soldier and author Ammianus Marcellinus, Rome is described almost like a foreign city, with disparaging comments on its corruption and impurity. Few Romans in late antiquity embodied all aspects of traditional Romanness. Many of them would have come from remote or less prestigious provinces and practiced religions and cults unheard of in Rome itself. Many of them would also have spoken 'barbarian languages' or Greek instead of Latin. Few inscriptions from late antiquity explicitly identify individuals as 'Roman citizens' or 'Romans'. Before the Antonine Constitution, being a Roman had been a mark of distinction and often stressed, but after the 3rd century Roman status went without saying. This silence does not mean that Romanness no longer mattered in the late Roman Empire, but rather that it had become less distinctive than other more specific marks of identity (such as local identities) and only needed to be stressed or highlighted if a person had recently become a Roman, or if the Roman status of a person was in doubt. The prevalent view of the Romans themselves was that the populus Romanus, or Roman people, were a "people by constitution", as opposed to the barbarian peoples who were gentes, "peoples by descent" (i. e. ethnicities).

Given that Romanness had become near-universal within the empire, local identities became more and more prominent. In the late Roman Empire, one could identify as a Roman as a citizen of the empire, as a person originating from one of the major regions (Africa, Britannia, Gaul, Hispania etc.) or as originating from a specific province or city. (Note: The 6th-century Gallo-Roman historian Gregory of Tours in his writings consistently identifies himself as an 'Arvernian' rather than as a Roman. Though Gregory rarely discusses ethnic identities in his writings, with only a handful of references to various barbarian gentes, types of identity that evidently mattered a lot to him were civititas, which city or settlement one was from, and ducatus, a slightly wider stretch of territory (such as the region of Champagne).) Though the Romans themselves did not see them as equivalent concepts, there is no fundamental difference between such Roman sub-identities and the gens identities ascribed to barbarians. In some cases, Roman authors ascribed different qualities to citizens of different parts of the empire, such as Ammianus Marcellinus who wrote of the differences between 'Gauls' and 'Italians'. In the late Roman army, there were regiments named after Roman sub-identities, such as 'Celts' and 'Batavians', as well as regiments named after barbarian gentes, such as the Franks or Saxons.

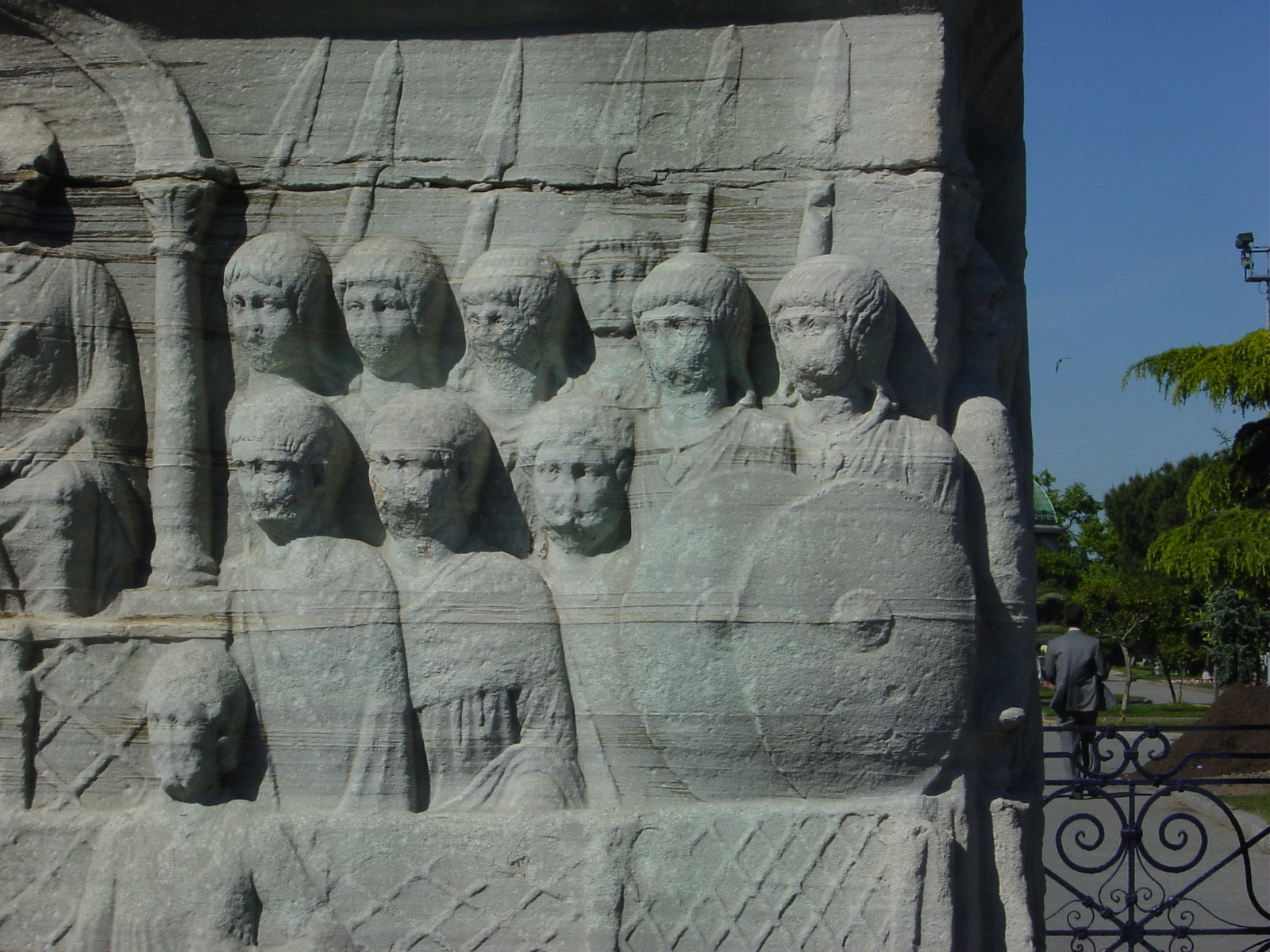
Late Roman soldiers, possibly of barbarian origin, as depicted in a relief by Emperor Theodosius I (r. 379–395)

The Roman army underwent considerable changes in the 4th century, experiencing what some have called 'barbarisation', traditionally understood as the result of recruitments of large amounts of barbarian soldiers. Though barbarian origins were seldom forgotten, the large scale and meritocratic nature of the Roman army made it relatively easy for "barbarian" recruits to enter the army and rise through the ranks only through their skills and achievements. (Note: Sometimes the inclusion of barbarian elements in the Roman army became awkward due to the prevailing anti-barbarian stereotypes. In the 4th-century civil war between Theodosius I (r. 379–395) and Magnus Maximus (r. 383–388), the army of Magnus Maximus was composed solely of Roman soldiers whereas the victorious Theodosius bolstered his forces with Gothic soldiers. Given the negative stereotypes, the panegyrist Latinius Pacatus Drepanius (fl. 389–393) described the troops of Maximus as having 'lost' their Romanness due to following the usurper, while emphasising the Roman qualities of the Gothic soldiers (though despite their loyalty, Pacatus never describes them as 'Roman'), describing them as uncharacteristically loyal for barbarians, disciplined and following orders. Though their barbarian nature is repeatedly emphasised, the Roman qualities of the Gothic warriors means that the army of Theodosius, in the view of Pacatus, remained fundamentally Roman. Per Pacatus, the remaining troops of Maximus were pardoned by Theodosius after the defeat of the usurper, and through this became Roman again. For people born within the empire, virtue and following the right Roman leader was thus seen by Pacatus as enough to be Roman, but for the barbarian troops who exhibited the same qualities it was not.) It is not clear to what extent there was actual non-Roman influence on the military; it is plausible that extensive numbers of barbarians were made part of the normal Roman military but it is equally plausible that there was also, or instead, a certain 'barbarian chic' in the army, comparable to the 19th-century French Zouaves (French military units in North Africa who adopted native clothing and cultural practices). The rise of non-Roman customs in the Roman military might not have resulted from increasing numbers of barbarian recruits, but rather from Roman military units along the imperial borders forming their own distinctive identities. In the late empire, the term "barbarian" was sometimes used in a general sense by Romans not in the military for Roman soldiers stationed alongside the imperial border, in reference to their perceived aggressive nature. No matter the reason, the Roman military increasingly came to embody 'barbarian' aspects that in previous times had been considered antithetical to the Roman ideal. Such aspects included emphasising strength and thirst for battle, as well as the assumption of "barbarian" strategies and customs, such as the barritus (a formerly Germanic battle cry), the Schilderhebung (raising an elected emperor up on a shield) as well as Germanic battle formations. The assumption of these customs might instead of barbarisation be attributable to the Roman army simply adopting customs it found useful, a common practice. Some barbarian soldiers recruited into the Roman army proudly embraced Roman identification (Note: For instance, a 3rd-century funerary inscription from Pannonia reads Francus ego cives Romanus miles in armis, which translates to "I, a Frank, a Roman citizen, a soldier in arms".) and in some cases, the barbarian heritage of certain late Roman individuals was even completely ignored in the wider Roman world. (Note: The barbarian heritage of Flavius Stilicho (c. 359–408), whose father was a Vandal but mother a Roman, regent in the Western Roman Empire during the early reign of Honorius (r. 393–423), was not a matter of debate until after his fall from grace and execution in 408. During his tenure as regent, Stilicho was repeatedly compared to heroes of the ancient Roman Republic, such as Scipio Africanus.)

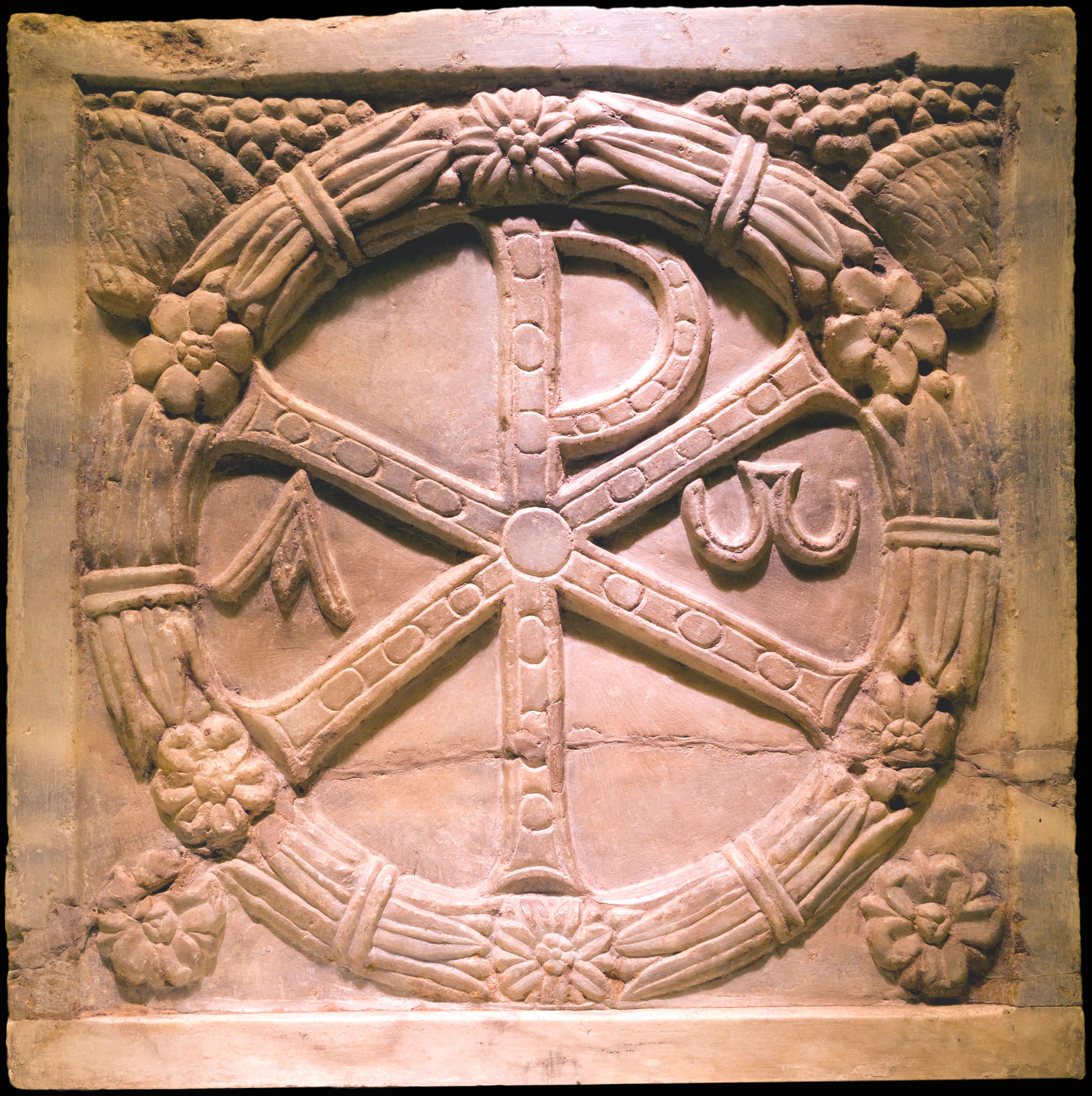
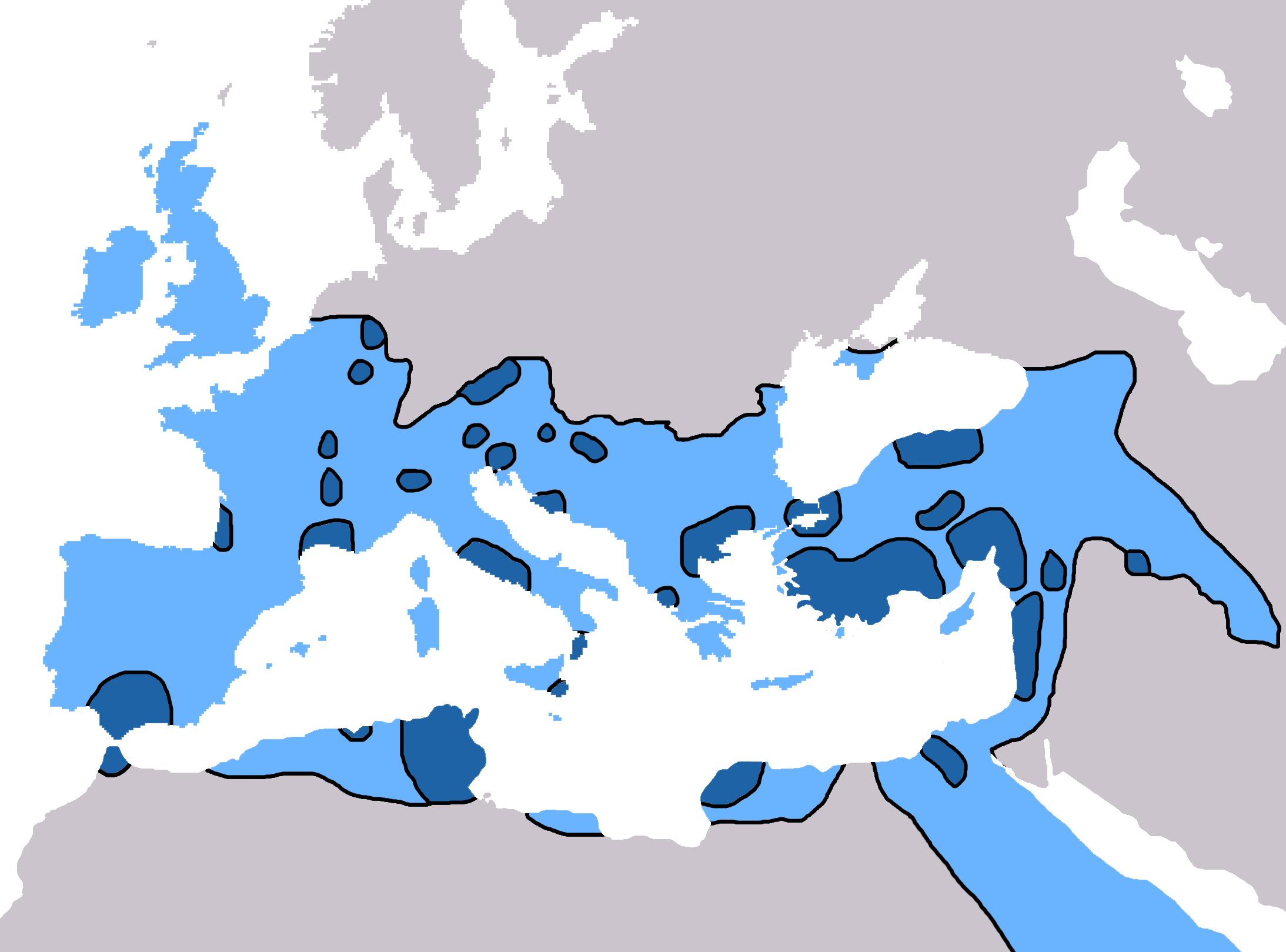
Chi Rho as depicted on a 4th-century sarcophagus and the spread of Christianity from AD 325 (dark blue) to AD 600 (light blue)

Religion had always been an important marker of Romanness. As Christianity gradually became the dominant religion in the Roman Empire through late antiquity, and eventually became the only legal faith, the Christianised Roman aristocracy had to redefine their Roman identity in Christian terms. The rise of Christianity did not go unnoticed or unchallenged by the conservative elements of the pagan Roman elite, who became aware that power was slipping from their hands. Many of them, pressured by the increasingly anti-pagan and militant Christians, turned to emphasising that they were the only 'true Romans' as they preserved the traditional Roman religion and literary culture. According to the Roman statesman and orator Quintus Aurelius Symmachus (c. 345–402), true Romans were those who followed the traditional Roman way of life, including its ancient religions, and it was adherence to those religions that in the end would protect the empire from its enemies, as in previous centuries. Per Symmachus and his supporters, Romanness had nothing to do with Christianity, but depended on Rome's pagan past and its status as the heart of a vast and polytheistic empire. The ideas of Symmachus were not popular among the Christians. Some church leaders, such as Ambrose, the Archbishop of Mediolanum, launched formal and vicious assaults on paganism and those members of the elite which defended it. Like Symmachus, Ambrose saw Rome as the greatest city of the Roman Empire, but not because of its pagan past but because of its Christian present. Throughout late antiquity, Romanness became increasingly defined by Christian faith, which would eventually become the standard. The status of Christianity was much increased through the adoption of the religion by the Roman emperors. Throughout late antiquity, the emperors and their courts were viewed as the Romans par excellence.

As the Roman Empire lost, or ceded control of, territories to various barbarian rulers, the status of the Roman citizens in those provinces sometimes came into question. People born as Roman citizens in regions that then came under barbarian control could be subjected to the same prejudice as barbarians were. (Note: The prominent late Roman figure Orestes (died 476) was born a Roman citizen in Pannonia and spoke Latin as his native language. In the 430s, Pannonia was ceded to Attila the Hun, whom Orestes came to serve as a secretary. Though there is no reason to believe that Orestes himself ever doubted his own Romanness, the loss of his native province to the barbarians and his own personal association with Attila led to Orestes becoming the target of the same prejudice against non-Romans as the barbarians were, with records of Orestes being offended at being treated worse at the imperial court than the Hunnic warriors who accompanied him. Despite this, Orestes remained fundamentally Roman in his outlook, and in time even became a general of the empire. In 475, Orestes installed his son, Romulus Augustulus, as the last emperor of the Western Roman Empire.) Over the course of the Roman Empire, men from nearly all of its provinces had come to rule as emperors. As such, Roman identity remained political, rather than ethnic, and open to people of various origins. This nature of Roman identity ensured that there was never a strong consolidation of a 'core identity' of Romans in Italy, but also likely contributed to the long-term endurance and success of the Roman state. The fall of the Western Roman Empire coincided with the first time the Romans actively excluded an influential foreign group within the empire, the barbarian and barbarian-descended generals of the 5th century, from Roman identity and access to the Roman imperial throne.

== Later history ==
The Roman Empire's expansion facilitated the spread of Roman identity over a large stretch of territories that had never before had a common identity and never would again. The effects of Roman rule on the personal identities of the empire's subjects was considerable and the resulting Roman identity outlasted actual imperial control by several centuries.

=== Western Europe ===
==== Early endurance of Roman identity ====
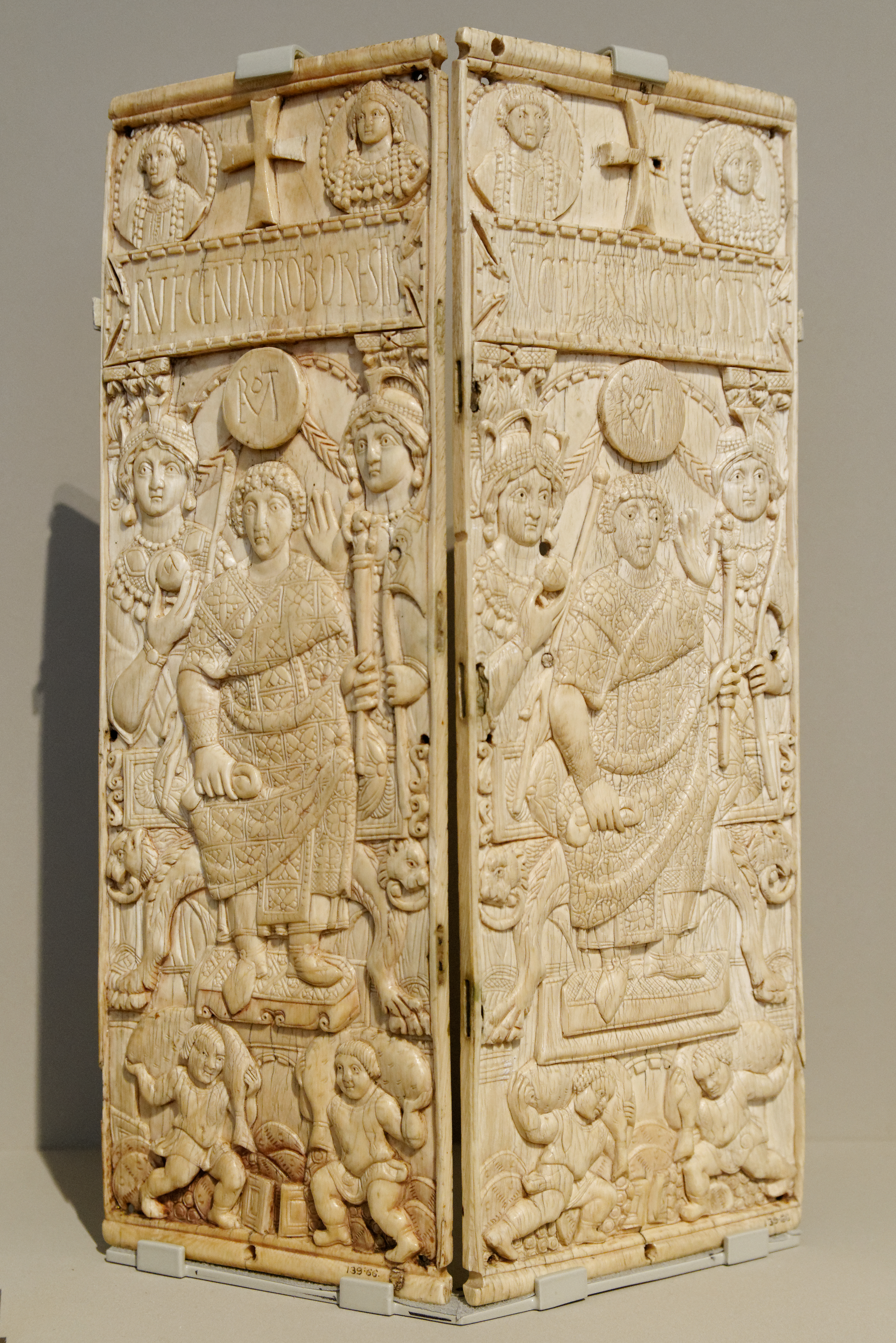
Consular diptych of Rufius Gennadius Probus Orestes, a Roman consul appointed during the time that Rome was under Ostrogothic rule

From the collapse of the Western Roman Empire in the late 5th century to the wars of Emperor Justinian I in the 6th century, the predominant structure of societies in the west was a near-completely barbarian military but also a near-completely Roman civil administration and aristocracy. The new Barbarian rulers took steps to present themselves as legitimate rulers within the Roman framework, with the pretense of legitimacy being especially strong among the rulers of Italy. The early kings of Italy, first Odoacer and then Theoderic the Great, were legally and ostensibly viceroys of the eastern emperor and thus integrated into the Roman government. Like the western emperors before them, they continued to appoint western consuls, which were accepted in the east and by the other barbarian kings. The imperial court in the east extended various honours to powerful barbarian rulers in the west, which was interpreted by the barbarians as enhancing their legitimacy; something they used to justify territorial expansion. In the early 6th century, Clovis I of the Franks and Theoderic the Great of the Ostrogoths nearly went to war with each other, a conflict that could have resulted in the re-establishment of the western empire under either king. Concerned about such a prospect, the eastern court never again extended similar honours to western rulers, instead beginning to emphasise its own exclusive Roman legitimacy, which it would continue to do for the rest of its history.

Culturally and legally, Roman identity remained prominent in the west for centuries, still providing a sense of unity throughout the Mediterranean. Italy's Ostrogothic Kingdom preserved the Roman Senate, which often dominated politics in Rome, illustrating the survival of and continued respect for Roman institutions and identity. The barbarian kings continued to use Roman law throughout the early Middle Ages, often issuing their own law collections. In 6th-century law collections issued by the Visigoths in Spain and the Franks in Gaul, it is clear that there were still large populations identifying as Romans in these regions given that the law collections distinguish between barbarians who live by their own laws and Romans who live by Roman law. Even after Italy was conquered by the Lombards in the late 6th century, the continued administration and urbanisation of northern Italy attest to a continued survival of Roman institutions and values. It was still possible for non-citizens (such as barbarians) in the west to become Roman citizens well into the 7th and 8th centuries; several surviving Visigothic and Frankish documents explain the benefits of becoming a Roman citizen and there are records of rulers and nobles freeing slaves and making them into citizens. Despite this, Roman identity was in a steep decline by the 7th and 8th centuries. (Note: A well-documented case of the Romans "disappearing" is northern Gaul in the 6th and 7th centuries. In the 6th century, the personnel of churches in the region was dominated by people with Roman names. For instance, only a handful of non-Roman and non-Biblical names are recorded in the episcopal list of Metz from before the year 600. After 600, the situation is reversed and bishops had predominantly Frankish names. The reason for this change in naming practices might be a change in naming practices in Gaul, that people entering church services no longer adopted Roman names or that the Roman families which had provided the church personnel dropped in status.)

==== Disappearances of Roman identity ====
The 6th-century reconquests of Emperor Justinian I (in yellow)

The great turning point in the history of the latter-day Romans of the west was the wars of Justinian I (533–555), aimed at reconquering the lost provinces of the Western Roman Empire. During Justinian's early reign, eastern authors re-wrote 5th-century history to portray the west as "lost" to barbarian invasions, rather than attempting to further integrate the barbarian rulers into the Roman world. By the end of the Justinianic wars, imperial control had returned to northern Africa and Italy, but the wars being founded on the idea that anything outside of the eastern empire's direct control was no longer part of the Roman Empire meant that there could no longer be any doubt that the lands beyond the imperial frontier were no longer Roman and instead remained "lost to barbarians". As a result, Roman identity in the still barbarian-ruled regions (i.e. Gaul, Spain and Britain) declined dramatically. During the reconquest of Italy, the Roman Senate disappeared and most of its members moved to Constantinople. Though the senate achieved a certain legacy in the west, (Note: In Gaul, members of the aristocracy were sometimes identified as "senators" from the 5th century to the 7th century and the Carolingian dynasty claimed to be descended from a former Roman senatorial family. In Spain, references to people of "senatorial stock" appear as late as the 7th century and in Lombard Italy, "Senator" became a personal name, with at least two people known to have had the name in the 8th century. The practice of representing themselves as "the Senate" was revived by the aristocracy within the city of Rome in the 8th century, though the institution itself was not revived.) the end of the institution removed a group that had always set the standard of what Romanness was supposed to mean. The war in Italy also divided the Roman elite there between those who enjoyed barbarian rule and those who supported the empire and later withdrew to imperial territory, meaning that Roman identity ceased to provide a sense of social and political cohesion.

The division of Western Europe into multiple different kingdoms accelerated the disappearance of Roman identity, as the previously unifying identity was replaced by local identities based on the region one was from. The fading connectivitiy also meant that while largely Roman law and culture continued on, the language became increasingly fragmented and split, Latin gradually developing into what would become the modern Romance languages. Where they had once been the majority of the population, the Romans of Gaul and Hispania gradually and quietly faded away as their descendants adopted other names and identities. In Sub-Roman Britain, the people of the large urban centers clung to Roman identity, but rural populations integrated and assimilated with Germanic colonisers (the Jutes, Angles and Saxons). Once the large cities declined, Roman identity faded away in Britain as well.

The adoption of local identities in Gaul and Hispania was made more attractive in that they were not binary opposed to the identity of the barbarian rulers in the same way that 'Roman' was; for instance, one could not be both Roman and Frankish, but it was possible to, for instance, be both Arvernian (i.e. from Auvergne) and Frankish. In Hispania, "Gothic" transitioned from simply an ethnic identity to being both an ethnic one (in the sense of descent from Goths) and a political one (in the sense of allegiance to the king). Gothic becoming more fluid and multi-dimensional as an identity facilitated a smooth transition from people identifying as Romans to people identifying as Goths. There were few differences between the Goths and the Romans of Hispania at this point; the Visigoths no longer practised Arian Christianity and Romans, just like the Goths, were from the 6th century onwards allowed to serve in the military. Though Roman identity was rapidly disappearing, the Visigothic Kingdom in the 6th and 7th centuries thus also produced several prominent latter-day Roman generals, such as Claudius and Paulus.

The disappearance of the Romans is reflected in the barbarian law collections. In the Salic law of Clovis I (from around 500), the Romans and the Franks are the two major parallel populations of the kingdom and both have well-defined legal statuses. A century later in the Lex Ripuaria, the Romans are just one of many smaller semi-free populations, restricted in their legal capacity, with many of their former advantages now associated with Frankish identity. Such legal arrangements would have been unthinkable under the Roman Empire and under the early decades of barbarian rule. By Charlemagne's imperial coronation in 800, Roman identity largely disappeared in Western Europe and fell to low social status. (Note: 8th century sources from Salzburg still reference that there was a social group in the city called the Romani tributales but Romans at this time mostly merged with the wider tributales (tributary peoples) distinction rather than being separate in Frankish documents. Throughout most of former Gaul, the Roman elite which had lingered for centuries merged with the Frankish elite and lost their previous distinct identity. Though "Romans" continued to be a dominant identity in regional politics in southern Gaul for a while, the specific references to some individuals as "Romans" or "descendants of Romans" indicates that their Roman status was perhaps no longer being taken for granted and needed pointing out. The last groups of Romani in the Frankish realm lingered for some time, especially in Salzburg and Raetia, but mostly fade away in the early 9th century.) The situation was somewhat paradoxical: living Romans, in Rome and elsewhere, had a poor reputation, with records of anti-Roman attacks and the use of 'Roman' as an insult, but the name of Rome was also used a source of great and unfailing political power and prestige, employed by many aristocratic families (sometimes proudly proclaiming invented Roman origins) and rulers throughout history. Through suppressing Roman identity in the lands they ruled and discounting the remaining empire in the east as "Greek", the Frankish state hoped to avoid the possibility of the Roman people proclaiming a Roman emperor in the same way that the Franks proclaimed a Frankish king.

==== Reversion to Rome proper ====
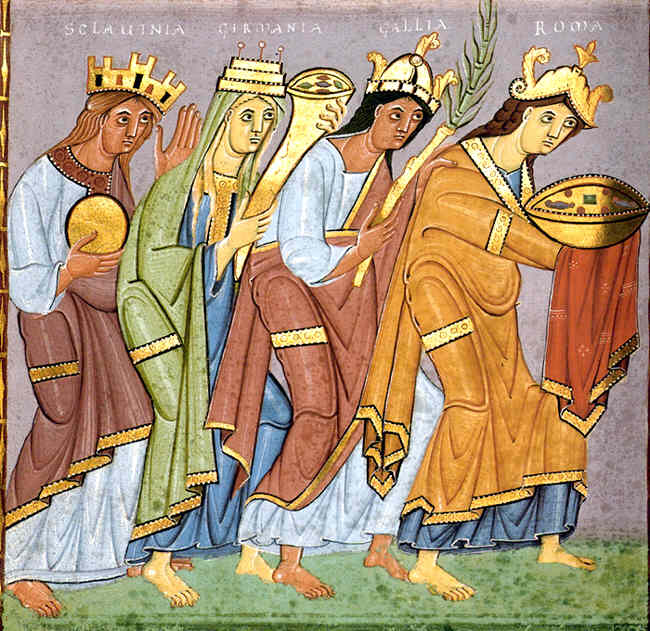
Personifications (left to right) of the Slavic, German, Gallic and Roman peoples, depicted as bringing gifts to Holy Roman Emperor Otto III

The population of the city of Rome continued to identify, and be identified, as Romans by westerners. Although Rome's history was not forgotten, the city's importance in the Middle Ages primarily stemmed from it being the seat of the pope, (Note: For instance, in the 6th century writings of Gregory of Tours, Rome is not mentioned until Saint Peter arrives there, and Gregory appears indifferent to Rome once having been the capital of an empire.) a view shared by both westerners and the eastern empire. During the centuries following Justinian's reconquest, when the city was still under imperial control, the population was not specially administered and did not have any political participation in wider imperial affairs. When clashing with the emperors, the popes sometimes employed the fact that they had the backing of the populus Romanus ("people of Rome") as a legitimising factor, meaning that the city still endured some ideological importance in terms of Romanness. Western European authors and intellectuals increasingly associated Romanness only with the city itself. (Note: As with the other early Medieval changes to Roman identity, the origins of this change can be traced to the 6th century. Cassiodorus, who served the Gothic kings, used 'Romans' to describe Roman people across Italy, but Pope Gregory the Great, at the end of the 6th century, uses 'Roman' almost exclusively for the people in the city. The Historia Langobardorum, written by Paul the Deacon in the 8th century, postulates that the term civis Romanus ("Roman citizen") is applied solely to someone who either lived in, or was born in, the city of Rome and it could for instance be applied to the Archbishop of Ravenna, Marinianus, only because he had originally been born in Rome. This indicates that the term at some point ceased to generally refer to all the Latin-speaking subjects of the Lombard kings and became restricted to the city itself.) By the second half of the 8th century, westerners almost exclusively used the term to refer to the population of the city. When the temporal power of the papacy was established through the foundation of the Papal States in the 8th century, the popes used the fact that they were accompanied and supported by the populus Romanus as something that legitimised their sovereignty.

The Roman populace considered neither the eastern empire nor Charlemagne's new "Holy Roman Empire" to be properly Roman. Though the continuity from Rome to Constantinople was accepted in the west, surviving sources point to the easterners being seen as Greeks who had abandoned Rome and Roman identity. The Carolingian kings on the other hand were seen as having more to do with the Lombard kings of Italy than the ancient Roman emperors. The medieval Romans also often equated the Franks with the ancient Gauls, and viewed them as aggressive, insolent and vain. Despite this, the Holy Roman emperors were recognised by the citizens of Rome as true Roman emperors, (Note: Only in the sense of sharing continuity with the ancient emperors and governing the Roman Empire. The Holy Roman emperors were not seen as "Romans" in any sense.) albeit only because of their support and coronation by the popes.

The Franks and other westerners did not view the population of Rome favourably either. Foreign sources are generally hostile, ascribing traits such as unrest and deceit to the Romans and describing them as "as proud as they are helpless". Anti-Roman sentiment lasted throughout the Middle Ages. (Note: As late as the 13th and 14th centuries, the writer Dante Alighieri wrote that the Romans "stand out among all Italians for the ugliness of their manners and their outward appearance".) The Romans partly owed their bad reputation to sometimes trying to take an independent position towards the popes of the Holy Roman emperors. Given that these rulers were seen as having universal power, the Romans were considered intruders in affairs that exceeded their competence.

=== North Africa ===
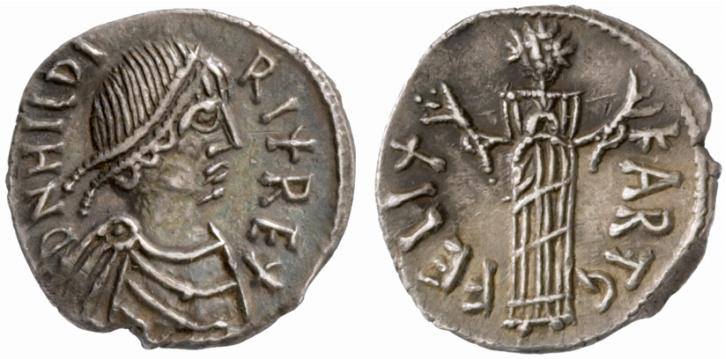
Silver "50 denarii" of the Vandal king Hilderic (r. 523–530). The reverse depicts the personified Carthage and is inscribed: "Felix Kartg" ("Fortunate Carthage").

Unlike the other kingdoms, the Vandal Kingdom in North Africa did not maintain a pretense of loyalty to the Roman Empire. Since the term 'Roman' was seen as implying political loyalty to the empire, it was regarded by the Vandal government as politically loaded and suspicious. As a consequence, the Roman population of the kingdom rarely self-identified as such, though important markers of Romanness, such as Roman naming customs, adherence to Nicene Christianity as well as the Latin-language literary tradition, (Note: By the time of the Vandal Kingdom's fall, the Vandalic language was in sharp decline, if not almost entirely extinct. There are records of bishops from the Vandal Kingdom pretending not to be able to speak Latin to avoid debates with bishops from the eastern empire and the other kingdoms, but such claims were doubted even by their contemporaries.) survived throughout the kingdom's existence. Despite objections to 'Roman' as a term for the populace, the Vandals partly appealed to Roman legitimacy to legitimise themselves as rulers, given that the Vandal kings had marriage connections to the imperial Theodosian dynasty. However, the Vandal state more strongly worked to legitimise itself through appealing to the pre-Roman cultural elements of the region, particularly the Carthaginian Empire. Some symbols of the ancient state were revived and the city of Carthage, capital of the kingdom, was heavily emphasised in poetry, on coinage and in the creation of a new "Carthaginian calendar". Coins minted by the Vandals were inscribed with Felix Karthago ("fortunate Carthage") and Carthagine Perpetua ("Carthage eternal").

The Vandalic promotion of independent African symbols had a profound effect on the formerly Roman populace of their kingdom. By the time the soldiers of the eastern empire landed in Africa during Justinian's Vandalic War, the Romance people of North Africa had ceased to identify as Romans, instead preferring either Libyans (Libicus) or Punic people (Punicus). Contemporary eastern authors also described them as Libyans (Λίβυες). During the Vandal Kingdom's brief existence, the Vandal ruling class had culturally and ethnically merged with the Romano-Africans. By the time the kingdom fell, the only real cultural differences between the "Libyans" and "Vandals" were that Vandals adhered to Arian Christianity and were permitted to serve in the army. After North Africa was reincorporated into the empire, the eastern Roman government deported the Vandals from the region, which shortly thereafter led to disappearance of the Vandals as a distinct group. The only individuals recorded to have been deported were soldiers; given that the wives and children of the "Vandals" thus remained in North Africa, the name at this stage appears to mainly have denoted the soldier class.

Despite North Africa's reincorporation into the empire, the distinction between "Libyans" and "Romans" (i.e. the inhabitants of the eastern empire) was maintained by both groups. Per the writings of the 6th-century eastern historian Procopius, the Libyans were descended from Romans, ruled by the Romans, and served in the Roman army, but their Romanness had diverged too much from that of the populace of the empire as a result of the century of Vandal rule. Imperial policy reflected the view that the North Africans were no longer Romans. Whereas governors in the eastern provinces were often native to their respective provinces, the military and administrative staff in North Africa was almost entirely constituted by easterners. The imperial government distrusting the locals was hardly surprising given that imperial troops had been harassed by local (formerly Roman) peasants during the Vandalic War, supportive of the Vandal regime, and that there had been several rebels thereafter, such as Guntarith and Stotzas, who sought to restore an independent kingdom. The distinction between the Romans and the Romance people of North Africa is also reflected in foreign sources, and the two populations appear to not yet have been reconciled by the time the African provinces fell during the Muslim conquest of the Maghreb and Roman rule was terminated. (Note: The Arab historian Ibn Abd al-Hakam, who wrote of the Muslim conquest of the Maghreb, described North Africa as home to three peoples: the Berbers, the Romans (Rūm) and the Africans (Afāriq).)

=== Eastern Mediterranean ===
==== Survival of the Roman Empire in the east ====
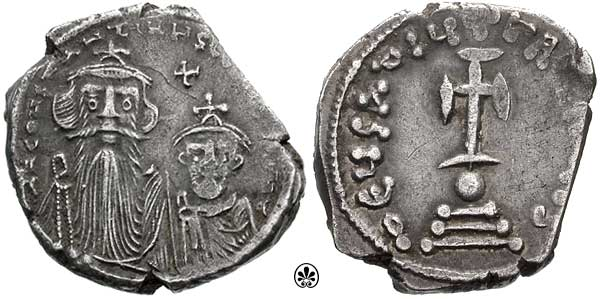
Coin depicting emperors Constans II (r. 641–668) and Constantine IV (r. 668–685). The coin is inscribed with the Latin phrase Deus adiuta Romanis ("May God help the Romans").

Eastern Mediterranean populations, which remained under Eastern Roman (or "Byzantine") control after the 5th century, retained "Roman" as their predominant identity; the majority of the population saw themselves as being Roman beyond any doubt and their emperor as ruling from the cultural and religious center of the Roman Empire: Constantinople, the New Rome. In the centuries when the Byzantine Empire was still a vast Mediterranean-spanning state, Roman identity was more strong in the imperial heartlands than on the peripheries, (Note: For instance, Byzantine individuals from Italy almost never describe themselves as "Roman" and Syriac sources almost always treat the Romans in third person.) though it was also strongly embraced in the peripheral regions in times of uncertainty. (Note: For instance, an inscription on a brick from Sirmium, inscribed during the Avar siege of the city in 580–582, reads "Oh Lord, help the town and halt the Avar and protect the Romanía and the scribe. Amen.") As in earlier centuries, the Romans of the early Byzantine Empire were considered a people united by being subjects of the Roman state, rather than a people united through sharing ethnic descent (i.e. gens like those ascribed to different barbarian groups). (Note: There are early references to Romans as a gens, for instance the late antiquity works of Priscian and Jordanes, but they are very rare.) The term extended to all Christian citizens of the empire, in a general sense referring to those who followed Chalcedonian Christianity and were loyal to the emperor.

In Byzantine writings up until at least the 12th century, the idea of the Roman "homeland" consistently referred not to Greece or Italy, but to the entire old Roman world. (Note: For much of its history, the populace of the Byzantine Empire firmly believed that the western empire, and other territories, would eventually be reconquered. As late as the middle of the 12th-century, the Byzantine princess Anna Komnene wrote that if her father, emperor Alexios I Komnenos (r. 1081–1118), "had not been hindered by unfavourable circumstances, he would have rightfully restored Roman rule over the whole former Roman world, up to the limits of the Atlantic Ocean in the west and India in the east".) Despite this, the Romans of Byzantium were also aware that their present empire was no longer as powerful as it once had been, and that centuries of warfare and strife had left the Roman Empire reduced in territory and somewhat humbled.

Given that the rulers of the Byzantine Empire were predominantly Hellenic, and the percentage of the population that was Hellenic became greater as the empire's borders were increasingly reduced, Western Europeans, from as early as the 6th century onwards, (Note: One of the earliest western references to the easterners as "Greeks" comes from Bishop Avitus of Vienne who wrote, in the context of the Frankish king Clovis I's baptism; "Let Greece, to be sure, rejoice in having an orthodox ruler, but she is no longer the only one to deserve such a great gift".) often referred to it as a Greek empire, inhabited by Greeks. To the early Byzantines themselves, up until the 11th century or so, terms such as "Hellenes" were seen as offensive, as it downplayed their Roman nature and furthermore associated them with the ancient Pagan Greeks rather than the more recent Christian Romans. The westerners were not unaware of Byzantium's Romanness; when not wishing to distance themselves from the eastern empire, the term Romani was frequently used for soldiers and subjects of the eastern emperors. From the 6th to 8th century, western authors also sometimes employed terms such as res publica or sancta res publica for the Byzantine Empire, still identifying it with the old Roman Republic. Such references ceased as Byzantine control of Italy and Rome itself crumbled and the Papacy began to use the term for their own, much more regional, domain and sphere of influence.

==== After the Muslim conquests ====
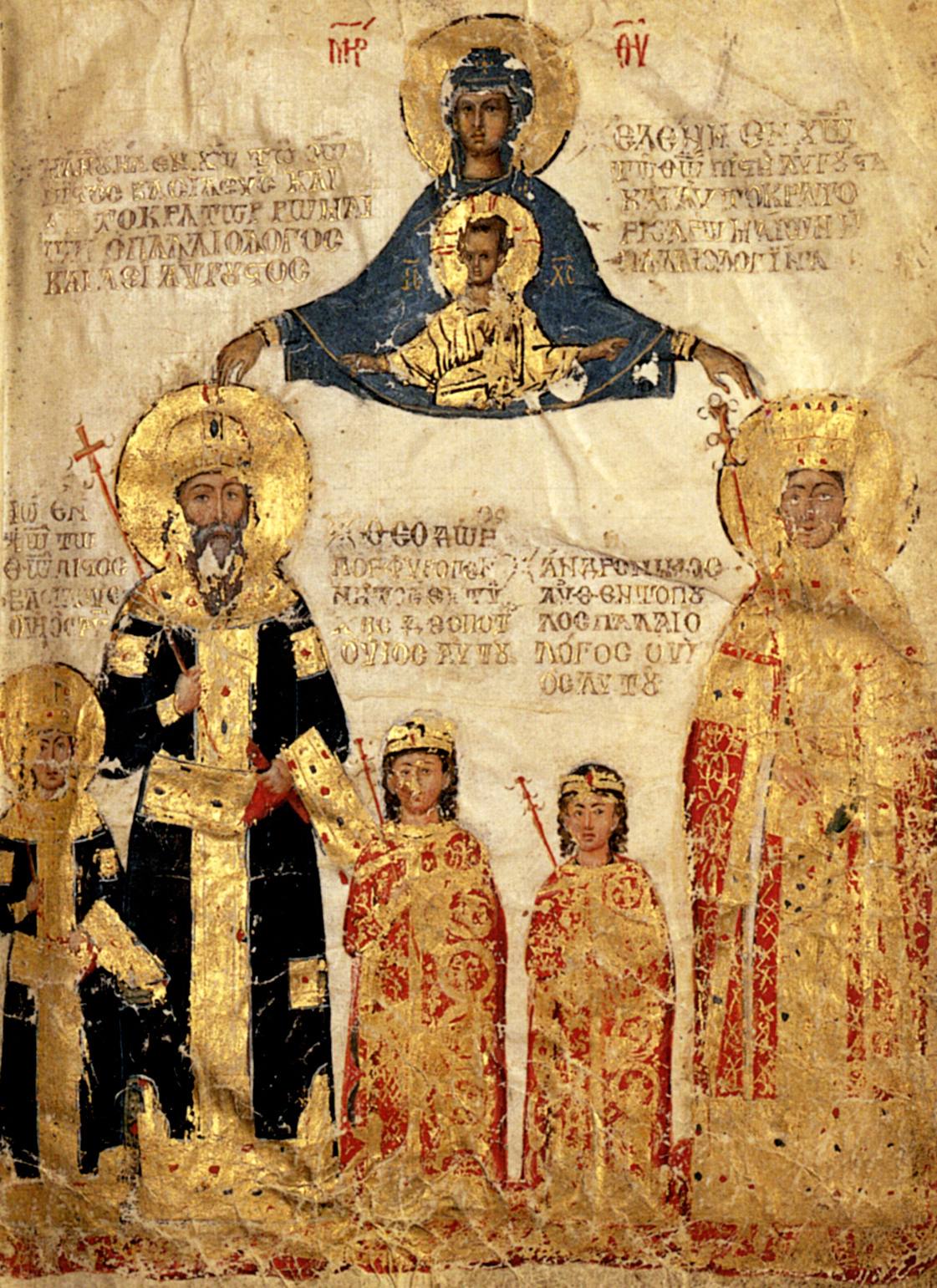
15th-century miniature depicting Emperor Manuel II Palaiologos (r. 1391–1425) and his family. The text titles him as "Emperor and Autocrat of the Romans" and "forever Augustus".

As the Byzantine Empire lost its territories in Egypt, the Levant and Italy, the Christians who lived in those regions ceased to be recognised by the Byzantine government as Romans, much in the same vein as had happened with the North Africans under Vandal rule. The decrease in the diversity of peoples recognised as being Roman meant that the term Roman increasingly came to be applied only to the now dominant Hellenic population of the remaining territories, rather than to all imperial citizens. As the Hellenic populace were united by following Orthodox Christianity, spoke the same Greek language, and believed that they shared a common ethnic origin, "Roman" (Rhōmaîoi in Greek) thus gradually transformed into an ethnic identity. By the late 7th century, Greek, rather than Latin, had begun being referred to in the east as the rhomaisti (Roman way of speaking). In chronicles written in the 10th century, the Rhōmaîoi begin to appear as just one of the ethnicities in the empire (alongside, for instance, Armenians) and by the late 11th century, there are references in historical writings to people as being "Rhōmaîos by birth", signalling the completion of the transformation of "Roman" into an ethnic description. At this point, "Roman" also began being used for Greek populations outside of the imperial borders, such as to the Greek-speaking Christians under Seljuk rule in Anatolia, who were referred to as Rhōmaîoi despite actively resisting attempts at re-integration by the Byzantine emperors. Only a handful of late sources retain the old view of a Roman being a citizen of the Roman world. (Note: The 15th century Byzantine historian Doukas, for instance, refers to the Genoese general Giovanni Giustiniani, who assisted the Byzantines at the fall of Constantinople, as a 'general of the Romans'.)

The capture of Constantinople by the non-Roman Latin crusaders of the Fourth Crusade in 1204 ended the unbroken Roman continuity from Rome to Constantinople. In order to legitimise themselve as Romans in the decades when they no longer controlled Constantinople, the Byzantine elite began to look to other markers of what Romans were. The elites of the Empire of Nicaea, the Byzantine government-in-exile, chiefly looked to Greek cultural heritage and Orthodox Christianity, connecting the contemporary Romans to the ancient Greeks. This contributed to Romanness becoming even more increasingly associated with people who were ethno-culturally Hellenic. Under the Nicene emperors John III (r. 1222–1254) and Theodore II (r. 1254–1258), these ideas were taken further than ever before as they explicitly stated that the present Rhōmaîoi were Hellenes, descendants of the Ancient Greeks. Though they saw themselves as Hellenic, the Nicene emperors also maintained that they were the only true Roman emperors. "Roman" and "Hellenic" were not viewed as opposing terms, but building blocks of the same double-identity. During the rule of the Palaiologos dynasty, from the recapture of Constantinople in 1261 to the fall of the empire in 1453, Hellene lost ground as a self-identity, with few known uses of the term, and Rhōmaîoi once again became the dominant term used for self-description. Some Byzantine authors went as far as to return to using "Hellenic" and "Greek" solely as terms for the ancient pagan Greeks. (Note: In the writings of Doukas, the Greeks are a foreign people, separated from the present Romans by both time and religious differences. Doukas also uses the terms in an insulting manner for the anti-unionists active near the fall of Constantinople.)

==== After the fall of Constantinople ====
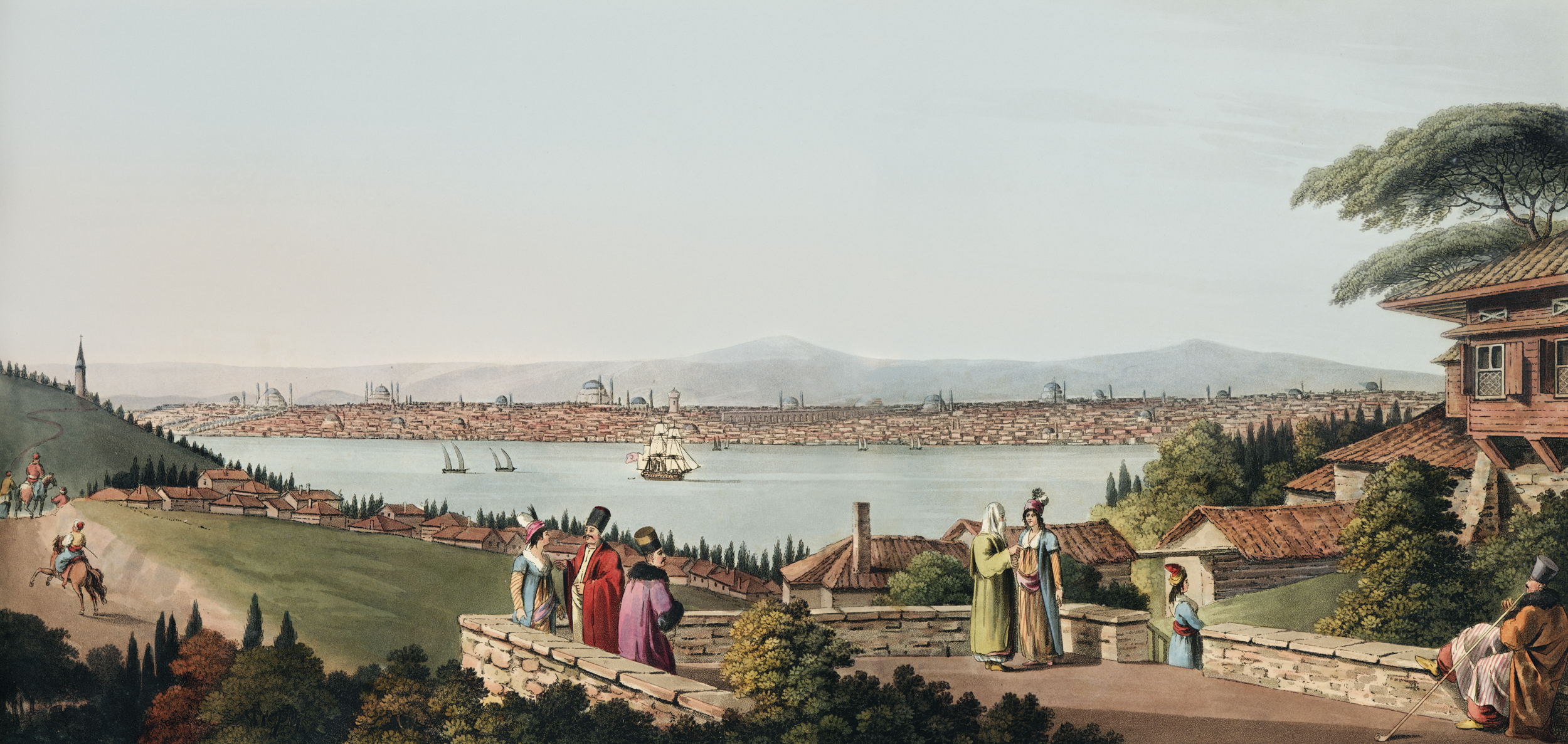
Ottoman Greeks in Constantinople, painted by Luigi Mayer (1755–1803)

Rhōmaîoi survived the fall of the Byzantine Empire as the primary self-designation of the Christian Greek inhabitants of the new Turkish Ottoman Empire. The popular historical memory of these Romans was not occupied with the glorious past of the Roman Empire of old or the Hellenism in the Byzantine Empire, but focused on legends of the fall and the loss of their Christian homeland and Constantinople. One such narrative was the myth that the last emperor, Constantine XI Palaiologos would one day return from the dead to reconquer the city, a myth that endured in Greek folklore up until the time of the Greek War of Independence (1821–1829) and beyond.

In the early modern period, many Ottoman Turks, especially those who lived in the cities and were not part of the military or administration, also self-identified as Romans (Rūmī, رومى), as inhabitants of former Byzantine territory. The term Rūmī had originally been used by Muslims for Christians in general, though later became restricted to just the Byzantines. After 1453, the term was not only sometimes a Turkish self-identification, but it was also used to refer to Ottoman Turks by other Islamic states and peoples. The identification of the Ottomans with the Romans was also made outside of the Islamic world. 16th-century Portuguese sources refer to the Ottomans they battled in the Indian Ocean as "rumes" and the Chinese Ming dynasty referred to the Ottomans as Lumi (魯迷), a transliteration of Rūmī, and to Constantinople as Lumi cheng (魯迷城, "Lumi city"). As applied to Ottoman Turks, Rūmī began to fall out of use at the end of the 17th century, and instead the word increasingly became associated only with the Greek population of the empire, a meaning that it still bears in Turkey today.

As applied to the Greeks, the self-identity as Romans endured longer, and for a long time there was widespread hope that the Romans would be liberated and that their empire would be restored. (Note: As an example, the chronicler Gaza Paisios Ligaridis wrote in the 17th century that "it is a great comfort to us thrice-miserable Romans to hear that there shall come a resurrection, a deliverance of our Genos". When the Russo-Turkish War of 1768–1774 failed to lead to the restoration of the empire, Kaisarios Dapontes wrote that "the empire of the Romans will never be resurrected" and Athanasios Komninos-Ypsilantis wrote that "if therefore, in the time appointed by the prophecies, the Romans have not been liberated, then it will be very difficult for the resurrection of the Roman empire to take place".) By the time of the Greek War of Independence, the dominant self-identity of the Greeks was still Rhōmaîoi or Romioi.

== Modern identity ==
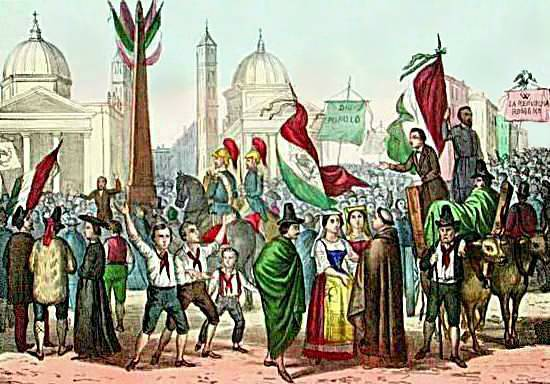
Proclamation in 1849 of the Roman Republic in Piazza del Popolo, Rome

The residents of Rome continue to identify with the demonym 'Roman' to this day. Rome is the most populous city in Italy with the city proper being home to about 2.8 million citizens and the Rome metropolitan area to over four million people. Since the collapse of the western Roman empire, the Papacy has continued the institution of the Pontifex Maximus and governments inspired by the ancient Roman Republic have been revived in the city four times. The earliest such government was the Commune of Rome in the 12th century, founded as opposition towards the temporal powers of the Pope, which was followed by the government of Cola di Rienzo, who used the titles of 'tribune' and 'senator', in the 14th century, a sister republic to revolutionary France in the 18th century, which restored the office of Roman consul, and finally as the short-lived Roman Republic in 1849, with a government based on the triumvirates of ancient Rome.

Roman self-identification among Greeks remained throughout the Ottoman period. The traveller and antiquary Richard Chandler, having travelled across Greece in the 1760s, remarked in 1776 that while the locals of Athens called the classical form of their language "Hellenic", they considered their present language and nation to be "Roman". Roman self-identification among Greeks only began losing ground with the Greek War of Independence, when multiple factors saw the name 'Hellene' rise to replace it. Among these factors were that names such as "Hellene", "Hellas" and "Greece" were already in use for the country and its people by the other nations in Europe, the absence of the old Byzantine government to reinforce Roman identity, and the term Romioi becoming associated with those Greeks still under Ottoman rule rather than those actively fighting for independence. Thus, in the eyes of the independence movement, a Hellene was a brave and rebellious freedom fighter while a Roman was an idle slave under the Ottomans. The new Hellenic national identity was heavily focused on the cultural heritage of ancient Greece rather than medieval Byzantium, though adherence to Orthodox Christianity remained an important aspect of Greek identity. An identity re-oriented towards ancient Greece also worked in Greece's favour internationally. In Western Europe, the Greek War of Independence saw large-scale support owing to philhellenism, a sense of "civilisational debt" to the world of classical antiquity, rather than any actual interest in the modern country. Despite the modern Greeks bearing more resemblance to the medieval Byzantines than the Greeks of the ancient world, public interest in the revolt elsewhere in Europe hinged almost entirely on sentimental and intellectual attachments to a romanticised version of ancient Greece. Comparable uprisings against the Ottomans by other peoples in the Balkans, such as the First Serbian Uprising (1804–1814), had been almost entirely ignored in Western Europe.

Many Greeks, particularly those outside the then newly founded Greek state, continued to refer to themselves as Romioi well into the 20th century. (Note: Peter Charanis, who was born on the island of Lemnos in 1908 and later became a professor of Byzantine history at Rutgers University, recounts that when the island was taken from the Ottomans by Greece in 1912, Greek soldiers were sent to each village and stationed themselves in the public squares. According to Charanis, some of the island children ran to see what Greek soldiers looked like; ‘‘what are you looking at?’’ one of the soldiers asked. ‘‘At Hellenes,’’ the children replied. ‘‘Are you not Hellenes yourselves?’’ the soldier retorted. ‘‘No, we are Romans’’ the children replied.) What Greek identity ought to be remained unresolved for a long time. As late as the 1930s, more than a century of the war of independence, Greek artists and authors still debated the contribution of Greece to European culture, and whether it should derive from a romantic fascination with classical antiquity, a nationalist dream of a restored Byzantine Empire, the strong oriental influence from the centuries of Ottoman rule or if it should be something entirely new, or "Neohellenic", reminding Europe that there was not only an ancient Greece, but also a modern one. The modern Greek people still sometimes use Romioi to refer to themselves, as well as the term "Romaic" ("Roman") to refer to their Modern Greek language. Roman identity also survives prominently in some of the Greek populations outside of Greece itself. For instance, Greeks in Ukraine, settled there as part of Catherine the Great's Greek Plan in the 18th century, maintain Roman identity, designating themselves as Rumaioi. The term Rum or Rumi also sees continued usage by Turks and Arabs as a religious term for followers of the Greek Orthodox Church, not only those of Greek ethnicity.

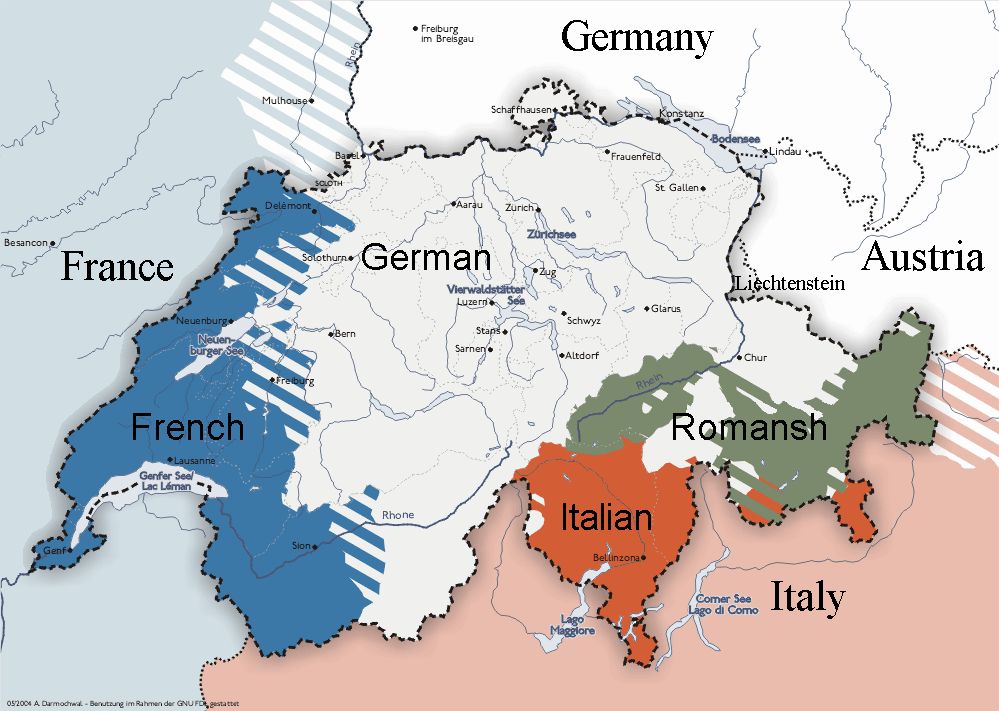
Language map of Switzerland, with regions speaking French (Romandy) in blue and Romansh in green

The vast majority of the Romance peoples that descended from the intermingling of Romans and Germanic peoples following the collapse of Roman political unity in the west diverged into groups that no longer identify as Romans. In the Alpine regions north of Italy however, Roman identity showed considerable tenacity. The Romansh people of Switzerland are descended from these populations, which in turn were descended from Romanised Rhaetians. Though most of the Romans of the region were assimilated by the Germanic tribes that settled there during the 5th and 6th centuries, the people who resisted assimilation became the Romansh people. In their own, Romansh language, they are called rumantsch or romontsch, which derives from the Latin romanice ("Romance"). Roman identity also survives in the Romands, the French-speaking community of Switzerland, and their homeland, Romandy, which covers the western part of the country.

In some regions, the Germanic word for the Romans (also used for western neighbours in general), walhaz, became an ethnonym, although it is in many cases only attested centuries after the end of Roman rule in said regions. The term walhaz is the origin of the modern term 'Welsh', i.e. the people of Wales, and of the historical exonym 'Vlach', which was used through the Middle Ages and the Modern Period for various Eastern Romance peoples. As endonyms, Roman identification was maintained by several Eastern Romance peoples. Prominently, the Romanians call themselves români and their nation România. How and when the Romanians came to adopt these names is not entirely clear, (Note: One of the earliest records of the Romanians possibly being referred to as Romans is given in the Nibelungenlied, a German epic poem written before 1200 in which a "Duke Ramunc from the land of Vlachs" is mentioned. It has been argued that "Ramunc" was not the name of the duke, but a collective name that highlighted his ethnicity. Other documents, especially Byzantine or Hungarian ones, also attest the old Romanians as Romans or their descendants.) but one theory is the idea of Daco-Roman continuity, that the modern Romanians are descended from Daco-Romans that came about as a result of Roman colonisation following the conquest of Dacia by Trajan (r. 98–117). The Aromanians, also of unclear origin, refer to themselves by various names, including arumani, armani, aromani and rumani, all of which are etymologically derived from the Latin Rōmānī. The Istro-Romanians sometimes identify as rumeri or similar terms, though these names have lost strength and Istro-Romanians often identify with their native villages instead. The Megleno-Romanians also identified as rumâni in the past, though this name was mostly replaced in favour of the term vlasi centuries ago. Vlasi is derived from "Vlach", in turn deriving from walhaz.

== See also ==
- List of ancient Italic peoples
- Pan-Latinism
- Romance-speaking world
