= Cornuti =

Unit of the Late Roman army

Shield of the Cornuti, according to the Notitia Dignitatum.

Shield of the Cornuti seniores, according to the Notitia Dignitatum.

The Cornuti ("horned") was an auxilia palatina unit of the Late Roman army, active in the 4th and 5th century. It was probably related to the Cornuti seniores and the Cornuti iuniores.

== History ==
According to some scholars, they are depicted on the Arch of Constantine, as the soldiers who are shown wearing horned helmets. On the relief representing the Battle of Verona (312) they are in the first lines, and they are depicted fighting with the bowmen in the relief of the Battle of the Milvian Bridge.

The Cornuti belonged to the comitatus of Gaul, and is attested on the northern border since 355. In 357 it was led by the tribunus Bainobaudes in an attack against the Alemanni who had attacked the Roman territory and had later retired on a small island.

In that same year, the Cornuti fought the Alemanni in the Battle of Argentoratum, under the command of the emperor Julian. When the Alamannic cavalry caused the Roman equites to flee, the Cornuti and its twin unit, the Brachiati, held the enemy horsemen until Julian rallied the Roman cavalry and brought them back in battle. Despite the Romans being victorious, Bainobaudes, the tribune of the Cornuti was killed.

The Cornuti and the Brachiati were famous for their barritus, a combination of shout and dance step.

The Notitia Dignitatum, a document describing civil and military offices in the Western Roman Empire around 420 and in the Eastern Roman Empire in 395 circa, records the existence of the Cornuti seniores under the command of the magister peditum praesentalis of the West. The same source records the existence of the Cornuti iuniores, who fought in the Battle of Adrianople (378) and later part the army of the magister militum praesentalis of the East. Later the Cornuti iuniores were sent to guard the Porta Aurea of Constantinople together with the Leones iuniores, as testified by an inscription date to 413.
