= Bainobaudes =

Fourth century Roman soldier

Bainobaudes (c. 320 - 357 AD) was a Roman soldier of Frank ancestry who served under emperors Constantius II and Julian. Bainobaudes was tribune of the scola Scutatiorum under the Caesar Julian during his campaigns against the Alamanni in Gaul. During a pincer movement led by Julian and the general Barbatio, a band of Alamanni slipped past them and attacked Lugdunum (Lyon). Julian sent the tribunes Valentinian (the future emperor) and Bainobaudes to watch the road the raiders would have to return by. However, their efforts were hindered by Barbatio and his tribune Cella. The Alamann king Chnodomarius took advantage of the situation and attacked the Romans in detail, inflicting heavy losses. Barbatio complained to Constantius and the debacle was blamed on Bainobaudes and Valentinian, who were cashiered from the army. However, Bainobaudes' position was soon rehabilitated and he was made tribune of the Cornuti. Bainobaudes was killed during the Battle of Argentoratum, a decisive Roman victory against the Alamanni.
