= Barritus =

Battle cry

Barritus (barrītūs) is a battle cry documented in writing since the 1st century among Germanic tribes. The technique of Barritus later became popular among Germanic auxiliary troops in the Roman Army. In the 4th century, Ammianus Marcellinus describes Barritus as typical for Germanic auxiliary troops. Publius Cornelius Tacitus describes the Barritus in his work Germania (3, 1 as barditus).

== Spelling and etymology ==
The terms Barritus, Baritus, and Barditus are various spellings of the same word.

Barditus from the 1st century probably evolved into Barritus by the 4th century. A universally satisfying explanation of the word has not been provided yet. It's interpreted either as "shield-song", derived from Old Norse bardi 'shield', or as "beard-way" (the humming in the beard), imitating the thunderous voice of the god Donar.

== Characteristics ==
The Barritus opens the battle and is meant to boost the morale of one's own side while intimidating and frightening the opponent. The battle chant is started by the entire army, beginning with shields held to their mouths, murmuring softly, rebounding off the shield, and then escalating to a loud thundering.

It begins with a faint hum, gradually intensifying, like the roaring of the ocean waves crashing against cliffs.

— Ammianus Marcellinus 16,12,43

The tone rises from low to high notes. According to Tacitus's description, it is a song-like battle cry with substance. Tacitus links this battle cry to a religious connection with Hercules. Following the Roman interpretation, "Hercules" can be associated with Donar/Thor. Depending on the strength of the Barritus, it either startles and frightens the opponent while igniting one's own courage or reveals weakness and a lack of self-assurance. The troops made predictions on the outcome of the battle based on the nature of the Barritus.

The technique of Barritus later became popular among Germanic auxiliary troops in the Roman Army. In the 4th century, Ammianus Marcellinus describes Barritus as typical for Germanic auxiliary troops. Vegetius, also in the 4th century, describes the technique as standard for the Roman Army to initiate the battle. He generally recommends using Barritus just before the clash of battle lines, as an early Barritus would miss its effect. According to descriptions by Ammianus Marcellinus and Flavius Vegetius Renatus, it seems that in the 4th century, Barritus transformed from a battle cry into a rather simple war chant within the Roman Army.

In the late Roman Army, the Germanic auxiliary troop (Auxilia palatina) known as the Cornuti was famous for their Barritus. The Cornuti are documented from the 4th to the 5th century. Their Barritus comprised both a battle chant and dance steps.

== Literature ==
- Maximilian Ihm: "Barditus" (in German). In: Realencyclopädie der classischen Altertumswissenschaft (RE). Vol. III,1, Stuttgart, 1897, col. 10 f.
