= Romands =

Gallo-Romance ethnic group of Switzerland

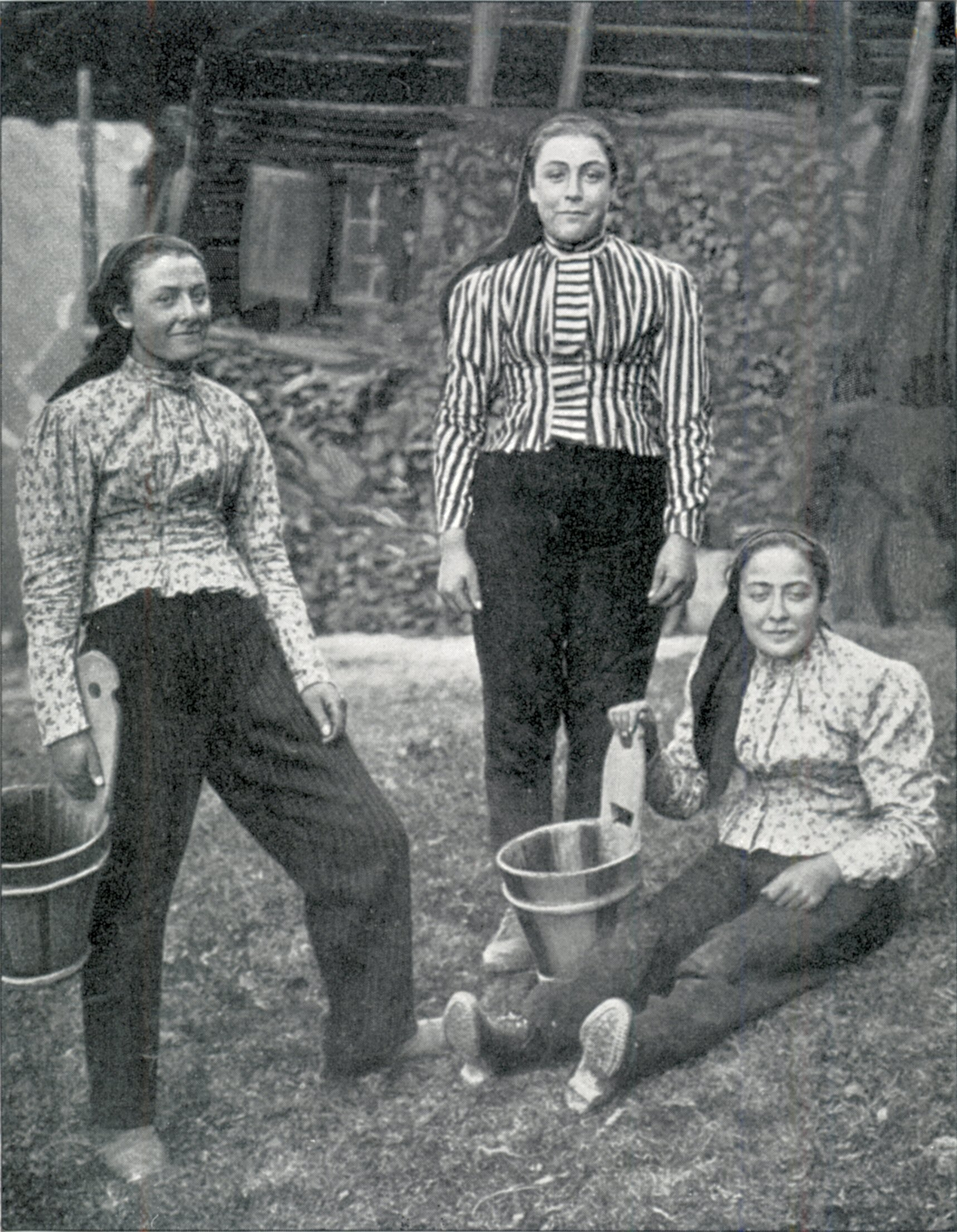
- Farmers of Champery, Valais (1904)

Regions with significant populations
- Romandy

Languages
- Swiss French, Franco-Provençal, Frainc-Comtou

Religion
- Calvinism, Catholicism

Related ethnic groups
- Other Swiss, French, Normans, Walloons, Québécois, Acadians

Romands are a Gallo-Romance ethnic group native to Romandy, in western Switzerland. Traditionally they spoke Franco-Provençal, as well as Frainc-Comtou in Canton of Jura. These languages have since fallen into disuse in favor of the standard French language. The Romands descend largely from the Gallo-Romans and the Burgundians. They are referred to by Swiss Germans as Welsche.
