= Roman funerary art =

Historical Roman art genre

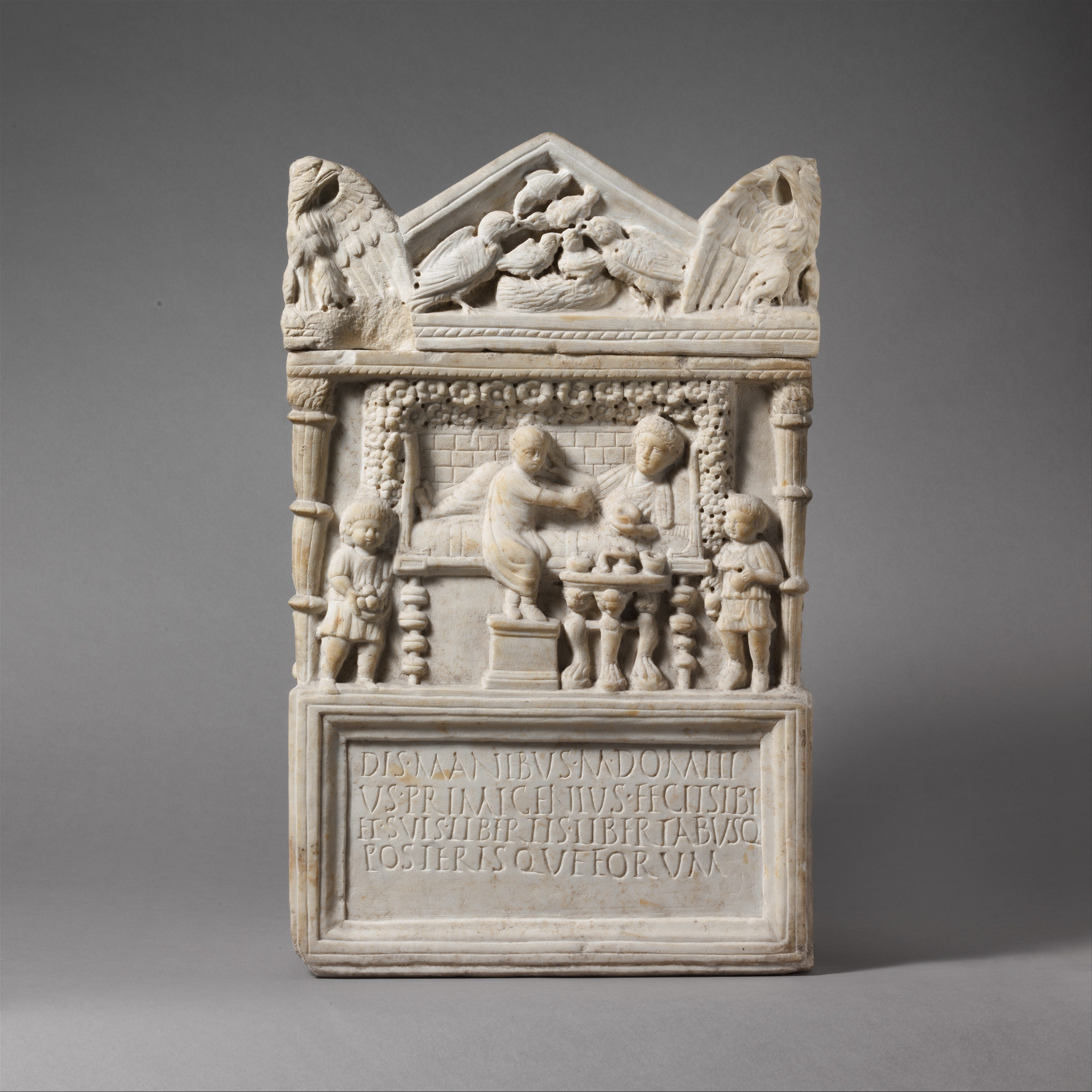
Marble cinerary chest (90–110 AD), made by Marcus Domitius Primigenius "for himself, his freedmen and freedwomen, and their descendants": the deceased makes an offering to a reclining female figure who may be Mother Earth, with two attendants holding food and wine (Metropolitan Museum of Art)

The funerary art of ancient Rome changed throughout the course of the Roman Republic and the Empire and took many different forms. There were two main burial practices used by the Romans throughout history, one being cremation, another inhumation. The vessels used for these practices include sarcophagi, ash chests, urns, and altars. In addition to these, mausoleums, stele, and other monuments were also used to commemorate the dead. The method by which Romans were memorialized was determined by social class, religion, and other factors. While monuments to the dead were constructed within Roman cities, the remains themselves were interred outside the cities.

After the end of Etruscan rule, Roman laws regarding laying the dead to rest became very strict. A major issue was the legality and morality of interring the dead within the city limits. Many Roman towns and provinces had similar rules, often in their charters, such as the Lex Ursonensis. Particularly at the very end of the Republic, exceptions to this principle became more frequent, albeit only for the most powerful leaders. The means used to commemorate the dead served to acknowledge the gods, but also served as means of social expression depicting Roman values and history.

Early Christians continued this custom until Late antiquity, but liked to be buried close to the graves of martyrs. Catacombs and funerary halls, that later became great churches, grew up around the graves of famous martyrs outside the walls of Rome.

== Funerary altars ==
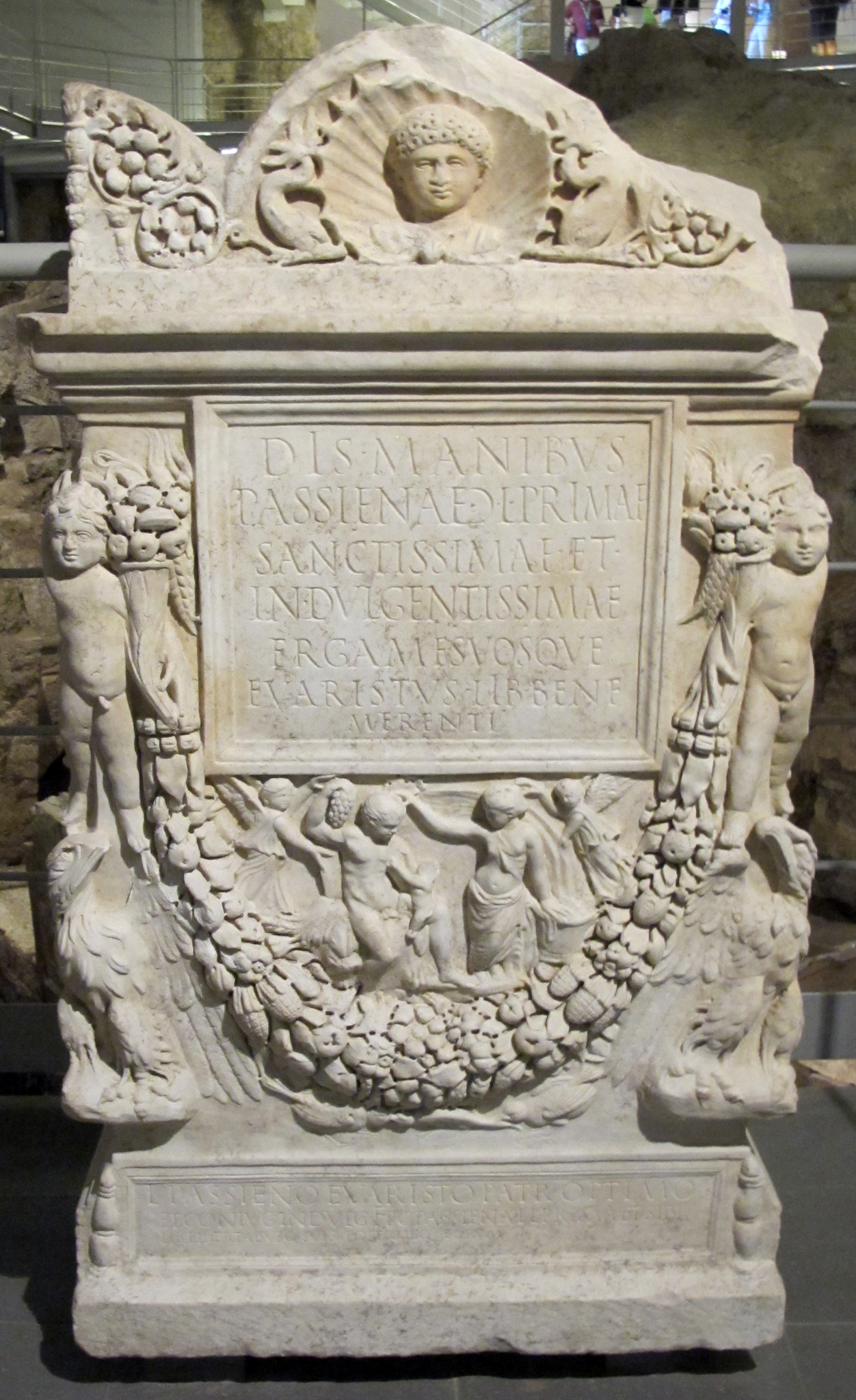
Funerary altar from the Via Triumphalis necropolis (AD 60–70)

In ancient Rome, Roman citizens would memorialize their dead by creating cippi or grave altars. These altars became, not just commissioned by the rich, but also commonly erected by freedmen and slaves. The function of these altars was either to house the ashes of the dead or just to symbolically commemorate the memory of the deceased. Often, practical funerary altars were constructed to display vessels that contained the ashes and burnt bones of the deceased. These ash urns were placed in deep cavities of the altars that were then covered with a lid. Other times, there was a depression in the altar in which libations could be poured. Some Roman funerary altars were provided with pipes so that these libations could "nourish" the remains. Less commonly, the body of the deceased was placed in the altar. While some altars contained remnants of the deceased, most Roman funerary altars had no practical function and only were erected to memorialize the dead.

The practice of erecting Roman funerary altars is linked to the tradition of constructing votive altars to honor the gods. Due to the acceptance that altars act as a symbol of reverence, it is believed that funerary altars were used to heroicize the deceased. Funerary altars differed from votive altars that honored the gods, because they were not recipients of blood sacrifices. Grave altars of heroes were connected with ritual sacrifices, but altars of regular Roman citizens were not. This practical difference is determined because Roman funerary altars do not have sacrificial pans or braziers. By having a similar appearance to votive altars, the symbolism of the reverence of a sacrifice was implied, therefore conveying proper respect to the dead. While having different meanings, the two types of altars were similarly constructed, both aboveground and round or rectangular in shape.

Funerary altars of more wealthy Roman citizens were often found on the interior of more elaborate tombs. Altars erected by the middle class were also set up in or outside of monumental tombs, but also in funerary precincts that lined the roads leading out of the city of Rome. The altars that were part of tomb complexes were set up on family plots or on building plots bought by speculators, who then sold them to individual owners. Tombs and altars had a close connection in the mind of a Roman, evidenced by the Latin inscriptions where tombs are described as if they were altars.

=== Epitaphs ===
Epitaphs on funerary altars provide much information about the deceased, most often including their name and their filiation or tribe. Less often, the age and profession of the deceased was included in the epitaph. A typical epitaph on a Roman funerary altar opens with a dedication to the manes, or the spirit of the dead, and closes with a word of praise for the honoree. These epitaphs, along with the pictorial attributes of the altars, allow historians to discern much important information about ancient Roman funerary practices and monuments. Gathered from the funerary altars, they make it clear that the majority of the altars were erected by a homogeneous group of middle-class citizens.

=== Dedicants and honorees ===
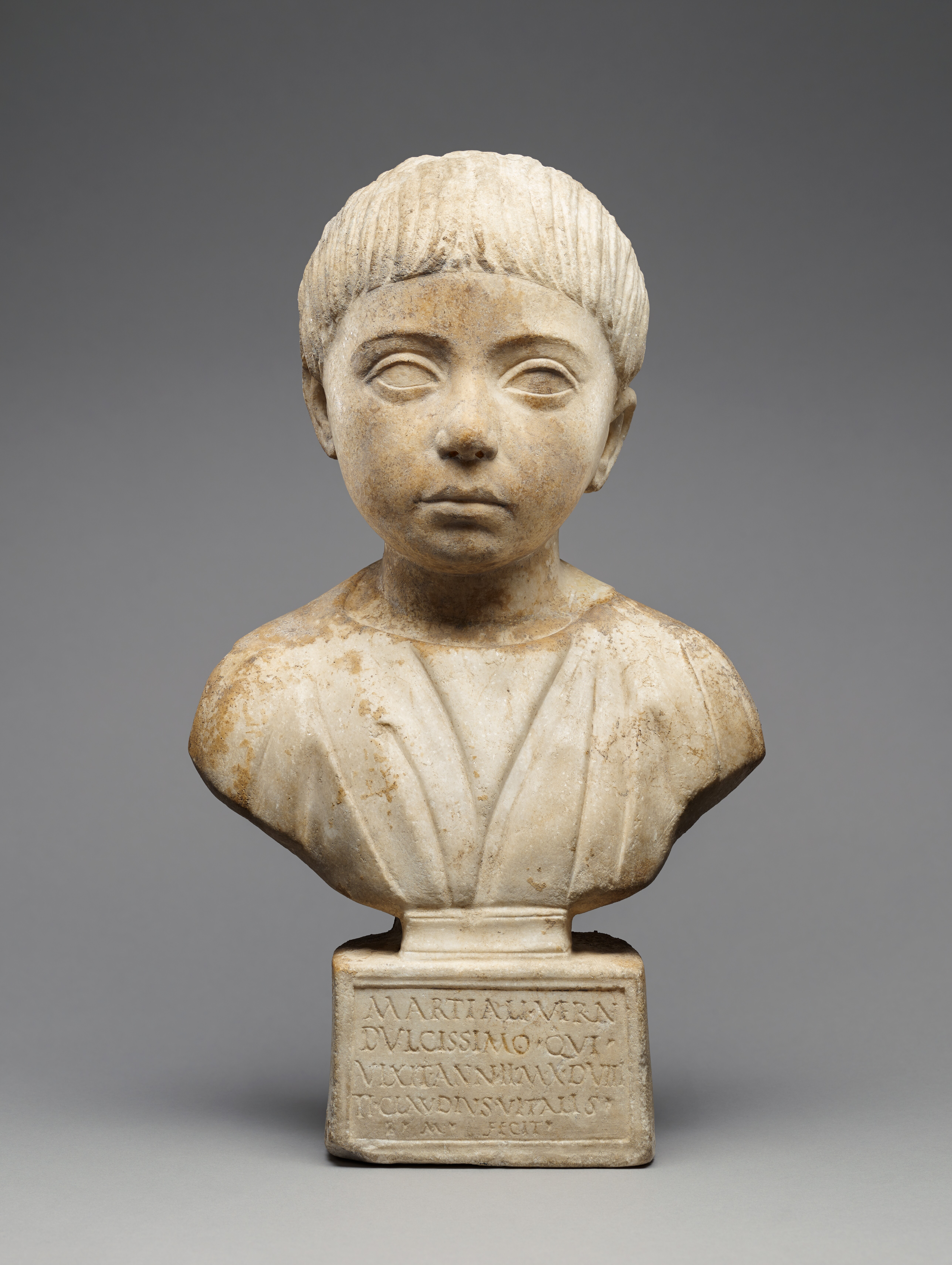
Roman funerary bust (AD 100–115) of a child slave named Martialis, who died just under the age of three (Digital image courtesy of Getty’s Open Content Program)

Epitaphs often emphasize the relationship between the deceased and dedicant, with most relationships being familial (husbands and wives, parents and children, etc.). Many altars also feature portraits of the deceased. Extrapolating from the evidence of epitaphs and portraits on the altars, it can be concluded that freedmen and their descendants most frequently commissioned funerary altars in Rome—people who were teachers, architects, magistrates, writers, musicians and so on.

The most common type of altar dedication is from parents to their deceased child. The epitaph often gives the age of the child to further express grief at the death at such a young age. On the other hand, the age of a deceased person at an older age is rarely put on the epitaph. Some other, less common, dedications are to parents from children, with the child most likely being a boy. The second most common relationship of honorees is husband to wife or wife to husband.

Outside of familial relationships, patrons sometimes dedicated altars to a slave or freedman and vice versa. The relationship between dedicant and honoree of some altars that support this conclusion was actually that of husband and wife, because patrons sometimes married their freed slaves. While the relationship between patron and slave or freedman could include marriage, sometimes these citizens simply had a personal relationship with a non-blood related person that they wanted to commemorate.

In contrast to most of the monuments that survive from Rome, women played a major part in funerary altars, because many altars were erected in honor of or commissioned by a woman. These women were honored as wives, mothers, and daughters, as well remembered for their professions. For example, professional women were honored as priestesses, musicians, and poets. Sometimes the epitaph does not provide information about the profession of the honored woman, but details of the portrait (for example, the dress of the portrait) give clues to her vocation. Many surviving altars honor women because, in ancient Rome, women tended to die young, due to childbirth and general hardships from marriage and overwork. Roman women were often honored by their husbands, with some altars dedicated to the pair and with some just honoring the wife. Furthermore, some female children were honored in altars, commissioned by their grief-stricken parents.

=== Designs ===
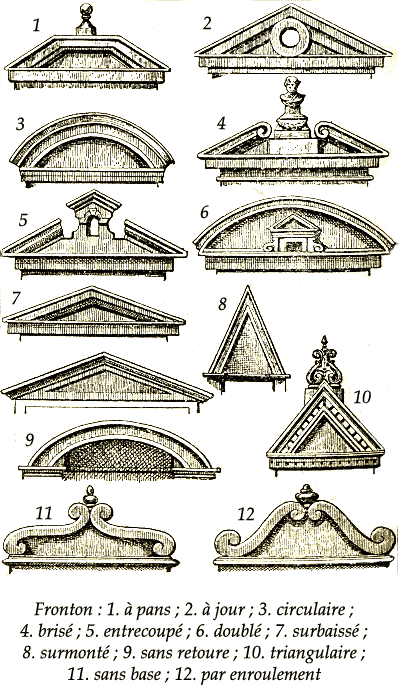
Common varieties of pediments. Some of these forms were found on Roman funerary altars.

Roman funerary altars had varied structures, with most reflecting the erection design of votive altars, which have flat tops. For others, which most likely were designed to receive offerings, the tops of the altars were dished. Deeper cavities were created for ash urns to be placed inside. Sizes of the altars could range from miniature examples to 2 meters tall. Some carried busts or statues or portraits of the deceased. The simplest and most common form of a funerary altar was a base with a pediment, often featuring a portrait or epitaph, on top of the base. They are almost all rectangular in shape and taller than they are wide. Plain or spiral columns usually frame the portrait or scene featured on the altar.

Along with the typical portrait and epitaph, other motifs were inscribed in the altars. These motifs often had otherworldly or funerary meanings, which include laurel wreaths or fruit –swags. Mythological allusions in the design of the altar often aimed to liken the deceased to a divine being. Examples of these allusions include a young girl who is represented in the guise of Daphne transformed into a laurel tree or another girl who is portrayed as the goddess Diana. Sometimes, tools that were characteristic of the deceased's profession were featured on the altar. The design of the Roman funerary altars differs between each individual altar, but there are many overarching themes.

== Sarcophagi ==
"...a stone monument is an expression of permanence. It is no surprise, therefore, that the Roman obsession with personal immortality acquired its physical form in stone."

Sarcophagi were used in Roman funerary art beginning in the second century AD, and continuing until the fourth century. A sarcophagus, which means "flesh-eater" in Greek, is a stone coffin used for inhumation burials. Sarcophagi were commissioned not only for the elite of Roman society (mature male citizens), but also for children, entire families, and beloved wives and mothers. The most expensive sarcophagi were made from marble, but other stones, lead, and wood were used as well. Along with the range in production material, there existed a variety of styles and shapes, depending on where the sarcophagus was produced and whom it was produced for.

=== Before sarcophagi ===
Inhumation burial practices and the use of sarcophagi were not always the favored Roman funerary custom. The Etruscans and Greeks used sarcophagi for centuries before the Romans finally adopted the practice in the second century. Prior to that period, the dead were usually cremated and placed in marble ash chests or ash altars, or were simply commemorated with a grave altar that was not designed to hold cremated remains. Despite being the main funerary custom during the Roman Republic, ash chests and grave altars virtually disappeared from the market only a century after the advent of the sarcophagus.

It is often assumed that the popularity for sarcophagi began with the Roman aristocracy and gradually became more accepted by the lower classes. However, in the past, the most expensive and ostentatious grave altars and ash chests were commissioned more frequently by wealthy freedmen and other members of the emerging middle class than by the Roman elite. Due to this fact and the lack of inscriptions on early sarcophagi, there is not enough evidence to make a judgment on whether or not the fashion for sarcophagi began with a specific social class. Surviving evidence does indicate that a great majority of early sarcophagi were used for children. This suggests that the change in burial practice may not have simply stemmed from a change in fashion, but perhaps from altered burial attitudes. It is possible that the decision to begin inhuming bodies occurred because families believed that inhumation was a kinder, and less disturbing burial rite than cremation, thus necessitating a shift in burial monument.

=== Stylistic transition from altars and ash chests to sarcophagi ===
Although grave altars and ash chests virtually disappeared from the market in the second century, aspects of their decoration endured in some stylistic elements of sarcophagi. The largest stylistic group of early sarcophagi in the second century is garland sarcophagi, a custom of decoration that was previously used on ash chests and grave altars. Though the premise of the decoration is the same, there are some differences. The garland supports are often human figures instead of the animal heads used previously. In addition, specific mythological scenes fill the field, rather than small birds or other minor scenes. The inscription panel on garland ash altars and chests is also missing on garland sarcophagi. When a sarcophagus did have an inscription, it seemed to be an extra addition and usually ran along the top edge of the chest or between the decorations. The fact that early garland sarcophagi continued the tradition of grave altars with decorated garlands suggests that the customers and sculptors of sarcophagi had similar approaches to those who purchased and produced grave altars. Both monuments employed a similar collection of stylistic motifs with only subtle shifts in iconography.

=== Metropolitan Roman, Attic, and Asiatic sarcophagus production centers ===
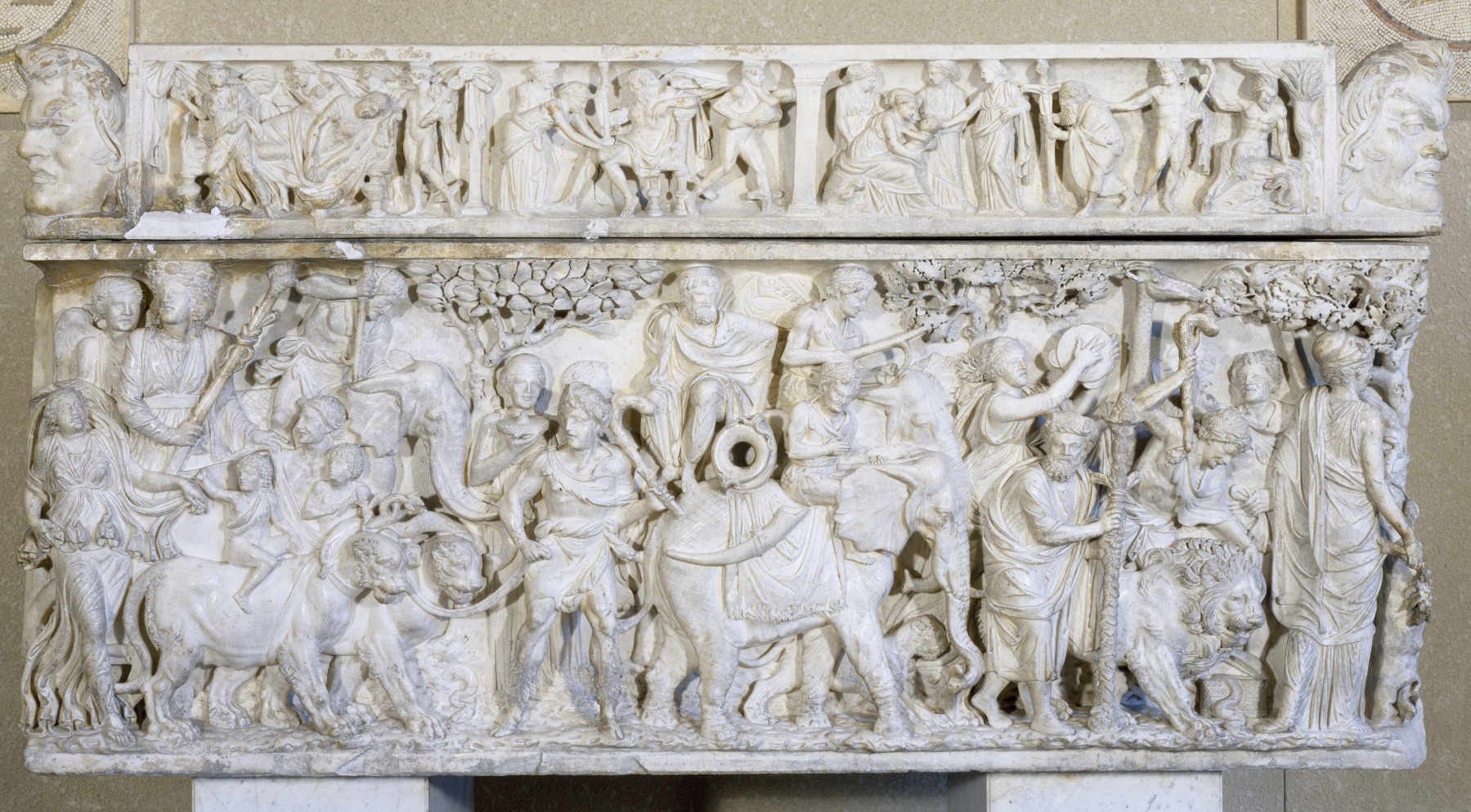
The Sarcophagus with the Triumph of Dionysus is a good example of a Metropolitan Roman style sarcophagus with its flat lid, three-sided decoration, and Dionysian scenes from Greek mythology.

Sarcophagi production of the Ancient Roman Empire involved three main parties: the customer, the sculpting workshop that carved the monument, and the quarry-based workshop that supplied the materials. The distance between these parties was highly variable due to the extensive size of the Empire. Metropolitan Roman, Attic, and Asiatic were the three major regional types of sarcophagi that dominated trade throughout the Roman Empire. Although they were divided into regions, the production of sarcophagi was not as simple as it might appear. For example, Attic workshops were close to Mount Pentelikon, the source of their materials, but were usually very far from their client. The opposite was true for the workshops of Metropolitan Rome, which tended to import large, roughed out sarcophagi from distant quarries in order to complete their commissions. Depending on distance and customer request (some customers might choose to have elements of their sarcophagi left unfinished until a future date, introducing the possibility of further work after the main commission), sarcophagi were in many different stages of production during transport. As a result, it is difficult to develop a standardized model of production.

==== Battle sarcophagi ====
A relatively small number, about 25, of sarcophagi feature large and crowded battle scenes. Most apparently date to 170–210, made in Rome or in some cases Athens. The Ludovisi Battle sarcophagus of about 250-260 is a late outlier, with the Roman commander presumed to be the deceased. In the similar Portonaccio sarcophagus (c. 170) the face of the Roman general is unfinished; perhaps a portrait was awaited.

==== Metropolitan Rome ====
Rome was the primary production center in the western part of the empire. A Metropolitan Roman sarcophagus often took the shape of a low rectangular box with a flat lid. As the sarcophagus was usually placed in a niche or against a wall in a mausoleum, they were usually only decorated on the front and two shorter sides. Many were decorated with carvings of garlands and fruits and leaves, as well as narrative scenes from Greek mythology. Battle and hunting scenes, biographical events from the life of the deceased, portrait busts, the profession of the deceased and abstract designs were also popular.

==== Attic ====
Athens was the main production center for Attic style sarcophagi. These workshops mainly produced sarcophagi for export. They were rectangular in shape and were often decorated on all four sides, unlike the Metropolitan Roman style, with ornamental carvings along the bottom and upper edge of the monument. The lids were also different from the flat metropolitan Roman style and featured a pitched gable roof, or a kline lid, which is carved in the style of couch cushions on which the form of the deceased reclines. The great majority of these sarcophagi also featured mythological subjects, especially the Trojan War, Achilles, and battles with the Amazons.

==== Asia Minor (Asiatic) ====
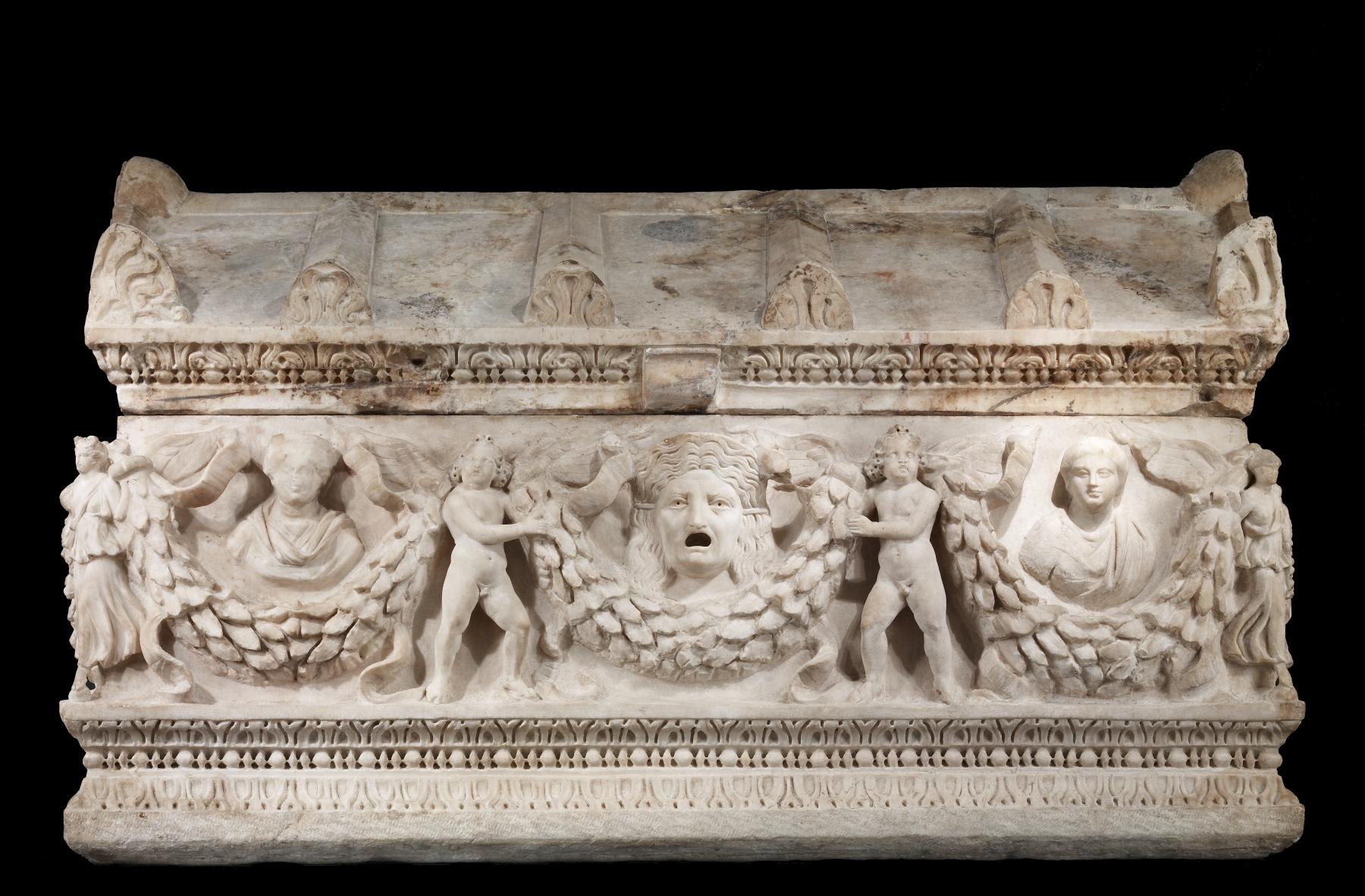
Asiatic garland sarcophagus (150–180 CE) made from Dokimeion marble, likely sculpted in Phrygia and then shipped to Rome, with a gable-roof lid and unfinished portions

The Dokimeion workshops in Phrygia specialized in architecturally formed large-scale Asiatic sarcophagi. Many featured a series of columns joined together by an entablature on all four sides with human figures in the area between the columns. The lids were often made in the gabled-roof design in order to complete the architectural-style sarcophagi so the coffin formed a sort of house or temple for the deceased. Other cities in Asia Minor produced sarcophagi of the garland tradition as well. In general, the sarcophagi were decorated on either three or four sides, depending on whether they were to be displayed on a pedestal in an open-air setting or against the walls inside tombs.

=== Myth and meaning on Ancient Roman sarcophagi ===
A transition from the classical garland and seasonal reliefs with smaller mythological figures to a greater focus on full mythological scenes began with the break up of the classical style in the late second century towards the end of Marcus Aurelius' reign. This shift led to the development of popular themes and meanings portrayed through mythological scenes and allegories. The most popular mythological scenes on Roman sarcophagi functioned as aids to mourning, visions of life and happiness, and opportunities for self-portrayal for Roman citizens. Images of Meleager, the host of the Calydonian Boar hunt, being mourned by Atalanta, as well as images of Achilles mourning Patroclus were very common on sarcophagi that acted as grieving aids. In both cases, the mythological scenes were akin to mourning practices of ordinary Roman citizens in an effort to reflect their grief and comfort them when they visited the tomb. Playful images depicting Nereids, Dionysiac triumphs, and love scenes of Dionysus and Ariadne were also commonly represented on sarcophagi. It is possible that these scenes of happiness and love in the face of death and mourning encouraged the living to enjoy life while they could, and reflected the celebration and meals that the mourners would later enjoy in the tomb when they returned to visit the deceased.

The third century involved the return in popularity of self-representation on Roman sarcophagi. There were several different ways Roman citizens approached self-representation on sarcophagi. Some sarcophagi had actual representations of the face or full figure of the deceased. In other cases, mythological portraits were used to connect characteristics of the deceased with traits of the hero or heroine portrayed. For example, common mythological portraits of deceased women identified them with women of lauded traits in myth, such as the devoted Selene or loyal Alcestis.

Scenes featuring the figures of Meleager and Achilles expressed bravery and were often produced on sarcophagi holding deceased men. Biographical scenes that emphasize the true virtues of Roman citizens were also used to commemorate the deceased. Scholars argue that these biographical scenes as well as the comparisons to mythological characters suggest that self-portrayal on Roman sarcophagi did not exist to celebrate the traits of the deceased, but rather to emphasize favored Roman cultural values and demonstrate that the family of the deceased were educated members of the elite that could understand difficult mythological allegories.

=== Third- and fourth-century sarcophagi ===
The breakup of the classical style led to a period in which full mythological reliefs with an increase in the number of figures and an elongation of forms became more popular, as discussed above. The proportion of figures on the reliefs also became increasingly unbalanced, with the main figures taking up the greatest area with smaller figures crowded in the small pockets of empty space. In the third century, another transition in theme and style of sarcophagi involved the return in popularity of representing mythological and non-mythological portraits of the deceased. Imagery of the four seasons also becomes popular during the third and fourth centuries. With the advent of Christianity in the third century, traditional motifs, like the seasons, remained, and images representing a belief in the afterlife appeared. The change in style brought by Christianity is perhaps most significant, as it signals a change in emphasis on images of retrospection, and introduced images of an afterlife. The Sarcophagus of Junius Bassus is an untypically elaborate example, with narrative Christian scenes.

== Catacombs ==
The Roman catacombs are a series of underground cemeteries that were built in several major cities of the Roman Empire, beginning in the first and second centuries AD. The tradition was later copied in several other cities around the world, though underground burial had been already common in many cultures before Christianity. The word "Catacomb" means a large, underground, Christian cemetery. Because of laws prohibiting burial within the city, the catacombs were constructed around the city along existing roads such as the Via Appia, where San Callixtus and San Sebastiano can be found, two of the most significant catacombs. The catacombs were often named for saints who were buried in them, according to tradition, though at the time of their burial, martyr cults had not yet achieved the popularity to grant them lavish tombs. After 750 AD, most of the remains of these martyrs were moved to the churches in the city above. This was mainly undertaken by Pope Paul I, who decided to move the relics because of the neglected state of the catacombs. The construction of catacombs started late in the first century and during this time they were used only for burial purposes and for funerary rites. The process of underground burial was abandoned, however, in the fifth century. A few catacombs remained open to be used as sites of pilgrimage because of their abundance of relics.

Before Christians began to use catacombs for burial, they buried their dead in pagan burial areas. As a result of their community's economic and organizational growth, Christians were able to begin these exclusively Christian cemeteries. Members of the community created a "communal fund" which ensured that all members would be buried. Christians also insisted on inhumation and the catacombs allowed them to practice this in an organized and practical manner.

=== Types of tombs ===
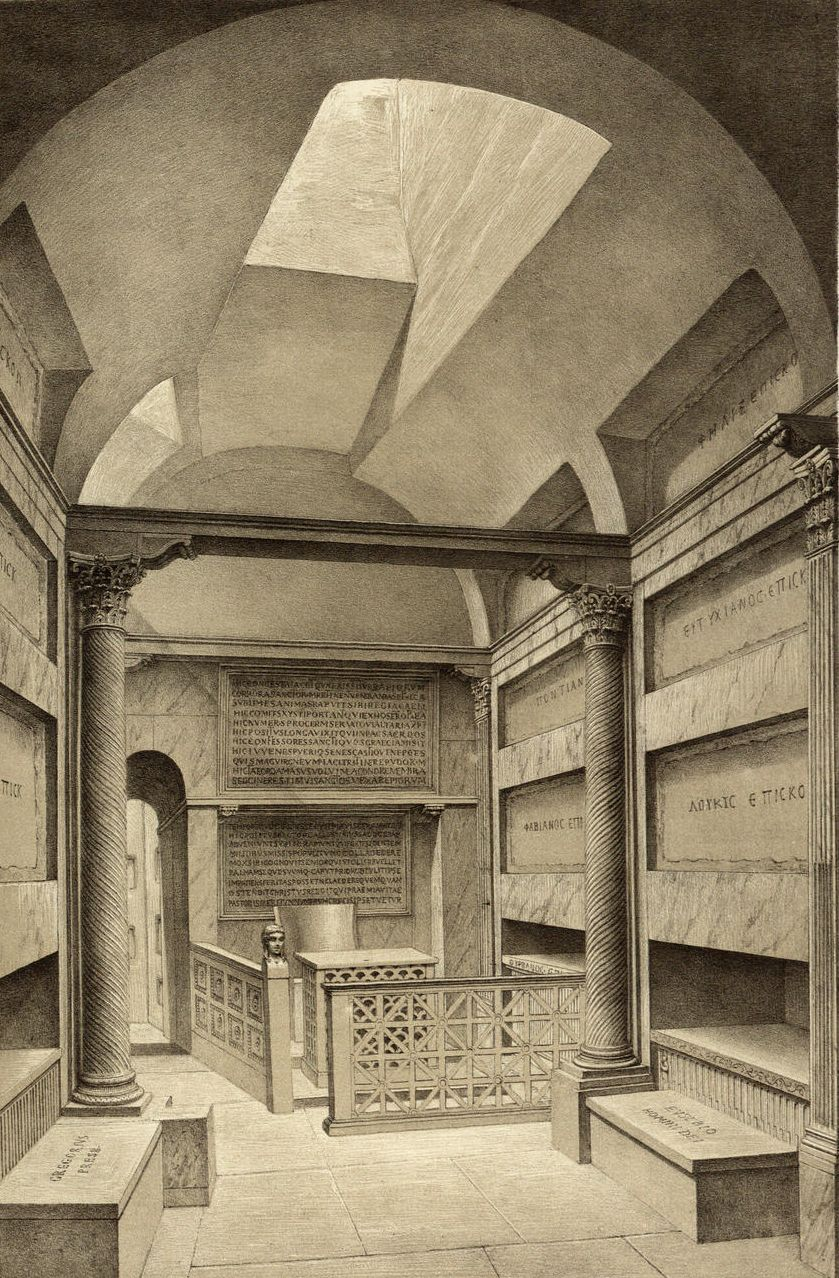
Reconstruction of the Catacomb of Callistus

The layout and architecture was designed to make very efficient use of the space and consisted of several levels with skylights that were positioned both to maximize lighting and to highlight certain elements of the decor. There are several types of tomb in the catacombs, the simplest and most common of which is the loculus (pl. loculi), a cavity in the wall closed off by marble or terra-cotta slabs. These are usually simple and organized very economically, arranged along the walls of the hallways in the catacombs. A mensa is a niche in the wall holding a sarcophagus while a cubiculus is more private, more monumental, and usually more decorated. Cubicula use architectural structures, such as columns, pilasters, and arches, along with bold geometric shapes. Their size and elaborate decor indicate wealthier occupants. With the issuance of the Edict of Milan, as Christians were less persecuted and gained more members of the upper class, the catacombs were greatly expanded and grew more monumental.

=== Types of decor ===
==== Material of tombs ====
Much of the material of the tombs was second-hand, some even still has pagan inscriptions on it from previous use. Marble was used often, partially because it reflected light and was light in color. Clay bricks were the other common material that was used for structure and for decor. Roman concrete (volcanic rock, lime putty, and water – a combination which is incredibly resistant to wear) and a thin layer of stucco was spread over the walls of bare rock faces. This was not structural, only aesthetic, and was typically painted with frescoes.

==== Inscriptions ====
Tombs were usually marked with epitaphs, seals, Christian symbols, or prayers in the form of an inscription or painted in red lead, though often they were marked only with the name of the occupant. Inscriptions in the Christian catacombs were usually in Latin or Greek, while in the Jewish catacombs they were written in either Greek or Hebrew. The majority of them are religiously neutral, while some are only graphic imitations of epitaphs (dashes and letters) that serve no meaning but to continue the funerary theme in an anonymous and efficient mass-production. Textual inscriptions also contained graphic elements and were matched in size and significance with decorative elements and elaborate punctuations marks. Some Christians were too poor to afford inscriptions, but could inscribe their tomb with a short and somewhat sloppy graffito while the mortar was still drying; Eventually, a code of equality was established ensuring that the tombs of poorer Christians would still be decorated, however minimally. The quality of writing on pagan tombstones is noticeably superior to that on Christian tombstones. This was probably due to the fact that Christians had less means, less access to specialized workers, and perhaps cared more about the content of their inscriptions than their aesthetic value.

==== Objects ====
Objects were often set before, in, and in the mortar of tombs. These took the form of benches, stools, tables, and tableware and may have been used for rites such as the refrigerium (the funerary meal) which involved real food and drink. Tables most likely held offerings of food while vases or other glass or ceramic containers held offerings of wine. Objects such as the bases of gold glass beakers, shells, dolls, buttons, jewelry, bells, and coins were added to the mortar of the loculi or left on shelves near the tomb. Some of these objects may have been encased in the tomb with the body and removed later. Objects were much more common during and after the Constantinian period.

==== Frescoes ====
The objects surrounding the tomb were reflected in the frescoes of banquets. The tombs sometimes used mosaics, but frescoes were overwhelmingly more popular than mosaics. The walls were typically whitewashed and divided up into sections by red and green lines. This shows influence from Pompeian wall painting which tends toward extreme simplification of architectural imitation.

"The Severan period sees the definition of the wall surface as a chromatic unity, no longer intended as a space open towards an illusionary depth, but rather as a solid and substantial surface to be articulated with panels."

=== Symbolism ===
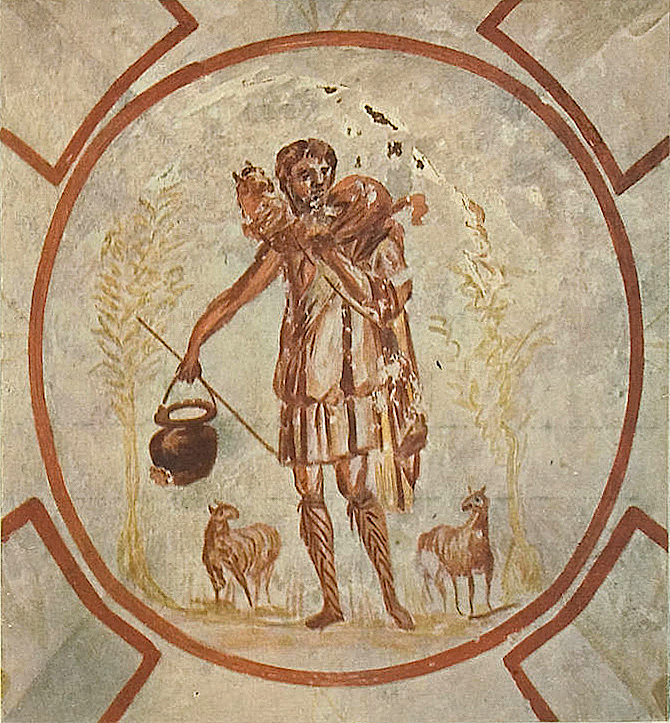
Jesus as the Good Shepherd

The organized and simple style of the frescoes manifests itself in two forms: an imitation of architecture, and clearly defined images. The images typically present one subject of religious importance and are combined together to tell a familiar (typically Christian) story. Floral motif and the Herculean labors (often used in pagan funerary monuments) along with other Hellenistic imagery are common and merge in their depictions of nature with Christian ideas of Eden. Similarly, seasons are a common theme and represent the journey through life from birth (spring) to death (winter), which goes with the occasional depictions of the Goddesses Ceres and Proserpina. There are many examples of pagan symbolism in the Christian catacombs, often used as parallels to Christian stories. The phoenix, a pagan symbol, is used to symbolize the Resurrection; Hercules in the Garden of Hesperides symbolizes Adam, Eve, and the Serpent in the garden of Eden; the most famous symbol of the catacombs, the Good Shepherd is sometimes shown as Christ, but sometimes as the Greek figure Orpheus.

Most usage of pagan imagery is to emphasize paradisial aspects, though it may also indicate that either the patron or the artist was pagan. Other symbols include historical martyrs, funerary banquets, and symbols of the occupation of the deceased. The most popular symbols are of the Jonah cycle, the Baptism of Christ, and the Good Shepherd and the fisherman. The Good Shepherd was used as a wish for peaceful rest for the dead, but also acted as a guide to the dead who were represented by the sheep. Sometimes the Good Shepherd was depicted with the fisherman and the philosopher as the symbol of ultimate "peace on land and sea," though this is only briefly popular. These Old Testament scenes are also seen in Jewish catacombs.

== Tombstones and funerary inscriptions ==
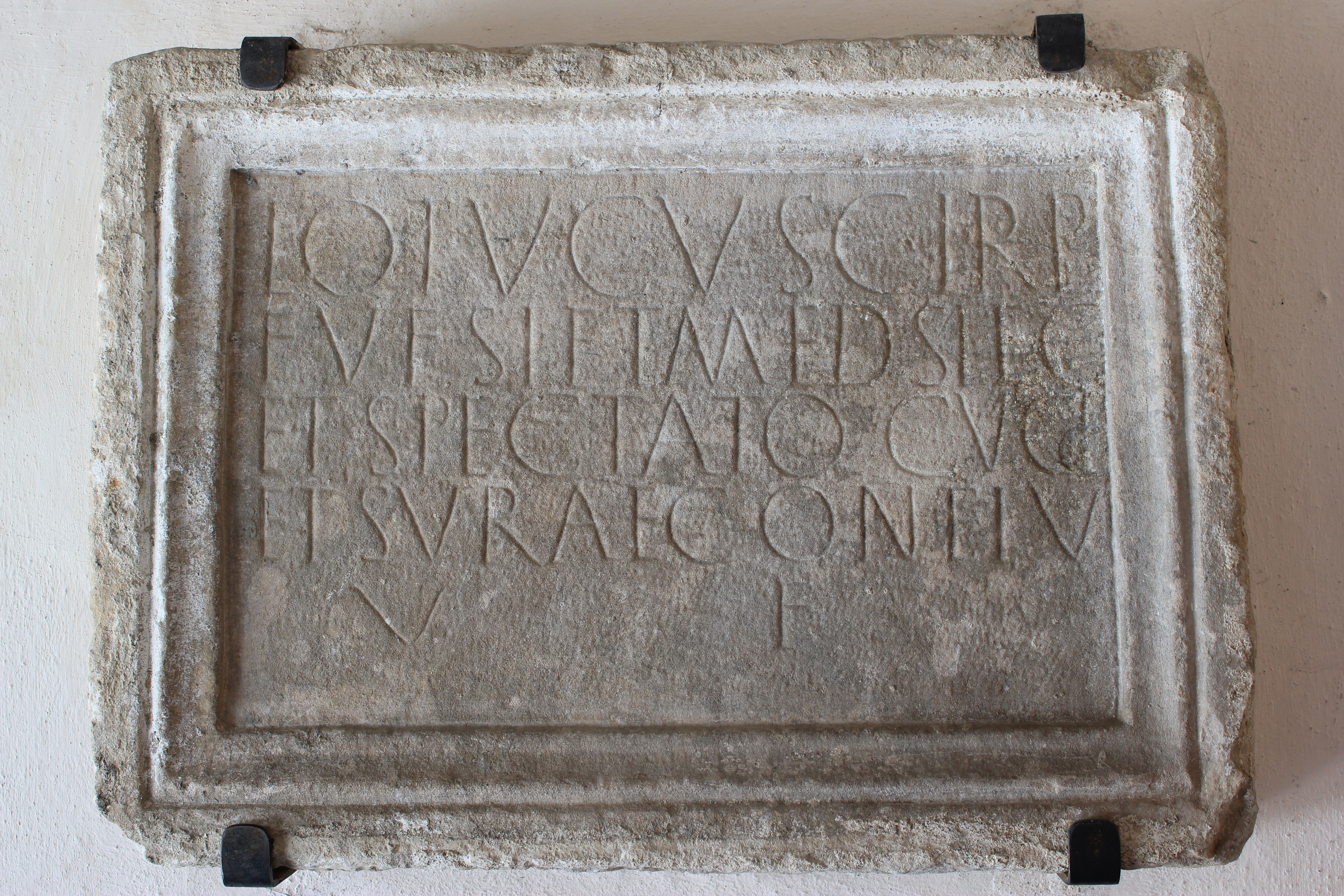
Roman epitaph from Church in Sankt Stefan in the community of Völkermarkt

Culturally significant throughout the Empire, the erection and dedication of funerary tombstones was a common and accessible burial practice. As in modern times, epitaphs were a means of publicly showcasing one's wealth, honor, and status in society. In this way, tombstones not only served to commemorate the dead, but also to reflect the sophistication of the Roman world. Both parties, therefore – the living and the dead – were venerated by and benefited from public burial. Though Roman tombstones varied in size, shape, and style, the epitaphs inscribed upon them were largely uniform. Traditionally, these inscriptions included a prayer to the Manes, the name and age of the deceased, and the name of the commemorator. Some funerary inscriptions, though rare, included the year, month, day, and even hour of death. The design and layout of the epitaph itself would have often been left to the discretion of a hired stonemason. In some cases, the stonemason would have even chosen the inscription, choosing a common phrase to complement the biographical information provided by the family of the deceased. In death, one had the opportunity to idealize and romanticize their accomplishments; consequently, some funerary inscriptions can be misleading. Tombstones and epitaphs, therefore, should not be viewed as an accurate depiction of the Roman demographic.

=== Freedmen and their children ===
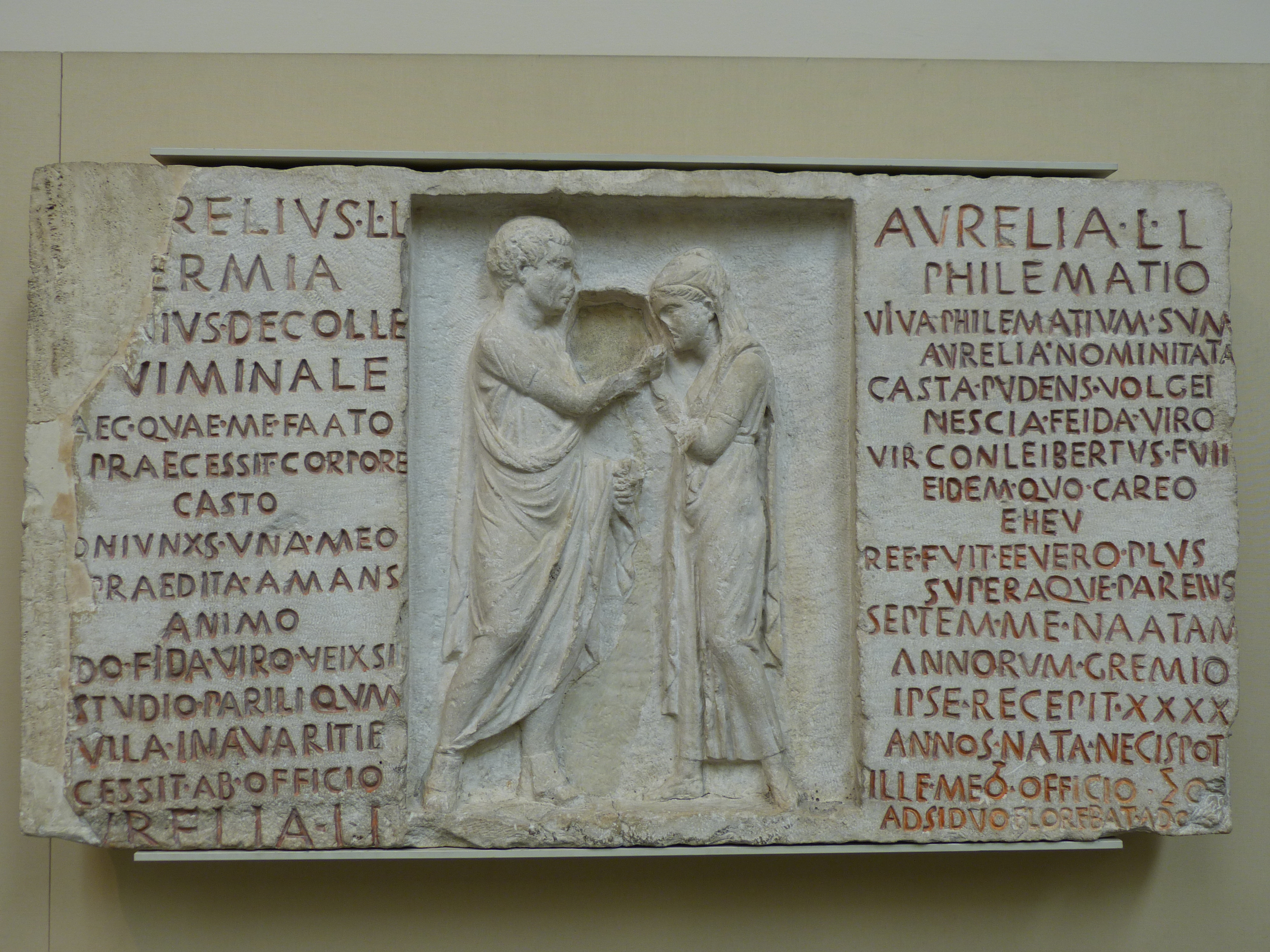
An inscribed funerary relief of Aurelius Hermia and his wife Aurelia Philematum, former slaves who married after their manumission, 80 BC, from a tomb along the Via Nomentana in Rome

In the Roman world, infant mortality was common and widespread throughout the Empire. Consequently, parents often remained emotionally detached from young children, so as to prevent or lessen future grief. Nonetheless, tombstones and epitaphs dedicated to infants were common among freedmen. Of the surviving collection of Roman tombstones, roughly 75 percent were made by and for freedmen and slaves. Regardless of class, tombstones functioned as a symbol of rank and were chiefly popular among those of servile origin. As public displays, tombstones were a means of attaining social recognition and asserting one's rise from slavery. Moreover, tombstones promoted the liberties of freeborn sons and daughters who, unlike their freed parents, were Roman citizens by birth. The child's tria nomina, which served to show that the child was dignified and truly Roman, was typically inscribed upon the tombstone. Infants additionally had one or two epithets inscribed upon the stone that emphasized the moral aspects of the child's life. These epithets served to express the fact that even young children were governed by Roman virtues.

=== Social elite ===
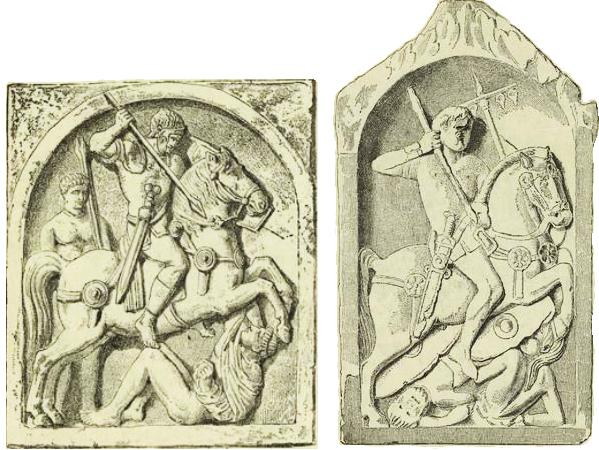
Tombstones of Roman horsemen

Members of the ruling class became interested in erecting funerary monuments during the Augustan-Tiberian period. Yet, by and large, this interest was brief. Whereas freedmen were often compelled to display their success and social mobility through the erection of public monuments, the elite felt little need for an open demonstration of this kind. Archeological findings in Pompeii suggest that tombs and monuments erected by freedmen increased at the very moment when those erected by the elite began to decrease. This change in custom signifies a restoration of pre-Augustan minimalism and austerity among the aristocracy in Rome. Self-remembrance among the social elite became uncommon during this time. Nonetheless governed by a strong sense of duty and religious piety, however, ancient Romans chose to celebrate the dead privately. With this change, noble or aristocratic families took to commemorating the deceased by adding inscriptions or simple headstones to existing burial sites. These sites, which were often located on the family's country estate, offered privacy to a grieving household. Unlike freedmen, the Roman elite rarely used tombstones or other funerary monuments as indicators of social status. The size and style of one's cippi, for example, was largely a personal choice and not something influenced by the need to fulfill greater social obligations.

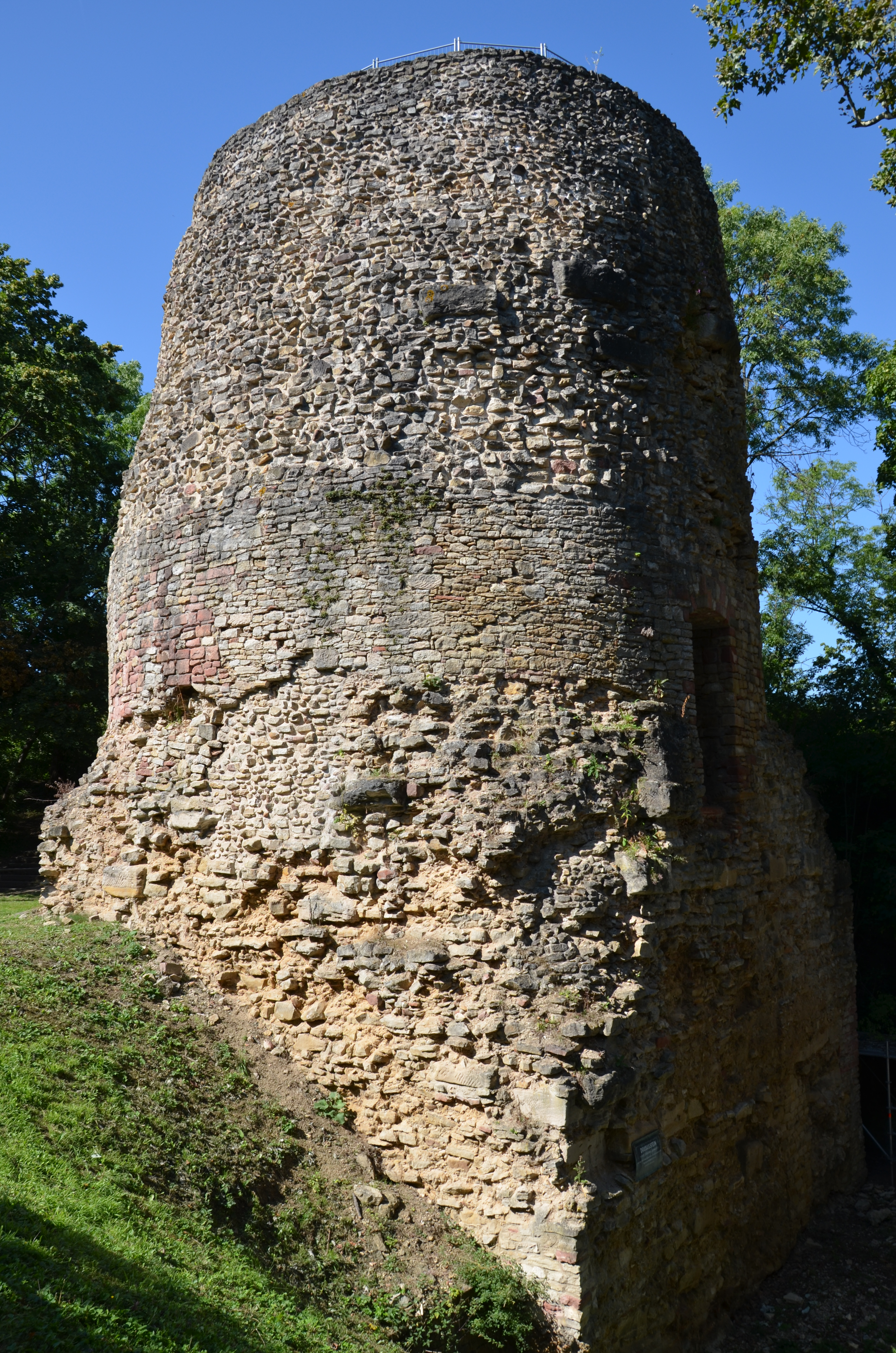
The Cenotaph of Drusus, an empty tomb raised by Roman troops in 9 AD to commemorate the deceased general Drusus

=== Soldiers ===
In a military context, burial sites served to honor fallen soldiers as well as to mark newly sequestered Roman territory, such as Mainz. The most common funerary monument for Roman soldiers was that of the stele – a humble, unadorned piece of stone, cut into the shape of a rectangle. The name, rank, and unit of the deceased would be inscribed upon the stone, as well as his age and his years of service in the Roman army. The name of the commemorator, usually an heir or close family member, could be inscribed near the bottom of the stele if desired. Uniform in nature, the consistent style of these tombstones reflected the orderly, systematic nature of the army itself. Each tombstone stood as a testament to the strength and persistence of the Roman army as well as the individual soldiers. In some unique cases, military tombstones were adorned with sculpture. These types of headstones typically belonged to members of the auxiliary units rather than legionary units. The chief difference between the two units was citizenship.

Whereas legionary soldiers were citizens of Rome, auxiliary soldiers came from provinces in the Empire. Auxiliary soldiers had the opportunity to obtain Roman citizenship only after their discharge. Tombstones served to distinguish Romans from non-romans, and to enforce the social-hierarchy that existed within military legions. For men who died in battle, the erection of ornate tombstones was a final attempt at Romanization. Reliefs on auxiliary tombstones often depict men on horseback, denoting the courage and heroism of the auxiliary's cavalrymen. Though expensive, tombstones were likely within the means of the common soldier. Unlike most lower class citizens in ancient Rome, soldiers received a regular income. Moreover, some historians suggest the creation of a burial club, a group organized to collect regular monetary contributions from the legions. The proceeds served to subsidize the cost of burial for fallen soldiers. Countless soldiers died in times of Roman war. Tombstones, therefore, were a way to identify and honor one's military service and personal achievement on the battlefield. These tombstones did not commemorate soldiers who died in combat, but rather soldiers who died during times of peace when generals and comrades were at ease to hold proper burials. Soldiers who died in battle were disrobed, cremated, and buried in mass graves near camp. In some cases, heirs or other family members commissioned the construction of cenotaphs for lost soldiers – funerary monuments that commemorated the dead as if the body had been found and returned home.

== Mausolea ==
The mausoleum is so named for Mausolus of Caria (377–353/2 BC). Mausolea generally had multiple occupants because their space was so vast, although this practise took time to become common in the Early Republic, as did the idea of "burying" the dead above ground. Mass burials were common, but only for the common people. Royalty, politicians, generals, and the richest citizens originally would have shared a tomb wonly with immediate family. Changes were gradual largely because funerary practices tended to follow strict traditions, especially in the ancient world. It took centuries to develop the "Roman" concept of the mausoleum. Meanwhile, the practise of lavish decoration of burial sites remained throughout the Republic and the Empire. The above ground structures of the Empire and Late Republic contained art suitable for the lives of the occupants as with their underground alternatives.

Few mausolea inside the pomerium predate the Empire. Most mausolea existed on designated burial grounds in the country, though city exemptions to the prohibition of mortuary buildings only increased during the Empire. It was also popular to build them along main roads so that they would be consistently visible to the public. A trend of the Middle and Late Empire was to build mausolea on family property, even if it was within the city limits.

=== History ===
The Romans absorbed a great deal of Etruscan funerary art practices. Above ground mausolea were still rare; underground tombs and tumuli were far more common methods of burial. The early Romans buried those who could not afford such accommodations in mass graves or cremated them. Of the few mausolea that they did build during Rome's infancy, many fell to ruins under unknown circumstances. Their absence thus renders little indication of the Romans' mausoleum practices during these years. A notable exception is in Praeneste, or present day Palestrina, where approximately forty early mausolea remain.

Etruscan influence continued into the early Republic, and there became more consistency in the styles of mausolea as Roman influence increased throughout the Latin League. Structures from this era are rare, but as with the preceding centuries, most of those that the Romans built at this time no longer exist.

==== Mid Republic ====
Rome, along with the rest of the Mediterranean world, experienced a resurgence of Greek culture, known as the Hellenistic period. Both the interiors and exteriors of mausolea adopted elements of Classical architecture such as barrel vaulted roofs; klinai, which were full body benches upon which the dead lay; painted facades; ornate columns; and friezes along the roofs. During this era, most Romans acknowledged the idea that above ground burial would allow the public to better remember the deceased. Clearly in accordance with their embrace of tradition and virtues of the mos maiorum, Romans began to set aside money to build vast new mausolea for the preservation of their legacies. Of course, this trend was gradual, but had gained ground by the end of the Republic.

The Tomb of the Scipios is an example of a large underground rock-cut set of chambers; it was used by the Scipio family from the 3rd to the 1st centuries BC. Although grand it was fairly inconspicuous above ground.

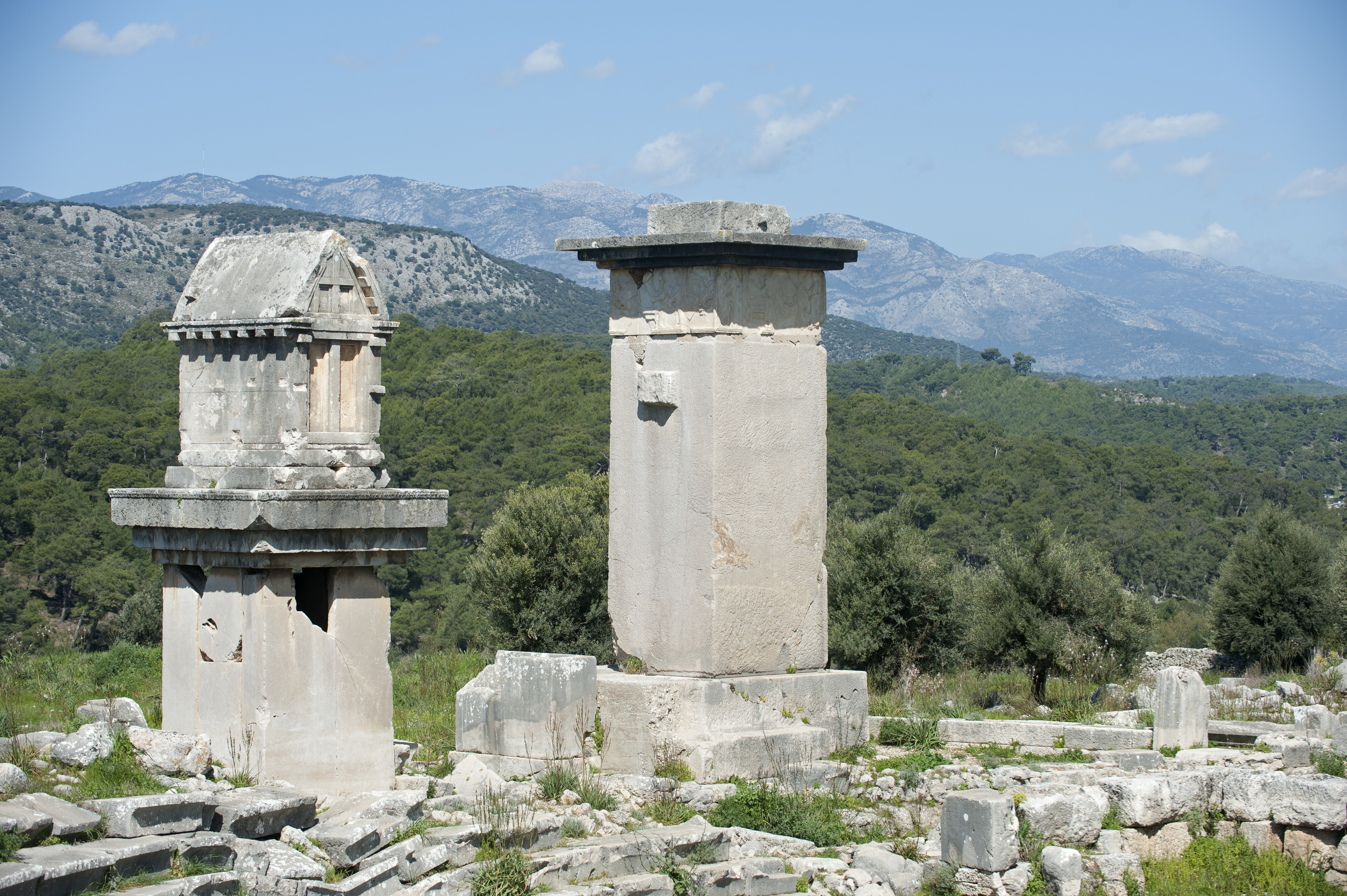
The Harpy Tomb and the pillared sarcophagus of Xanthos

Also present was an influence from the lands east of Greece. Although the architectural contributions of Asia Minor were very different from those of the Greeks, Asia Minor had previously opened itself to Hellenic styles earlier in the fourth century BC. The Romans borrowed most of their architecture during these years from the Greeks, so most of the Roman styles similar to those of Asia Minor actually came to Rome via Greece. Of course, the Romans borrowed directly from the Greek style as well. Anatolian mausolea are distinct via their tower designs, a notable example being the Harpy Tomb, built circa 480–470 BC.

Approaching the Late Republic, the new diversity in design allowed those who could afford it to build larger and more lavish mausolea. Although politicians, particularly senators, had always used their monuments to proclaim their status, they increasingly saw the grandeur of their mausolea as an additional outlet for expressing political dominance. Around this time, most Romans had accepted the similarities of mausolea and temples, although their ancestors had been conscious of this apparent analogue for centuries.

==== Late Republic ====
During the final two centuries of the Republic, Roman mausolea acquired inspiration from another geographical region: North Africa. North African architecture itself had succumbed to Greek practices since Greco-Phoenician trade settlements since the eighth century BC. Again, the Romans embraced the style as they solidified their conquest of North Africa in the second and first centuries BC. By the time of Augustus, the influences of Greece, Asia Minor, and Africa combined to make a unique "Roman" style.

As the Republic ended, more people continued to get around the rules against city burials. One of the last Republican leaders to do so was Sulla, who opted to build a mausoleum on the Campus Martius. Many burial grounds outside of the city became crowded because mausolea had increased in size, ornateness, and quantity since the Hellenistic Era. In the first century BC, some Romans settled for smaller and simpler mausolea in order to just reserve space on a prominent burial ground, such as the Isola Sacra Necropolis outside of Portus, where visitors can notice the smaller mausolea desperately filling random space around the more properly distanced larger ones. Howard Colvin cites the mausolea of the consul Minicius Fundanus on Monte Mario and the Licinii-Calpurnii on Via Salaria as examples of more compact structures that came to scatter burial sites.

The Tomb of Eurysaces the Baker (50–20 BC) is a flamboyant example of a rich freedman's tomb, with reliefs exemplifying an Italic style less influenced by Hellenistic art than official or patrician monuments.

==== Early Empire ====
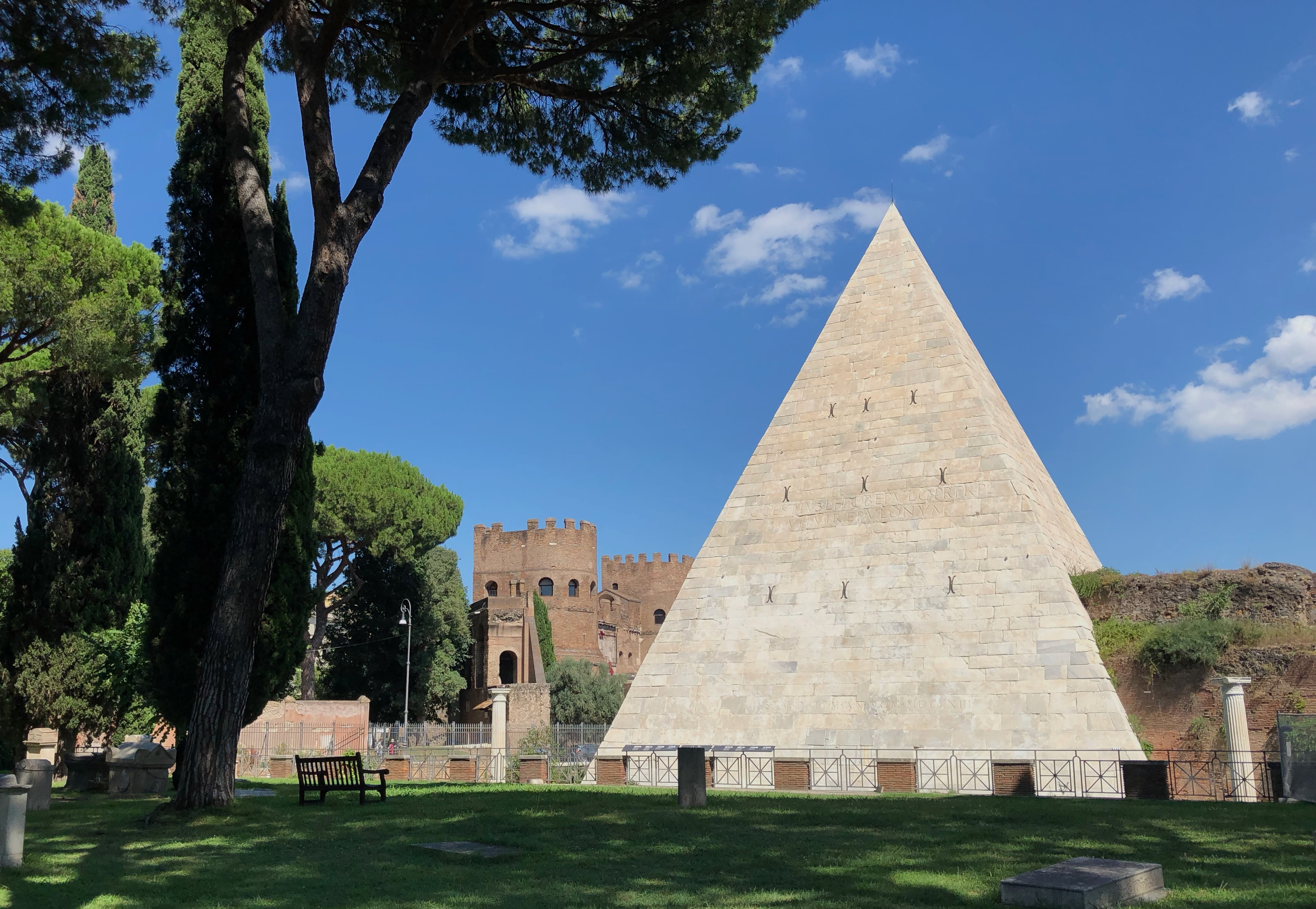
The Pyramid of Cestius, a pyramid shaped tomb in the city of Rome

The new government of Rome brought a new approach to mausolea, politically and socially. The non-elite became more prominent in the Senate, curbing many of the longtime rivalries of the aristocracy. Because many of these men were homines novi, or new men, they had other incentives to assert dominance; Patterson observes that their mausolea focused more upon giving prestige to their own name rather than toppling that of someone else. Such an agenda is discernible through the increased interest in building mausolea on family property. Many wealthy families owned magnificent estates in the country, where they were free from the burial laws of the city. While the art and design of the structures themselves remained grandiose, builders shifted interest to decorating the land around the mausoleum. Statues, podia, steles, and horti (gardens), gained popularity amongst those who had the space and money to erect mausolea on their own property. The Pyramid of Cestius of about 12 BC remains a rather eccentric Roman landmark; he had perhaps served in Nubian campaigns.

With the advent of the Empire there was an increase in the inclusivity of mausolea in two ways. Firstly, the number of occupants of many new mausolea was greater than that of their Republican predecessors, which generally reserved space for nobody other than their immediate family. Many in the Empire who commissioned mausolea in their name also requested room for extended family, slaves, freedmen, concubines, clients, animals, and other intimate acquaintances. Secondly, more people could afford a mausoleum. Aside from those a master invited to his mausoleum, certain freedmen received their own mausolea with financial assistance from their former masters. Some of the freedmen's mausolea are equally as impressive as those of wealthy citizens.

==== Late Empire ====
Around the end of the second century AD Rome reached its maximum territorial extent. The initially slow, but quickly hastening decline of the Empire allowed the mausoleum to fall into the hands of Roman constituents and enemies. Notably, after the Crisis of the Third Century, the revival of the mausoleum during the Tetrarchy and beyond spawned interest amongst the Christian population. They began to build mausolea in the same style as the Romans had done for the duration of the Empire, and decorated them with Christian artwork. Mausolea continued to be a prime means of interring multiple individuals in the Middle Ages.

The Mausoleum of Helena in Rome, built by Constantine I for himself, but later used for his mother, retains a traditional form, but the church of Santa Costanza, built as a mausoleum for Constantine's daughter, was built over an important catacomb where Saint Agnes was buried, and either was always intended, or soon developed into, a funerary hall where burial spots could be bought by Christians. Most of the great Christian basilicas in Rome passed through a stage as funerary halls, full of sarcophagi and slab memorials, before being turned into more conventional churches in the Early Middle Ages.

=== Notable Mausolea of Emperors ===
==== Augustus ====
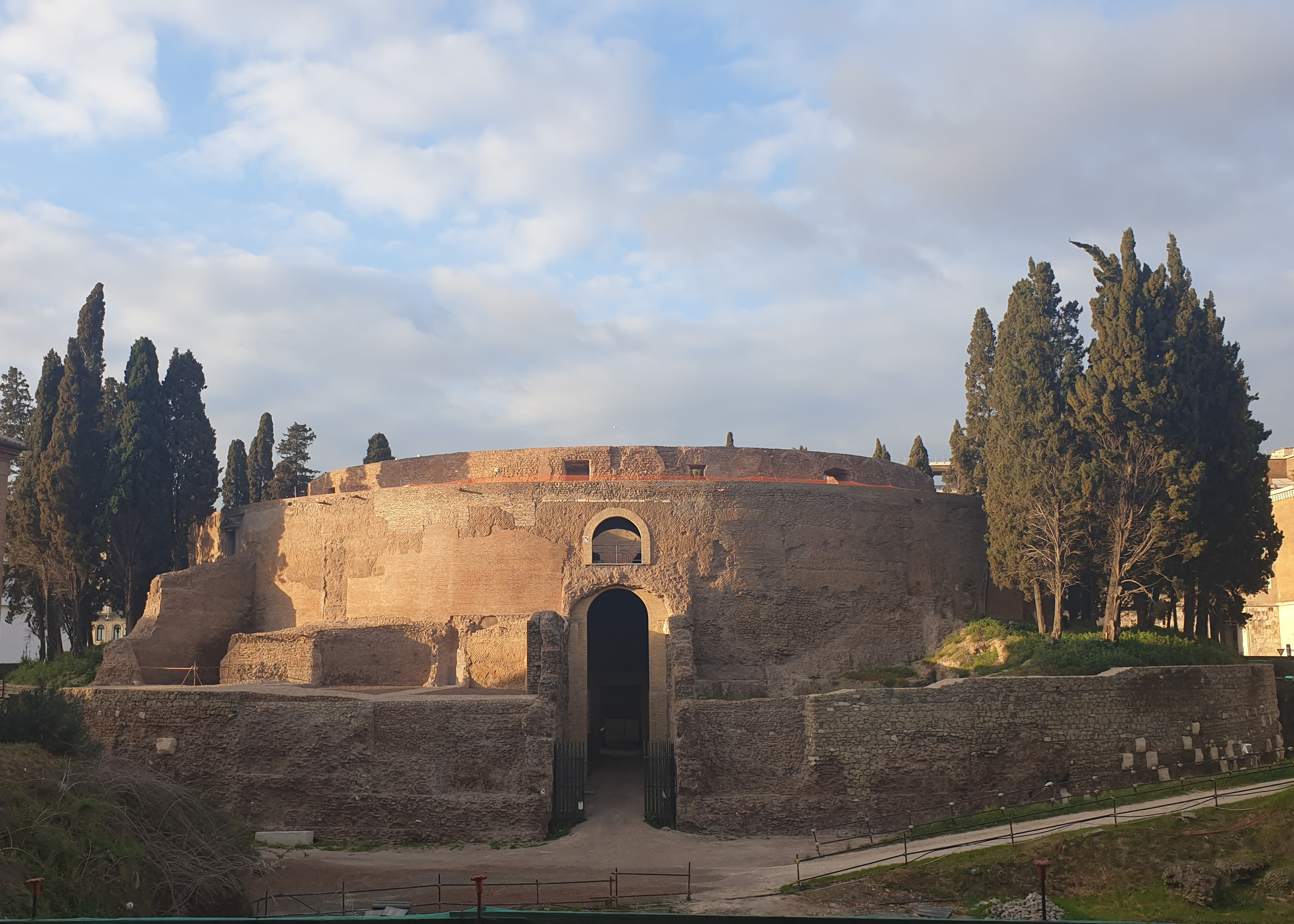
Mausoleum of Augustus restored (2019)

In 28 BC Augustus controversially and erected a mausoleum on the Campus Martius, a previously public space on which building was normally illegal. This challenged his claim to be princeps, since his enemies found this action to be too ambitious for a regular citizen and thus above the law. Notable features of the mausoleum included a bronze statue of Augustus, pyres, and Egyptian obelisks among the various usual mortuary ornaments. The mausoleum suffered severe damage in 410 AD during the Gothic invasion of Rome.

==== Hadrian ====
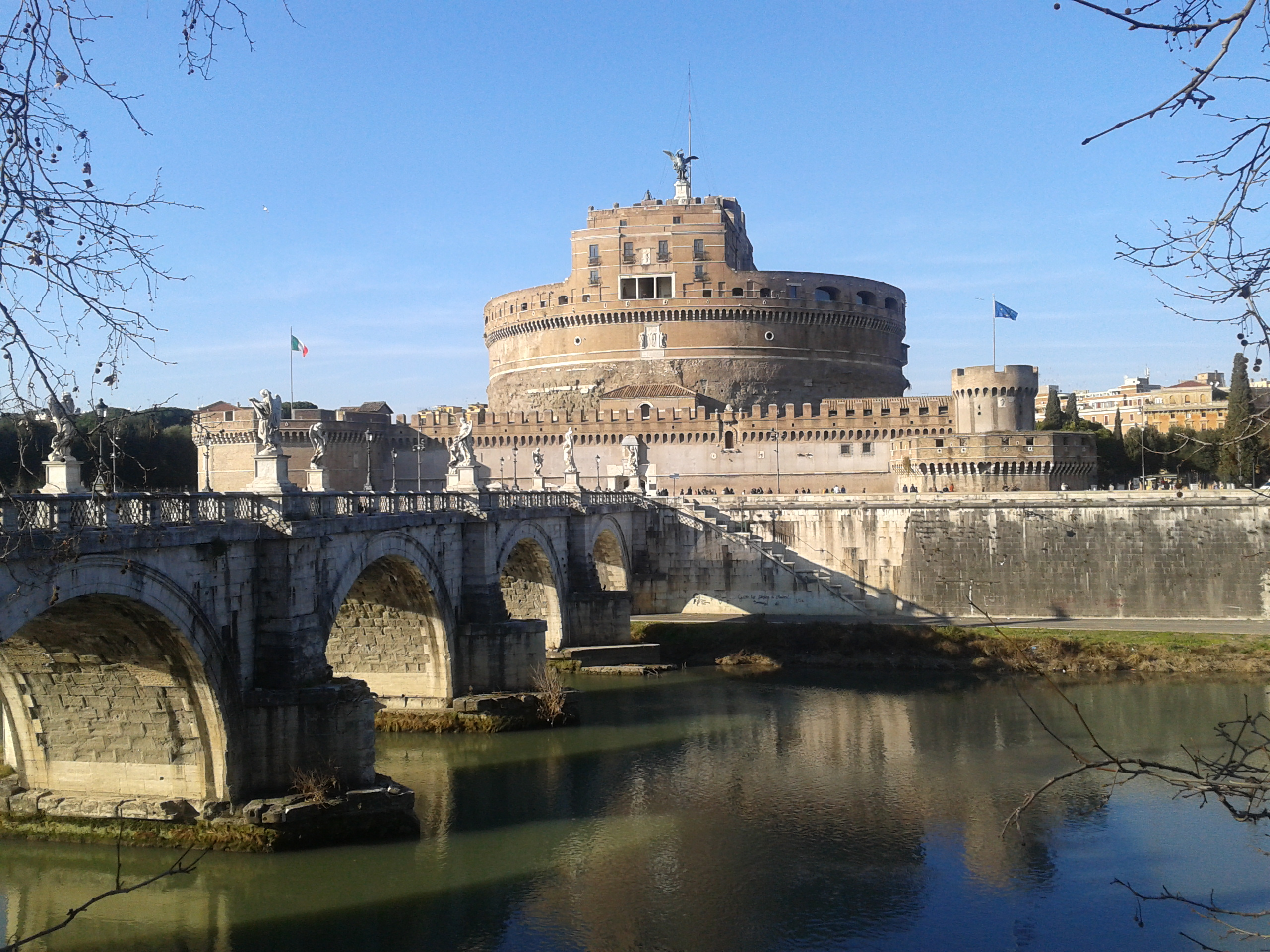
Castel Sant'Angelo, the Mausoleum of Hadrian; the Ponte Sant'Angelo is on the left, also the work of Hadrian.

Hadrian had a grand mausoleum, now better known as the Castel Sant'Angelo, built for himself and his family in the Pons Aelius in 120 AD. In addition to its fame as the resting place of the emperor, the construction of the mausoleum is famous in its own right, as it has a particularly complex vertical design. A rectangular base supports the usual cylindrical frame. Atop the frame is a garden roof with a baroque monument bearing the statue of an angel. The original statue, that of a golden quadriga, among other treasures, fell victim to various attacks when the mausoleum served as a castle and a papal fortress during the Middle Ages. Over a century would pass before a new mausoleum would house the remains of an emperor. The corruption of the Severans and the Third Century Crisis did not offer much opportunity for such a glorious memorialization.

==== The Tetrarchy ====
Diocletian, Maxentius, Galerius, and Constantius I all had their own mausolea. Diocletian and Galerius, who ruled the Eastern Empire, have particularly visible eastern influences in their mausolea, now both churches. Viewers can observe the tower in the former's building, built inside Diocletian's Palace in Split, Croatia and the dark oil murals on the interior of the latter's, in Thessalonica. Diocletian's mausoleum is now the main part of the Split Cathedral. The Mausoleum of Maxentius outside Rome is the only one of the four in Italy. It lies on the Via Appia, where his villa and circus lie in ruins. Colvin asserts that the army likely buried Constantius in Trier, but there is no material evidence.

== See also ==
- Death in ancient Greek art

== Bibliography ==
- Awan, Heather T. (2007). "Roman Sarcophagi". Heilbrunn Timeline of Art History. New York: The Metropolitan Museum of Art.
- Berg, Beverly (1994). "Alcestis and Hercules in the Catacomb of Via Latina". Vigiliae Christianae. 48 (3): 219–234. doi:10.2307/1584095. JSTOR 1584095.
- Bisconti, Fabrizio (1999). "The Decoration of Roman Catacombs". The Christian Catacombs of Rome: History, Decoration, Inscriptions. Translated by Christina Carlo Stella and Lori-Ann Touchette (3rd ed.). Rome: Schnell & Steiner.
- Campbell, Elisabeth (2015). "Latin Funerary Inscriptions". Johns Hopkins Archaeological Museum.
- Coulton, J. J. (2005). "Pedestals as 'altars' in Roman Asia Minor". Anatolian Studies. 55: 127–157. doi:10.1017/S0066154600000697. JSTOR 20065539. S2CID 193331281.
- Colvin, Howard (1991). Architecture and the Afterlife. New Haven: Yale University Press. pp. 16, 21, 29–30, 49–50, 52–53, 59.
- Elsner, Jas; Huskinson, Janet; Davies, Glenys (2010). "Before Sarcophagi". Life, Death and Representation: Some New Work on Roman Sarcophagi. Vol. 29. Berlin: Walter De Gruyter. pp. 21–55.
- Elsner, Jas; Huskinson, Janet; Russell, Ben (2010). "The Roman Sarcophagus 'Industry': A Reconsideration". Life, Death and Representation: Some New Work on Roman Sarcophagi. Vol. 29. Berlin: Walter De Gruyter. pp. 119–149.
- Hope, Valerie M. (2000). "Inscription and Sculpture: the Construction of Identity in the Military Tombstones of Roman Mainz". In Graham Oliver (ed.). The Epigraphy of Death: Studies in the History and Society of Greece and Rome. Liverpool: Liverpool University Press. pp. 155–185. ISBN 9780853239154.
- Hope, Valerie M. (2003). "Trophies and Tombstones: Commemorating the Roman Soldier". World Archaeology. 35 (1): 79–97. doi:10.1080/0043824032000078090. JSTOR 3560213. S2CID 31467438.
- Hope, Valerie M. (2007). Death in Ancient Rome: a Sourcebook. New York: Routledge. pp. 129–130, 133–134, 136–137.
- Hornblower, S.; Spawforth, A.; Eidinow, E. (2012). The Oxford Classical Dictionary (4th ed.). Oxford: Oxford University Press.
- King, Margaret (2000). "Commemoration of Infants on Roman Funerary Inscriptions". In Graham Oliver (ed.). The Epigraphy of Death: Studies in the History and Society of Greece and Rome. Liverpool: Liverpool University Press. pp. 117–154. ISBN 9780853239154.
- Kleiner, D. E. E. (1987a). Roman Imperial Funerary Altars with Portraits. Rome: Giorgio Bretschneider Editore.
- Kleiner, D. E. E. (1987b). "Women and Family Life on Roman Imperial Funerary Altars". Latomus. 46 (3): 545–554. JSTOR 41540684.
- Mazzoleni, Danilo (1999). "Inscriptions in Roman Catacombs". The Christian Catacombs of Rome: History, Decoration, Inscriptions. Translated by Christina Carlo Stella and Lori-Ann Touchette (3rd ed.). Rome: Schnell & Steiner.
- Mouritsen, Henrik (2005). "Freedmen and Decurions: Epitaphs and Social History in Imperial Italy". The Journal of Roman Studies. 95: 38–63. doi:10.3815/000000005784016315. JSTOR 20066816. S2CID 162253187.
- Nicolai, Vincenzo Fiocchi (1999). "The Origin and Development of Roman Catacombs". The Christian Catacombs of Rome: History, Decoration, Inscriptions. Translated by Christina Carlo Stella and Lori-Ann Touchette (3rd ed.). Rome: Schnell & Steiner.
- Oliver, Graham (2000). "An Introduction to the Epigraphy of Death: Funerary Inscriptions as Evidence". In Graham Oliver (ed.). In The Epigraphy of Death: Studies in the History and Society of Greece and Rome. Liverpool: Liverpool University Press. pp. 1–23. ISBN 9780853239154.
- Osborne, J. (1985). "The Roman Catacombs in the Middle Ages". Papers of the British School at Rome. 53: 278–328. doi:10.1017/S0068246200011569. S2CID 163223163.
- Patterson, John R. (2000). "Living and Dying in the City of Rome: Houses and Tombs". In Jon Coulston & Hazel Dodge (ed.). Ancient Rome: The Archaeology of the Eternal City. Oxford: Oxford University School of Archaeology. pp. 265–269, 271, 273, 278.
- Sanchez-Moral, S.; Luque, L.; Cuezva, S.; Soler, V.; Benavente, D.; Laiz, L.; Gonzalez, J. M.; Saiz-Jimenez, C. (2005). "Deterioration of building materials in Roman catacombs: the influence of visitors". Science of the Total Environment. 349 (1–3): 260–276. Bibcode:2005ScTEn.349..260S. doi:10.1016/j.scitotenv.2004.12.080. JSTOR 16198686. PMID 16198686.
- Smith, Christopher (2000). "Early and Archaic Rome". In Jon Coulston & Hazel Dodge (ed.). Ancient Rome: The Archaeology of the Eternal City. Oxford: Oxford University School of Archaeology.
- Strong, Donald Emrys; Toynbee, J. M. C. (1995). Roger Ling (ed.). Roman Art. Yale University Press.
- Toynbee, J. M. C. (1996). Death and Burial in the Roman World. Baltimore, MD: JHU Press.
- Zanker, Paul; Ewald, Bjorn C. (2012). Living with Myths: the Imagery of Roman Sarcophagi. Translated by Julia Slater. Oxford: Oxford University Press.
