= Peter Connolly (classical scholar) =

British scholar (1935–2012)

Peter Connolly FSA
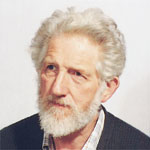
- Born: 8 May 1935
- Died: 2 May 2012 (aged 76)
- Education: Brighton College of Arts and Crafts
- Occupations: Scholar, reconstructional archaeologist and illustrator
- Known for: Work on Greek and Roman military equipment

Peter William Connolly FSA (8 May 1935 – 2 May 2012) was a British illustrator and self-taught scholar of the ancient world, Greek and Roman military equipment historian, and reconstructional archaeologist. He was a regular contributor to such periodicals as the Journal of Roman Military Equipment Studies and Roman Frontier Studies.

== Biography ==
The son of an artist, Connolly studied at the Brighton College of Arts and Crafts after national service in the Royal Air Force. His interest in ancient military history caused him to collaborate with Brian Dobson and H. Russell Robinson; and his first book, The Roman Army, came out in 1975. He wrote and illustrated books about the ancient world, including Pompeii, Greece and Rome at War, The Greek Armies, Colosseum: Rome's Arena of Death, and the award-winning Legend of Odysseus.

Connolly appeared regularly on television as an expert on ancient armies and their equipment, and in the 1980s presented a series for UK schools called "An Archaeological Background to the Gospels" in which he travelled to ancient sites in Israel, illustrating the programmes with his own paintings, many of which appeared in his book Living in the Time of Jesus of Nazareth.

He became a member of the Society of Antiquaries in 1984 and a year later was awarded an honorary research fellowship at the Institute of Archaeology of the University College London. From 1987 until his death in 2012, he lived in Spalding, Lincolnshire.

== Works ==
Works are both written and illustrated by Connolly unless otherwise noted.

- Crosher, Judith (1974), The Greeks, Macdonald Educational (Illustrated by Peter Connolly).
- Connolly, Peter (1975), The Roman Army, Macdonald Educational.
- Connolly, Peter (1977), The Greek Armies, Macdonald Educational.
- Connolly, Peter (1978), Hannibal and the Enemies of Rome, Macdonald Educational.
- Connolly, Peter (1978), Armies of the Crusades, Macdonald Educational.
- Connolly, Peter (1979), Pompeii, Macdonald Educational.
- Connolly, Peter (1981), Greece and Rome at War, Macdonald Phoebus Ltd.
  - Revised edition (1998), London: Greenhill Books and Pennsylvania: Stackpole Books.
- Connolly, Peter (1983), Living in the Time of Jesus of Nazareth, Oxford University Press
  - Reprinted as A History of the Jewish People in the Time of Jesus: From Herod the Great to Masada (1987)
  - Reprinted as The Jews in the Time of Jesus: A History (1995)
  - Reprinted as The Holy Land (1999)
- Connolly, Peter (1986), The Legend of Odysseus, Oxford University Press.
  - Reprinted as The Ancient Greece of Odysseus (1998)
- Connolly, Peter (1988), Tiberius Claudius Maximus: The Legionary, Oxford University Press.
- Connolly, Peter (1988), Tiberius Claudius Maximus: The Cavalryman, Oxford University Press.
- Hackett, John (1989), Warfare in the Ancient World, Facts On File (Illustrated by Peter Connolly).
- Coe, Michael (editor) (1989), Swords and Hilt Weapons, Grove Press (Contributor: Peter Connolly).
- Connolly, Peter (1991), The Roman Fort, Oxford University Press.
- Burrell, Roy (1991), The Romans, Oxford University Press (Illustrated by Peter Connolly).
- Connolly, Peter (1993), Greek Legends: The Stories, the Evidence, Simon & Schuster.
- Burrell, Roy (1997), Oxford First Ancient History (Series: Oxford First Books), Oxford University Press (Illustrated by Peter Connolly).
- Connolly, Peter (editor) (1998), The Hutchinson Dictionary of Ancient and Medieval Warfare, Routledge.
- Connolly, Peter and Hazel Dodge (1998), The Ancient City, Life in Classical Athens & Rome, Oxford University Press.
- Connolly, Peter (2001), Ancient Greece, Oxford University Press (Text by Andrew Solway).
- Connolly, Peter (2001), Ancient Rome, Oxford University Press (Text by Andrew Solway).
- Connolly, Peter (2003), Colosseum: Rome's Arena of Death, BBC Books.
