= Jon Coulston =

British archaeologist (1957–2024)

Jonathan Charles Nelson Coulston FSA (5 July 1957 – 6 July 2024) was a British archaeologist and lecturer who specialised in Roman army studies and Roman art and architecture. He was Senior Lecturer in the School of Classics at the University of St Andrews.

== Biography ==
Coulston undertook undergraduate studies at Leicester University, and his postgraduate and PhD studies at the University of Newcastle. His 1988 PhD thesis was titled "Trajan's column: the sculpting and relief content of a Roman propaganda monument". Jon married Hazel Dodge.

Coulston published widely in the fields of Roman army studies, especially relating to Roman cavalry equipment, and on Roman art and architecture. He was a leading scholar on the iconography of Trajan's Column and its use in studying the Roman army. He was awarded a University Teaching Award from St. Andrews in 2016.

Coulston was elected as a Fellow of the Society of Antiquaries of Scotland in 1991. He was elected as a Fellow of the Society of Antiquaries of London on 10 October 2002.

Coulston died from cancer on 6 July 2024, one day after his 67th birthday.

== Select bibliography ==
- Coulston, J.C.N. 1988. Corpus Signorum Imperii Romani Hadrian’s Wall West of the North Tyne, and Carlisle
- Coulston, J.C.N. and Dodge, H. (eds) 2000. Ancient Rome: the Archaeology of the Eternal City (Oxford University School of Archaeology Monograph 54).
- Bishop, M.C. and Coulston, J.C.N. 2006 (2nd edition). Roman military equipment: from the Punic wars to the fall of Rome.
- Coulston, J.C.N. 2014. "Monumentalising military service: soldiers in Romano-British sculpture", in Collins, R. & McIntosh, F. (eds). Life in the Limes. Studies of the People and Objects of the Roman Frontiers. Oxbow. 68–78.
- Coulston, J.C.N. 2018. "The Army in Imperial Rome", in Holleran, C. & Claridge, A. (eds).A Companion to the City of Rome. Wiley-Blackwell. 173–195.
- Coulston, J.C.N. 2020. "The cavalry on Trajan's Column: a study in composition, content and sculptural intent", in Proceedings of the Nineteenth Roman Military Equipment Conference (RoMEC XVIIII). The Armatura Press. 257–292.
