= Hazel Dodge =

Historian

Hazel Dodge is senior Lecturer of Roman Archaeology at Trinity College, Dublin. She holds her degrees from the University of Newcastle-Upon-Tyne and her research interests include the Eastern Roman Empire, the Roman construction industry and the city of Rome. Her PhD concerns the use and distribution of marble from the Eastern Empire. She has published extensively on Roman archaeology often in collaboration with colleagues such as Peter Connolly and Jon Coulston to whom she is married. One of her most notable publications is "the Archaeology of the City of Rome" and most recently she has published a volume on spectacle in the Roman World for Bristol Classical Press. A new source book on Rome with Jon Coulston and Christopher Smith is forthcoming. In 2010/11 she was a guest lecturer with the Archaeological Institute of America.

== Honours ==
In 2014 she was elected as a Corresponding Member of the Archaeological Institute of America.

== Bibliography ==
- ‘Amphitheatres in the Roman East’, in T. Wilmott (ed), Roman Amphitheatres and spectacula: a 21st-century perspective. Papers from the Chester conference, February 2007, Chester, UK, 2009, in press
- ‘Circuses in the Roman East: A Reappraisal’, in J Clement-Nelis and J-M Roddaz (eds), Actes du Colloque Le cirque romain et son image, Bordeaux, 2006, Ausonius Publications, 2008, 133 - 146
- Dictionary entries: amphitheatres, Carrara, circuses. buildings, concrete, Dokimeion, forum, Jerash, marble, masonry styles, quarries, stone, Theatres. Roman, in G. Shipley, J. Vanderspoel, D. Mattingly, L. Foxhall (eds), The Cambridge Dictionary of Classical Civilisation, Cambridge, CUP, 2006
- with J. C. Coulston, ‘The metropolis’, in G. Woolf (ed), Cambridge Illustrated History of the Roman World, Cambridge 2003, 138-169
- "Circus and Chariot racing" entry for Oxford Encyclopaedia for Theatre and Performance, publication 2002
- editor (with J. C. N. Coulston), Ancient Rome: the Archaeology of the Eternal City, Oxford University School of Archaeology Monograph 54, Oxford 2000
- ‘ ‘Greater than the Pyramids’: the water supply of Ancient Rome’, Ancient Rome: The Archaeology of the Eternal City, J.C.N. Coulston and H. Dodge (eds), Oxford University School of Archaeology Monograph 54, Oxford 2000, 166-209
- 'The Building Materials from the East Baths', in L. Stirling, D. Stone and N. Ben Lazreg (eds), Leptiminus (Lamta) Report 2, JRA Suppl 41, Portsmouth RI 2001, 104-107
- 'Building Materials from the Cemeteries, the kilns and the Museum Site', in L. Stirling, D. Stone and N. Ben Lazreg (eds), Leptiminus (Lamta) Report 2, JRA Suppl 41, Portsmouth RI 2001, 210-214
- ‘Entertaining the Masses: the Structures', in D. Potter and D. Mattingly (eds), Life, death and Entertainment in the Roman World, Michigan University Press Ann Arbor 1999, 205-255
- with Peter Connolly, The Ancient City, Oxford University Press 1998
- with B. Ward-Perkins, Marble in Antiquity Collected Papers and lectures of J. B. Ward-Perkins, British School at Rome Mon. 6, London, British School at Rome, 1992
